= Lists of films by genre =

A film genre is a stylistic or thematic category for motion pictures based on similarities either in the narrative elements, aesthetic approach, or the emotional response to the film. One can also classify films by the tone, theme/topic, mood, format, target audience, or budget. These characteristics are most evident in genre films, which are "commercial feature films [that], through repetition and variation, tell familiar stories with familiar characters and familiar situations" in a given genre.

A film's genre will influence the use of filmmaking styles and techniques, such as the use of flashbacks and low-key lighting in film noir; tight framing in horror films; or fonts that look like rough-hewn logs for the titles of Western films. In addition, genres have associated film scoring conventions, such as lush string orchestras for romantic melodramas or electronic music for science fiction films. Genre also affects how films are broadcast on television, advertised, and organized in video rental stores.

== General ==
=== General ===
- List of American children's films
- Lists of animated films
- List of apocalyptic films
- List of biker films
- List of blaxploitation films
- List of children's films
- List of children's animated films
- List of Christian films
- List of disaster films
- List of docufiction films
- List of dystopian films
- List of erotic films
- List of erotic thriller films
- List of feature films described as non-narrative
- List of film noir titles
- List of giallo films
- Lists of historical films
  - List of historical films set in Asia
  - List of historical films set in Near Eastern and Western civilization
- List of hood films
- List of Independent Lens films
- List of independent short films
- List of Japanese sexploitation films
- List of live-action films based on cartoons and comics
- List of live-action puppet films
- List of melodrama films
- List of musical films by year
- List of mystery films
- List of neo-noir films
- List of nonlinear narrative films
- List of prison films
- List of punk films
- List of religious films
- List of romance films
- List of satirical films
- List of sex hygiene films
- List of skinhead films
- List of sports films
- List of stop motion films
- List of teen films
- List of terrorism films

== Action ==
- List of action films of the 1960s
- List of action films of the 1970s
- List of action films of the 1980s
- List of action films of the 1990s
- List of action films of the 2000s
- List of action films of the 2010s
- List of action films of the 2020s
- List of martial arts films
- List of mixed martial arts films
- List of ninja films

== Adventure ==
- List of adventure films before 1920
- List of adventure films of the 1920s
- List of adventure films of the 1930s
- List of adventure films of the 1940s
- List of adventure films of the 1950s
- List of adventure films of the 1960s
- List of adventure films of the 1970s
- List of adventure films of the 1980s
- List of adventure films of the 1990s
- List of adventure films of the 2000s
- List of adventure films of the 2010s
- List of adventure films of the 2020s
- List of pirate films and television series

== Avant-garde ==
- List of avant-garde films before 1930
- List of avant-garde films of the 1930s
- List of avant-garde films of the 1940s
- List of avant-garde films of the 1950s
- List of avant-garde films of the 1960s
- List of avant-garde films of the 1970s
- List of avant-garde films of the 1980s
- List of avant-garde films of the 1990s
- List of avant-garde films of the 2000s
- List of avant-garde films of the 2010s
- List of avant-garde films of the 2020s

== Biographical ==
- List of biographical films pre-1960s
- List of biographical films of the 1960s
- List of biographical films of the 1970s
- List of biographical films of the 1980s
- List of biographical films of the 1990s
- List of biographical films of the 2000s
- List of biographical films of the 2010s
- List of biographical films of the 2020s
- List of highest-grossing biographical films

== Comedy ==
=== By decade ===
- List of comedy films before 1920
- List of comedy films of the 1920s
- List of comedy films of the 1930s
- List of comedy films of the 1940s
- List of comedy films of the 1950s
- List of comedy films of the 1960s
- List of comedy films of the 1970s
- List of comedy films of the 1980s
- List of comedy films of the 1990s
- List of comedy films of the 2000s
- List of comedy films of the 2010s
- List of comedy films of the 2020s

=== By nationality or subject ===
- List of American comedy films
- List of Brazilian comedy films
- List of British comedy films
- List of Indian comedy films
- List of comedy horror films
- List of comedy–mystery films
- List of romantic comedy films
- List of science fiction comedy films

== Crime ==
- List of crime films before 1930
- List of crime films of the 1930s
- List of crime films of the 1940s
- List of crime films of the 1950s
- List of crime films of the 1960s
- List of crime films of the 1970s
- List of crime films of the 1980s
- List of crime films of the 1990s
- 1990
- 1991
- 1992
- 1993
- 1994
- 1995
- 1996
- 1997
- 1998
- 1999
- List of crime films of the 2000s
- 2000
- 2001
- 2002
- 2003
- 2004
- 2005
- 2006
- 2007
- 2008
- 2009
- List of crime films of the 2010s
- List of crime films of the 2020s

== Documentary ==
- List of documentary films
- List of documentary films about agriculture
- List of documentary films about China
- List of documentary films about the Korean War
- List of documentary films about video games
- List of documentary films about World War II

== Drama ==
- List of drama films of the 1900s
- List of drama films of the 1910s
- List of drama films of the 1920s
- List of drama films of the 1930s
- List of drama films of the 1940s
- List of drama films of the 1950s
- List of drama films of the 1960s
- List of drama films of the 1970s
- List of drama films of the 1980s
- List of drama films of the 1990s
- List of drama films of the 2000s
- List of drama films of the 2010s
- List of drama films of the 2020s

== Fantasy ==
- List of fantasy films before 1930
- List of fantasy films of the 1930s
- List of fantasy films of the 1940s
- List of fantasy films of the 1950s
- List of fantasy films of the 1960s
- List of fantasy films of the 1970s
- List of fantasy films of the 1980s
- List of fantasy films of the 1990s
- List of fantasy films of the 2000s
- List of fantasy films of the 2010s
- List of fantasy films of the 2020s
- List of highest-grossing fantasy films
- List of sword-and-sorcery films

== Horror ==
=== Before 1960 ===
- List of horror films of the 1890s
- List of horror films of the 1900s
- List of horror films of the 1910s
- List of horror films of the 1920s
- List of horror films of the 1930s
- List of horror films of the 1940s
- List of horror films of the 1950s

=== 1960–present ===
- 1960
- 1961
- 1962
- 1963
- 1964
- 1965
- 1966
- 1967
- 1968
- 1969
- 1970
- 1971
- 1972
- 1973
- 1974
- 1975
- 1976
- 1977
- 1978
- 1979
- 1980
- 1981
- 1982
- 1983
- 1984
- 1985
- 1986
- 1987
- 1988
- 1989
- 1990
- 1991
- 1992
- 1993
- 1994
- 1995
- 1996
- 1997
- 1998
- 1999
- 2000
- 2001
- 2002
- 2003
- 2004
- 2005
- 2006
- 2007
- 2008
- 2009
- 2010
- 2011
- 2012
- 2013
- 2014
- 2015
- 2016
- 2017
- 2018
- 2019
- 2020
- 2021
- 2022
- 2023
- 2024
- 2025
- 2026

=== Other ===
- List of horror films set in academic institutions
- List of holiday horror films
- List of analog horror media
- List of eco-horror films
- List of comedy horror films
- List of science fiction horror films
- List of natural horror films
- List of ghost films
- List of mummy films
- List of vampire films
- List of zombie films
- List of monster movies
- List of films featuring giant monsters
- List of highest-grossing horror films
- List of World War II horror films
- List of horror anthology films

== LGBTQ ==
=== Before 1960 ===
- List of LGBTQ-related films pre-1920
- List of LGBTQ-related films of the 1920s
- List of LGBTQ-related films of the 1930s
- List of LGBTQ-related films of the 1940s
- List of LGBTQ-related films of the 1950s
- List of LGBTQ-related films of the 1960s

=== 1960–present ===
- 1960
- 1961
- 1962
- 1963
- 1964
- 1965
- 1966
- 1967
- 1968
- 1969
- 1970
- 1971
- 1972
- 1973
- 1974
- 1975
- 1976
- 1977
- 1978
- 1979
- 1980
- 1981
- 1982
- 1983
- 1984
- 1985
- 1986
- 1987
- 1988
- 1989
- 1990
- 1991
- 1992
- 1993
- 1994
- 1995
- 1996
- 1997
- 1998
- 1999
- 2000
- 2001
- 2002
- 2003
- 2004
- 2005
- 2006
- 2007
- 2008
- 2009
- 2010
- 2011
- 2012
- 2013
- 2014
- 2015
- 2016
- 2017
- 2018
- 2019
- 2020
- 2021
- 2022
- 2023
- 2024
- 2025
- 2026

=== Other ===
- List of LGBTQ-related films by storyline
- List of made-for-television films with LGBTQ characters
- List of LGBTQ-related films directed by women
- List of animated films with LGBTQ characters
- List of LGBTQ-related films
- List of LGBTQ-related films by year

== Science fiction ==
- List of science fiction films before 1920
- List of science fiction films of the 1920s
- List of science fiction films of the 1930s
- List of science fiction films of the 1940s
- List of science fiction films of the 1950s
- List of science fiction films of the 1960s
- List of science fiction films of the 1970s
- List of science fiction films of the 1980s
- List of science fiction films of the 1990s
- List of science fiction films of the 2000s
- List of science fiction films of the 2010s
- List of science fiction films of the 2020s
- List of science fiction action films
- List of science fiction comedy films
- List of science fiction horror films
- List of science fiction thriller films
- List of science fiction television films

== Superhero ==
- List of American superhero films
- List of Indian superhero films
- List of highest-grossing superhero films
- List of superhero productions created by Toei

== Thriller ==
- List of thriller films before 1940
- List of thriller films of the 1940s
- List of thriller films of the 1950s
- List of thriller films of the 1960s
- List of thriller films of the 1970s
- List of thriller films of the 1980s
- List of thriller films of the 1990s
- List of thriller films of the 2000s
- List of thriller films of the 2010s
- List of thriller films of the 2020s
- List of science fiction thriller films
- List of conspiracy-thriller films and television series

== War ==
- List of war films and TV specials
- List of war films and TV specials set between 3050 BC and AD 476
- List of war films and TV specials set between 476 and 1453
- List of war films and TV specials set between 1453 and 1775
- List of war films and TV specials set between 1775 and 1914
- List of war films and TV specials set between 1914 and 1945
- List of war films and TV specials set between 1945 and 2001
- List of war films and TV specials set between 2001 and the present
- List of Vietnam War films

== Western ==
- List of Western films before 1920
- List of Western films of the 1920s
- List of Western films of the 1930s
- List of Western films of the 1940s
- List of Western films 1950–1954
- List of Western films 1955–1959
- List of Western films of the 1960s
- List of Western films of the 1970s
- List of Western films of the 1980s
- List of Western films of the 1990s
- List of Western films of the 2000s
- List of Western films of the 2010s
- List of Western films of the 2020s
- List of spaghetti Western films
- List of Euro-Western films

== See also ==
- List of body horror media
- List of mockumentaries
- List of time travel works of fiction
- Anti-war film
- Body swap appearances in media
- Parody film
- Spy film
- Survival film
- Swashbuckler film
