= List of LGBTQ-related films by year =

This is a list of lesbian, gay, bisexual, transgender or queer-related films. It contains theatrically released films that deal with important gay, lesbian, bisexual, transgender or queer characters or issues and may have same-sex romance or relationships as a plot device.

Made-for-television films are listed separately. There is also a list of these films alphabetically.

== 1895–1950s ==
- List of LGBTQ-related films pre-1920
- List of LGBTQ-related films of the 1920s
- List of LGBTQ-related films of the 1930s
- List of LGBTQ-related films of the 1940s
- List of LGBTQ-related films of the 1950s

== 1960s ==
- List of LGBTQ-related films of 1960
- List of LGBTQ-related films of 1961
- List of LGBTQ-related films of 1962
- List of LGBTQ-related films of 1963
- List of LGBTQ-related films of 1964
- List of LGBTQ-related films of 1965
- List of LGBTQ-related films of 1966
- List of LGBTQ-related films of 1967
- List of LGBTQ-related films of 1968
- List of LGBTQ-related films of 1969

== 1970s ==
- List of LGBTQ-related films of 1970
- List of LGBTQ-related films of 1971
- List of LGBTQ-related films of 1972
- List of LGBTQ-related films of 1973
- List of LGBTQ-related films of 1974
- List of LGBTQ-related films of 1975
- List of LGBTQ-related films of 1976
- List of LGBTQ-related films of 1977
- List of LGBTQ-related films of 1978
- List of LGBTQ-related films of 1979

== 1980s ==
- List of LGBTQ-related films of 1980
- List of LGBTQ-related films of 1981
- List of LGBTQ-related films of 1982
- List of LGBTQ-related films of 1983
- List of LGBTQ-related films of 1984
- List of LGBTQ-related films of 1985
- List of LGBTQ-related films of 1986
- List of LGBTQ-related films of 1987
- List of LGBTQ-related films of 1988
- List of LGBTQ-related films of 1989

== 1990s ==
- List of LGBTQ-related films of 1990
- List of LGBTQ-related films of 1991
- List of LGBTQ-related films of 1992
- List of LGBTQ-related films of 1993
- List of LGBTQ-related films of 1994
- List of LGBTQ-related films of 1995
- List of LGBTQ-related films of 1996
- List of LGBTQ-related films of 1997
- List of LGBTQ-related films of 1998
- List of LGBTQ-related films of 1999

== 2000s ==
- List of LGBTQ-related films of 2000
- List of LGBTQ-related films of 2001
- List of LGBTQ-related films of 2002
- List of LGBTQ-related films of 2003
- List of LGBTQ-related films of 2004
- List of LGBTQ-related films of 2005
- List of LGBTQ-related films of 2006
- List of LGBTQ-related films of 2007
- List of LGBTQ-related films of 2008
- List of LGBTQ-related films of 2009

== 2010s ==
- List of LGBTQ-related films of 2010
- List of LGBTQ-related films of 2011
- List of LGBTQ-related films of 2012
- List of LGBTQ-related films of 2013
- List of LGBTQ-related films of 2014
- List of LGBTQ-related films of 2015
- List of LGBTQ-related films of 2016
- List of LGBTQ-related films of 2017
- List of LGBTQ-related films of 2018
- List of LGBTQ-related films of 2019

== 2020s ==
- List of LGBTQ-related films of 2020
- List of LGBTQ-related films of 2021
- List of LGBTQ-related films of 2022
- List of LGBTQ-related films of 2023
- List of LGBTQ-related films of 2024
- List of LGBTQ-related films of 2025
- List of LGBTQ-related films of 2026

== See also ==
- Alphabetical list of LGBTQ-related films
- List of LGBTQ-related films by storyline
- The Celluloid Closet (book)
  - The Celluloid Closet (film)
- Lists of American television episodes with LGBTQ themes
- Lists of television programs with LGBTQ characters
- Sexuality and gender identity-based cultures
- LGBT themes in horror fiction
- List of transgender characters in film and television

=== Sources ===
- Darren, Alison (2000). Lesbian Film Guide. Continuum International Publishing Group. ISBN 0-304-33376-X.
- Russo, Vito (1987). The Celluloid Closet: Homosexuality in the Movies. New York: Harper & Row. ISBN 0-06-096132-5.
