= List of LGBTQ-related films of the 1980s =

LGBTQ-related films released in the 1980s are listed in the following articles:

- List of LGBTQ-related films of 1980
- List of LGBTQ-related films of 1981
- List of LGBTQ-related films of 1982
- List of LGBTQ-related films of 1983
- List of LGBTQ-related films of 1984
- List of LGBTQ-related films of 1985
- List of LGBTQ-related films of 1986
- List of LGBTQ-related films of 1987
- List of LGBTQ-related films of 1988
- List of LGBTQ-related films of 1989
