= List of LGBTQ-related films of the 1960s =

LGBTQ-related films released in the 1960s are listed in the following articles:

- List of LGBTQ-related films of 1960
- List of LGBTQ-related films of 1961
- List of LGBTQ-related films of 1962
- List of LGBTQ-related films of 1963
- List of LGBTQ-related films of 1964
- List of LGBTQ-related films of 1965
- List of LGBTQ-related films of 1966
- List of LGBTQ-related films of 1967
- List of LGBTQ-related films of 1968
- List of LGBTQ-related films of 1969
