= Gates to Paradise =

1968 British film by Andrzej Wajda

- French film poster
- Directed by: Andrzej Wajda
- Written by: Jerzy Andrzejewski; Donald Howarth
- Produced by: Sam Waynberg
- Starring: John Fordyce; Lionel Stander; Mathieu Carrière; Pauline Challoner; Ferdy Mayne
- Cinematography: Mieczyslaw Jahoda
- Music by: Ward Swingle
- Production company: Avala Film
- Release date: 23 June 1968; (West Berlin)
- Running time: 89 minutes
- Countries: United Kingdom; Yugoslavia

Gates to Paradise (also known as Vrata Raja) is a 1968 film by Polish director Andrzej Wajda and starring Lionel Stander, Ferdy Mayne and Mathieu Carrière. The film is set in medieval France and is based on the 1960 novel by Polish writer Jerzy Andrzejewski that seeks to expose the motives behind youthful religious zeal. It was entered into the 18th Berlin International Film Festival.

== Plot ==
In 1212, a Children's Crusade is launched after Jakob claims to have had a vision in which it is said that the innocence of children would be able to liberate Jerusalem. A monk, returning from Jerusalem, joins the crusade and hears the children's confessions, gradually realizing that most of them are taking part not for religious, but for more worldly reasons, like rejected love.

Both Alexander and Bianca are in love with Jakob. Alexander, who has learned that his adoptive father (and his lover), Count Ludwig, also a crusader, had killed Alexander's Greek parents, is gleeful that Jakob is in love with the count, whom he had met after the count and Alexander had split after an argument. This allows Alexander to take revenge for the count's infidelity by telling his beloved Jakob about the count's recent demise by drowning in a river, watched by an unmoved Alexander.

Finally, it is revealed in Jakob's confession that Jakob received the inspiration for the crusade not from God but from the Count, which means that the crusade must fail because it is not by the will of God. However, the monk is unable to stop the children's progression and is left behind.

== Cast ==
- Lionel Stander as Monk
- Ferdy Mayne as Count Ludovic de Vendôme
- Mathieu Carrière as Alexis Melissen
- Pauline Challoner as Blanche
- John Fordyce as Jacques de Cloyes
- Jenny Agutter as Maud de Cloyes
- Dragomir Felba as Crusader 1
- Denis Gilmore as Robert (as Dennis Gilmore)
- Gojko Kovačević as Crusader 2
- Ljabomir Radavic as Crusader 3
- Kynaston Reeves as Superior
- Janez Vrhovec as François

== Release ==
The film premiered on 23 June 1968 at the 18th Berlin International Film Festival. According to contemporaneous reports, the film was met with "loud boos and whistles", due to the festival audience objecting to the "strong homosexual theme of the film."

== Reception ==
Boleslaw Sulik of the British Film Institute wrote that the film was "without question, Wajda's saddest international failure; he shot it on Yugoslav locations in English, on a slender budget and a ridiculously tight schedule, with Lionel Stander woefully miscast as a medieval monk." American film critic Andrew Sarris said the film was an "incredibly stilted attempt to link one of the children's crusades of 13th century Europe to an embarrassingly idyllic homosexual conspiracy."

Film critic Robert Taylor had harsh words for the film as well, observing it is "poorly written and directed." He went on to say the movie "deserved all the laughter, hoots and hisses it received from its film festival audience." In his review for the San Diego Reader, Jay Sanford opined that "what makes the storytelling so intriguing is how each of the main characters tells their own tale in the form of frequently alarming confessions to the one adult accompanying the children."

Albert Johnson of the San Francisco Film Society said "Wajda has gleaned splendid performances from his young actors, and Lionel Stander plays the monk with gruff-voiced compassion and total seriousness; the director has created a vivid series of images for his tragic tale of innocence overthrown, in which truth is the real murderer of idealized hopes." Ted Mahar of The Oregonian said the film was a "literally laughable story of how a religious crusade was indirectly inspired by a homosexual triangle and some blundered adolescent sex; the whole film was more blundered than any adolescent sex."

== See also ==
- List of historical drama films
- List of LGBTQ-related films of 1968
