= Boulevard (1960 film) =

1960 French drama film

- Directed by: Julien Duvivier
- Written by: René Barjavel (adaptation); Julien Duvivier (adaptation); René Barjavel (dialogue)
- Produced by: Lucien Viard
- Starring: Jean-Pierre Léaud; Monique Brienne; Pierre Mondy; Magali Noël
- Cinematography: Roger Dormoy
- Edited by: Paul Cayatte
- Music by: Jean Yatove
- Color process: Black and white
- Production company: Orex Films
- Distributed by: Pathé Consortium Cinéma
- Release date: 30 November 1960
- Running time: 95 minutes
- Country: France
- Language: French

Boulevard is a 1960 French comedy-drama film directed by Julien Duvivier and starring Jean-Pierre Léaud, Monique Brienne, Pierre Mondy and Magali Noël.

== Plot ==
Georges "Jojo" Castagnier is an adolescent who lives in a poor room under the roof of a block of apartments in the Pigalle section of Paris. He ran away from home when he realized that his stepmother hates him.

Among Jojo's many neighbors is the object of his affection, gorgeous nightclub dancer Jenny Dorr. But, to Jojo's disappointment, Jenny becomes the lover of former boxer Dicky, who spends his time loafing about the Pigalle cafés. Another one of his neighbors is a gay artist who fusses after him.

Jojo lacks for steady work, but manages to meet his financial obligations with a series of odd jobs. He tries selling magazines, which is a success for a while, and he also tries posing shirtless for a couple of gay artists, which does not work out.

Eventually, he woos his neighbor Marietta, a girl more suited to his age. But when he sees her kissing another man, things go awry, and Jojo becomes desperate, smashing the neon lights on top of his building while yelling bastards, and then for a brief moment, contemplates jumping off the roof of his building.

In the end, his neighbors come to his rescue and convince him not to jump, and his father shows up and he reconciles with him, by telling Jojo that he has left the stepmother, which causes Jojo to start laughing hysterically in delight.

== Cast ==
- Jean-Pierre Léaud as Georges 'Jojo' Castagnier
- Monique Brienne as Marietta
- Pierre Mondy as Dicky
- Magali Noël as Jenny Dorr
- Jacques Duby as Giuseppe Amato, un peintre
- Georges Adet as Monsieur Arthur
- Jean-Marie Amato as Le clochard
- Mag-Avril as La vieille Joséphine
- Alain Beach as Himself
- Detty Beckers as Une danseuse
- Anne Beguet as Marie Castagnier
- Jacques Bézard as Himself
- Carla Clark as Himself
- Anny Collin as Himself (as Any Collin)
- Robert Dalban as Le forain
- Christine Darnay as Himself
- Noël Darzal as Himself
- Raoul Delfosse as Le serveur de la buvette
- Gérard Fallec as Roger
- Pierre Frag as Julius Rosenthal
- Jacques Herlin as Le garçon de café
- Bob Ingarao as Louis Arnavon, un boxeur
- Jean-Louis Le Goff as Le policier en civil
- Marcellys as Le clown
- Maryse Martin as Mme Duriez
- Albert Michel as Gaston Duriez
- Alain Morat as Pietro Bennazzi (as Bibi Morat)
- Nina Myral as Himself
- Hubert Noël as Le maquereau
- Alexandre Rignault as L'entraîneur de boxe
- Aram Stephan as Himself
- Hélène Tossy as Mme Benazzi
- Paul Uny as Himself
- Julien Verdier as Jean Castagnier
- Louis Viret as Himself

== Background and production ==
Jean-Pierre Léaud was only 15 years old when the movie was shot, and it was his second lead role. Filming took place at Boulogne Studios; various locations in Paris, and director Duvivier reportedly had to keep close tabs on Leaud to keep him out of trouble. Leaud had caused a commotion when he tried to get into a strip-tease show, and the management refused him entrance, due to him being underage. He also had his first screen kiss in the movie with Monique Brienne.

== Reception ==
Author John Grant wrote the film is "borderline noir ... a traditional style movie made when the Nouvelle Vague was hitting its heights ... this must have seemed, and still seems, a mere anachronism to cinéastes and a blessed relief to moviegoers, because it has a good tale to tell and tells it well."

Biographer Ben McCann opined that when "Jojo learns that his father has shown his stepmother the door, he laughs uncontrollably." McCann states "it is another example of the Duvivier paroxysm, but inverted; there is no cathartic violence; rather an ecstatic reaction, shot in close-up, to the banishment of the abject mother; Jojo laughs again when his father tells him that he gave the stepmother a couple of good slaps; it is an uneasy end to the film, whereby violence to the female is framed as an uplifting gesture of male reconciliation."

Le Devoir said Jean-Pierre Léaud "plays comedy well, but without any real passion; he has a rather unpleasant, gruff side. As for the rest, let's not even go there, since the rest is practically nonexistent, except for Jacques Duby who manages to stand out despite an unlikable role. Some genre scenes, like the continuing dispute within the Italian family, posing sessions, would be quite enjoyable if they weren't so overused. Paris is photographed by Roger Dormy better than by anyone else. In conclusion: the film isn't worth much, no matter which way you look at it."

== See also ==
- List of French-language films
- List of LGBTQ-related films of 1960
