= List of war films and TV specials set between 476 and 1453 =

The war films and TV specials included here are set in the Middle Ages, starting with the time period after the fall of the Western Roman Empire in 476, and lasting until the fall of the Byzantine Empire in 1453.

== Anglo-Saxon settlement of Britain (477-490) ==
- King Arthur (2004)

== Gothic Wars (527–565) ==
- Theodora (1921)
- Theodora, Slave Empress (1954)
- The Last Roman (1968/69) is the last film to be directed by Robert Siodmak.

== Lombard invasion of Italy (567-572) ==
- Goliath and the Barbarians (1959)
- Sword of the Conqueror (1961)

== Wars of the Francia (481–840) ==
- Orlando e i Paladini di Francia (1956)
- I paladini – Storia d'armi e d'amori (1983)
- Charlemagne, le prince à cheval (1993)
- Redbad (2018)

== Wars of China in the middle ages (618-1500) ==
=== Wars of Tang dynasty (618–907) ===
- The Empress Wu Tse-tien (1939)
- Princess Yang Kwei-Fei (1955)
- The Magnificent Concubine (1962)
- Empress Wu Tse-Tien (1963)
- The Heroic Ones (1970)
- Once Upon a Time in a Battlefield (2003)，Goguryeo–Tang War
- Warriors of Heaven and Earth (2003)
- House of Flying Daggers (2004)
- Detective Dee and the Mystery of the Phantom Flame (2010)
- Battlefield Heroes (2011)，Goguryeo–Tang War
- Young Detective Dee: Rise of the Sea Dragon (2013)
- The Assassin (2015)
- Lady of the Dynasty (2015)
- The Great Battle (2018)
- The Longest Day in Chang'an (2019)

=== Wars of Five Dynasties and Ten Kingdoms Period (907–960) ===
- Curse of the Golden Flower (2006)
- The Banquet (2006)

=== Wars of Song dynasty (960–1279) ===
- The Twelve Gold Medallions (1970)
- The 14 Amazons (1972)
- All Men Are Brothers (1975)
- The Silk Road (1988)
- Legendary Amazons (2011)
- Saving General Yang (2013)

== Early Muslim conquests (622–751) ==
- Mohammad, Messenger of God (1976)
- Al Qadisiyya (1981)
- Hussein Who Said No (2014)
- Muhammad: The Messenger of God (2015)

== Spanish Reconquest (718–1492) ==
- El Cid (1961)
- The Castilian (1963)
- I cento cavalieri (1964)
- El Cid (TV series) (2020)

== War during the Viking Age (789–1130) ==
- The Viking (1928)
- The Vikings (1958)
- Erik the Conqueror (1961)
- The Last of the Vikings (1961)
- Attack of the Normans (1962)
- Här kommer bärsärkarna (1965)
- Alfred the Great (1969)
- The Norseman (1978)
- Outlaw: The Saga of Gisli (1981)
- When the Raven Flies (1984)
- The White Viking (1991)
- The 13th Warrior (1999)
- Pathfinder (2007)
- A Viking Saga (2008)
- Vicky the Viking (2009)
- Valhalla Rising (2009)
- Vikings (TV) (2013–2020)
- Northmen: A Viking Saga (2014)
- The Last Kingdom (TV) (2015–2022)
- Viking (2016)
- The Northman (2022)
- The Last Kingdom: Seven Kings Must Die (2023)

== Norman conquest of England (1066–1076) ==
- The War Lord (1965)
- 1066 The Battle for Middle Earth (2009)
- William the Young Conqueror (2015)

== Crusades (1095–1272) ==
- Richard the Lion-Hearted (1923)
- The Crusades (1935), a Cecil B. De Mille production, starring Henry Wilcoxon as Richard Lionheart
- The Saracen Blade (1954)
- King Richard and the Crusaders (1954)
- The Seventh Seal (1957)
- La Gerusalemme liberata (1958)
- El Naser Salah el Dine (1963)
- Robin and Marian (1976)
- Ivanhoe (1982) (TV)
- Hearts and Armour (1983)
- Robin Hood: Prince of Thieves (1991)
- I cavalieri che fecero l'impresa (2001)
- Soldier of God (2005)
- Kingdom of Heaven (2005), depiction of the Battle (Siege) of Jerusalem
- Arn (2007)
- Robin Hood (2018)

== Civil war era in Norway (1130 - 1240) ==
- The Last King (2016)

== Northern Crusades (1147–1410) ==
- Alexander Nevsky (1938)
- Knights of the Teutonic Order (1960)
- Kazimierz Wielki (1976)
- Alexander – Battle of the Neva (2008)
- The Pagan King (2018)

== Mongol conquests (1206–1324) ==
- The Adventures of Marco Polo (1938)
- The Black Rose (1950)
- Genghis Khan (1950) a Filipino film Directed by Manuel Conde
- The Golden Horde (1951)
- The Conqueror (1956)
- Marco Polo (1961)
- The Mongols (1961)
- Oh Islam (1961)
- Marco the Magnificent (1965)
- Genghis Khan (1965)
- Musa the Warrior (2001)
- Genghis Khan: To the Ends of the Earth and Sea (2007)
- Mongol (2007)
- Marco Polo (2007)
- An End to Killing (2013)
- Furious (2017)

== First Barons' War (1215–1217) ==
- Rogues of Sherwood Forest (1950)
- Robin Hood (2010)
- Ironclad (2011), The film chronicles the siege of Rochester Castle by King John in 1215.

== Ottoman wars in Europe (1299–1481) ==
=== Byzantine–Ottoman Wars (1299–1479) ===
- Florante at Laura (1939), depicting the history the war between the Byzantine Empire and Ottoman Empire
- Tirant el Blanco (2006)
- Fetih 1453 (Conquest 1453) (2012), Siege and Fall of Constantinople in 1453, marking the end of the Roman Empire

=== Ottoman Invasion of Serbia (1371–1459) ===
- Banović Strahinja (1981)
- Battle of Kosovo (1989)

=== Ottoman–Hungarian Wars (1421–1566) ===
- Gábor diák (1956)
- The Testament of Aga Koppanyi (1967)
- Egri Csillagok (Stars of Eger) (1968)
- A beszélő köntös (Talking Kaftan) (1969)
- Vlad Tepes (1979)
- Dark Prince: The True Story of Dracula (2000)

=== Skanderbeg's rebellion (1443–1468) ===
- The Great Warrior Skanderbeg (1954)

=== Ottoman invasion of Otranto (1480–1481) ===
- Flavia the Heretic (1974)

== Wars of Scottish Independence (1296–1328), (1332–1357) ==
- Braveheart (1995), depictions of the Battles of Stirling and Falkirk
- The Bruce (1996), depiction of the Battle of Bannockburn (1314)
- Outlaw King (2018)

== Hundred Years' War (1337–1453) ==
- The Passion of Joan of Arc (1928)
- Saint Joan the Maid (1929)
- Joan of Arc (1935)
- Henry V (1944)
- Joan of Arc (1948)
- The Dark Avenger (1955)
- Saint Joan (1957)
- Procès de Jeanne d'Arc (1962)
- Chimes at Midnight (1965)
- Henry V (1989)
- Joan the Maiden (1994)
- Joan of Arc (1999, TV miniseries)
- The Messenger: The Story of Joan of Arc (1999)
- Timeline (2003)
- The Silence of Joan (2011)
- The King (2019)
- The Last Duel (2021)

== Hussite Wars (1419–1434) ==
- Warriors of Faith (1947)
- Jan Hus (1954)
- Jan Žižka (1955)
- Against All (1957)
- Spanilá jízda (1963)
- Jan Hus (2015)
- Medieval (2022)

== Wars of the Roses (1455–1485) ==
- Richard III (1912)
- Tower of London (1939)
- Richard III (1955)
- Tower of London (1962)
- The Hollow Crown (2012)

== See also ==
- List of war films and TV specials
