= List of war films and TV specials set between 1453 and 1775 =

War depictions in film and television include documentaries, TV mini-series, and drama serials depicting aspects of historical wars, the films included here are films set in the early modern history from the fall of the Byzantine Empire in 1453 until about the Age of Revolution in late 18th century.

== Ottoman wars in Europe (1451-1813 ) ==
=== Habsburg-Ottoman wars in Hungary (1521-1718) ===
- Stars of Eger 1552 (1968)
- The Day of the Siege: September Eleven 1683 (2012)

=== Croatian–Slovene Peasant Revolt (1573) ===
- Anno Domini 1573 (1975)

=== Long Turkish War (1593–1606) ===
- Michael the Brave (1970)

=== Polish-Ottoman War (1620–1699) ===
- Colonel Wolodyjowski (1969)
- September Eleven 1683 (2012)

=== First Serbian Uprising (1804–1813) ===
- Život i dela besmrtnog vožda Karađorđa (1911)
- Vuk Karadžić (1987) (TV series)

== Sengoku Period (1467–1573) ==
- Sword for Hire (1952)
- The Seven Samurai (1954)
- Throne of Blood (1957)
- The Hidden Fortress (1958)
- The River Fuefuki (1960)
- Brave Records of the Sanada Clan (1963)
- Sengoku Yaro (1963)
- Samurai Spy (1965)
- Kagemusha (The Shadow Warrior) (1980)
- Shōgun (1980), (TV miniseries)
- Ran (1985)
- Rikyu (1989)
- Heaven and Earth (1990)
- Owls' Castle (1999)
- Samurai Commando: Mission 1549 (2005)
- The Floating Castle (2012)
- Ask This of Rikyu (2013)
- Sanada 10 Braves (2016)
- Nobunaga Concerto (2016)
- Sekigahara (2017)
- Honnōji Hotel (2017)
- Touken Ranbu (2019)
- Shōgun (2024), (TV series)

== Italian Wars (1494–1559) ==
- The Sack of Rome (1920)
- Condottieri (1937)
- Ettore Fieramosca (1938)
- The Violent Patriot (1956)
- Soldier of Fortune (1976), Challenge of Barletta
- Flesh and Blood (1985)
- The Profession of Arms (2001)
- Ignacio de Loyola (2016)

== Battle of Mactan (1521) ==
- Boundless (2022)

== German Peasants' War (1524-1525) ==
- The Death of the White Stallion (1985)

== Jiajing wokou raids (1540-1567) ==
- God of War (2017)

== French Wars of Religion (1562–1598) ==
- La Reine Margot (1954)
- La Reine Margot (Queen Margot) (1994)
- Henri 4 (2010)
- La princesse de Montpensier (2010)

== Eighty Years' War (1568–1648) ==
- La Kermesse Héroique (1935)
- De vliegende Hollander (1995)
- Alatriste (2006)
- Kenau (2014)

== Anglo-Spanish War (1585-1604) ==
- Fire Over England (1937)
- The Sea Hawk (1940)
- The Devil-Ship Pirates (1964)
- The Fighting Prince of Donegal (1966)
- Elizabeth: The Golden Age (2007)

== Japanese invasions of Korea (1592–98) ==
- Immortal Admiral Yi Sun-sin (2004)
- Blades of Blood (2010)
- The Admiral: Roaring Currents (2014)
- The Jingbirok: A Memoir of Imjin War (2015)
- Warriors of the Dawn (2017)
- Hansan: Rising Dragon (2022)
- Exhuma (2024)

== Polish–Muscovite War (1605–1618) ==
- Minin and Pozharsky (1939)
- Boris Godunov (1954)
- Boris Godunov (1986)
- Boris Godunov (1989)
- 1612 (2007)

== Anglo-Powhatan Wars (1609–1646) ==
- Pocahontas (1995)
- The New World (2005)

== Thirty Years' War (1618–1648) ==
- Wallenstein (1925)
- A Jester's Tale (1964)
- The Last Valley (1970)
- Alatriste (2006)
- May the Lord Be with Us (2018)

== Qing conquest of the Ming (1618–1683) ==
- Sword Stained with Royal Blood (1981)
- Sword Stained with Royal Blood (1993)
- The Sino-Dutch War 1661 (2000)
- The Showdown (2011)
- War of the Arrows (2011)
- Fall of Ming (2013)
- Brotherhood of Blades (2014)
- Brotherhood of Blades 2 (2016)
- The Fortress (2017)

== American Indian Wars (1622–1924) ==
- Custer's Last Stand (1936)
- North West Mounted Police (1940)
- They Died with Their Boots On (1941)
- Fort Apache (1948)
- She Wore a Yellow Ribbon (1949)
- Rio Grande (1950)
- Broken Arrow (1950)
- Only the Valiant (1951)
- The Battle at Apache Pass (1952)
- Brave Warrior (1952), fictionalised Battle of Tippecanoe
- Arrowhead (1953)
- Seminole (1953)
- 7th Cavalry (1953)
- The Battle of Rogue River (1954)
- Apache (1954)
- The Indian Fighter (1955)
- Davy Crockett, King of the Wild Frontier (1955), Creek War
- The Last Frontier (1955)
- A Distant Trumpet (1964)
- Cheyenne Autumn (1964)
- Major Dundee (1965)
- The Glory Guys (1965)
- The Sons of Great Bear (1966)
- Chingachgook, die große Schlange (1967)
- Custer of the West (1967)
- Little Big Man (1970), depiction of the Battle of Little Big Horn
- A Man Called Horse (1970)
- Soldier Blue (1970)
- Ulzana's Raid (1972)
- One Little Indian (1973)
- The Return of a Man Called Horse (1976)
- The Court-Martial of George Armstrong Custer (1977) (TV)
- Triumphs of a Man Called Horse (1983)
- Dances with Wolves (1990)
- Son of the Morning Star (1991) (TV)
- The Last of His Tribe (1992)
- Geronimo: An American Legend (1993)
- The Broken Chain (1993)
- Crazy Horse (1996) (TV)
- Stolen Women: Captured Hearts (1997)
- Buffalo Soldiers (1997), (TV)
- Spirit: Stallion of the Cimarron (2002)
- Hidalgo (2004)
- Bury My Heart at Wounded Knee (2007)
- Horizon: An American Saga – Chapter 1 (2024)

== English Civil War (1642–1651) ==
- The Royal Oak (1923)
- The Fighting Blade (1923)
- The Vicar of Bray (1937)
- The Exile (1947)
- Forever Amber (1947)
- The Moonraker (1958)
- The Crimson Blade (1963)
- Witchfinder General (1968)
- Cromwell (1970), depictions of the Battles of Edgehill and Naseby
- Winstanley (1975)
- To Kill a King (2003)
- Cromwell in Ireland (2008)
- The Devil's Whore (2008), numerous battles and skirmishes of the Civil War and the harrying of Ireland
- A Field in England (2013)

== Ukraino-Russian Liberation War from Poland (1648–1654) ==
- The Rebel Son (1938)
- Trista let tomu... (1956)
- Invasion 1700 (1962)
- Taras Bulba (1962)
- With Fire and Sword (1999)
- Taras Bulba (2009)

== Polish Commonwealth Wars (1648–1672) ==
- Potop (The Deluge) (1974)

== Anglo-Dutch War (1652-1674) ==
- Michiel de Ruyter (film) (2015) Dutch admiral Michiel de Ruyter

== War of Louis XIV（1660–1715） ==
- The Golden Hawk (1952)
- La prise de pouvoir par Louis XIV (1966)
- Louis, the Child King (1993)
- Revenge of the Musketeers (1994)
- Marquise (1997)
- Vatel (2000)
- La Femme Musketeer (2004)
- The Death of Louis XIV (2016)

== Scanian War (1675–1679) ==
- Snapphanar (2006)

== Jacobite risings (1688–1746) ==
- Kidnapped (1917)
- Bonnie Prince Charlie (1923)
- Kidnapped (1935)
- Kidnapped (1938)
- Kidnapped (1948)
- Bonnie Prince Charlie (1948)
- The Master of Ballantrae (1953)
- Kidnapped (1960)
- Culloden (1964)
- Kidnapped (1971)
- The Master of Ballantrae (1984)
- Kidnapped (1986)
- Chasing the Deer (1994)
- Rob Roy (1995)
- Kidnapped (1995)

== Great Northern War (1700–1721) ==
- Karl XII (1925)
- Pyotr perviy (Petr the First) (1937–1938) (Петр первый in Russia)
- Kalabaliken i Bender (1983)
- Sluga Gosudarev (The Sovereign's Servant) (2007) (Слуга государев in Russia)

== Rákóczi's War of Independence (1703–1711) ==
- Rákóczi nótája (1943)
- Rákóczi hadnagya (1954)

== Hungary during Absolutism of the Habsburgs (1711–1848) ==
- A császár parancsára (1957)
- Szegény gazdagok (1959)

== War of the Austrian Succession (1740–1748) ==
- Fanfan la Tulipe (2003)

== Guaraní War (1754–1756) ==
- The Mission (1986)

== French and Indian War (1754–1763) ==
- The Deerslayer and Chingachgook (1920) German silent film
- The Last of the Mohicans (1920)
- The Last of the Mohicans (1920)
- Leatherstocking (1924)
- The Last of the Mohicans (1936)
- Northwest Passage (1940)
- Unconquered (1947)
- The Iroquois Trail (1950)
- Fort Ti (1953)
- The Last of the Mohicans (1992)
- Battle of the Brave (2004)
- The War that Made America (2006)
- Young Washington (2026)

== Seven Years' War (1756–1763) ==
- Fanfan la Tulipe (1925)
- Das Flötenkonzert von Sans-souci (1930)
- Clive of India (1935)
- Fanfan la Tulipe (1952)
- Barry Lyndon (1975)
- Fanfan la Tulipe (2003)

== Pugachev's Rebellion (1773–1775) ==
- Salavat Yulayev (1940)
- The Captain's Daughter (1947)
- Tempest (1958)

== See also ==
List of war films and TV specials
