= List of terrorism films =

This is a list of terrorism-related films.

== Non-fiction ==
These films are about or based on actual events, they are either live-action and/or documentary.

=== Afghanistan ===
- Charlie Wilson's War (2007)
- Lions for Lambs (2007)
- Lone Survivor (2013)
- 12 Strong (2018)

=== Bangladesh ===
- Dhaka Attack (2017)
- Jannat (2018)
- Mission Extreme (2021)
- Black War: Mission Extreme 2 (2023)

=== France ===
- Day of the Jackal (1973)
- L'Assaut (2010)
- Carlos (2010)
- Made in France (2015)
- Eagles of Death Metal: Nos Amis (Our Friends) (2017)
- The 15:17 to Paris (2018)

=== Germany ===
- Munich (2005)
- The Baader Meinhof Complex (2008)

=== India ===
- Roja (1992)
- Drohkaal (1994)
- Maachis (1996)
- Dil Se.. (1998)
- Swasthik (1999)
- The Terrorist (1999)
- Azad (2000)
- Badal (2000)
- Fiza (2000)
- Mission Kashmir (2000)
- Indian (2001)
- Kannathil Muthamittal (2002)
- Khadgam (2003)
- Black Friday (2005)
- Fanaa (2006)
- Keerthi Chakra (2006)
- Dhokha (2007)
- Mukhbir (2008)
- Aamir (2008)
- Mission 90 Days (2008)
- Mumbai Meri Jaan (2008)
- A Wednesday! (2009)
- Kurbaan (2009)
- Mission Istanbul (2009)
- Unnaipol Oruvan (2009)
- Sikandar (2009)
- New York (2009)
- Kandahar (2010)
- Velayudham (2011)
- Agent Vinod (2012)
- Thuppakki (2012)
- My Name Is Khan (2010)
- The Attacks of 26/11 (2013)
- Vishwaroopam (2013)
- Holiday (2014)
- Baby
- Mr. X (2015)
- Phantom (2015)
- Neerja (2016)
- Airlift (2016)
- 1971: Beyond Borders(2017)
- Tiger Zinda Hai (2017)
- Omerta (2017)
- Raazi (2018)
- Hotel Mumbai (2018)
- Uri: The Surgical Strike (2019)
- Blank (2019)
- India's Most Wanted (2019)
- Sooryavanshi (2021)
- Beast (2022)

=== Iraq ===
- Saving Jessica Lynch (2003) (TV)
- Over There (2005) (TV series)
- The Tiger and the Snow (2005)
- Valley of the Wolves Iraq (2006)
- A Line in the Sand (2006)
- Redacted (2007)
- The Mark of Cain (2007) (TV)
- Body of Lies (2008)
- The Hurt Locker (2008)
- Stop Loss (2008)
- No True Glory: Battle for Fallujah (2009)
- American Soldiers (2005)
- Iraq war documentaries (2004-2007)
- Route Irish (2010)
- Three Kings (1999)
- Fair Game (2010 film)
- The Lady of Heaven (2021)

=== Iran ===
- Syriana (2005)
- Argo (2012)
- Septembers of Shiraz (2016)

=== Ireland ===
- Michael Collins (1996)
- The General (1998)
- The Wind That Shakes the Barley (2006)
- '71 (2014)

=== Libya ===
- Lion of the Desert (1981)
- 13 Hours: The Secret Soldiers of Benghazi (2016)

=== Norway ===
- 22 July (film) (2018)
- U:july 22 (film) (2019)

=== Pakistan ===
- A Mighty Heart (2007)
- Zero Dark Thirty (2012)
- Waar (2013)
- Yalghar (2016)

=== Philippines ===
- The Hunt for Eagle One (2006)

=== Saudi Arabia ===
- The Kingdom (2007)

=== South Africa ===
- Black Terrorist (1978)
- Catch a Fire (2006)
- Namibia: The Struggle for Liberation (2007)
- Endgame (2009)

=== Uganda ===
- Who Killed Captain Alex? (2010) (Note: Fictional, but inspired by the LRA insurgency.)

=== United Kingdom ===
- Who Dares Wins (1982) (U.S. title: The Final Option) (Note: Fictional, but largely inspired by the Iranian Embassy siege of 1980.)
- Bloody Sunday (2002)
- Five Minutes of Heaven (2009)
- In the Name of the Father (1994)
- Omagh (2004)
- Hunger (2008)
- Four Lions (2010)
- Cleanskin (2012)
- Suffragette (2015)
- 6 Days (2017)

=== United States ===
- DC 9/11: Time of Crisis (2003) (TV)
- Flight 93 (2006) (TV)
- United 93 (2006)
- The Path to 9/11 (2006) (TV)
- World Trade Center (2006)
- New York (2009)
- Patriots Day (2016)

== Fiction ==
These films are about fictional events. They are selected on the criteria based on either (1) the plots involve the use of actual or fictitious terror groups and events, or (2) the overall storyline incorporates the essence of a terror attack. (i.e. Goldfinger (1964) was not a terror attack on Fort Knox, but rather a means for financial gains. Thunderball (1965), although is also based on financial gains, the plot involved the use of ransom and terror to achieve this goal.)

- '71 (2014)
- Air Force One (1997)
- Air Force One Down (2024)
- Airheads (1994)
- Airport (1970)
- American Assassin (2017)
- Angel Has Fallen (2019)
- Arlington Road (1999)
- Assault on Dome 4 (1996)
- Back to the Future (1985)
- Batman Begins (2005)
- Betrayed (1988)
- Black Sunday (1977)
- Blown Away (1994)
- Body of Lies (2008)
- The Boxer (1997)
- Broken Arrow (1996)
- Cal (1984)
- Casino Royale (2006)
- Cleanskin (2012)
- Cliffhanger (1993)
- Commando (1985)
- The Crying Game (1992)
- The Dark Knight (2008)
- The Dark Knight Rises (2012)
- The Day of the Jackal (1973)
- Dead Bang (1989)
- Death Before Dishonor (1987)
- The Delta Force (1986)
- The Devil's Own (1997)
- Diamonds Are Forever (1971)
- Die Hard (1988 - 2013)
- The Doomsday Flight (1966)
- Dr. No (1962)
- The Enforcer (1976)
- Eraser (1996)
- Executive Decision (1996)
- Eye in the Sky (2015)
- Face/Off (1997)
- Fifty Dead Men Walking (2008)
- Five Fingers (2006)
- Flightplan (2005)
- The Foreigner (2017)
- Homeland (2011-)
- Imperium (2016)
- Incredibles 2 (2018)
- Invasion U.S.A (1985)
- The Jackal (1997)
- Jack Ryan: Shadow Recruit (2014)
- The Kidnapping of the President (1980)
- The Kingdom (2007)
- The Living Daylights (1987)
- London Has Fallen (2016)
- Nighthawks (1981)
- No Escape (film) (2015)
- Non-Stop (film) (2014)
- Octopussy (1983)
- Olympus Has Fallen (2013)
- The Park Is Mine (1986)
- Passenger 57 (1992)
- Patriot Games (1992)
- The Peacemaker (1997)
- Ransom / The Terrorists (1975)
- Red Eye (2005)
- The Rock (1996)
- Rollercoaster (1977)
- Ronin (1998)
- Runaway (1984)
- Second in Command (2006)
- The Siege (1998)
- Skyfall (2012)
- Speed (1994)
- Speed 2: Cruise Control (1997)
- The Sum of All Fears (2002)
- Sweet Bunch (1983)
- Thunderball (1965)
- Toy Soldiers (1991)
- Traitor (2008)
- True Lies (1994)
- Two-Minute Warning (1976)
- Under Siege (1992)
- Under Siege 2: Dark Territory (1995)
- Unthinkable (2010)
- Vantage Point (2008)
- The World Is Not Enough (1999)
- Wrong Is Right (1982)
- White House Down (2013)
- XXX: State of the Union (2005)
- Zootopia (2016)
