= List of documentary films about video games =

The following is a list of documentaries about video games.

== 2000s ==
=== 2006 ===
Title	Director/s	Subject
8BIT	Marcin Ramocki Justin Strawhand	The intersections of video games, art, and music

=== 2007 ===
Title	Director/s	Subject
Chasing Ghosts: Beyond the Arcade	Lincoln Ruchti	The golden age of video arcade games
The King of Kong: A Fistful of Quarters	Seth Gordon	The rivalry between Billy Mitchell and Steve Wiebe over the Donkey Kong record high score

=== 2008 ===
Title	Director/s	Subject
Frag	Mike Pasley	Professional video gaming
Second Skin	Juan Carlos Pineiro Escoriaza	Follows seven people through the world of MMORPGs

== 2010s ==
=== 2011 ===
Title	Director/s	Subject
Ecstasy of Order: The Tetris Masters	Adam Cornelius	A documentary following world-record holding Tetris players as they prepare for the 2010 Championships

=== 2012 ===
Title	Director/s	-
Indie Game: The Movie	James Swirsky Lisanne Pajot	Documentary about the struggles of independent game developers Edmund McMillen and Tommy Refenes during the development of Super Meat Boy, Phil Fish during the development of Fez, and also Jonathan Blow, who reflects on the success of Braid.

=== 2015 ===
Title	Director/s	Subject
Thank You for Playing	David Osit Malika Zouhali-Worrall	Follows the creation of the arthouse video game That Dragon, Cancer
The Lost Arcade	Kurt Vincent	About the influence of the Chinatown Fair arcade on the fighting game community and New York City as a whole.

=== 2017 ===
Title	Director/s	Subject
Moleman 4 - Longplay	Szilárd Matusik	A documentary which recounts the so far little-known story of the beginnings of video game development behind the Iron Curtain. Outfoxed Nintendo, surprised Commodore engineers, The Last Ninja story, a games software outfit that dodged the limelight and led the world.
Polybius: The Video Game That Doesn't Exist	Stuart Brown	About the urban legend of Polybius.

=== 2019 ===
Title	Director/s	Subject
League of Legends Origins	Leslie Iwerks	Fans, experts and creators of the League of Legends detail the game's rise from free demo to global esports titan.
Uncle Art	Lucy Lowe	The story of the man behind some of the most memorable gaming music of the '80s and '90s -- Starglider, Carrier Command, Beneath a Steel Sky, After Burner and more: Dave Lowe.

== 2020s ==
=== 2022 ===
Title	Director/s	Subject
Cannon Arm and the Arcade Quest	Mads Hedegaard	Following the attempts of Kim "Cannon Arm" Kobke to break the world record of arcade game Gyruss.

=== 2023 ===
Title	Director/s	Subject
Running With Speed	Patrick Lope Nicholas Mross	Documentary about the speedrunning community narrated by speedrunning historian Summoning Salt.
FPS: First Person Shooter	David L. Craddock Christopher Stratton	Bringing together the largest ensemble of gaming icons ever assembled on screen, FPS: First Person Shooter takes fans on a nostalgic journey through classics from Doom and Duke Nukem 3D to GoldenEye 007, Halo, and beyond.

=== 2024 ===
Title	Director/s	Subject
Grand Theft Hamlet	Sam Crane Pinny Grylls	Documentary about a production of William Shakespeare's Hamlet delivered entirely in Grand Theft Auto Online during the COVID-19 lockdown in England in 2020.

=== 2025 ===
Title	Director/s	Subject	
George A. Romero's Resident Evil	Brandon Salisbury	2025	About the unrealized film adaptation of the horror video game series Resident Evil, for which filmmaker George A. Romero was considered as a director.

== See also ==
- List of films based on video games
