= List of LGBTQ-related films of the 1940s =

This is a list of lesbian, gay, bisexual, transgender or queer-related films released in the 1940s. It contains theatrically released films that deal with important gay, lesbian, bisexual, transgender or queer characters or issues and may have same-sex romance or relationships as a plot device.

== 1940s ==
Title	Year	Director	Country	Genre	Cast	Notes
The Seventh Victim	1943	Mark Robson	United States	Horror, film-noir	Tom Conway, Jean Brooks, Isabel Jewell, Kim Hunter, Evelyn Brent, Erford Gage, Ben Bard, Hugh Beaumont	
Rome, Open City	1944	Roberto Rossellini	Italy	War, drama	Anna Magnani, Aldo Fabrizi, Marcello Pagliero	A supporting female character is forced into a lesbian relationship with a German woman during the Nazi occupation of Rome.
Children of Paradise	1945	Marcel Carné	France	Drama, romance	Arletty, Jean-Louis Barrault, Pierre Brasseur, Marcel Herrand, Pierre Renoir, María Casares, Louis Salou, Gaston Modot, Fabien Loris	Though not overtly stated, the antagonist, Lacenaire, is implied to be in a gay relationship with his henchman, Avril.
The Lost Weekend	1945	Billy Wilder	United States	Film-noir, drama	Ray Milland, Jane Wyman, Phillip Terry, Howard Da Silva, Doris Dowling, Frank Faylen, Mary Young, Anita Sharp-Bolster (credited as Anita Bolster), Lilian Fontaine, Frank Orth, Lewis Russell	Although Billy Wilder's adaptation hews closely to Charles R. Jackson's novel, the novel differed in one respect: Birnam, played by Ray Milland in the movie, is described in the novel as being tormented by a homosexual incident in college. That is omitted from the film.
Crossfire	1947	Edward Dmytryk	United States	Film-noir, crime	Robert Young, Robert Mitchum, Robert Ryan, Gloria Grahame, Paul Kelly, Sam Levene, Jacqueline White, Steve Brodie, George Cooper, Richard Benedict, Tom Keene (credited as Richard Powers), William Phipps, Lex Barker, Marlo Dwyer	Based on the novel The Brick Foxhole by Richard Brooks
Quai des Orfèvres	1947	Henri-Georges Clouzot	France	Police Procedural, Drama	Suzy Delair, Bernard Blier, Louis Jouvet, Simone Renant, Pierre Larquey, Jeanne Fusier-Gir, Claudine Dupuis, Charles Dullin, Henri Arius, Jacques Grétillat	Features a lesbian character who is infatuated with the female protagonist
Fireworks	1947	Kenneth Anger	United States	Drama		
Germany, Year Zero	1948	Roberto Rossellini	Italy	Drama		
Red River	1948	Howard Hawks	United States	Western	John Wayne, Montgomery Clift, Walter Brennan, Joanne Dru, Coleen Gray, Harry Carey, John Ireland, Chief Yowlachie, Paul Fix, Hank Worden, Ray Hyke, Wally Wales, Mickey Kuhn, Robert M. Lopez	
Rope	1948	Alfred Hitchcock	United States	Crime, drama	James Stewart, John Dall, Farley Granger, Joan Chandler, Cedric Hardwicke (credited as Sir Cedric Hardwicke), Constance Collier, Douglas Dick, Edith Evanson, Dick Hogan	Based on the play of the same name by Patrick Hamilton, itself loosely based on the Leopold and Loeb case. The homosexual relationship between the two criminal protagonists is implied rather than overtly stated.
Words and Music	1948	Norman Taurog	United States	Musical, biography	Tom Drake, Mickey Rooney, Janet Leigh, Marshall Thompson, Betty Garrett, Jeanette Nolan, Ann Sothern, Perry Como, Cyd Charisse, Richard Quine, Emory Parnell	Lorenz Hart (1895–1943) was a homosexual in an era when such was flatly unacceptable; the pressures of the closet drove him into a wildly self-destructive alcoholism that ultimately killed him. None of this is in the movie.
The Trip to Marrakesh	1949	Richard Eichberg	West Germany	Drama	Luise Ullrich, Maria Holst, Karl Ludwig Diehl, Paul Dahlke, Grethe Weiser, Ludwig Linkmann, Michael Korrontay, Günther Evers, Viktor Afritsch, Ernst Fritz Fürbringer	
Thirst	1949	Ingmar Bergman	Sweden	Drama	Eva Henning, Birger Malmsten, Birgit Tengroth, Hasse Ekman, Mimi Nelson, Bengt Eklund, Gaby Stenberg, Naima Wifstrand, Verner Arpe, Calle Flygare, Sven-Eric Gamble, Helge Hagerman, Else-Merete Heiberg, Estrid Hesse, Gunnar Nielsen, Sif Ruud, Monica Weinzierl	Based on the novel of the same name by Birgit Tengroth
Between Eleven and Midnight	1949	Henri Decoin	France	Drama, Mystery	Louis Jouvet, Madeleine Robinson, Monique Mélinand, Léo Lapara, Robert Vattier, Yvette Etiévant, Gisèle Casadesus	Features two homosexual gangsters
