= List of LGBTQ-related films of the 1950s =

This is a list of lesbian, gay, bisexual, transgender or queer-related films released in the 1950s. It contains theatrically released films that deal with important gay, lesbian, bisexual, transgender or queer characters or issues and may have same-sex romance or relationships as a plot device.

== 1950 ==
Title	Director	Country	Genre	Cast	Notes
Caged	John Cromwell	United States	Crime, drama	Eleanor Parker, Agnes Moorehead, Ellen Corby, Hope Emerson, Betty Garde, Sheila MacRae, Lee Patrick, Jane Darwell	Parker plays a woman sent to prison for attempted armed robbery. In prison, she meets several lesbian characters.
In a Lonely Place	Nicholas Ray	United States	Drama, film-noir	Humphrey Bogart, Gloria Grahame, Frank Lovejoy, Carl Benton Reid, Art Smith, Martha Stewart, Jeff Donnell, Robert Warwick, Morris Ankrum, William Ching, Steven Geray, Hadda Brooks	Based on the novel of the same name by Dorothy B. Hughes
Un chant d'amour	Jean Genet	France			a.k.a. A Song of Love
Young Man with a Horn	Michael Curtiz	United States	Drama	Kirk Douglas, Lauren Bacall, Doris Day, Hoagy Carmichael, Juano Hernandez, Jerome Cowan, Mary Beth Hughes, Nestor Paiva, Walter Reed	Based on the novel of the same name by Dorothy Baker, which itself is based on the life of Bix Beiderbecke; an example of film noir with Bacall playing a central female character who is bisexual.
Girl with Hyacinths	Hasse Ekman	Sweden	Film-noir, crime, Drama	Eva Henning, Ulf Palme, Anders Ek, Birgit Tengroth, Marianne Lofgren, Gösta Cederlund, Karl-Arne Holmsten, Keve Hjelm, Anne-Marie Brunius	

== 1951 ==
Title	Director	Country	Genre	Cast	Notes
Olivia	Jacqueline Audry	France	Drama	Edwige Feuillère, Simone Simon, Marie-Claire Olivia, Yvonne de Bray, Suzanne Dehelly, Marina de Berg, Lesly Meynard, Danièle Delorme, Rina Rhéty, Tania Soucault, Elly Norden, Nadine Olivier	a.k.a. The Pit of Loneliness; based on the semi-autobiographical novel by Dorothy Bussy
Strangers on a Train	Alfred Hitchcock	United States	Film-noir, crime, mystery	Farley Granger, Ruth Roman, Robert Walker, Leo G. Carroll	Based on the novel of the same name by Patricia Highsmith

== 1953 ==
Title	Director	Country	Genre	Cast	Notes
Calamity Jane	David Butler	United States	Musical, comedy	Doris Day, Howard Keel, Allyn Ann McLerie, Philip Carey, Dick Wesson, Paul Harvey, Chubby Johnson, Gale Robbins, Francis McDonald, Monte Montague, Bess Flowers	Explores an alleged romance between American frontierswoman of the same name and Wild Bill Hickok
Glen or Glenda	Edward D. Wood Jr.	United States	Drama	Ed Wood, Timothy Farrell, Dolores Fuller, Bela Lugosi	
Gentlemen Prefer Blondes	Howard Hawks	United States	Musical, comedy	Jane Russell, Marilyn Monroe, Charles Coburn, Elliott Reid, Tommy Noonan, Taylor Holmes, Norma Varden, George Winslow, Steven Geray	Based on the musical of the same name by Anita Loos and Joseph Fields, which itself is based on Loos' novel of the same name
I Vitelloni	Federico Fellini	Italy	Drama, comedy	Alberto Sordi, Franco Fabrizi, Franco Interlenghi, Leopoldo Trieste	

== 1954 ==
Title	Director	Country	Genre	Cast	Notes
Adam is Eve	René Gaveau	France	Comedy	Michèle Carvel, Jean Carmet, Thérèse Dorny, Mireille Perrey, Antoine Balpêtré, Anouk Ferjac	Lead's name is sometimes listed as Micheline Carvel
Air of Paris	Marcel Carné	France; Italy	Drama	Jean Gabin, Arletty, Roland Lesaffre	Implicit homosexuality in the relation between the characters played by Lesaffre and Gabin
Huis clos	Jacqueline Audry	France	Drama	Arletty, Gaby Sylvia, Frank Villard, Yves Deniaud, Nicole Courcel, Danièle Delorme, Jean Debucourt, Jacques Chabassol, Arlette Thomas	a.k.a. No Exit; co-written by Jean-Paul Sartre, based on his stage play of the same name
Johnny Guitar	Nicholas Ray	United States	Western	Joan Crawford, Sterling Hayden, Mercedes McCambridge, Scott Brady, Ward Bond, Ben Cooper, Ernest Borgnine, John Carradine, Royal Dano, Frank Ferguson, Paul Fix, Rhys Williams, Ian MacDonald, Robert Osterloh	Based on the novel of the same name by Roy Chanslor
Miss Hanafi	Fatin Abdel Wahab	Egypt	Comedy	Ismail Yassine (credited as Ismail Yasseen)	a.k.a. El Anesa Hanafy; based on an actual news article

== 1955 ==
Title	Director	Country	Genre	Cast	Notes
Rebel Without a Cause	Nicholas Ray	United States	Drama	James Dean, Natalie Wood, Sal Mineo, Jim Backus, Ann Doran, Corey Allen, William Hopper	Homosexual subtext
The Big Combo	Joseph H. Lewis	United States	Crime	Cornel Wilde, Richard Conte, Brian Donlevy, Jean Wallace	Implicit homosexual relationship between two hitmen

== 1956 ==
Title	Director	Country	Genre	Cast	Notes
Tea and Sympathy	Vincente Minnelli	United States	Drama	Deborah Kerr, John Kerr, Leif Erikson, Edward Andrews	Screenplay by Robert Anderson, based on his stage play of the same name

== 1957 ==
Title	Director	Country	Genre	Cast	Notes
Different from You and Me	Veit Harlan	West Germany	Drama	Christian Wolff, Paula Wessely, Paul Dahlke, Hans Nielsen	a.k.a. Anders als du und ich (censored version title) / Das dritte Geschlecht (original title) / Bewildered Youth / The Third Sex (American alternative titles)

== 1958 ==
Title	Director	Country	Genre	Cast	Notes
Cat on a Hot Tin Roof	Richard Brooks	United States	Drama	Elizabeth Taylor, Paul Newman, Burl Ives, Judith Anderson, Jack Carson, Madeleine Sherwood, Larry Gates, Vaughn Taylor	Based on the play on the same name by Tennessee Williams; homosexual subtext
Les Tricheurs	Marcel Carné	France; Italy	Drama	Pascale Petit, Andréa Parisy, Laurent Terzieff, Jean-Paul Belmondo, Dany Saval	
Mädchen in Uniform	Géza von Radványi	West Germany; France	Drama	Hertha Thiele, Dorothea Wieck, Emilia Unda	Co-written by Christa Winsloe, based on her play of the same name

== 1959 ==
Title	Director	Country	Genre	Cast	Notes
Ben-Hur	William Wyler	United States	Action, drama	Charlton Heston, Jack Hawkins, Haya Harareet, Stephen Boyd, Hugh Griffith, Martha Scott, Cathy O'Donnell, Sam Jaffe	Based on the novel Ben-Hur: A Tale of the Christ by Lew Wallace
Come Dance with Me	Michel Boisrond	France	Drama, crime	Brigitte Bardot, Henri Vidal, Dawn Addams, Darío Moreno, Serge Gainsbourg	Based on the novel The Blonde Died Dancing by Kelley Roos
Compulsion	Richard Fleischer	United States	Crime, drama	Orson Welles, Diane Varsi, Dean Stockwell, Bradford Dillman	Based on the novel of the same name by Meyer Levin
Hidden Homicide	Tony Young	United Kingdom	Crime, drama	Griffith Jones, Patricia Laffan, James Kenney	Based on the novel Death at Shinglestrand by Paul Capon
Pillow Talk	Michael Gordon	United States	Romance, comedy	Rock Hudson, Doris Day, Tony Randall, Thelma Ritter	
Some Like It Hot	Billy Wilder	United States	Romance, comedy	Marilyn Monroe, Tony Curtis, Jack Lemmon	
Suddenly, Last Summer	Joseph L. Mankiewicz	United States	Drama, horror	Elizabeth Taylor, Katharine Hepburn, Montgomery Clift	Based on the play of the same name by Tennessee Williams
