= List of LGBTQ-related films of 1960 =

This is a list of lesbian, gay, bisexual, transgender or queer-related films released in 1960. It contains theatrically released films that deal with important gay, lesbian, bisexual, transgender or queer characters or issues and may have same-sex romance or relationships as a plot device.

== Films ==
Title	Director	Country	Genre	Cast	Notes
Bahia de Todos os Santos	Trigueirinho Neto	Brazil	Drama	Lola Brah, Sadi Cabral, Francisco Contreras, Maria Lúcia Dahl, Arassary de Oliveira and Geraldo Del Rey	
Boulevard	Julien Duvivier	France		Jean-Pierre Léaud, Magali Noël, Pierre Mondy	
Oscar Wilde	Gregory Ratoff	United Kingdom	Biography, Drama	Robert Morley, Ralph Richardson, Phyllis Calvert, John Neville, Alexander Knox, Dennis Price, Edward Chapman and Martin Benson	
Spartacus	Stanley Kubrick	United States	Action, adventure	Kirk Douglas, Laurence Olivier, Jean Simmons, Charles Laughton, Peter Ustinov, Tony Curtis, John Gavin, John Dall, Nina Foch, John Ireland, Herbert Lom, Charles McGraw, Joanna Barnes, Harold J. Stone, Woody Strode, Peter Brocco, Paul Lambert, Robert J. Wilke, Nick Dennis, John Hoyt and Frederick Worlock	Based on the novel of the same name by Howard Fast
