= List of LGBTQ-related films of 1971 =

This is a list of lesbian, gay, bisexual, transgender or queer-related films released in 1971. It contains theatrically released films that deal with important gay, lesbian, bisexual, transgender or queer characters or issues and may have same-sex romance or relationships as a plot device.

== Films ==
| Title | Director | Country | Genre | Cast | Notes |
|---|---|---|---|---|---|
| Bananas | Woody Allen | United States | Comedy | Woody Allen, Louise Lasser, Carlos Montalbán | |
| The Boy Friend | Ken Russell | United Kingdom; United States | Musical, comedy | Twiggy, Christopher Gable, Max Adrian | Based on the musical of the same name by Sandy Wilson |
| A Casa Assassinada | Paulo Cesar Saraceni | Brazil | Drama | Rubens Araújo, Norma Bengell, Nelson Dantas, Joseph Guerreiro, Leina Krespi, Carlos Kroeber, Augusto Lorenzo, Tetê Medina and Nuno Veloso | a.k.a. The Murdered House |
| The Cat o' Nine Tails | Dario Argento | Italy; France; West Germany | Thriller | James Franciscus, Karl Malden, Catherine Spaak | a.k.a. Il gatto a nove code |
| Clinic Exclusive | Don Chaffey | United Kingdom | Erotic | Georgina Ward, Alexander Davion | |
| Daughters of Darkness | Harry Kümel | Belgium; France; West Germany | Horror | Delphine Seyrig, Danielle Ouimet, John Karlen and Andrea Rau | a.k.a. Les Lèvres Rouges, Le Rouge aux Lèvres |
| Death in Venice | Luchino Visconti | France; Italy | Drama | Dirk Bogarde, Mark Burns, Marisa Berenson, Björn Andrésen, Silvana Mangano, Romolo Valli, Nora Ricci, Franco Fabrizi, Carole André, Sergio Garfagnoli and Luigi Battaglia | Based on the novella of the same name by Thomas Mann a.k.a. Morte a Venezia |
| Diamonds Are Forever | Guy Hamilton | United Kingdom; United States | Action, thriller | Sean Connery,Jill St. John, Charles Gray, Lana Wood, Jimmy Dean, Bruce Cabot | |
| Don't Deliver Us from Evil | Joël Séria | France | Drama | Jeanne Goupil, Catherine Wagener | Loosely based on the Parker-Hulme murder case a.k.a. Mais ne nous délivrez pas du mal |
| Fortune and Men's Eyes | Harvey Hart | Canada; United States | Drama | Wendell Burton, Michael Greer, Zooey Hall, Danny Freedman, Larry Perkins, James Barron, Lázaro Pérez, Jon Granik | |
| The Friends | Gérard Blain | France | Drama | Philippe March, Jean-Claude Dauphin, Nathalie Fontaine, Yann Favre, Dany Roussel, Claude Larcher, Hélène Zanicolli, Christian Chevreuse, Martin Pierlot, Liliane Valais and Vincent Gauthier | a.k.a. Les Amis |
| Girl Stroke Boy | Bob Kellett | United Kingdom | Comedy, drama | Joan Greenwood, Michael Hordern, Clive Francis, Peter Straker, Patricia Routledge, Peter Bull | Based on the play Girlfriend by David Percival |
| I'm Going to Get You, Elliott Boy | Ed Forsyth | Canada | Prison drama | Ross Stephanson, Maureen McGill, Abdullah the Butcher | |
| It Is Not the Homosexual Who Is Perverse, But the Society in Which He Lives | Rosa von Praunheim | West Germany | Documentary, Drama | Berryt Bohlen, Bernd Feuerhelm, Ernst Kuchling and Norbert Losch | a.k.a. Nicht der Homosexuelle ist pervers, sondern die Situation, in der er lebt |
| Lust for a Vampire | Jimmy Sangster | United Kingdom; United States | Horror | Ralph Bates, Barbara Jefford, Suzanna Leigh | |
| The Music Lovers | Ken Russell | United Kingdom | Drama | Richard Chamberlain, Glenda Jackson | Based on Beloved Friend, a collection of letters edited by Catherine Drinker Bowen and Barbara von Meck |
| La noche de Walpurgis | León Klimovsky | Spain; West Germany | Horror | Paul Naschy, Gaby Fuchs, Barbara Capell, Andrés Resino, Yelena Samarina, José Marco, Betsabé Ruiz, Barta Barri, Luis Gaspar, Ruperto Ares, María Luisa Tovar, Julio Peña, Patty Shepard and Eduardo Chappa | Released in the United States as The Werewolf vs. The Vampire Woman, and in the UK as Shadow of the Werewolf |
| Pink Narcissus | James Bidgood | United States | Drama | Terence Stamp, Jean-Claude Brialy, Florinda Bolkan, Niké Arrighi | |
| A Season in Hell | Nelo Risi | Italy | Drama | Don Brooks, Bobby Kendall and Charles Ludlam | Based on the life and death of the poet Arthur Rimbaud and his troubled relationship with the poet Paul Verlaine |
| The Shiver of the Vampires | Jean Rollin | France | Horror | Sandra Julien, Jean-Marie Durand, Jacques Robiolles, Michel Delahaye, Marie-Pierre Castel, Kuelan Herce, Nicole Nancel and Dominique | a.k.a. Le Frisson des Vampires, also released in English under several other names. |
| Some of My Best Friends Are... | Mervyn Nelson | United States | Drama | Fannie Flagg, Rue McClanahan, Candy Darling, David Drew, Tom Bade, Jim Enzel, Jeff David, Nick Denoia, Clifton Steere, James Murdock (credited as David Baker), Paul Blake, Carleton Carpenter, Robert Christian, Dick O'Neill, Gary Campbell, Gil Gerard, Lou Steele, Uva Harden, Ben Yaffe, Gary Sandy, Peg Murray and Sylvia Syms | |
| Sunday Bloody Sunday | John Schlesinger | United Kingdom | Drama | Peter Finch, Glenda Jackson, Murray Head, Peggy Ashcroft, Tony Britton, Maurice Denham, Bessie Love, Vivian Pickles, Frank Windsor, Thomas Baptiste, Richard Pearson, June Brown, Hannah Norbert, Harold Goldblatt, Russell Lewis, Marie Burke, Caroline Blakiston, Peter Halliday, Jon Finch, Robert Rietti, Douglas Lambert, Niké Arrighi, Edward Evans, Gabrielle Daye and Esta Charkham | |
| Twins of Evil | John Hough | United Kingdom | Horror | Peter Cushing, Kathleen Byron, Mary Collinson, Madeleine Collinson, Damien Thomas and David Warbeck | |
| Vanishing Point | Richard C. Sarafian | United States; United Kingdom | Action, drama | Barry Newman, Cleavon Little, Dean Jagger, Victoria Medlin, Karl Swenson, Lee Weaver, John Amos, Tom Reese, Paul Koslo, Robert Donner, Owen Bush, Bill Drake, Severn Darden, Delaney Bramlett, Bonnie Bramlett, Bekka Bramlett, Rita Coolidge, Patrice Holloway, David Gates, Anthony James, Arthur Malet, Timothy Scott, Gilda Texter and Charlotte Rampling | |
| Vampyros Lesbos | Jesús Franco | Spain West Germany | Horror | Ewa Strömberg, Soledad Miranda, Andrea Montchal, Dennis Price and Paul Müller | a.k.a. Las Vampiras |
| The Velvet Vampire | Stephanie Rothman | United States | Horror | Celeste Yarnall, Michael Blodgett and Sherry Miles | a.k.a. Cemetery Girls |
| Villain | Michael Tuchner | United Kingdom | Crime, thriller | Richard Burton, Ian McShane, Nigel Davenport, Fiona Lewis, Joss Ackland, T. P. McKenna, Donald Sinden, Cathleen Nesbitt, Colin Welland, Tony Selby, Del Henney, John Hallam, James Cossins, Anthony Sagar, Clive Francis, Elizabeth Knight and Shirley Cain | Based on the novel The Burden of Proof by James Barlow |
| Whity | Rainer Werner Fassbinder | West Germany | Drama, western | Günther Kaufmann, Hanna Schygulla, Katrin Schaake, Harry Baer, Ulli Lommel and Ron Randell | |
| Women in Revolt | Paul Morrissey | United States | Comedy, drama | Candy Darling, Jackie Curtis, Holly Woodlawn, Jonathan Kramer, Michael Sklar, Maurice Braddell, Johnny Kemper, Martin Kove and Frank Cavestani | |
