= List of LGBTQ-related films of 1994 =

This is a list of lesbian, gay, bisexual, transgender or queer-related films released in 1994. It contains theatrically released films that deal with important gay, lesbian, bisexual, transgender or queer characters or issues and may have same-sex romance or relationships as a plot device.

== Films ==
Title	Director	Country	Genre	Cast	Notes
The Adventures of Priscilla, Queen of the Desert	Stephan Elliott	Australia	Musical, comedy, drama	Terence Stamp, Daniel Kellie, Hugo Weaving, Guy Pearce, Leighton Picken, Bill Hunter, Sarah Chadwick, Mark Holmes, Julia Cortez and Ken Radley	
Apart From Hugh	Jon Fitzgerald	United States	Drama	David Merwin, Steve Arnold, Jennifer Reid	Screenplay by Jon Fitzgerald
Bar Girls	Marita Giovanni	United States	Drama	Nancy Allison Wolfe, Liza D'Agostino, Camila Griggs, Michael Harris, Justine Slater, Lisa Parker, Pam Raines, Paula Sorge, Cece Tsou, Caitlin Stansbury, Patti Sheehan, Lee Everett, Betsy Burke, Laurie Jones and Chaz Bono (credited as Chastity Bono)	Screenplay by Lauran Hoffman, adapted from her stage play of the same name
Belle al Bar	Alessandro Benvenuti	Italy	Comedy	Alessandro Benvenuti, Eva Robin's	
Color of Night	Richard Rush	United States	Thriller	Bruce Willis, Jane March	
Boys Life: Three Stories of Love, Lust, and Liberation	Robert Lee King, Raoul O'Connell, Brian Sloan	United States	Drama	James Andrews, Mary Beth Aylesworth, Mike Barbour, Steve Bilich, Wendy Brokaw, Bojesse Christopher, Dennis Christopher, Adrian Davey, Kimberly Flynn, Richard Foster, Will Gorgess, Terry Herrington, Nick Kokotakis, Russell Scott Lewis and Matt Nolan	
Coming Out Under Fire	Arthur Dong	United States	Documentary	narrator Salome Jens	Based on Allan Bérubé's book examining the attitudes toward homosexuality in the United States Armed Forces during World War II, it won a Teddy Award and Peabody Award.
Eclipse	Jeremy Podeswa	Canada	Drama	Von Flores, Pascale Montpetit, Manuel Aranguiz, Maria del Mar, Matthew Ferguson, Earl Pastko, Daniel MacIvor	
Ed Wood	Tim Burton	United States	Comedy, drama	Johnny Depp, Martin Landau, Sarah Jessica Parker, Patricia Arquette, Lisa Marie, Jeffrey Jones, Max Casella, Brent Hinkley, Bill Murray, George "The Animal" Steele, Juliet Landau, Ned Bellamy, Mike Starr, Stanley DeSantis, Rance Howard, Vincent D'Onofrio, Korla Pandit, Gregory Walcott and Conrad Brooks	
Fast Trip, Long Drop	Gregg Bordowitz	United States	Documentary		An autobiographical film of a 29-year-old bisexual activist/filmmaker, finding out he is HIV-positive.
Four Weddings and a Funeral	Mike Newell	United Kingdom	Romance, comedy, drama	Hugh Grant, Andie MacDowell, James Fleet, Simon Callow, John Hannah, Kristin Scott Thomas, David Bower, Charlotte Coleman, Timothy Walker, Sara Crowe, Rowan Atkinson, David Haig, Sophie Thompson, Corin Redgrave and Anna Chancellor	
A Friend of Dorothy	Raoul O'Connell	United States	Short, drama	Raoul O'Connell, Ann Russo (credited as Ann Zupa), Kevin McClatchy, Greg Lauren, Steven Brinberg, Thomas Lennon (credited as Tom Lennon), Tom Hickey, Jerry Haggerty, Bianca, Reggie Cabico, Aimee Cummins, Sara Goodman, Matt Kapp, Ross Kennett and Drew Lee	
Go Fish	Rose Troche	United States	Romance, drama	Guinevere Turner, V.S. Brodie, T. Wendy McMillan, Anastasia Sharp, Migdalia Melendez, Scout and Dave Troche	
Heavenly Creatures	Peter Jackson	United Kingdom; Germany; New Zealand	Crime, drama	Melanie Lynskey, Kate Winslet, Sarah Peirse, Diana Kent, Clive Merrison, Simon O'Connor, Jed Brophy, Peter Elliott, Gilbert Goldie and Elizabeth Moody	Based on the Parker-Hulme murder case
I Like It Like That	Darnell Martin	United States	Romance, comedy, drama	Lauren Vélez, Jon Seda, Tomas Melly, Desiree Casado, Isaiah Garcia (credited as Isiah Garcia), Jesse Borrego, Lisa Vidal, Griffin Dunne, Rita Moreno, Vincent Laresca, Elvis Nolasco (credited as E.O. Nolasco), Sammy Melendez, Jose Soto, Gloria Irizarry, Emilio Del Pozo and Jerry Rivera	
I Like You, I Like You Very Much	Hiroyuki Oki	Japan	Drama	Chano, Hisanori Kitakaze, Naoya Matsumae, Kazufumi Nishimoto, Hiroyuki Oki, Kazunori Shibuya, Tomoko Taka and Yoji Tanaka	
Interview with the Vampire	Neil Jordan	United States	Drama, horror	Tom Cruise, Brad Pitt, Christian Slater, Kirsten Dunst, Antonio Banderas, Stephen Rea, Domiziana Giordano, Thandie Newton, George Kelly, Marcel Iureş, Sara Stockbridge and Indra Ové	Screenplay by Anne Rice, based on her novel of the same name
The Last Supper	Cynthia Roberts	Canada	Drama	Daniel MacIvor, Ken McDougall and J.D. Nicholsen	
A Man of No Importance	Suri Krishnamma	Ireland; United Kingdom	Comedy, drama	Albert Finney, Brenda Fricker, Michael Gambon, David Kelly, Tara Fitzgerald, Rufus Sewell, Patrick Malahide, Mick Lally, Anna Manahan, Joe Pilkington, Brendan Conroy, Joan O'Hara, Eileen Reid, Eileen Conroy, Maureen Egan, Jonathan Rhys-Meyers, Enda Oates, Maureen Mc Arthur and Paudge Behan	
Maybe, Maybe Not	Sönke Wortmann	Germany	Comedy	Til Schweiger, Katja Riemann, Joachim Król, Rufus Beck, Armin Rohde, Martina Gedeck, Kai Wiesinger, Monty Arnold, Martin Armknecht and Mike Reichenbach	a.k.a. The Most Desired Man
Oh! My Three Guys	Derek Chiu	Hong Kong	Comedy, drama	Eric Kot, Sean Lau (credited as Ching Wan Lau), Dayo Wong	
Pigalle	Karim Dridi	France	Crime, drama, musical	Véra Briole, Francis Renaud, Raymond Gil, Bobby Pacha, Blanca Li, Philippe Ambrosini, Younesse Boudache, Jean-Michel Fête, Christian Saunier, Christian Auger, Olindo Cavadini and Patrick Chauvel	
Prêt-à-Porter	Robert Altman	United States	Comedy, drama	Marcello Mastroianni, Sophia Loren, Anouk Aimée	Released in the U.S. as Ready to Wear (Prêt-à-Porter)
Priest	Antonia Bird	United Kingdom	Drama	Linus Roache, Tom Wilkinson, Robert Carlyle, Cathy Tyson, Christine Tremarco, Robert Pugh and Lesley Sharp	
Reality Bites	Ben Stiller	United States	Comedy, drama	Winona Ryder, Ethan Hawke, Ben Stiller, Janeane Garofalo, Swoosie Kurtz, Joe Don Baker, John Mahoney, Steve Zahn, Renée Zellweger, Andy Dick, Keith David and Pat Crawford Brown	
Sissy Boy Slap Party	Guy Maddin	Canada	Experimental short		Lost film; recreated by Maddin in 2004 with a new cast.
Sister My Sister	Nancy Meckler	United Kingdom	Drama	Julie Walters, Joely Richardson, Jodhi May, Sophie Thursfield, Amelda Brown, Lucita Pope, Kate Gartside, Aimee Schmidt and Gabriella Schmidt	Screenplay by Wendy Kesselman, based on her stage play My Sister in This House
Straight from the Heart	Dee Mosbacher, Frances Reid	United States	Documentary, short		
Strawberry and Chocolate	Tomás Gutiérrez Alea, Juan Carlos Tabío	Cuba; Mexico; Spain	Comedy, drama	Jorge Perugorría, Vladimir Cruz, Mirta Ibarra, Francisco Gattorno, Joel Angelino, Marilyn Solaya, Andrés Cortina and Antonio Carmona	a.k.a. Fresa y chocolate; screenplay by Senel Paz, based on Paz's short story El Lobo, el bosque y el hombre nuevo (The Wolf, the Forest and the New Man)
The Sum of Us	Geoff Burton, Kevin Dowling	Australia	Comedy, drama	Jack Thompson, Russell Crowe, John Polson, Deborah Kennedy, Joss Moroney, Mitch Mathews, Julie Herbert, Des James, Mick Campbell, Donny Muntz, Jan Adele, Rebekah Elmaloglou, Lola Nixon, Sally Cahill and Bob Baines	Screenplay by David Stevens, based on his stage play of the same name
Super 8½	Bruce La Bruce	Canada; Germany; United States	Drama, adult	Bruce La Bruce, Stacy Friedrich, Mikey Mike, Nicholas Davies, Christeen Martin, Kate Ashley and Scott Thompson	
Threesome	Andrew Fleming	United States	Romance, comedy, drama	Josh Charles, Lara Flynn Boyle, Stephen Baldwin, Robert Arquette, Martha Gehman, Mark Arnold, Michele Matheson and Joanne Baron	
To Die For	Peter Mackenzie Litten	United Kingdom	Romance, drama	Thomas Arklie, Ian Williams, Tony Slattery, Dillie Keane, John Altman, Jean Boht, Caroline Munro and Ian McKellen	
Tout le monde est parfait	Jean-Jacques Jauffret	France	Short, drama	Corine Blue, Olivier Pajot, Denis D'Arcangelo, Jean-Philippe Maran, Georges Pinto, Zidine Boudaoud and Danièle Gain	
Trevor	Peggy Rajski	United States	Short, comedy, drama	Brett Barsky, Judy Kain, John Lizzi, Jonah Rooney, Stephen Tobolowsky, Cory M. Miller (credited as Corey Miller), Allen Dorane, Lindsay Pomerantz, Alicia Anderson and Courtney Dornstein	
Unschuldsengel	Rainer Kaufmann	Germany	Drama, mystery, thriller	Christian Näthe, Jürgen Vogel, Nicolette Krebitz, Richy Müller, Moritz Bleibtreu, Herbert Knaup, Claudia Demarmels, Florian Heiden, Wilfried Dziallas, Pamela Großer, Aram Coen, Werner Eichhorn, Peter Franke, Kolja Hosemann and Jürgen Janza	TV movie
Wasaga	Judith Doyle	Canada	Drama	Louise Lilliefeld, Tracy Wright, Daniel MacIvor	
Wild Reeds	André Téchiné	France	Drama	Élodie Bouchez, Gaël Morel, Stéphane Rideau, Frédéric Gorny, Michèle Moretti, Jacques Nolot, Eric Kreikenmayer, Nathalie Vignes, Michel Ruhl and Fatia Maite	a.k.a. Les Roseaux sauvages
World and Time Enough	Eric Mueller	United States	Comedy, drama	Gregory Giles, Matt Guidry, Kraig Swartz	
