= List of LGBTQ-related films of 1984 =

This is a list of lesbian, gay, bisexual, transgender or queer-related films released in 1984. It contains theatrically released films that deal with important gay, lesbian, bisexual, transgender or queer characters or issues and may have same-sex romance or relationships as a plot device.

== Films ==
Title	Director	Country	Genre	Cast	Notes
Angel	Robert Vincent O'Neill	United States	Action, thriller	Cliff Gorman, Susan Tyrrell, Dick Shawn	
Another Country	Marek Kanievska	United Kingdom	Romance, drama	Rupert Everett, Colin Firth, Cary Elwes, Michael Jenn, Robert Addie, Rupert Wainwright, Tristan Oliver, Piers Flint-Shipman (credited as Frederick Alexander), Adrian Ross Magenty, Geoffrey Bateman, Philip Dupuy, Guy Henry, Jeffry Wickham, John Line, Gideon Boulting, Nicholas Rowe, Anna Massey and Betsy Brantley	Screenplay by Julian Mitchell, based on his stage play of the same name
Before Stonewall	John Scagliotti, Greta Schiller	United States	Documentary	Ann Bannon, Lisa Ben, Gladys Bentley, George Buse, Carroll Davis, Martin Duberman, Allen Ginsberg, Barbara Gittings, Barbara Grier, Mabel Hampton, Harry Hay, Evelyn Hooker, Jim Kepner, Audre Lorde, Bruce Nugent and Craig Rodwell	
The Bostonians	James Ivory	United Kingdom; United States	Drama, romance	Christopher Reeve, Vanessa Redgrave, Jessica Tandy, Madeleine Potter, Nancy Marchand, Wesley Addy, Barbara Bryne, Linda Hunt, Charles McCaughan, Nancy New, John Van Ness Philip and Wallace Shawn	Based on the novel of the same name by Henry James
Bright Eyes	Stuart Marshall	United Kingdom	Documentary	Michael Callen and Stuart Marshall	One of the first films about the AIDS epidemic. Produced for Channel 4.
Dune	David Lynch	United States	Action, adventure, fantasy, sci-fi	Francesca Annis, Leonardo Cimino, Brad Dourif, José Ferrer, Linda Hunt, Freddie Jones, Richard Jordan, Kyle MacLachlan, Virginia Madsen, Silvana Mangano, Everett McGill, Kenneth McMillan, Jack Nance, Sian Phillips, Jürgen Prochnow, Paul Smith, Patrick Stewart, Sting, Angélica Aragón, Dean Stockwell, Max von Sydow, Alicia Roanne Witt, Sean Young, Honorato Magalone, Judd Omen and Molly Wryn	Based on the novel of the same name by Frank Herbert
Horror Vacui	Rosa von Praunheim	West Germany	Drama	Lotti Huber, Joaquin La Habana, Folkert Milster, Friedrich Steinhauer, Günter Thews, Ingrid van Bergen and Tom Vogt (as Thomas Vogt)	
The Hotel New Hampshire	Tony Richardson	Canada; United Kingdom; United States	Comedy, drama	Jodie Foster, Beau Bridges, Rob Lowe, Nastassja Kinski, Wilford Brimley, Paul McCrane, Wallace Shawn, Lisa Banes, Jennifer Dundas, Seth Green, Anita Morris, Amanda Plummer, Matthew Modine, Robert Thomas, Lorena Gale and Joely Richardson	Based on the novel of the same name by John Irving
Improper Conduct	Néstor Almendros, Orlando Jiménez Leal	France	Documentary		a.k.a. Mauvaise Conduite
La Muerte de Mikel	Imanol Uribe	Spain	Drama	Imanol Arias, Monserrat Salvador, Amaia Lasa, Fama (Fernando Telletxea), Martín Adjermián, Alicia Sánchez and Xabier Elorriaga	
A Man Like E.V.A.	Radu Gabrea	West Germany	Biography, drama	Eva Mattes, Lisa Kreuzer, Werner Stocker, Charles Regnier, Charles M. Huber, Carola Regnier, Albert Kitzl, Towje Kleiner, Lothar Borowsky, Maria Mettke, Loek Dikker, Frank Büssing, Heinz Kowalczyk, Sibylle Rauch and Frederike Wilde	
Mass Appeal	Glenn Jordan	United States	Drama, comedy	Jack Lemmon, Željko Ivanek	Based on play of the same name by Bill C. Davis
Mike's Murder	James Bridges	United States	Drama	Debra Winger, Mark Keyloun, Darrell Larson	
Monaco Forever	William A. Levey	United States	Comedy, short	Charles Pitt	
Mother's Meat and Freud's Flesh	Demetrios Estdelacropolis	Canada	Comedy-drama	George Agettees, Pierre Bastien, Christian Dufault, Demetri Estdelacropolis (credited as Demetri Demetrios), Michel Gagnon, Lawrence Joseph, Harry Karagopian, W.A. MacGregor, Marjorie Morton, Claire Nadon, E.J. Sullivan, Michelle Tardif, Rick Trembles and Esther Vargas	
Poppers	José María Castellví II	Spain	Drama	Giannina Facio, Agustín González (credited as Agustín Gonzalez), Conrado San Martín (credited as Conrado San Martin), Alfredo Mayo, Manuel de Blas, Luis Suárez (credited as Luis Suarez), Andrés Mejuto, José Luis de Vilallonga, Miguel Ortiz, Bruna Calderón (credited as Bruna Calderon), Miguel Lobato, Teresa Nieto and Clara González (credited as Clara Gonzalez)	
Secret Places	Zelda Barron	United Kingdom	Drama	Marie Theres Relin, Tara MacGowran, Claudine Auger, Jenny Agutter, Cassie Stuart, Ann-Marie Gwatkin, Pippa Hinchley, Sylvia Coleridge, Klaus Barner, Rosemary Martin, Amanda Grinling, Veronica Clifford, Adam Richardson, Zoe Caryl, Erika Spotswood, Bill Ward, Rosamund Greenwood, Maurice O'Connell, Margaret Lacey, Marissa Dunlop, Mike Heywood, Andrew Byatt, Tony London, Georgia Slowe, John Henson, Robert Kelly, Paul Ambrose, Francisco Morales, Stewart Guidotti, Mark Lewis, Jessica Walter, Sian Dunlop, Alan Berry, Lala Lloyd and John Segal	Based on a novel by Janice Elliott
The Sprinter	Christoph Böll	West Germany	Drama	Wieland Samolak, Gerhard Olschewski, Renate Muri, Dieter Eppler, Miriam Spoerri, Wichard von Roell and Jürgen Mikol	
The Times of Harvey Milk	Rob Epstein	United States	Documentary	Harvey Fierstein (narrator), Anne Kronenberg, Tom Ammiano, Sally Gearhart, Allan Baird, Harvey Milk, Dan White, George Moscone, Dianne Feinstein, Jimmy Carter and Bill Kraus	
La triche	Yannick Bellon	France	Thriller	Victor Lanoux, Anny Duperey, Valérie Mairesse, Xavier Deluc, Michel Galabru, Roland Blanche, Michèle Simonnet, Patrick Raynal, Gérard Hérold, Guy Tréjan, Jacky Laurent, Guillaume Boisseau, Jean Boissery, Franck Capillery and Patrick Catalifo	
What Have I Done to Deserve This?	Pedro Almodóvar	Spain	Comedy, drama	Carmen Maura, Ángel de Andrés López, Juan Martínez, Miguel Ángel Herranz, Chus Lampreave, Verónica Forqué, Kiti Manver, Sonia Hohmann, Gonzalo Suárez, Amparo Soler Leal, Katia Loritz, Luis Hostalot, Javier Gurruchaga, Cecilia Roth, Pedro Almodóvar, Tinín Almodóvar and Carlitos	
Wiener Brut	Hans Fädler	Austria	Drama	Herbert Adamec, Georg Biro, Gerhard Bornitsch, Franz Brendinger, Carola Coca Cola, Marie Therese Escribano, Kurt Freimüller, Erna Frühgeburth, Clemens Fürtler, Georg Heinke, Michi Jürs, Rudi Katzer, Kosilo, Kurt Kröpfl and Hansi Lang	
