= List of LGBTQ-related films of 1982 =

This is a list of lesbian, gay, bisexual, transgender or queer-related films released in 1982. It contains theatrically released films that deal with important gay, lesbian, bisexual, transgender or queer characters or issues and may have same-sex romance or relationships as a plot device.

== Films ==
Title	Director	Country	Genre	Cast	Notes
Angel	Giorgos Katakouzinos	Greece	Drama	Michalis Maniatis, Dionysis Xanthos	
Another Way	Károly Makk, János Xantus	Hungary	History, drama	Jadwiga Jankowska-Cieślak, Ildikó Bánsági, Grażyna Szapołowska, Judit Hernádi, Jozef Kroner, Gyula Szabó and Péter Andorai	a.k.a. Egymásra nézve; co-written by Erzsébet Galgóczi, based on her semi-autobiographic novella Another Love (Törvényen belül)
Casta Diva	Eric De Kuyper	Netherlands	Fantasy	Emile Poppe, Jack Post, Paul Ruven and Paul Verstraten	
La colmena	Mario Camus	Spain	Drama	Victoria Abril, Francisco Algora, Rafael Alonso, Ana Belén, José Bódalo, Mary Carrillo, Camilo José Cela, Queta Claver, Luis Escobar, Fiorella Faltoyano, Agustín González, Emilio Gutiérrez Caba, Rafael Hernández, Charo López, José Luis López Vázquez, Antonio Mingote, Mario Pardo, Encarna Paso, María Luisa Ponte, Elvira Quintillá, Francisco Rabal, Antonio Resines, José Sazatornil, Elena María Tejeiro, Ricardo Tundidor, Concha Velasco, Manuel Zarzo, Imanol Arias, Luis Barbero, Luis Ciges, Marta Fernández Muro and Miguel Rellán	a.k.a. The Beehive or The Hive; based on the novel of the same name by Camilo José Cela
Come Back to the Five and Dime, Jimmy Dean, Jimmy Dean	Robert Altman	United States	Comedy, drama	Sandy Dennis, Cher, Karen Black, Sudie Bond, Marta Heflin, Kathy Bates, Mark Patton, Caroline Aaron, Ruth Miller, Gena Ramsel, Ann Risley and Dianne Turley Travis	Screenplay by Ed Graczyk, based on his stage play of the same name
Le crime d'amour	Guy Gilles	France	Drama	Macha Méril, Richard Berry, Jacques Penot, Manuel Gélin, Piéral, Jean-Marie Proslier, Rosette, Sonia Saviange, Jean Wiener, Isabelle Lepin, Jean Dasté, Romain Tagli, Pascal Greggory (as Pascal Gréggory), Claude Brosset and Anne Caudry	
Deathtrap	Sidney Lumet	United States	Comedy, crime, mystery, thriller	Michael Caine, Christopher Reeve, Dyan Cannon, Irene Worth, Henry Jones and Joe Silver	Co-written by Ira Levin, based on his stage play of the same name
Drifting	Amos Guttman	Israel	Short, drama	Jonathan Sagall, Ami Traub, Ben Levin, Dita Arel, Boaz Torjemann and Mark Hasmann	a.k.a. Nagu'a or Afflicted
Forbidden Zone	Richard Elfman	United States	Comedy	Susan Tyrrell	
Forty Deuce	Paul Morrissey	United States	Drama	Orson Bean, Kevin Bacon, Mark Keyloun, Tommy Citera, Esai Morales, Harris Laskaway (credited as Harris Laskawy), John Ford Noonan (credited as John Noonan), Meade Roberts, Yukio Yamamoto, Rudy DeBellis, Steve Steinlauf and Susan Blond	
Labyrinth of Passion	Pedro Almodóvar	Spain	Comedy	Cecilia Roth, Imanol Arias, Helga Liné, Marta Fernández Muro, Antonio Banderas, Fernando Vivanco, Ofelia Angélica, Luis Ciges, Angel Alcazar, Concha Grégori, Agustín Almodóvar and Cristina S. Pascual	
Liquid Sky	Slava Tsukerman	United States	Comedy, sci-fi	Anne Carlisle, Paula E. Sheppard, Susan Doukas, Otto von Wernherr, Bob Brady, Elaine C. Grove, Stanley Knap, Jack Adalist, Lloyd Ziff, Harry Lum, Roy MacArthur, Sara Carlisle, Nina V. Kerova, Alan Preston and Christine Hatfull	
Luc or His Share of Things	Michel Audy	Canada	Drama	Pierre Normandin, Éric Boulay, Alain Thiffault	a.k.a. Luc ou la part des choses
Making Love	Arthur Hiller	United States	Drama	Michael Ontkean, Harry Hamlin, Kate Jackson, Wendy Hiller, Arthur Hill and Nancy Olson	
Partners	James Burrows	United States	Comedy	Ryan O'Neal, John Hurt, Kenneth McMillan, Robyn Douglass, Jay Robinson, Denise Galik, Joseph R. Sicari, Michael McGuire, Rick Jason, James Remar, Jennifer Ashley, Darrell Larson, Tony March, Seamon Glass and Steven Reisch	
Personal Best	Robert Towne	United States	Drama	Mariel Hemingway, Scott Glenn, Patrice Donnelly and Kenny Moore	
Querelle	Rainer Werner Fassbinder	West Germany; France	Drama	Brad Davis, Franco Nero, Jeanne Moreau, Laurent Malet, Hanno Pöschl, Günther Kaufmann, Burkhard Driest, Roger Fritz, Dieter Schidor, Natja Brunckhorst, Werner Asam, Axel Bauer, Neil Bell, Robert van Ackeren, Wolf Gremm and Frank Ripploh	Based on the novel Querelle of Brest by Jean Genet
Señora de nadie	María Luisa Bemberg	Argentina	Drama	Luisina Brando, Rodolfo Ranni, Julio Chávez, Gabriela Acher, Susú Pecoraro, China Zorrilla, Berugo Carambula, Gonzalo Palmes, Damián Urquino, María Ibarreta (as Mariángeles), Guillermo Rico, Villanueva Cosse, João Ádeles, Lidia Catalano and Pino Dangelo	a.k.a. Nobody's Wife
Track Two (Enough Is Enough)	Harry Sutherland	Canada	Documentary	Margaret Atwood, John Sewell, June Callwood, Laurier LaPierre, George Hislop, Chris Bearchell, Brent Hawkes, Gerald Hannon, Ken Popert	
The Trout	Joseph Losey	France	Drama	Isabelle Huppert, Jean-Pierre Cassel, Jeanne Moreau, Daniel Olbrychski, Jacques Spiesser, Isao Yamagata, Jean-Paul Roussillon, Roland Bertin, Lisette Malidor, Craig Stevens, Ruggero Raimondi, Alexis Smith, Lucas Belvaux, Pierre Forget, Ippo Fujikawa, Yûko Kada, Anne François, Pascal Morand and Frédérique Briel	Co-written by Roger Vailland, based on his novel
Tootsie	Sydney Pollack	United States	Comedy	Dustin Hoffman, Jessica Lange, Teri Garr, Dabney Coleman, Bill Murray, Charles Durning, Sydney Pollack, George Gaynes, Geena Davis, Doris Belack, Lynne Thigpen, Estelle Getty, Willy Switkes and Tobin Bell	
Victor/Victoria	Blake Edwards	United Kingdom; United States	Romance, comedy, musical	Julie Andrews, James Garner, Robert Preston, Lesley Ann Warren, Alex Karras, John Rhys-Davies, Graham Stark, Peter Arne, Malcolm Jamieson, Sherloque Tanney, Ina Skriver, Michael Robbins, Maria Charles, Glen Murphy, Geoffrey Beevers, Norman Alden and Jay Benedict	Remake of the 1933 film Victor and Victoria
Weggehen um anzukommen	Alexandra von Grote	West Germany	Drama	Gabriele Osburg	a.k.a. Depart to Arrive
The World According to Garp	George Roy Hill	United States	Romance, comedy, drama	Robin Williams, James "J.B." McCall, Mary Beth Hurt, Glenn Close, John Lithgow, Hume Cronyn, Jessica Tandy, Swoosie Kurtz, Peter Michael Goetz, Mark Soper, Warren Berlinger, Brandon Maggart, Amanda Plummer, Jenny Wright and Brenda Currin	Based on the novel of the same name by John Irving
