= List of LGBTQ-related films of 1986 =

This is a list of lesbian, gay, bisexual, transgender or queer-related films released in 1986. It contains theatrically released films that deal with important gay, lesbian, bisexual, transgender or queer characters or issues and may have same-sex romance or relationships as a plot device.

== Films ==
Title	Director	Country	Genre	Cast	Notes
Anne Trister	Léa Pool	Canada	Drama	Albane Guilhe, Louise Marleau, Lucie Laurier, Guy Thauvette, Hugues Quester, Nüvit Özdogru, Kim Yaroshevskaya, Carl Boileau, Elizabeth Briand, Pierre Plante, Sarah-Jeanne Salvy, Michael Schneider, Gilbert Sicotte, Rosalie Thauvette and Rena B. Wasserman	
Another Love Story	Américo Ortiz de Zárate	Argentina	Romance, drama	Arturo Bonín, Mario Pasik, Carlos Muñoz, María José Demare, Daniel Galarza, Nelly Prono, Héctor Bidonde, Alicia Aller, Roxana Berco, Susana Cart, Alejandro Vanelli, Patricio Gago, Óscar Ortiz, Alejandro Triguero and José María Carballo	
As Is	Michael Lindsay-Hogg	United States	Drama	Colleen Dewhurst, Robert Carradine, Jonathan Hadary, Doug Annear, Joanna Miles, Alan Scarfe, Julie Whitfield (credited as Julie Ganton), Samantha Langevin, Reg Drager, Gerald Lenton, Tonya Lee Williams, Jeremy Ratchford, Chris Owens, Andrew Lewarne and Tedd Dillon	TV movie
Between Two Women	Jon Avnet	United States	Drama	Farrah Fawcett, Colleen Dewhurst, Michael Nouri, Bridgette Andersen, Danny Corkill, Steven Hill, Terry O'Quinn, Kenneth Danziger and Carmen Argenziano	
Caravaggio	Derek Jarman	United Kingdom	Historical, drama	Noam Almaz, Dawn Archibald, Sean Bean, Jack Birkett, Sadie Corre, Una Brandon-Jones, Imogen Claire, Robbie Coltrane, Garry Cooper, Lol Coxhill, Nigel Davenport, Vernon Dobtcheff, Terry Downes, Dexter Fletcher, Michael Gough, Jonathan Hyde, Spencer Leigh, Emile Nicolaou, Gene October, Cindy Oswin, John Rogan, Zohra Sehgal, Tilda Swinton, Lucien Taylor, Nigel Terry and Simon Fisher Turner	Fictionalized re-telling of the life of the Baroque painter of the same name
Chinese Characters	Richard Fung	United States	Short	Lloyd Wong, Lim Cheung, Paul Cheung	
The Decline of the American Empire	Denys Arcand	Canada	Drama	Rémy Girard, Dominique Michel, Dorothée Berryman, Louise Portal, Pierre Curzi, Yves Jacques, Geneviève Rioux, Daniel Brière, Gabriel Arcand and Ariane Frédérique	
Dress Gray	Glenn Jordan	United States	Crime Drama	Alec Baldwin, Lloyd Bridges, Hal Holbrook	
The Flavor of Corn	Gianni Da Campo	Italy	Coming-of-age, romance, drama	Lorenzo Lena, Marco Mestriner, Alba Mottura, Egidio Termine, Mattia Pinoli, Paolo Garlato, Elena Barbalich, Elisabetta Barbini and Marina Vlady	
In a Glass Cage	Agustí Villaronga	Spain	Drama	Günter Meisner, David Sust, Marisa Paredes, Gisèle Echevarría, Imma Colomer, Ricardo Carcelero and Alberto Manzano	a.k.a. Tras el cristal; inspired by the history of Gilles de Rais
Mala Noche	Gus Van Sant	United States	Drama	Tim Streeter, Doug Cooeyate, Ray Monge, Nyla McCarthy, Don Chambers and Walt Curtis	a.k.a. Bad Night; based on the autobiographical novel Mala Noche: And Other "Illegal" Adventures by Walt Curtis
Mona Lisa	Neil Jordan	United Kingdom	Crime, drama	Bob Hoskins, Cathy Tyson, Michael Caine	
Moscow Does Not Believe in Queers	John Greyson	Canada	Short, documentary		About the 10 days the director spent in Moscow, during the 12th World Festival of Youth and Students in 1985
My Two Loves	Noel Black	United States	Romance, drama	Mariette Hartley, Lynn Redgrave, Barry Newman	TV movie
Parting Glances	Bill Sherwood	United States	Drama	Richard Ganoung, John Bolger, Steve Buscemi, Adam Nathan, Kathy Kinney, Patrick Tull, Yolande Bavan, Andre Morgan, Richard Wall, Jim Selfe, Kristin Moneagle, John Siemens, Bob Koherr (credited as Bob Kohrherr), Theodore Ganger and Nada	
Project A-ko	Katsuhiko Nishijima	Japan	Animation, sci-fi	Miki Itō, Michie Tomizawa, Emi Shinohara, Asami Mukaidono	
The Rose King	Werner Schroeter	West Germany; Portugal; France; Netherlands	Drama, musical	Magdalena Montezuma, Mostefa Djadjam, Antonio Orlando, Karina Fallenstein, Sintra and Montijo	a.k.a. Der Rosenkönig
Second Serve	Anthony Page	United States	Biographical Drama	Vanessa Redgrave, Martin Balsam, Richard Venture	TV movie
Tenue de soirée	Bertrand Blier	France	Comedy, crime, drama	Michel Blanc, Gérard Depardieu, Miou-Miou, Michel Creton, Jean-Pierre Marielle, Jean-Yves Berteloot, Bruno Cremer, Caroline Sihol, Mylène Demongeot, Jean-François Stevenin, Dominique Besnehard and Bernard Farcy	a.k.a. Ménage
The Truth About Alex	Paul Shapiro	United States	Drama	Scott Baio, Peter Spence	
Vera	Sérgio Toledo	Brazil	Drama	Ana Beatriz Nogueira, Norma Blum, Raul Cortez, Carlos Kroeber	Based on the life of Anderson Bigode Herzer
A Virus Knows No Morals	Rosa von Praunheim	West Germany	Comedy, drama, sci-fi	Dieter Dicken, Maria Hasenäcker, Christian Kesten, Eva-Maria Kurz (credited as Eva Kurz), Rosa von Praunheim, Ina Blum, Thilo von Trotha, Holger Klotzbach, Arnulf Rating, Günter Thews, Craig Russell, Hella von Sinnen, Gisela Dreyer (credited as Gisela Dryer), Nadja Reichardt (credited as Nadja Patricia Reichardt) and Ellen Reichhardt (credited as Ellen F. Reichhardt)	a.k.a. Ein Virus kennt keine Moral
Welcome Home, Bobby	Herbert Wise	United States	Drama	Timothy Williams, Tony Lo Bianco, Adam Baldwin	TV movie
Working Girls	Lizzie Borden	United States	Drama	Louise Smith, Ellen McElduff	
