= List of LGBTQ-related films of 1961 =

This is a list of lesbian, gay, bisexual, transgender or queer-related films released in 1961. It contains theatrically released films that deal with important gay, lesbian, bisexual, transgender or queer characters or issues and may have same-sex romance or relationships as a plot device.

== Films ==
Title	Director	Country	Genre	Cast	Notes
Accattone	Pier Paolo Pasolini	Italy	Drama	Franco Citti, Franca Pasut, Silvana Corsini, Paola Guidi and Adriana Asti	
The Children's Hour	William Wyler	United States	Drama	Shirley MacLaine, Audrey Hepburn, James Garner, Miriam Hopkins, Fay Bainter and Karen Balkin	The film is based on Lillian Hellman's play The Children's Hour, with school teachers falsely accused of having lesbian relationship; one of them realizes that she is in love with the other.
La Fille aux yeux d'or	Jean-Gabriel Albicocco	France; Italy	Drama	Marie Laforêt, Paul Guers, Françoise Prévost, Françoise Dorléac and Jacques Verlier	AKA The Girl with the Golden Eyes
A Taste of Honey	Tony Richardson	United Kingdom	Drama	Dora Bryan, Robert Stephens, Rita Tushingham, Murray Melvin and Paul Danquah	Co-written by Shelagh Delaney, based on her play of the same name
Victim	Basil Dearden	United Kingdom	Crime, drama	Dirk Bogarde, Sylvia Syms, Dennis Price, Nigel Stock, Peter McEnery, Donald Churchill, Anthony Nicholls, Hilton Edwards, Norman Bird, Derren Nesbitt and Alan MacNaughtan	First English language film to use the word "homosexual"
