= List of LGBTQ-related films of 1992 =

This is a list of lesbian, gay, bisexual, transgender or queer-related films released in 1992. It contains theatrically released films that deal with important gay, lesbian, bisexual, transgender or queer characters or issues and may have same-sex romance or relationships as a plot device.

== Films ==
Title	Director	Country	Genre	Cast	Notes
Basic Instinct	Paul Verhoeven	United States; France	Drama, mystery, thriller	Michael Douglas, Sharon Stone, George Dzundza, Jeanne Tripplehorn, Denis Arndt, Leilani Sarelle, Bruce A. Young, Chelcie Ross, Dorothy Malone, Wayne Knight, Daniel von Bargen, Stephen Tobolowsky, Benjamin Mouton, Jack McGee, Bill Cable and James Rebhorn	
Being at Home with Claude	Jean Beaudin	Canada	Drama	Roy Dupuis, Jacques Godin, Jean-François Pichette, Gaston Lepage, Hugo Dubé, Johanne-Marie Tremblay, Nathalie Mallette and Lothaire Bluteau	Based on a play by René-Daniel Dubois
Claire of the Moon	Nicole Conn	United States	Romantic, drama	Trisha Todd, Karen Trumbo, Faith McDevitt, Craig Damen (credited as Damon Craig), Caren Graham, Sheila Dickenson (credited as Sheila Dickinson), Patricia Blem, Melissa Mitchell, Gathering Marbet, Sherilyn Lawson, Doug Rouhier and Misty Cooper	
The Crying Game	Neil Jordan	United Kingdom; Japan	Romance, drama, thriller	Stephen Rea, Miranda Richardson, Forest Whitaker, Jaye Davidson, Adrian Dunbar, Tony Slattery, Jim Broadbent, Birdy Sweeney and Ralph Brown	
Doing Time on Maple Drive	Ken Olin	United States	Drama	James Sikking, Bibi Besch, William McNamara	TV movie
Evil Toons	Fred Olen Ray	United States	Comedy, horror	David Carradine, Monique Gabrielle, Madison (credited as Madison Stone)	
The Fairy Who Didn't Want to Be a Fairy Anymore	Laurie Lynd	Canada	Short, comedy, drama	Daniel MacIvor, Holly Cole, Micah Barnes, John Turner and Michael Kennard	
Flaming Ears	Ursula Puerrer, A. Hans Scheirl, Dietmar Schipek	Austria	Fantasy, sci-fi	Susana Helmayr, Ursula Puerrer (as Ursula Pürrer), A. Hans Scheirl (as Angela Hans Scheirl), Margarete Neumann, Gabriele Szekatsch, Anthony Escott, Luise Kubelka, Dietmar Schipek, Heiderose Hildebrand, Sabine Perthold, Norbert Gmeindl, Bella Gmeindl, Billa Gmeindl, Karin Melton and Monika Bernold	a.k.a. Rote Ohren fetzen durch Asche
For a Lost Soldier	Roeland Kerbosch	Netherlands	Romance, war, drama	Maarten Smit, Jeroen Krabbé, Andrew Kelley, Freark Smink, Elsje de Wijn, Derk-Jan Kroon, Wiendelt Hooijer, Iris Misset, Gineke de Jager, Tatum Dagelet, Marie-José Kouwenhoven, Valerie Valentine, William Sutton, Andrew Butling and Andrew Cassani	a.k.a. Voor een Verloren Soldaat; based on Rudi van Dantzig's autobiographical novel of the same name
Forbidden Love: The Unashamed Stories of Lesbian Lives	Lynne Fernie, Aerlyn Weissman	Canada	Documentary		In 1994, it won the GLAAD Media Award for Outstanding Film (Documentary).
Gayniggers from Outer Space	Morten Lindberg	Denmark	Short, sci-fi	Coco P. Dalbert, Sammy Saloman, Gerald F. Hail, Gbatokai Dakinah, Konrad Fields, Johnny Conny and Tony Thomas	
I Am My Own Woman	Rosa von Praunheim	Germany	Documentary, drama	Charlotte von Mahlsdorf, Jens Taschner, Ichgola Androgyn and Robert Dietl	a.k.a. Ich bin meine eigene Frau; based on Charlotte von Mahlsdorf's biography of the same name
A Kind of Family	Andrew Koster	Canada	Documentary	Glen Murray and Mike his adopted son	It received a Genie Award nomination for Best Short Documentary at the 13th Genie Awards.
The Living End	Gregg Araki	United States	Comedy, drama	Mike Dytri, Craig Gilmore, Mark Finch, Mary Woronov, Johanna Went, Darcy Marta, Scot Goetz, Bretton Vail, Nicole Dillenberg, Stephen Holman, Magie Song, Peter Lanigan, Jon Gerrans, Jack Kofman, Chris Mabli, Michael Now, Michael Haynes, Peter Grame, Jordan Beswick, Paul Bartel, Craig Lee and Torie Chickering	
My Wife's Lover	Kevin Chu	Hong Kong		Chik King Man, Maria Tung Ling, Vincent Lam	
Okoge	Takehiro Nakajima	Japan	Drama	Misa Shimizu, Takehiro Murata, Takeo Nakahara, Atsushi Fukazawa, Takatoshi Takeda, Masayuki Shionoya, Kyozo Nagatsuka, Mitsuko Oka, Michiyo Yokoyama, Noriko Sengoku, Toshie Negishi, Charles Garfield, Yoshiko Kuga, Dump Matsumoto, Toshinori Omi, Casey Takamine, Guts Ishimatsu, Eriko Watanabe, Michio Kita, Asako Mori, Yoko Ogawa and Shô Ryûzanji	
Orlando	Sally Potter	United Kingdom	Romantic, drama	Tilda Swinton, Quentin Crisp, Jimmy Somerville, John Wood, John Bott, Elaine Banham, Anna Farnworth, Sara Mair-Thomas, Anna Healy, Dudley Sutton, Simon Russell Beale, Matthew Sim, Charlotte Valandrey, Toby Stephens, Oleg Pogodin, Heathcote Williams, Thom Hoffman, Sarah Crowden and Billy Zane	Based on the novel Orlando: A Biography by Virginia Woolf
Peter's Friends	Kenneth Branagh	United Kingdom	Comedy, drama	Stephen Fry, Kenneth Branagh, Hugh Laurie, Imelda Staunton, Emma Thompson, Alphonsia Emmanuel, Rita Rudner, Tony Slattery and Phyllida Law	
Poison Ivy	Katt Shea	United States	Drama, thriller	Sara Gilbert, Drew Barrymore, Tom Skerritt, Cheryl Ladd, Alan Stock, Jeanne Sakata, E.J. Moore, J.B. Quon, Leonardo DiCaprio (credited as Leonardo Di Caprio), Michael Goldner, Charley Hayward, Time Winters, Billy Kane, Tony Ervolina and Mary Gordon Murray	
Prelude to a Kiss	Norman René	United States	Romantic fantasy	Alec Baldwin, Meg Ryan	Screenplay by Craig Lucas, based on his play of the same name
Rock Hudson's Home Movies	Mark Rappaport	United States	Documentary		Clips from over 30 of Hudson's films that could be interpreted as gay entendres
Savage Nights	Cyril Collard	France; Italy	Drama	Cyril Collard, Romane Bohringer, Clémentine Célarié, Maria Schneider, Carlos López, Corine Blue, Claude Winter and René-Marc Bini	a.k.a. Les Nuits Fauves, based on Collard's semi-autobiographical novel of the same name
The Silent Thrush (Shisheng huamei)	Cheng Sheng-fu	Taiwan	Drama	Yu-Shan, Yi-Chan Lu, Ying-Chen Chang, Yuan Chia-Pei	Based on the 1990 novel by Ling Yan.
Swoon	Tom Kalin	United States	Crime, drama	Daniel Schlachet, Craig Chester, Ron Vawter, Michael Kirby, Michael Stumm, Valda Z. Drabla, Natalie Stanford and Glenn Backes	An account of the Leopold and Loeb murder case
Timothy Findley: Anatomy of a Writer	Terence Macartney-Filgate	Canada	Documentary	Timothy Findley, William Whitehead, William Hutt, Martha Henry, Susan Coyne	Blend of documentary content profiling Findley and Whitehead with acted scenes from his then in-progress theatrical play The Stillborn Lover
Walking After Midnight	Atıf Yılmaz	Turkey	Romance, drama	Meral Oğuz, Lale Mansur, Yaman Okay, Selçuk Özer, Sema Çeyrekbaşı, Memduh Ün, Nilüfer Aydan and Deniz Türkali	
The Yo-Yo Gang	G. B. Jones	Canada	Comedy, short	Caroline Azar	
