= List of LGBTQ-related films of 1983 =

This is a list of lesbian, gay, bisexual, transgender or queer-related films released in 1983. It contains theatrically released films that deal with important gay, lesbian, bisexual, transgender or queer characters or issues and may have same-sex romance or relationships as a plot device.

== Films ==
Title	Director	Country	Genre	Cast	Notes
A 20th Century Chocolate Cake	Lois Siegel	Canada	Docufiction, comedy	Greg Van Riel, Charles Fisch Jr.	
Abuse	Arthur J. Bressan Jr.	United States	Drama	Raphael Sbarge, Richard Ryder	
Appearances Are Deceptive	Jaime Humberto Hermosillo	Mexico	Drama	Isela Vega, Gonzalo Vega, Manuel Ojeda and Margarita Isabel	a.k.a. Las apariencias engañan
Born in Flames	Lizzie Borden	United States	Drama	Honey, Adele Bertei, Jean Satterfield, Florynce Kennedy (credited as "Flo Kennedy"), Becky Johnston, Pat Murphy, Kathryn Bigelow, Hillary Hurst, Sheila McLaughlin, Marty Pottenger, Bell Chevigny, Joel Kovel, Ron Vawter, John Coplans, John Rudolph, Warner Schreiner, Valerie Smaldone, Hal Miller, Bill Tatum and Mark Boone Jr.	
City of Lost Souls	Rosa von Praunheim	West Germany	Comedy	Jayne County (credited as Wayne County), Manfred Finger, Judith Flex, Helga Goetze, Gerhard Helle, Rolf Holzhütter, Lotti Huber, Katja Kunik, Joaquin La Habana, Burghard Mauer, Gary Miller, Lorraine Muthke, Tara O'Hara, Rainer-Götz Otto and Wolfgang Schumacher	
Dark Habits	Pedro Almodóvar	Spain	Comedy, drama	Cristina Sánchez Pascual, Julieta Serrano, Chus Lampreave, Marisa Paredes, Carmen Maura, Lina Canalejas, Mary Carrillo, Berta Riaza, Manuel Zarzo and Cecilia Roth	a.k.a. Entre tinieblas
David Roche Talks to You About Love	Jeremy Podeswa	Canada	Short drama	David Roche	
The Dresser	Peter Yates	United Kingdom	Drama	Albert Finney, Tom Courtenay, Edward Fox, Zena Walker, Eileen Atkins, Michael Gough, Cathryn Harrison, Betty Marsden, Sheila Reid, Lockwood West, Donald Eccles, Llewellyn Rees, Guy Manning, Anne Mannion, Kevin Stoney, Ann Way, John Sharp, Kathy Staff and Roger Avon	Screenplay by Ronald Harwood, based on his stage play of the same name; homosexual subtext
An Englishman Abroad	Alan Bennett	United Kingdom	Drama	Alan Bates, Coral Browne, Charles Gray	TV movie
Entre Nous	Diane Kurys	France	Drama	Miou-Miou, Isabelle Huppert, Guy Marchand, Jean-Pierre Bacri, Robin Renucci, Patrick Bauchau, Jacques Alric, Jacqueline Doyen, Saga Blanchard, Guillaume Le Guellec, Christine Pascal, Corinne Anxionnaz, Jacques Blal, Bernard Cazassus and Gérard Chambre	a.k.a. Between us; Original title Coup de foudre (i.e. At First Sight)
The Fourth Man	Paul Verhoeven	Netherlands	Thriller	Jeroen Krabbé, Renée Soutendijk, Thom Hoffman, Dolf de Vries, Geert de Jong, Hans Veerman, Hero Muller, Caroline de Beus, Reinout Bussemaker, Erik J. Meijer, Ursul de Geer, Filip Bolluyt, Hedda Lornie, Paul Nygaard and Guus van der Made	Based on the novel of the same name by Gerard Reve
The Hunger	Tony Scott	United Kingdom; United States	Romance, drama, horror	Catherine Deneuve, David Bowie, Susan Sarandon, Cliff De Young, Beth Ehlers, Dan Hedaya, Suzanne Bertish, James Aubrey, John Stephen Hill, Ann Magnuson, Shane Rimmer, Bessie Love, Willem Dafoe, John Pankow and Bauhaus	Loosely adapted from the novel of the same name by Whitley Strieber
İhtiras Fırtınası	Halit Refiğ	Turkey	Romance, drama	Gülsen Bubikoglu, Cihan Ünal, Zuhal Olcay (credited as Zühal Olcay), Raik Alniaçik, Haluk Kurtoglu, Diler Saraç, Renan Fosforoglu, Necip Tekçe, Ihsan Gedik, Mary March, Damla Ira, Muhtesem Durukan, Zeki Alpan, Eren Erenci and Cevdet Balikçi	
Lianna	John Sayles	United States	Drama	Linda Griffiths, Jane Hallaren, Jon DeVries, Jo Henderson, Jessica MacDonald, Jesse Solomon, John Sayles, Stephen Mendillo, Betsy Julia Robinson, Nancy Mette, Maggie Renzi, Madelyn Coleman, Robyn Reeves, Chris Elliott and Marta Renzi	
Making of a Male Model	Irving J. Moore	United States	Drama, romance	Joan Collins, Jon-Erik Hexum	TV movie
Merry Christmas, Mr. Lawrence	Nagisa Oshima	Japan; United Kingdom	War, drama	David Bowie, Tom Conti, Ryuichi Sakamoto, Takeshi Kitano, Jack Thompson, Johnny Okura, Alistair Browning, James Malcolm, Chris Broun, Yuya Uchida, Ryunosuke Kaneda, Takashi Naitō, Tamio Ishikura, Rokko Toura, Kan Mikami and Hideo Murota	
El pico	Eloy de la Iglesia	Spain	Drama	José Luis Manzano, Javier García, José Manuel Cervino, Luis Iriondo, Enrique San Francisco, Lali Espinet, Ovidi Montllor, Queta Ariel, Marta Molins and Pedro Nieva Parola	
Self Defense	Paul Donovan	Canada	Action, thriller	Tom Nardini, Brenda Bazinet, Darel Haeny, Terry-David Després, Jack Blum, Keith Knight, Jeff Pustil	a.k.a. Siege
Silkwood	Mike Nichols	United States	Drama, thriller	Meryl Streep, Kurt Russell, Cher, Craig T. Nelson, Fred Ward, Diana Scarwid, Ron Silver, Josef Sommer, Charles Hallahan, Sudie Bond, Henderson Forsythe, Bruce McGill, David Strathairn, M. Emmet Walsh, Ray Baker, Will Patton, E. Katherine Kerr and J.C. Quinn	Inspired by the life of Karen Silkwood
Sleepaway Camp	Robert Hiltzik	United States	Thriller	Mike Kellin, Katherine Kamhi	a.k.a. Nightmare Vacation
Streamers	Robert Altman	United States	Drama	Matthew Modine, Michael Wright, Mitchell Lichtenstein	Screenplay by David Rabe, adapted from his play of the same name
Dressed in Blue	Antonio Giménez-Rico	Spain	Documentary	Lorenzo Arana Orellano, Rene Amor Fernandez, Jose Antonio Sanchez Sanchez, Francisco los Cobos Avila, Juan Muñoz Santiago, Jose Ruiz Orejon Casado, Arturo González, Javier Burgos, Carlos Picasa and Pedro Basanta	a.k.a. Vestida de azul, follows six Spanish trans women.
Without a Trace	Stanley R. Jaffe	United States	Drama	Kate Nelligan, Judd Hirsch, David Dukes	Partly based on the disappearnace of Etan Patz
The Wounded Man	Patrice Chéreau	France	Crime, drama	Jean-Hugues Anglade, Vittorio Mezzogiorno, Roland Bertin, Lisa Kreuzer, Claude Berri, Armin Mueller-Stahl, Annick Alane, Sophie Edmond, Hammou Graïa, Gérard Desarthe, Denis Lavant, Maria Verdi, Suzanne Chavance, Roland Chalosse, Eddy Roos and Charly Chemouny	
