= List of LGBTQ-related films of 1962 =

This is a list of lesbian, gay, bisexual, transgender or queer-related films released in 1962. It contains theatrically released films that deal with important gay, lesbian, bisexual, transgender or queer characters or issues and may have same-sex romance or relationships as a plot device.

== Films ==
Title	Director	Country	Genre	Cast	Notes
Advise & Consent	Otto Preminger	United States	Drama	Henry Fonda, Charles Laughton, Don Murray, Walter Pidgeon, Peter Lawford, Gene Tierney, Franchot Tone, Lew Ayres, Burgess Meredith, Eddie Hodges, Paul Ford and George Grizzard	Based on the novel of the same name by Allen Drury
Billy Budd	Peter Ustinov	United Kingdom	Drama, adventure	Terence Stamp, Robert Ryan, Peter Ustinov, Melvyn Douglas, Paul Rogers, John Neville, David McCallum, Ronald Lewis, Lee Montague, Thomas Heathcote, Ray McAnally, Robert Brown, John Meillon, Cyril Luckham and Niall MacGinnis	Based on the novel of the same name by Herman Melville
Black Lizard	Umetsugu Inoue	Japan	Comedy, crime, fantasy	Machiko Kyō, Minoru Ōki, Junko Kano, Hiroshi Kawaguchi, Masao Mishima, Sachiko Meguro	Based on the novel of the same name by Rampo Edogawa
Closed Door	Pedro Escudero	Argentina	Drama	María Aurelia Bisutti, Carlos Brown, Elsa Dorian, Mario Horna, Miguel Irarte, Inda Ledesma, Duilio Marzio	Based on the stage play No Exit by Jean-Paul Sartre
Diferente	Luis María Delgado	Spain	Fantasy, musical, drama	Alfredo Alaria, Manuel Monroy, Sandra Le Brocq, Manuel Barrio and Julia Gutiérrez Caba	
Hussar Ballad	Eldar Ryazanov	Soviet Union	Musical, comedy	Larisa Golubkina, Yury Yakovlev, Igor Ilyinsky, Nikolai Kryuchkov	Loosely based on the life of Nadezhda Durova
The L-Shaped Room	Bryan Forbes	United Kingdom	Drama	Leslie Caron, Tom Bell, Brock Peters, Cicely Courtneidge, Bernard Lee, Patricia Phoenix, Emlyn Williams, Avis Bunnage, Gerry Duggan, Mark Eden, Antony Booth, Harry Locke, Gerald Sim and Nanette Newman	Has a gay black guitar player
Lawrence of Arabia	David Lean	United Kingdom	Adventure, biography, drama	Peter O'Toole, Alec Guinness, Anthony Quinn, Jack Hawkins, José Ferrer, Anthony Quayle, Claude Rains, Arthur Kennedy and Omar Sharif	Based on the life of T. E. Lawrence
Ver Elini İstanbul	Aydın Arokan	Turkey	Drama	Çolpan İlhan, Leyla Sayar, Tanju Gürsu, Mualla Kavur, Ahmet Tarik Tekçe and Öztürk Serengil	
Walk on the Wild Side	Edward Dmytryk	United States	Drama	Laurence Harvey, Capucine, Jane Fonda, Anne Baxter and Barbara Stanwyck	Based on the novel A Walk on the Wild Side by Nelson Algren
