= List of LGBTQ-related films of 1987 =

This is a list of lesbian, gay, bisexual, transgender or queer-related films released in 1987. It contains theatrically released films that deal with important gay, lesbian, bisexual, transgender or queer characters or issues and may have same-sex romance or relationships as a plot device.

== Films ==
Title	Director	Country	Genre	Cast	Notes
Baba-It	Jonathan Sagall	Israel	Short	Ronna Cohen, Serjio Elmand, Amikam Levi, Judi Litani, Gita Luka, Julian Maurier, Ruth Sagalle and Shmuel Vilozni	a.k.a. At Home
Beyond Therapy	Robert Altman	United States	Comedy	Julie Hagerty, Jeff Goldblum, Glenda Jackson, Tom Conti, Christopher Guest, Geneviève Page, Cris Campion, Sandrine Dumas, Bertrand Bonvoisin, Nicole Evans, Louis-Marie Taillefer, Matthew Leonard-Lesniak and Laure Killing	Based on the play of the same name by Christopher Durang
Burglar	Hugh Wilson	Canada; United States	Comedy	Whoopi Goldberg, Bobcat Goldthwait	Based on the novel The Burglar in the Closet by Lawrence Block
Damned If You Don't	Su Friedrich	United States	Short	Peggy Healey, Makea MacDonald and Ela Troyano	
Friends Forever	Stefan Henszelman	Denmark	Drama	Rita Angela, Carsten Morch, Lars Kylmann Jacobsen, Trine Torp Hansen, Thomas Sigsgaard, Christine Skou, Claus Bender Mortensen, Morten Stig Christensen, Mika Heilmann, Thomas Elholm, Lilla Nielsen, Rasmus Bay Barlby, Christian Kamienski, Claus Steenstrup Nielsen and Christian Adam Garnov	a.k.a. Venner for altid
Funny Boy	Christian Le Hémonet	France	Comedy, drama	Gérard Lecaillon, Valérie Mairesse, Anaïs Jeanneret, Sacha Briquet, Jean-Pierre Kalfon, Gérard Rinaldi, Katherine Erhardy (credited as Catherine Erhardy), Gaëlle Legrand, Annouck Dupont, Brenda Kane, Agnès Blanchot, Anouchka Roïtman, Jacques Herlin, Macha Béranger and Jacques Bouanich	
The Gold Rimmed Glasses	Giuliano Montaldo	Italy; France; Yugoslavia	Drama	Philippe Noiret, Rupert Everett, Valeria Golino, Nicola Farron, Stefania Sandrelli, Rade Markovic, Roberto Herlitzka, Luca Zingaretti and Ivana Despotovic	a.k.a. Gli occhiali d'oro
The Heart Exposed	Jean-Yves Laforce	Canada	Drama	Michel Poirier, Gilles Renaud	a.k.a. Le Cœur découvert
I've Heard the Mermaids Singing	Patricia Rozema	Canada	Comedy, drama	Sheila McCarthy, Paule Baillargeon, Ann-Marie MacDonald, Richard Monette, John Evans and Brenda Kamino	
The Last of England	Derek Jarman	United Kingdom West Germany	Drama	Tilda Swinton, Spencer Leigh, 'Spring' Mark Adley, Gerrard McArthur, Jonny Phillips, Gay Gaynor, Matthew Hawkins and Nigel Terry	The winner of the Teddy Award for best feature film at the 38th Berlin International Film Festival.
Law of Desire	Pedro Almodóvar	Spain	Romance, comedy, drama	Eusebio Poncela, Carmen Maura, Antonio Banderas, Miguel Molina, Manuela Velasco, Bibi Andersen, father and son Fernando Guillén and Fernando Guillén Cuervo, Helga Liné, Nacho Martínez and Germán Cobos	The winner of the Teddy Award for best feature film at the 37th Berlin International Film Festival.
Less than Zero	Marek Kanievska	United States	Drama	Andrew McCarthy, Jami Gertz, Robert Downey Jr.	
Maurice	James Ivory	United Kingdom	Romance, drama	James Wilby, Hugh Grant, Rupert Graves, Denholm Elliott, Simon Callow, Billie Whitelaw, Barry Foster, Judy Parfitt, Phoebe Nicholls, Ben Kingsley, Patrick Godfrey, Mark Tandy, Kitty Aldridge, Helena Michell, Catherine Rabett and Peter Eyre	Based on the novel of the same name by E. M. Forster
Mannequin	Michael Gottlieb	United States	Romance, comedy	Andrew McCarthy, Kim Cattrall, Estelle Getty, James Spader, G. W. Bailey, Meshach Taylor, Carole Davis, Steve Vinovich and Christopher Maher	
Mga Anak ni Facifica Falayfay	Romy S. Villaflor	Philippines	Comedy	Dolphy, Roderick Paulate, Zsa Zsa Padilla	
Night Angels	Wilson Barros	Brazil	Drama	Zezé Motta, Antônio Fagundes, Marco Nanini, Chiquinho Brandão, Aida Leiner, Cláudio Mamberti, Aldo Bueno, Ana Ramalho, José Rubens Chachá, Letícia Imbassahy, Guilherme Leme, Be Valério, Marília Pêra, Sérgio Mamberti and Arrigo Barnabé	a.k.a. Anjos de Noite
Night Zoo	Jean-Claude Lanzon	Canada	Crime, drama	Gilles Maheu, Lunne Adams, Roger Lebel	a.k.a. Un Zoo La Nuit
No Way Out	Roger Donaldson	United States	Thriller	Kevin Costner, Gene Hackman, Sean Young	Based on the novel The Big Clock by Kenneth Fearing
Prick Up Your Ears	Stephen Frears	United Kingdom	Comedy, drama	Gary Oldman, Alfred Molina, Vanessa Redgrave, Frances Barber, Janet Dale, Julie Walters, Bert Parnaby, Margaret Tyzack, Lindsay Duncan, Wallace Shawn and Joan Sanderson	Based on a biography of Joe Orton by John Lahr
She Must Be Seeing Things	Sheila McLaughlin	United States	Drama	Lois Weaver, Sheila Dabney, Kyle deCamp, John Erdman, Ed Bowes and Peggy Shaw	
Surrender	Jerry Belson	United States	Comedy	Sally Field, Michael Caine and Steve Guttenberg	
Taxi nach Kairo	Frank Ripploh	Germany	Comedy	Frank Ripploh, Christine Neubauer, Udo Schenk	
Three Bewildered People in the Night	Gregg Araki	United States	Drama	Darcy Marta, John Lacques and Mark Howell	First feature film by New Queer Cinema director Gregg Araki. Winner of the 1987 Los Angeles Film Critics Association Independent-Experimental Award.
Too Outrageous!	Richard Benner	Canada	Comedy	Craig Russell, Hollis McLaren	Sequel to the 1977 film Outrageous!
Tough Guys Don't Dance	Norman Mailer	United States	Drama	Ryan O'Neal, Isabella Rossellini, Debra Sandlund	
Waiting for the Moon	Jill Godmilow	United States	Drama	Linda Hunt, Linda Bassett, Bernadette Lafont	
Withnail and I	Bruce Robinson	United Kingdom	Drama	Richard E. Grant, Paul McGann, Richard Griffiths, Ralph Brown, Michael Elphick, Eddie Tagoe, Daragh O'Malley, Michael Wardle, Una Brandon-Jones and Noel Johnson	
