= List of LGBTQ-related films of 1968 =

This is a list of lesbian, gay, bisexual, transgender or queer-related films released in 1968. It contains theatrically released films that deal with important gay, lesbian, bisexual, transgender or queer characters or issues and may have same-sex romance or relationships as a plot device.

== Films ==
Title	Director	Country	Genre	Cast	Notes
The Anniversary	Roy Ward Baker	United Kingdom	Comedy	Bette Davis, James Cossins, Jack Hedley, Christian Roberts, Sheila Hancock and Elaine Taylor	Based on the same name by Bill MacIlwraith
Black Lizard	Kinji Fukasaku	Japan	Comedy, crime, fantasy	Akihiro Miwa, Isao Kimura, Kikko Matsuoko, and Jun Usami	Based on the novel of the same name by Rampo Edogawa
The Boston Strangler	Richard Fleischer	United States	Neo-noir	Tony Curtis, Henry Fonda, George Kennedy	Loosely based on the true story of the Boston Strangler and the book by Gerold Frank
Daughters of Lesbos	Peter Woodcock	United States	Drama	Geri Miller, Linda Boyce, Jo Sweet, Jackie Richards, Sue Akers, Dick White and Uta Erickson	
The Detective	Gordon Douglas	United States	Crime, drama	Frank Sinatra, Lee Remick, Jacqueline Bisset, Ralph Meeker, Jack Klugman, Horace McMahon, Lloyd Bochner, William Windom, Tony Musante, Al Freeman, Jr., Robert Duvall and Pat Henry	Based on the novel of the same name by Roderick Thorp
Fanny Hill Meets the Red Baron	Barry Mahon	United States	Drama, exploitation	Sue Evans, Cherie Winter, Kristen Steen	
Flesh	Paul Morrissey	United States	Drama	Joe Dallesandro, Geraldine Smith, Maurice Braddell, Louis Waldon, Geri Miller, Candy Darling, Jackie Curtis, Patti D'Arbanville and Barry Brown	
Gates to Paradise	Andrzej Wajda	United Kingdom; Yugoslavia	Drama	Lionel Stander, Ferdy Mayne, Mathieu Carrière, Pauline Challoner, John Fordyce, Jenny Agutter, Dragomir Felba, Denis Gilmore, Gojko Kovačević, Ljabomir Radavic, Kynaston Reeves and Janez Vrhovec	
if....	Lindsay Anderson	United Kingdom	Drama	Malcolm McDowell, Richard Warwick	
The Killing of Sister George	Robert Aldrich	United States	Drama	Beryl Reid, Susannah York, Coral Browne, Ronald Fraser, Patricia Medina, Byron Webster, Cyril Delevanti, Brendan Dillon and Hugh Paddick	Based on the play of the same name by Frank Marcus
Les Biches	Claude Chabrol	France; Italy	Drama	Jean-Louis Trintignant, Jacqueline Sassard, Stéphane Audran, Nane Germon, Serge Bento, Henri Frances, Henri Attal and Dominique Zardi	
The Young Wolves	Marcel Carné	France; Italy	Drama	Christian Hay, Haydée Politoff, Yves Beneyton, Maurice Garrel, Gamil Ratib, Stéphane Bouy, Rolande Kalis, Bernard Dhéran, Elizabeth Teissier and Serge Leeman	aka Les jeunes loups
The Lion in Winter	Anthony Harvey	United States	History, drama	Peter O'Toole, Katharine Hepburn, Anthony Hopkins, John Castle, Nigel Terry, Timothy Dalton, Jane Merrow, Nigel Stock, Kenneth Ives and O. Z. Whitehead	Screenplay by James Goldman, based on his stage play of the same name
Lonesome Cowboys	Andy Warhol	United States	Western	Joe Dallesandro, Julian Burroughs, Eric Emerson, Tom Hompertz, Taylor Mead, Viva, Louis Waldon and Francis Francine	
The Queen	Frank Simon	United States	Documentary	Flawless Sabrina, Crystal LaBeija	
Rachel, Rachel	Paul Newman	United States	Drama, romance	Joanne Woodward, James Olson, Kate Harrington, Estelle Parsons, Donald Moffat, Terry Kiser, Frank Corsaro, Bernard Barrow and Geraldine Fitzgerald	Based on the novel A Jest of God by Margaret Laurence
The Sergeant	John Flynn	United States	Drama	Rod Steiger, John Phillip Law, Ludmila Mikaël, Frank Latimore and Elliott Sullivan	
She Mob	Diana Paschal	United States	Drama	Marni Castle, Monique Duval, Adam Clyde, Twig, Eve Laurie, Ann Adams, Joy Dale, Bill Bags, Peaches Chatman, Robert Beam and Raymond Smith	
Teorema	Pier Paolo Pasolini	Italy	Drama, mystery	Terence Stamp, Laura Betti, Silvana Mangano, Massimo Girotti, Anne Wiazemsky, Andrés José Cruz Soublette and Ninetto Davoli	
Therese and Isabelle	Radley Metzger	France; United States; Netherlands	Drama, romance	Essy Persson, Anna Gaël, Barbara Laage and Anne Vernon	based on the novel Thérèse et Isabelle by Violette Leduc
