= List of LGBTQ-related films of 1964 =

This is a list of lesbian, gay, bisexual, transgender or queer-related films released in 1964. It contains theatrically released films that deal with important gay, lesbian, bisexual, transgender or queer characters or issues and may have same-sex romance or relationships as a plot device.

== Films ==
Title	Director	Country	Genre	Cast	Notes
491	Vilgot Sjöman	Sweden	Drama	Lars Lind, Leif Nymark, Stig Törnblom, Lars Hansson, Sven Algotsson, Torleif Cederstrand, Bo Andersson, Lena Nyman, Frank Sundström and Åke Grönberg	Features a male homosexual rape scene
The Leather Boys	Sidney J. Furie	United Kingdom	Drama	Rita Tushingham, Colin Campbell, Dudley Sutton, Gladys Henson, Avice Landone, Lockwood West, Betty Marsden, Martin Matthews and Johnny Briggs	
Les amitiés particulières	Jean Delannoy	France	Drama	Francis Lacombrade, Didier Haudepin, François Leccia, Dominique Maurin, Louis Seigner, Michel Bouquet and Lucien Nat	a.k.a. This Special Friendship
Love Meetings	Pier Paolo Pasolini	Italy	Documentary	Pier Paolo Pasolini (Interviewer), Alberto Moravia, Oriana Fallaci and Giuseppe Ungaretti	a.k.a. debates about love
Manji	Yasuzo Masumura	Japan	Drama	Ayako Wakao, Kyōko Kishida and Eiji Funakoshi	Based on the novel Quicksand by Jun'ichirō Tanizaki
