= List of LGBTQ-related films of 1966 =

This is a list of lesbian, gay, bisexual, transgender or queer-related films released in 1966. It contains theatrically released films that deal with important gay, lesbian, bisexual, transgender or queer characters or issues and may have same-sex romance or relationships as a plot device.

== Films ==
Title	Director	Country	Genre	Cast	Notes
The Nun	Jacques Rivette	France	Drama	Anna Karina, Liselotte Pulver, Micheline Presle, Francine Bergé, Francisco Rabal, Yori Bertin, Catherine Diamant, Christiane Lenier and Wolfgang Reichmann	a.k.a. La Religieuse; based on the novel of the same name by Denis Diderot
Young Törless	Volker Schlöndorff	West Germany; France	Drama, thriller	Mathieu Carrière, Marian Seidowsky, Bernd Tischer, Fred Dietz, Lotte Ledl, Jean Launay and Barbara Steele	Adapted from the autobiographical novel The Confusions of Young Törless by Robert Musil
