= List of LGBTQ-related films of 1988 =

This is a list of lesbian, gay, bisexual, transgender or queer-related films released in 1988. It contains theatrically released films that deal with important gay, lesbian, bisexual, transgender or queer characters or issues and may have same-sex romance or relationships as a plot device.

== Films ==
Title	Director	Country	Genre	Cast	Notes
'68	Steven Kovacs	United States	Drama	Eric Larson, Robert Locke, Sándor Técsy, Anna Dukasz, Miran Kwun, Terra Vandergaw, Shony Alex Braun, Donna Pecora, Elizabeth De Charay, Jan Nemec, Rusdi Lane, Nike Doukas, Neil Young, Frank X. Mur, Joel Parker and Paul Pedrol	
Apartment Zero	Martin Donovan	United Kingdom; Argentina	Drama, thriller	Hart Bochner, Colin Firth, Dora Bryan, Liz Smith, Fabrizio Bentivoglio, James Telfer, Mirella D'Angelo, Juan Vitali, Cipe Lincovsky, Francesca d'Aloja, Miguel Ligero, Elvia Andreoli, Marikena Monti, Luis Romero, Max Berliner, Debora Bianco, Federico D'Elía, Raúl Florido, Claudio Ciacci, Gabriel Posniak, Darwin Sanchez, Daniel Queirolo, Miguel Ángel Porro, Ezequiel Donovan, Eduardo Peralta Ramos, John Kamps, Göran Johansson, Lisanne Cole, Germán Palacios, Horacio Erman and Inés Estévez	
Curse of the Queerwolf	Mark Pirro	United States	Comedy, horror	Michael Palazzolo, Kent Butler, Taylor Whitney, Cynthia Brownell, Darwyn Carson, Jim Bruce, Sergio Bandera, Mark Pirro, Rodney Trappe, John McCafferty, Pat Hunter, Timothy Ralston, Susan Cherones, Conrad Brooks, Forrest J Ackerman, Alfie Pearl, Hugh O. Fields, Mike Margy, Cheryl Butler, Natalia Gvozdic and Don Martin	
Daniel endormi	Michel Béna	France	Short, drama	François Chaix, David Léotard, Christine Paolini, Georges Montillier, Pascal Bonitzer, Xavier Beauvois and Sandrine Chatrefou	
The Everlasting Secret Family	Michael Thornhill	Australia	Drama	Mark Lee, Drew Norman, Dennis Miller, Arthur Dignam, Ken Keen, Marcus Cornelius, Heather Mitchell, Michael Winchester, Louis Nowra, Dominic Barry, Paul Davies, Allan Penney, Victor Ramon and Michael Kozuki	
The Fruit Machine	Philip Saville	United Kingdom	Drama	Emile Charles, Tony Forsyth, Robert Stephens, Robbie Coltrane, Clare Higgins, Bruce Payne, Carsten Norgaard, Kim Christie, Louis Emerick, Julie Graham and Forbes Collins	a.k.a. Wonderland
Hide and Go Shriek	Skip Schoolnik	United States	Slasher	Bunky Jones, Brittian Frye, George Thomas	
Liberace: Behind the Music	David Greene	Canada; United States	Drama, musical	Victor Garber, Saul Rubinek, Michael Dolan, Maureen Stapleton, Shawn Levy, Michael Wilkes, Macha Grenon, George Touliatos, Joan Heney, Andrew Nichols, Paul Hipp, Frances Hyland, Stephen Watts and Rochelle Bruneau	
Macho Dancer	Lino Brocka	Philippines	Drama	Daniel Fernando, Allan Paule, William Lorenzo, Jaclyn Jose, Princess Punzalan, Timothy Diwa, Angelo Miguel, Johnny Vicar, Lucita Soriano, Joel Lamangan, Bobby Sano, Charlie Catalla, Anthony Taylor, Tony Mabesa and Ronald Mendoza	
Once More	Paul Vecchiali	France	Drama	Jean-Louis Rolland, Florence Giorgetti, Pascale Rocard, Nicolas Silberg, Patrick Raynal, Séverine Vincent, Albert Dupontel, Michel Gautier, Dora Doll and Catherine Becker	a.k.a. Encore
Pissoir	John Greyson	Canada	Drama	Paul Bettis, Pauline Carey, Lance Eng, Olivia Rojas	a.k.a. Urinal
Quest for Love	Helena Noguiera	South Africa	Drama	Janna Cilliers, Sandra Prinsloo, Wayne Bowman	
Romance	Sergio Bianchi	Brazil	Drama	José Rubens Chachá, Hugo Della Santa, Emílio Di Biasi, Ruth Escobar, Isa Kopelman, Cláudio Mamberti, Sérgio Mamberti, Elke Maravilha, Cristina Mutarelli, Imara Reis, Rodrigo Santiago, Beatriz Segall, Maria Sílvia and Maria Alice Vergueiro	
Salome's Last Dance	Ken Russell	United States; United Kingdom	Comedy, drama	Glenda Jackson, Stratford Johns, Nickolas Grace, Douglas Hodge, Imogen Millais-Scott, Denis Lill, Russell Lee Nash, Ken Russell, David Doyle, Warren Saire, Kenny Ireland, Michael Van Wijk, Paul Clayton, Imogen Claire and Tim Potter	
Sleepaway Camp II: Unhappy Campers	Michael A. Simpson	United States	Slasher	Pamela Springsteen, Renée Estevez	
Straight for the Heart	Léa Pool	Canada; Switzerland	War, drama	Matthias Habich, Johanne-Marie Tremblay, Michel Voïta, Jean-François Pichette, Kim Yaroshevskaya, Jacqueline Bertrand, France Castel, Pierre Gobeil, Victor Désy, Mimi D'Estée, Louise Caron, Louise Marleau, Marilyn Gardner, Albert Millaire and Jean Gascon	a.k.a. À corps perdu, Based on the novel Kurwenal by Yves Navarre
Summer Vacation 1999	Shusuke Kaneko	Japan	Romance, drama, fantasy, mystery	Eri Miyajima, Tomoko Ōtakara, Miyuki Nakano and Eri Fukatsu	Based on the shōjo manga Thomas no Shinzō by Moto Hagio
Torch Song Trilogy	Paul Bogart	United States	Romance, comedy, drama	Harvey Fierstein, Anne Bancroft, Matthew Broderick, Brian Kerwin, Karen Young, Eddie Castrodad, Ken Page, Charles Pierce and Axel Vera	Screenplay by Fierstein, based on his stage play of the same name
Virgin Machine	Monika Treut	West Germany	Drama	Ina Blum, Marcelo Uriona, Gad Klein, Peter Kern, Hans-Christoph Blumenberg, Dominique Gaspar, Susie Bright, Shelly Mars, Fritz Mikesch, Wolfgang Raach, George Lannan, Erica Marcus, Rhonda Jarvis, Carla Wood Saivre and Fakir Musafar	a.k.a. Die Jungfrauen Maschine
We Think the World of You	Colin Gregg	United Kingdom	Drama	Alan Bates, Gary Oldman, Liz Smith, Max Wall, Frances Barber and Barbara New	Based on the novel of the same name by J. R. Ackerley
