= List of LGBTQ-related films of 2009 =

This is a list of lesbian, gay, bisexual, transgender or queer-related films released in 2009. It contains theatrically released films that deal with important gay, lesbian, bisexual, transgender or queer characters or issues and may have same-sex romance or relationships as a plot device.

== Films ==
Title	Director	Country	Genre	Cast	Notes
All You Need Is Love – Meine Schwiegertochter ist ein Mann	Edzard Onneken	Germany	Comedy, drama	Saskia Vester, Jürgen Tonkel, Andreas Helgi Schmid, Jenny Elvers, Manuel Witting, Franziska Traub, Johannes Herrschmann	
An Englishman in New York	Richard Laxton	United Kingdom	Drama	John Hurt, Denis O'Hare, Jonathan Tucker, Swoosie Kurtz, Cynthia Nixon	Based on the years that writer Quentin Crisp spent in New York City
And Then Came Lola	Ellen Seidler, Megan Siler	United States	Comedy, drama, romance	Ashleigh Sumner, Jill Bennett, Cathy DeBuono, Jessica Graham, Angelyna Martinez, Candy Tolentino and Linda Ignazi	
The Armoire	Jamie Travis	Canada	Short drama	William Cuddy, Ricardo Hoyos, Penelope Corrin	
Berdella	Paul South, William Taft	United States	Horror	Seth Correa, Steve Williams, Marc Saleme, Vito Spino and Elmer Parker	Based on the crimes of serial killer Robert Berdella
Beyond Gay: The Politics of Pride	Bob Christie	Canada	Documentary	Interviewees; Gilbert Baker, Sahran Abeysundara (Director of Equal Ground Sri Lanka), Tomasz Baczkowski (President, Warsaw Equality Parade), Dean Nelson (Director, Vancouver Pride Society), Libby Davies, Fatima Amarshi (executive director, Pride Toronto), Scott Long - Human Rights Watch, Rev. Brent Hawkes, Gareth Henry - J-FLAG Jamaica, Franco Reinado - President, Gay & Lesbian Travel Assoc of Brazil, Nikolai Alekseev and Cleve Jones	Follows Vancouver Pride Society president Ken Coolen at various international Pride events
The Big Gay Musical	Casper Andreas, Fred M. Caruso	United States	Musical	Lena Hall, Daniel Robinson, Joey Dudding, Jeff Metzler and Michael Schiffman	
Black Dynamite	Scott Sanders	United States	Action, blaxploitation, comedy	Michael Jai White, Tommy Davidson, Salli Richardson	
Boy	Auraeus Solito	Philippines	Drama	Aeious Asin, Aries Pena	
Brotherhood	Nicolo Donato	Denmark	Drama	Thure Lindhardt, David Dencik, Nicolas Bro	
The Brotherhood V	David DeCoteau	United States	Horror	Maria Aceves, Preston Davis	
Brüno	Larry Charles	United States	Comedy	Sacha Baron Cohen, Harrison Ford, Ron Paul	
The Butch Factor	Christopher Hines	United States	Documentary		
Cheila	Eduardo Barberena	Venezuela	Drama	Endry Cardeño, José Manuel Suárez, Violeta Alemán and Aura Rivas	
Chloe	Atom Egoyan	United States; Canada; France	Drama, thriller	Julianne Moore, Amanda Seyfried, Liam Neeson	Remake of the 2003 French film Nathalie...
The Consul of Sodom	Sigfrid Monleón	Spain	Drama	Jordi Mollà, Bimba Bosé, Àlex Brendemühl, Josep Linuesa, Isaac de los Reyes, Isabelle Stoffel and Marc Martínez	a.k.a. El cónsul de Sodoma
Cracks	Jordan Scott	United Kingdom; Ireland; Spain; France; Switzerland	Drama, romance, thriller	Eva Green, Juno Temple, María Valverde, Imogen Poots, Sinéad Cusack	
Çürüğüm, Askerim, Reddediyorum	Aydın Öztek	Turkey	Short Documentary	Interviewees; Pınar Selek (Sociologist), Lambdaistanbul, Perihan Mağden (Author) and Mehmet Tarhan (Author)	a.k.a. My caries, soldier, I refuse
David's Birthday	Marco Filiberti	Italy	Drama	Alessandro Gassmann, Massimo Poggio, Maria de Medeiros, Michela Cescon	
Dance Flick	Damien Dante Wayans	United States	Musical, comedy	Shoshana Bush, Damon Wayans Jr., Essence Atkins, Affion Crockett, Shawn Wayans, Amy Sedaris, David Alan Grier, Chelsea Makela, Chris Elliott	
Dare	Adam Salky	United States	Drama	Emmy Rossum, Zach Gilford, Ashley Springer, Ana Gasteyer, Rooney Mara, Sandra Bernhard, Alan Cumming, Cady Huffman	Based on Salky's short film of the same name released in 2005
The Disappearance of Alice Creed	J Blakeson	United Kingdom	Neo-noir, thriller	Gemma Arterton, Martin Compston, Eddie Marsan	
Dorian Gray	Oliver Parker	United Kingdom	Drama	Ben Barnes, Colin Firth, Rebecca Hall, Ben Chaplin, Emilia Fox, Rachel Hurd-Wood	Based on the novel The Picture of Dorian Gray by Oscar Wilde
Drool	Nancy Kissam	United States	Comedy	Laura Harring, Jill Marie Jones, Oded Fehr	
Duas Mulheres	João Mário Grilo	Portugal	Drama	Beatriz Batarda, Débora Monteiro, Virgilio Castelo	
Eating Out: All You Can Eat	Glenn Gaylord	United States	Romance, drama, comedy	Rebekah Kochan, Chris Salvatore, Mink Stole, Leslie Jordan	
Edie & Thea: A Very Long Engagement	Susan Muska, Gréta Olafsdóttir	United States	Documentary	Edith Windsor, Thea Spyer	
El niño pez	Lucía Puenzo	Argentina; France; Spain	Drama, romance, thriller	Inés Efron, Mariela Vitale, Ailín Salas, Pep Munné, Diego Velázquez, Carlos Bardem	a.k.a. The Fish Child; loosely adapted from Puenzo's novel of the same name
Eloïse's Lover	Jesús Garay	Spain	Drama, romance, thriller	Diana Gómez, Ariadna Cabrol	a.k.a. Eloïse
Eyes Wide Open	Haim Tabakman	Israel; Germany; France	Drama	Ran Danker, Zohar Strauss	a.k.a. Einaym Pkuhot
Fig Trees	John Greyson	Canada	Documentary	follows South African AIDS activist Zackie Achmat and Canadian AIDS activist Tim McCaskell as they fight for access to treatment for HIV/AIDS	it won the Teddy Award for Best Documentary
From Beginning to End	Aluizio Abranches	Brazil	Drama	Rafael Cardoso, João Gabriel Vasconcellos, Júlia Lemmertz, Fabio Assunção, Jean Pierre Noher	a.k.a. Do Começo ao Fim
Fruit Fly	H.P. Mendoza	United States	Musical, drama	L. A. Renigen, Ivan de Guzman and Mike Curtis	
Hannah Free	Wendy Jo Carlton	United States	Drama	Sharon Gless, Maureen Gallagher, Kelli Strickland, Ann Hagemann, Taylor Miller	Written and co-produced by Claudia Allen, based on her play of the same name
House of Boys	Jean-Claude Schlim	Germany; Luxembourg	Drama, musical, romance	Layke Anderson, Benn Northover, Udo Kier	
I Killed My Mother	Xavier Dolan	Canada	Drama	Xavier Dolan, Anne Dorval, Suzanne Clément, François Arnaud, Niels Schneider	a.k.a. J'ai tué ma mère
I Love You Phillip Morris	Glenn Ficarra, John Requa	United States	Comedy, drama	Ewan McGregor, Jim Carrey, Rodrigo Santoro, Leslie Mann, Antoni Corone, Brennan Brown, Michael Showers, Marc Macaulay, Annie Golden	
I Saw the Sun	Mahsun Kırmızıgül	Turkey	Drama	Mahsun Kırmızıgül, Cemal Toktaş, Yıldız Kültür, Sarp Apak, Buğra Gülsoy, Ali Sürmeli, Altan Erkekli, Erol Günaydın, Demet Evgar, Cezmi Baskın, Şerif Sezer, Itır Esen	
In My Life	Olivia Lamasan	Philippines	Drama	Vilma Santos, John Lloyd Cruz, Luis Manzano, Vice Ganda, Nikki Valdez, Dimples Romana, Rafael Rosell, Tirso Cruz III, Paw Diaz	
Je te mangerais	Sophie Laloy	France	Drama, music	Judith Davis, Isild Le Besco, Édith Scob, Johan Libéreau, Marc Chapiteau, Fabienne Babe, Alain Beigel, Denis Ménochet	a.k.a. You Will Be Mine
Jolly Fellows	Felix Mikhailov	Russia	Comedy, drama	Ville Haapasalo, Danila Kozlovsky	
The Joneses	Derrick Borte	United States	Comedy, drama	Demi Moore, David Duchovny, Amber Heard, Ben Hollingsworth, Gary Cole, Glenne Headly, Lauren Hutton, Chris Williams, Christine Evangelista	
Lesbian Vampire Killers	Phil Claydon	United Kingdom	Action, Comedy, Horror	James Corden, Mathew Horne, Paul McGann, Emer Kenny, Lucy Gaskell	
Life Blood	Ron Carlson	United States	Horror	Sophie Monk, Anya Lahiri, Scout Taylor-Compton, Electra Avellan, Patrick Renna, Charles Napier, Angela Lindvall, Danny Woodburn	
Little Ashes	Paul Morrison	United Kingdom; Spain	Drama	Robert Pattinson, Javier Beltrán, Matthew McNulty, Marina Gatell	
The Little White Cloud That Cried	Guy Maddin	Canada; Germany	Experimental short	Breanna Rose Taylor, Marcia Ferreira, Eric Wood, Lexi Tronic, Teresa Braun, Zsa Zsa LaBitche, Sex Party Marty	
Lucky Bastard	Everett Lewis	United States	Drama	Patrick Tatten, Dale Dymkoski, Johnny Kostrey and Timothy Cole	
Make the Yuletide Gay	Rob Williams	United States	Comedy	Keith Jordan, Adamo Ruggiero, Hallee Hirsh, Kelly Keaton, Derek Long, Alison Arngrim, Ian Buchanan, Gates McFadden	
Mark	Mike Hoolboom	Canada	Documentary	Mark Karbusicky, Mirha-Soleil Ross, Kristyn Dunnion	
The Mouth of the Wolf	Pietro Marcello	Italy	Documentary, drama	Mary Monaco and Vincenzo Motta	a.k.a. La bocca del lupo
The New Tenants	Joachim Back	Denmark; United States	Short, drama	Vincent D'Onofrio, Kevin Corrigan, Liane Balaban, Jamie Harrold, David Rakoff and Helen Hanft	21 minutes long and won the 2009 Oscar for Best Live Action Short.
Out in the Silence	Dean Hamer, Joe Wilson	United States	Documentary	Residents of Oil City, Pennsylvania; C.J. Bills, Diane Granley, Linda Henderson, Roxanne Hitchcock, Reverend Mark Micklos and Kathy Springer	
Outrage	Kirby Dick	United States	Documentary	Subjects; Ed Koch, Ken Mehlman and Larry Craig Interviews; (openly gay politicians) Tammy Baldwin, Barney Frank, David Catania, Jim Kolbe, James McGreevey (others) Wayne Barrett, Elizabeth Birch, Kirk Fordham, Patrick Guerriero, Dan Gurley, Jim Hormel, Larry Kramer, Tony Kushner, Rodger McFarlane, Kevin Naff, Michael Rogers, Hilary Rosen, Michelangelo Signorile, Andrew Sullivan and Rich Tafel	
Oy Vey! My Son Is Gay!!	Evgeny Afineevsky	United States	Comedy	Lainie Kazan, Saul Rubinek, Vincent Pastore, John Lloyd Young, Jai Rodriguez, Bruce Vilanch, Carmen Electra, Fred Swink	
Permanent Residence	Scud	Hong Kong	Drama	Sean Li, Osman Hung, Jackie Chow Tak Bong, Lau Yu Hong, Eva Lo	Yong jiu ju liu
The Pit and the Pendulum	David DeCoteau	United States	Horror, Erotic	Lorielle New, Stephen Hansen, Bart Voitila, Danielle Demski, Amy Paffrath, Tom Sandoval, Greg Sestero, Michael King, Jason-Shane Scott, Andrew Bowen, Jason Stuart	
Pornography: A Thriller	David Kittredge	United States	Suspense	Matthew Montgomery, Pete Scherer, Jared Grey, Walter Delmar, Dylan Vox	
Prince of Tears	Yonfan	Hong Kong; Taiwan	Drama	Fan Zhiwei, Océane Zhu, Joseph Chang, Terri Kwan, Kenneth Tsang	a.k.a. Lei wangzi
Purple Sea	Donatella Maiorca	Italy	Drama, romance	Valeria Solarino, Isabella Ragonese, Ennio Fantastichini, Giselda Volodi, Maria Grazia Cucinotta, Marco Foschi, Lucrezia Lante della Rovere, Corrado Fortuna	a.k.a. Viola di mare; based on the non-fiction novel Minchia di re by Giacomo Pilati
Raging Sun, Raging Sky	Julián Hernández	Mexico	Drama	Jorge Becerra, Javier Oliván, Guillermo Villegas, Giovanna Zacarías	a.k.a. Rabioso sol, rabioso cielo; winner of the Teddy Award for best feature film at the 59th Berlin International Film Festival
Shank	Simon Pearce	United Kingdom	Drama	Wayne Virgo, Marc Laurent, Alice Payne, Tom Bott, Garry Summers	
A Single Man	Tom Ford	United States	Drama	Colin Firth, Julianne Moore, Nicholas Hoult, Matthew Goode, Jon Kortajarena	Film adaptation of the novel of the same name by Christopher Isherwood
Somewhere I Have Never Traveled	Fu Tian-yu	Taiwan	Drama	Austin Lin, Yu Shin, Li Yung-Feng, Lin Mei-hsiu, Mei Fang, Wasir Chou	a.k.a. 帶我去遠方
Soundless Wind Chime	Kit Hung	Hong Kong; Switzerland; China	Drama	Lu Yu Lai, Bernhard Bulling, Marie Omlin, Gilles Tschudi, Ruth Schwegler, Wella Zhang, Li Wai Foon, Wong Siu Yin, Hannes Lindenblatt, Jackie Leung	Chinese/Western gay relationship
Spring Fever	Lou Ye	Hong Kong; France; China	Drama	Qin Hao, Chen Sicheng, Tan Zhuo, Wu Wei, Jiang Jiaqi, Huang Xuan	
Strella	Panos H. Koutras	Greece	Drama	Mina Orfanou, Yiannis Kokiasmenos, Minos Theoharis, Betty Vakalidou, Akis Ioannou and Argiris Kavidas	
The String	Mehdi Ben Attia	France; Belgium; Tunisia	Drama	Claudia Cardinale, Antonin Stahly, Salim Kechiouche, Rihab Mejri, Driss Ramdi	
Taking Woodstock	Ang Lee	United States	Comedy, drama	Demetri Martin, Imelda Staunton, Henry Goodman, Liev Schreiber, Jonathan Groff, Eugene Levy, Emile Hirsch, Paul Dano, Kelli Garner, Jeffrey Dean Morgan, Adam Pally, Mamie Gummer, Dan Fogler, Skylar Astin, Adam LeFevre, Richard Thomas, Kevin Chamberlin, Darren Pettie, Katherine Waterston	Based on the memoir Taking Woodstock: A True Story of a Riot, a Concert and a Life by Elliot Tiber and Tom Monte
The Topp Twins: Untouchable Girls	Leanne Pooley	New Zealand	Documentary	Profiles The Topp Twins, a lesbian comedy music duo from New Zealand	The film was a nominee for Outstanding Documentary at the 21st GLAAD Media Awards.
Toto Forever	Roberto F. Canuto	Spain; United States	Short Drama	Kylan James, Kjord Davis, Diana Grivas, Alexander Aguila and Alexandra Smothers	a.k.a. Toto Para Siempre and Siempre Toto
To Die like a Man	João Pedro Rodrigues	Portugal; France	Drama, fantasy, musical	Fernando Santos, Chandra Malatitch, Miguel Loureiro, Jenny Larue, Fernando Gomes	a.k.a. Morrer como um homem
Two Spirits	Lydia Nibley	United States	Documentary	the story of the hate-murder of 16-year-old Navajo Fred Martinez. In the film, Nibley "affirms Martinez' Navajo sense of being a two spirit 'effeminate male', or nádleeh". Martinez' mother defined nádleeh as "half woman, half man".	
Undertow	Javier Fuentes-León	Peru; Colombia; France; Germany	Drama	Cristian Mercado, Manolo Cardona, Tatiana Astengo	a.k.a. Contracorriente; winner of the World Cinema Audience Award: Dramatic at the 2010 Sundance Film Festival
A Wake	Penelope Buitenhuis	Canada	Drama	Tara Nicodemo, Graham Abbey, Krista Sutton, Raoul Bhaneja, Martha Burns, Kristopher Turner, Nicholas Campbell	
The War Boys	Ron Daniels	United States	Drama	Benjamin Walker, Victor Rasuk, Brian J. Smith, Peter Gallagher, Micaela Nevárez, Teresa Yengue, Cheyenne Serano, Ross Kelly	Co-written by Naomi Wallace, based on her play of the same name
Wild About Harry	Gwen Wynne	United States	Drama	Tate Donovan, Adam Pascal, Danielle Savre, Skye McCole Bartusiak, Josh Peck, Corey Sevier, Susan Anspach, James Sikking	film had the original title American Primitive and a script titled Once in a Very Blue Moon.
