= Jörg Hube =

German actor and director

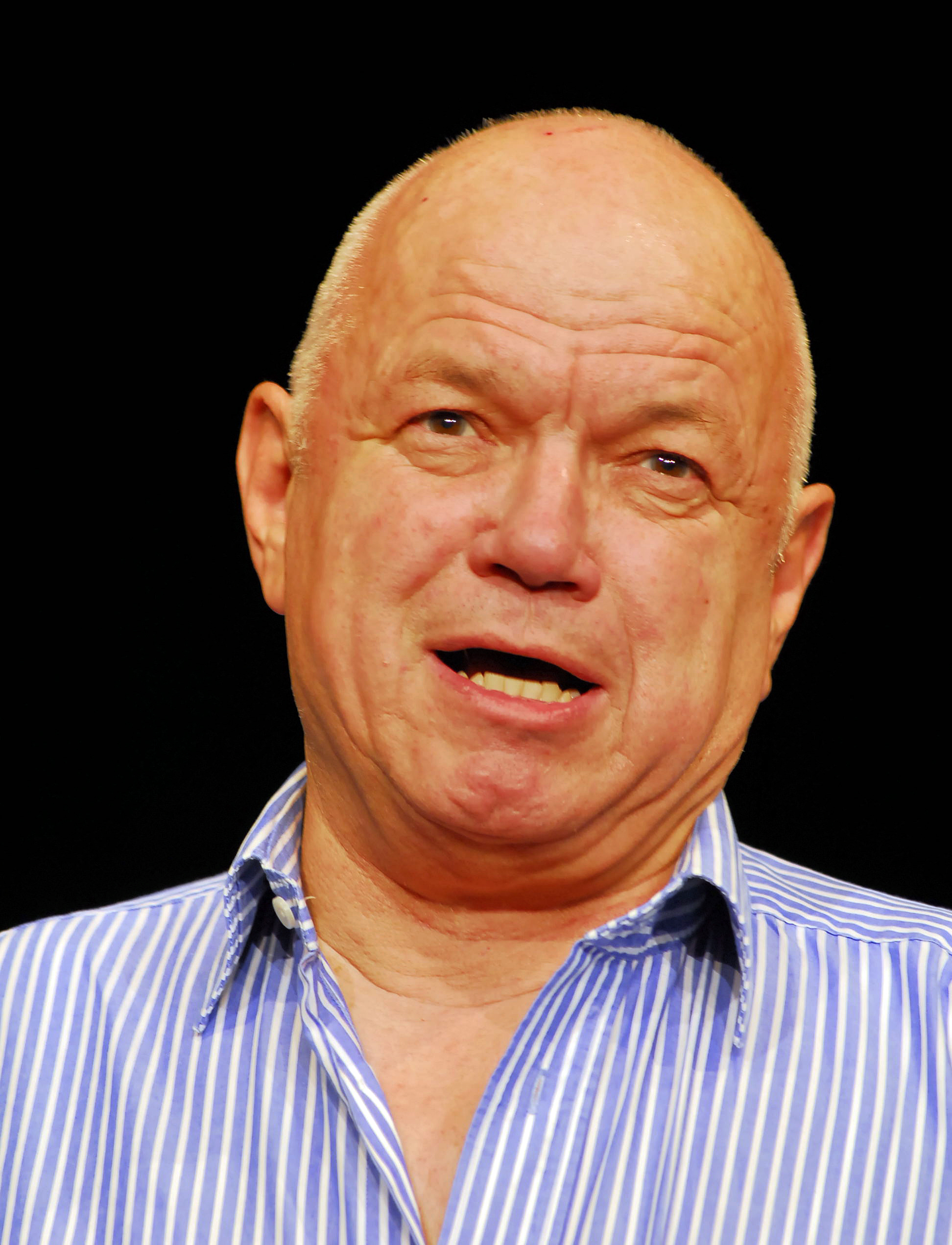
- Born: 22 November 1943; Neuruppin, Germany
- Died: 19 June 2009 (aged 65); Munich, Germany
- Occupation: actor

Jörg Hube (22 November 1943 – 19 June 2009) was a German actor and director. He died of cancer. He was buried at the Winthir Cemetery in Munich. His estate has been cared for since 2011 at the Munich literary archive Monacensia, which also organizes an exhibition of the estate.

== Theatre ==
Some of Hube's roles:

- 1973 in Plenzdorf's Die neuen Leiden des jungen W., München
- 1974 in Brecht's Die heilige Johanna der Schlachthöfe
- 1978 in Widmer's Nepal, München
- 1981 in Mitterer's Kein Platz für Idioten, München
- 1985 in Bauern sterben, München
- 1994 as Klosterbruder in Lessing's Nathan der Weise, München
- 1995 as Franz Schritt in Kroetz' Bauerntheater, München
- 1998 as Puntila in Brecht's Herr Puntila und sein Knecht Matti, München
- 1998 in Ringsgwandl's König Ludwig II. – Die volle Wahrheit
- 1999 as Polymestor in Euripides' Hekabe, München

== Films and television programmes ==
- 1972: The Italian
- 1972–81: Das feuerrote Spielmobil (as Herr Koch)
- 1976: Der Fall Bundhund (as Bundhund)
- 1976: Tatort: Wohnheim Westendstraße (as Bauführer)
- 1977: Tatort: Schüsse in der Schonzeit (as Wirt Dirscherl)
- 1979: Blauer Himmel, den ich nur ahne (as Ludwig Thoma)
- 1980: Tatort: Der Zeuge (as Kommissar Paul Enders)
- 1981: Der Gerichtsvollzieher (as Florian Kreittmayer)
- 1982: Tatort: Das Mädchen auf der Treppe (as Straub)
- 1982: Die Weiße Rose (as Oberregierungsrat)
- 1983: Monaco Franze, episode 8: Macht's nur so weiter! (as Herr Röhrl)
- 1984: Heimat (as Otto Wohlleben)
- 1986: The Old Fox: Das Attentat (as Taxifahrer)
- 1987: Die Hausmeisterin (as Tankstellenbesitzer)
- 1987: The Hothouse (as Frost-Forrestier)
- 1988: Der Schwammerlkönig (as Champignonzüchter Antl)
- 1989: Löwengrube – Die Grandauers und ihre Zeit (in the first four episodes as Ludwig Grandauer, then as his son Karl Grandauer)
- 1994: Polizeiruf 110: Gespenster (as Polizeipräsident)
- 1995: Transatlantis
- 1996: Sophie – Schlauer als die Polizei (as Kriminalrat Ludwig Mayerhofer)
- 1997: Silent Night (as Johann Burgschwaiger)
- 1998: Kreuzwege (as Achatius Achaz)
- 1999: Die Verbrechen des Professor Capellari: Tod eines Königs (as Bachhaus)
- 1999: Requiem for a Romantic Woman (as Oberster Richter)
- 2000: Café Meineid: Nimmer schee (as Hans Ferdl)
- 2002: Café Meineid: Schnee von gestern (as Paul Bachleitner)
- 2004: The Old Fox: Ein mörderisches Geheimnis (as Martin Brand)
- 2005: Sophie Scholl – The Final Days (as Robert Scholl)
- 2007: Das große Hobeditzn (as Korbinian Hobeditz)
- 2008: Tatort: Der oide Depp (as Robert 'Roy' Esslinger)
- 2008: The Legend of Brandner Kaspar (as Petrus)
- 2009: Franzi (as Franz Ostermeier)
- 2009: Polizeiruf 110: Klick gemacht (as Hauptkommissar Friedrich Papen)

== Awards ==
- 1982 German Kleinkunstpreis in the Sparte Cabaret
- 1992 and 1993 Adolf-Grimme-Prize
- 1993 Theatre Prize of the Capital of Munich
- 1996 German Kabarettpreis, First Prize
- 1997 Prix Pantheon Category Reif & Bekloppt
- 1999 Schwabinger Art Award Honorary Prize
- 2000 Oberbayerischer Culture Prize
- 2009 Bayerischer Honorary Kabarettpreis
