= Nikolai Müllerschön =

German film Writer/Director (born 1958)

Nikolai Müllerschön (sometimes credited as Niki Müllerschön) is a German film Writer/Director.

He was born in 1958 in Stuttgart, West Germany and moved to Munich in 1968. He has lived in Los Angeles since 1992.

He started as a stills photographer, worked as continuity supervisor, assistant cameraman, sound engineer, assistant director, Director of Photography on Documentary Films, commercials, industrial films, Television-Films/Features and Theatrical Feature Films in Europe, the US and Asia. His first feature as Director was in 1979. He worked as screenwriter, creative producer and Director on Theatrical Features, TV-Features, Mini-Series and TV-Drama-Series.

== Filmography ==
Title	Year	Function	Notes	Source
Inflation im Paradies	1980	Director, writer	35mm, color, 90 minutes. Anthology film, segment "Schnelle Nacht".	
Schulmädchen '84	1983	Director	35mm, color, 79 minutes.	
Ein irres Feeling	1984	Director	35mm, color, 86 minutes.	
Orchideen des Wahnsinns	1984	Director	35mm, color, 80 minutes.	
Operation Dead End	1985	Director, writer	35mm, color, 92 minutes.	
Orpheus	1987	Director	Color, 84 minutes.	
In the Flesh	1995	Director	95 minutes, color, 35mm, original title: Im Sog des Bösen.	
The Red Baron	2008	Director, writer, producer	126 minutes, color, 35mm.	
Subject 15	2010	Director	81 minutes, color, working title: Dumping Grounds	
Harms	2012	Director, writer, producer	98 minutes, color.	
Women	2013	Director, writer, producer		
Hit	2014	Director, writer, producer		

== Television ==
Director

- 1988: Bubbles, Feature. Several TV-screenings, shown at "Children’s Film Festival". Children/Comedy.
- 1988/89: Die glückliche Familie, ZDF. 16mm, color. 10 episodes (50 minutes). Family Soap.
- 1990/91: Inside Bunte, ProSieben, Creation/Design/Creative Producer. RTL Magazine Show.
- 1991: Der Sturm, BR, TV-Mini-Series. 16mm, color. 6 episodes (30 minutes). Drama/Documentary.
- 1992: Der Millionär, ARD, TV-Series. 16mm, color 28 minutes. 4 episodes. Drama/Thriller.
- 1993: Der Gletscher Clan, ProSieben, mini-series. 1 Pilot (94 minutes) and 7 episodes (48 minutes). Drama.
- 1994: Der Gletscher Clan, ProSieben, mini-series. Nominated for GRIMME-PREIS 1995. 6 episodes (48 minutes). Drama.
- 1994: Alles außer Mord, ProSieben, TV-Feature. 16 mm, color, 96 minutes. Crime/Thriller/Comedy.
- 1995: Hals über Kopf, ProSieben, TV-Feature, 16mm, color, 96 minutes. Chosen Best German TV - Program (crime/Thriller) by European TV Festival. Crime/Thriller/Comedy.
- 1996: The Girl's the Witness, Sat.1, TV-Feature, 16mm, color, 104 minutes, (aired 1997, 2nd best ratings/day all networks). Crime/Thriller.
- 1997: Revenge, Sat.1, TV-event movie, (aired in 1997, 2nd best ratings / day – all networks, best/week for network). Drama/Thriller.
- 1997: Delayed Exposure, TV Event-Movie, RTL (aired 1997, best ratings of week - total, 17th best ratings of year at network - TV-movies). Drama/Thriller.
- 1998: Freunde fürs Leben, ZDF, Mini-series, pilot and 2 episodes. Family Soap.
- 1998: Prototype, ProSieben, TV-Feature. Action/Thriller.
- 1999: Paul and Clara, Sat.1, TV-Feature. Love/Drama.
- 2003-2004: Die Verbrechen des Professor Capellari, 3 two-hour episodes
- 2005: Mutter aus heiterem Himmel, Sat.1, TV-Feature
- 2005: Five Stars, ZDF, pilot and 4 episodes, drama mini series
- 2009: Kathi, ARD, TV-Feature.
- 2010: Aber jetzt erst recht, ARD, TV-Feature
- 2011: Doppelgängerin, ARD, TV-Feature
- 2012: Hochzeiten, ARD, TV-Feature
- 2012: Hochzeiten Zwei (AT), ARD, TV-Feature
- 2013: Almuth und Rita, TV-Feature
- 2014: Last Exit Sauerland, TV-Feature

Writer

- 1990/91: Inside Bunte, ProSieben. TV-Magazine. Creator, Writer, Creative Producer.
- 1992/93: The Glacier Clan, ProSieben. TV- Mini-series - Drama / Comedy. Pilot / 7 episodes. Co-creator/Co-writer/Director/Creative Producer.
- 1993: The Glacier Clan, ProSieben. TV Mini-series - Drama/Comedy. 6 Episodes. Creator / Writer/Creative Producer.
- 1995: Desperate Measures, Theatrical Feature, 96 minutes. Idea by.
- 1995: The Girl's the Witness, Sat.1. TV-Feature Thriller/Drama. Co-Writer.
- 1996: 60 Minuten Angst, Sat.1. TV-Feature- Thriller/Drama. Creator / Writer.
- 1996: Revenge, RTL. TV-Feature - Thriller/Drama. Creator / Writer.
- 1996: The King, ZDF. TV-Feature - Thriller/Drama. Writer.
- 1998: Freunde fürs Leben, ZDF. TV-Series – Drama. Writer, Co-Creator of new release, 5 episodes.
- 1998: Chasing Tales, TV-Feature, Romantic Comedy (in development for PRO7).
- 2001-2002: Die Verbrechen des Professor Capellari, four two hour episodes.
- 2009: Kathi, ARD, TV-Feature.
- 2010: Aber jetzt erst recht, TV-Feature
- 2011: Doppelgängerin, TV-Feature
- 2012: Hochzeiten, ARD, TV-Feature
- 2012: Hochzeiten Zwei, TV-Feature

== Short films ==
- Der Wettkampf, 1984. 35mm, color, 12 minutes.

== Awards ==
- "GLACIER CLAN": Nominated for "GRIMME PREIS in 1995. (13 episodes & pilot, co-written, written and directed by NM)
- "HALS ÜBER KOPF": Awarded Best TV-Feature (Crime/Thriller) by "European TV Festival" in 1996. (Directed by NM)
- "DER WETTKAMPF": Awarded "Best Theatrical Short" in 1985. (Written and directed by NM)
- "OPERATION DEAD END": Awarded "Besonders Wertvoll" in 1986. (Written and directed by NM)
- "OPERATION DEAD END": Nominated Best Picture at Sidges Film Festival/Spain in 1986. (Written and directed by NM)
- “THE RED BARON”: Best Feature Film at DELRAY BEACH FILM 2010
- “THE RED BARON”: Platinum Remi Award for Best Action Adventure Theatrical Feature at 43rd Annual Worldfest Houston International Film Festival 2010
- "HARMS": Best Leading Actor (Heiner Lauterbach) at Tirana International Film Festival 2013
