= Saskia Vester =

German actress and author

- Born: 24 July 1959 (age 66); Saarbrücken, West Germany
- Occupations: Actress and author

Saskia Vester (born 24 July 1959) is a German actress and author.

== Life ==
Vester was born in Saarbrücken, the daughter of the biochemist and environmentalist Frederic Vester and the sister of actress Madeleine Vester.

After completing her training at the Neue Münchner Schauspielschule, Vester began acting in plays, among others at Theater Augsburg, Staatstheater Nürnberg, Stadttheater Ingolstadt, at the Kampnagel in Hamburg and Theater44 and Komödie im Bayerischen Hof in Munich. At the same time, and since 2000 exclusively, she worked in numerous theatrical and TV films as well as in TV series. In 1985, Vester published her own novel, Pols Reise.

Vester lives with her husband, television producer Robbie Flörke, and their two children in Munich.

== Filmography (selection) ==
- 1983: Dingo
- 1986: Der Schwammerlkönig
- 1986: Zwei auf der Straße
- 1987: Hans im Glück
- 1987: Franz Xaver Brunnmayr – Der sechzigste Geburtstag (TV series)
- 1988: Doppelter Einsatz
- 1988: Alle meine Töchter
- 1988: Wilder Westen inclusive
- 1989: Filser Briefe
- 1990: Tatort – Wer zweimal stirbt
- 1990: Das Geheimnis der falschen Spuren
- 1991: Tatort – Kinderlieb
- 1991: Ein Fall für zwei – Eiskalt
- 1991: Wie Pech und Schwefel
- 1991: Die Anhalterin
- 1991: Abgetrieben
- 1993: Janas Freiheit
- 1993: Rußige Zeiten (TV series)
- 1993: Im Schatten der Gipfel
- 1994: Women Are Simply Wonderful
- 1995: Tatort – Tod eines Auktionators
- 1995: Ausweglos
- 1995: Eldorado
- 1996: Der Fahrradfahrer
- 1996: Rendezvous des Todes
- 1997: Winterschläfer
- 1997: Zum sterben schön
- 1997: Die Schule
- 1998: Solo for Clarinet
- 1998: Supersingle
- 1998: Gestern ist nie vorbei
- 1998: Zwei allein
- 1998: Die Verbrechen des Professor Capellari
- 1998: Der Bulle von Tölz (The Mistletoe Murder)
- 1998–2001: Anwalt Abel (TV series, 7 episodes)
- 1999: Tatort – Kinder der Gewalt
- 1999: Vertrauen ist alles
- 1999: The Coq Is Dead
- 1999: Gangster
- 1999: Eine schräge Familie
- 2000: Tatort – Nach eigenen Gesetzen
- 2000: Love Trip
- 2000: Ich beiß zurück
- 2001: Anam
- 2001: Victor – Der Schutzengel – Amoklauf
- 2001: Mein Vater und andere Betrüger
- 2001: Die Westentaschenvenus
- 2002: Verdammt verliebt (TV series, 26 episodes)
- 2002: Geht nicht gibt’s nicht
- 2002: Der Glücksbote
- 2002: Mann gesucht, Liebe gefunden
- 2002: Weihnachten im September
- 2002: Mutter auf der Palme
- 2003: Die Rosenheim-Cops – Blattschuss
- 2003: Die Ärztin
- 2003: Der Bulle von Tölz (Painting with Vincent)
- 2003: Ein großes Mädchen wie du (Une grande fille comme toi)
- 2004: Ein Gauner Gottes
- 2004: Guys and Balls
- 2004: Im Zweifel für die Liebe
- 2004: K3 – Kripo Hamburg – Porzellan
- 2004: Mein Weg zu dir heißt Liebe
- 2005: Das Gespenst von Canterville
- 2005–2010: Die Landärztin
- 2005: Heirate meine Frau
- 2005: Grenzverkehr
- 2005: Liebe wie am ersten Tag
- 2005: Das Glück klopft an die Tür (alternative title: Rein ins Leben)
- 2006: Donna Leon – Das Gesetz der Lagune
- 2007–2009: KDD – Kriminaldauerdienst
- 2006: Grave Decisions
- 2006: In the Name of Love
- 2006: Das Glück klopt an die Tür
- 2007: Die Schnüfflerin – Peggy kann’s nicht lassen
- 2008: Unser Mann im Süden – Ausgetrickst
- 2008–2012: Der Schwarzwaldhof (6 episodes)
- 2008: Don Quichote – Gib niemals auf!
- 2008: Wilsberg – Das Jubiläum
- 2009: Savvy Lena
- 2009: Bleib bei mir
- 2009: Die göttliche Sophie
- 2009: All You Need Is Love – Meine Schwiegertochter ist ein Mann
- 2010: Ayla
- 2010: Hochzeitsreise zu viert
- 2010: Das Haus ihres Vaters
- 2011: Almanya: Welcome to Germany
- 2011: Für kein Geld der Welt
- 2011: The Tuesday Ladies
- 2011: Nach der Hochzeit bin ich weg!
- 2011: Polizeiruf 110: Denn sie wissen nicht, was sie tun
- 2012: Balthasar Berg – Sylt sehen und sterben
- 2012: Emilie Richards – Spuren der Vergangenheit
- 2012: Heiraten ist auch keine Lösung
- 2012: Autumn Child
- 2012: Jeder Tag zählt
- 2012: Mord in bester Gesellschaft – Der Tod der Sünde
- 2013: Utta Danella: Wer küsst den Doc?
- 2013: Viva la libertà
- 2014: Kreuzfahrt ins Glück – Hochzeitsreise nach Barcelona
- 2014: Wealthy Corpses: A Crime Story from Starnberg
- 2014: Die Dienstagsfrauen – Sieben Tage ohne
- 2014: Die Fremde und das Dorf
- 2014: Schluss! Aus! Amen!
- 2015: Die Dienstagsfrauen – Zwischen Kraut und Rüben
- 2015: Kubanisch für Fortgeschrittene
- 2015: The Santa Claus Gang
- 2016: Beat Beat Heart
- 2016: In aller Freundschaft – Spott und Ruhm
- 2016: Marie fängt Feuer
- 2017: Frühling Schritt ins Licht

== Radio ==
- 2012: Der Stalker – ARD Radio-Tatort (Bayerischer Rundfunk) – Regie: Ulrich Lampen

== Awards ==
- 2007: Bavarian TV Awards for the role of Kristin Bender in KDD – Kriminaldauerdienst

== Literature ==
- Pols Reise (1985)
