= Wolle =

Wolle is a German surname meaning "wool". Notable people with the surname include:

- Arno Wolle (1903–1988), Danish naturopath and mathematician
- Charles R. Wolle (1935–2022), American jurist from Iowa; former federal judge of the U. S. district court
- Christian Jacob Wolle (1788–1863), American plant collector and innkeeper
- Francis Wolle (1817–1893), American priest of the Moravian Church
- Gertrud Wolle (1891–1952), German film actress
- Muriel Sibell Wolle (1898–1977), American artist; known for paintings of mining communities
- Robert H. Wolle, Sr. (1924–2017), American environmentalist and public health pioneer
- Stefan Wolle (born 1950), German historian
- William D. Wolle (born 1928), American foreign service officer and ambassador
