= Jürgen Tonkel =

German actor (born 1962)

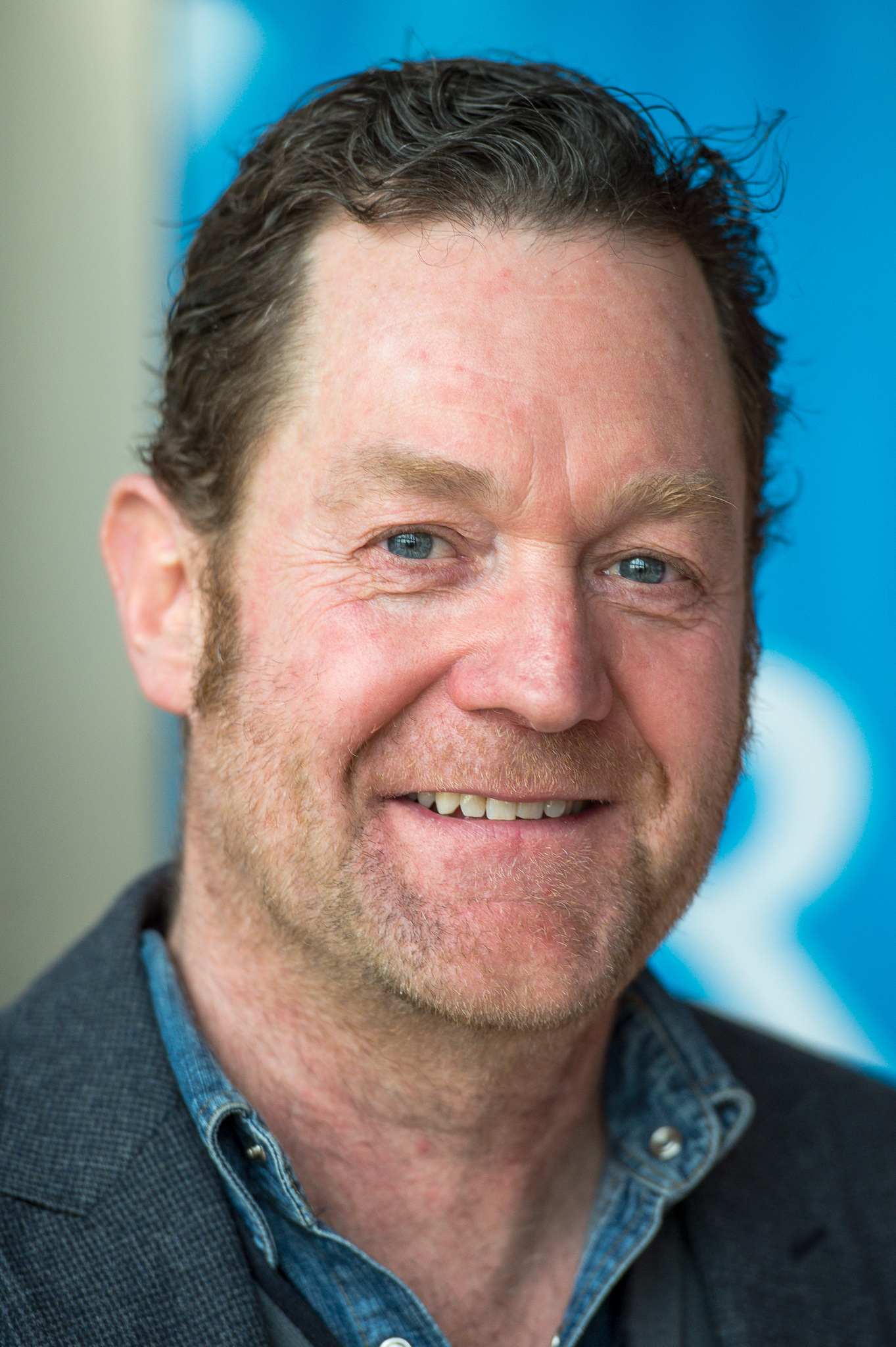
- Jürgen Tonkel (2015)
- Born: 23 August 1962 (age 63); Berg, Upper Bavaria, West Germany
- Occupation: Actor

Jürgen Tonkel (born 23 August 1962) is a German actor.

== Filmography ==
- 1985: Blam! – Bruno
- 1988: Büro, Büro
- 1990: Das einfache Glück – Frank
- 1990: Sekt oder Selters
- 1990: Werner – Beinhart! – Landadeliger
- 1991: Freispiel – Paul
- 1992: Die Distel
- 1996: Der Trip – Die nackte Gitarre 0,5
- 1996: And Nobody Weeps for Me – Policeman
- 1999: Medicopter 117 – Jedes Leben zählt – Ex-Polizist Woratz
- 1999: Zum Sterben schön
- 1999: Midsommar Stories – Dr. Hofmann (segment "Sabotage")
- 1999–2016: Tatort – Karl Maurer / Gerlach / Mad gunmen / Michael / Klaus Aigner / Herbert Renz / Axel Gebhardt
- 1999–2008: Hausmeister Krause
- 2000: Einmal leben – Kellner
- 2000: Double Pack
- 2000: Geier im Reisrand – Konrad Heckmann
- 2002: Do Fish Do It? – Wolf
- 2003–2007: K3 – Kripo Hamburg – Paul Reisinger
- 2003–2006: Leipzig Homicide – Rolf Dieter Clausen / Bernd Hofmann
- 2004: Abgefahren – Obermaier
- 2004: Sommersturm – Hansi
- 2004: Der Untergang – Erich Kempka
- 2005: Der Staatsanwalt – Paul Höltgen
- 2005: Grenzverkehr – Herr Jäger
- 2005: Rose – Jürgen Weber
- 2006: Grave Decisions (Wer früher stirbt ist länger tot) – Alfred
- 2006: Alarm für Cobra 11 – Pokorny
- 2008: Spiel mir das Lied und du bist tot! – Jerry-Lee-Larry
- 2008: Räuber Kneißl – Kommandant Brandmaier
- 2008: Ihr könnt euch niemals sicher sein – Thomas Rother
- 2008: Let's Do It in Finnish – Carlo Schneider
- 2008: The Legend of Brandner Kaspar – Der Heilige Nantwein
- 2008: Stolberg – Polizeihauptmeister Achim Lorentz
- 2009: All You Need Is Love – Meine Schwiegertochter ist ein Mann – Christian Remminger
- 2010: SOKO Donau – Robert Hanser
- 2010–2017: Die Rosenheim-Cops – Karl Schretzmayer
- 2010: Die Hummel – Pit
- 2010: Das Haus ihres Vaters – Rolf Bartels
- 2010: Franzi
- 2011: Lessons of a Dream (Der ganz große Traum) – Dr. Jessen
- 2011: Rookie – Fast platt – Mickrig
- 2011: When the Foehn Wind Is Blowing – Hauptkommissar Johann Ostler
- 2012: Was weg is, is weg – Franz Much
- 2012–2017: Die Chefin – Inspector Paul Böhmer
- 2012: Die Braut im Schnee – Kai Döring
- 2012: Pension Freiheit – Feuerwehrkommandant
- 2012: Don't You Believe It! – Bestatter Möslang
- 2012: Polizeiruf 110 – Fieber
- 2013: Young Fast & Fierce – Sam Kamschik
