= Das feuerrote Spielmobil =

- Genre: children series
- Created by: Harald Hohenacker, Philipp Sonntag, Raimund Ulbich
- Starring: Peter Kern, Philipp Sonntag, Uwe Falkenbach, Erich Schleyer, Josef Schwarz, Jörg Hube, Anja Franke, Michael Habeck, Frithjof Vierock, Marion Kracht
- Country of origin: Germany
- No. of episodes: 184

Production
- Producer: Bayerischer Rundfunk – Production start: 1969
- Running time: 30 minutes

Original release
- Release: 21 April 1972 – 12 July 1981

Das feuerrote Spielmobil is a German television children's television series, broadcast from April 21, 1972, to July 12, 1981. A total of 184 episodes of the series produced by Bayerischer Rundfunk (BR) were broadcast in the afternoon program of ARD. The concept of the series was developed and produced from 1969 as a successor of the children's series "Spielschule" and shot in Munich, because the BR managers considered, that the social situation in Germany was not correctly represented by Sesamstraße and therefore needed a replacement program.

In the show a red minibus, equipped as a camera car, drove across the country and showed encounters with people and their stories.

At the beginning of the series the Spielmobil was an Opel Blitz. The aim of the series was to stimulate the imagination of the audience and to teach social interaction. In the first five episodes the two dolls Maxifant and Minifant played in the series, which then got their own series, because the production partners separated. Instead, the puppets Biff and Wuff (designed by Jan Gulbransson) and the animated character Wummi were used.

During the episodes several fairy tales were recounted, especially Grimms' fairy tales such as Little Red Riding Hood, Doctor Know-All, or The Brave Little Tailor. In addition, stories with Felix (Uwe Falkenbach) and brother Tom (Erich Schleyer), of which 25 episodes appeared on DVD, the thin Mr. Schwarz (Josef Schwarz) and the fat Mr. Kern (Peter Kern) as well as with the dream car. The best-known season within the series was "Das Haus mit der Nr. 30" (The House with the No. 30) that was on air from 1977 to 1979 with 41 episodes.

Other well-known contributors from the theater and cabaret scene were, Jörg Hube, Anja Franke, Michael Habeck, Frithjof Vierock, Philipp Sonntag and Marion Kracht.

A technical innovation in television at the time was, that the graphical representation of the fairy tales, e.g. Doctor Know-All, The Blue Light, The Brave Little Tailor, or The Old Sultan was designed with the bluescreen technique. Further episodes ran under the title Geschichten mit Philipp Sonntag und seinem Traummobil, Kern und Schwarz, Felix und Bruder Tom.

In spring of 2009, the German Opel Museum acquired the original car (an Opel Blitz, year of construction: 1962) of the first season, which remained almost unchanged, from its last owner. His brother had bought the Spielmobil from the BR in the early 1980s and took it to Namibia in the course of the emigration to Otjiwarongo.

== See also ==
- List of German television series
