= Sesamstraße =

German children's television series

- Genre: Children's educational programming
- Opening theme: Der, die, das
- Ending theme: Der, die, das (instrumental)
- Country of origin: Germany
- Original language: German

Production
- Running time: 30 minutes
- Production companies: Norddeutscher Rundfunk; Sesame Workshop

Original release
- Network: Das Erste; Kika
- Release: 8 January 1973 – present

Sesamstraße (German: [ˈzeːzamˌʃtʁaːsə], Sesame Street in English) is a German children's television series that airs primarily in Germany and the surrounding German-speaking countries. It is a spin-off of the first preschool programme Sesame Street. The show has been running on Norddeutscher Rundfunk (NDR) since 1973, premiering on 8 January in that year. Sesamstraße is also shown on the children's channel, KiKa. It is made for children between the ages of three and seven.

== History ==
=== The Dubbed Era: 1973-onwards ===
After a short test run of a few original, undubbed Sesame Street episodes, from August 1972 onward, the German version of the show premiered on 8 January 1973. The first three seasons, or 250 episodes of Sesamstraße consisted of the original American episodes dubbed into German in Hamburg. Initially, only the opening and closing songs and sequences were changed, with new lyrics written by Volker Ludwig and tunes by Ingfried Hoffmann. The title of the German theme song is "Der, die, das (wer, wie, was – wieso, weshalb, warum – wer nicht fragt, bleibt dumm!)," almost literally translating to "this, this and that (who, how, what – why, why and why – those who don't ask stay dumb!)."

In Bavaria, Bayerischer Rundfunk felt that the Sesame Street set was too gritty to suit German children, and consequently developed its own children's programme called Das feuerrote Spielmobil (The fire-red Play-mobile). Variety shows like Peter Alexander präsentiert Spezialitäten in 1975 promoted the show by visiting the original United States set and taping special footage. From 1976 through 1977, the street scenes were dropped, partly as the result of a constant onslaught by protesting parents who were unhappy with the "controversial" character of Oscar the Grouch. Instead, a new framing story was created, following the antics of a boy named Bumfidel and his mother. Since these stories did not take place on a street, the show's title was temporarily rendered incomprehensible.

=== The Co-production Era: 1977-onwards ===
In 1977, a German street set was built at Studio Hamburg for German framing stories. Samson, a bear (1978–2009, and since 2013) and Tiffy the bird (1978–2005) replaced Big Bird (Bibo) and Oscar the Grouch (Oskar der Griesgram) as main characters, and the new version debuted on January 2, 1978. The early puppets were built by Kermit Love, but nowadays, Sesame Workshop builds the puppets for Sesamstraße. Each 30-minute episode featured the new puppets interacting with a pair of human characters; consistently one male, one female. The individual sketches of Sesame Street's original American inhabitants were dubbed over, and remained the main part of the show, but some were edited to omit intros that displayed words in English (such as The Adventures of Super Grover or the Sesame Street News Flash skits).

In the following years, more characters were added to the German street scenes, such as the German-built, androgynous Uli von Bödefeld (Uli is short for Ulrich), also called Herr von Bödefeld (1978–1988), and Finchen, a snail (1983, 1989–present). Just as in its American counterpart, the German characters have been remodeled over the decades. Most obvious were changes in Samson and Tiffy; Finchen has also had her fair share of fabric surgery.

During this era, the fact that the street stories took place in a studio was never kept a secret. Some parts of the street were simply 'matted in' during an episode, or the characters would ask for help from the studio crew; one episode about Samson trying to scratch a flea ends with the entire studio crew itching. The matting also allowed the characters to show up in different locations, like a beach, a small deserted island that would be surrounded by an entire ocean through the snap of one's fingers, a nearby train station, or the roof of the studio.

While Big Bird and Oscar the Grouch, both performed by Caroll Spinney, had visited Sesamstraße for the 10th Anniversary special before, a highlight of this era was the celebration of Sesamstraße's 1000th episode, the "Sesamelly Zirkusshow." It was a circus gala performance taped at "Zirkus Althoff," in which Big Bird appeared alongside the German characters one more time.

In 1985 and 1986, no new episodes were taped. Instead, a wild mix of repeats was shown on television. From 1986 onward, new episodes with two new human actors were produced, and while the studio set remained largely the same, a bicycle shop was added, run by the new residents. Tiffy and Samson were slightly remodeled for the first time for these episodes.

In 1988, the studio set and original puppets were destroyed in a fire. The puppets were rebuilt in 1989 with significant changes. The new set was centered around the new bicycle shop that was introduced in 1986, but the street stories no longer took place in a studio set. Instead, a courtyard was added, and new characters were introduced: Rumpel the Grouch (1989–2009), living inside a water barrel, and Buh (1989–2002), an owl housed inside a hollow tree. While the set offered Tiffy a new apartment-like living room in the coming years, it still featured Samson's cave in which he had lived prior to the set change. Uli von Bödefield was removed from the show due to the creators of Sesamstraße not wishing to pay licensing fees. Later in the 1990s, the courtyard slowly transitioned into an entire marketplace, a common social center for German towns and even city districts.

Leonie Löwenherz (Leonie Lionheart in English), a lioness (1989-early 1990s), was featured for a very short time after the set and puppets were destroyed in the fire. Just like Uli von Bödefeld, she was built by German puppet makers and not the Muppet Workshop. After her short-lived Sesame career, she got her own ALF-like show called "Leonie Löwenherz" on ARD, featuring herself, her two lion brothers, and a few human characters. During this time period, older puppets were re-used for new characters such as Simson (on and off in 1989–2000), Samson's cousin, with slight changes being made to his appearance (equipped with a hat, a tie, or another article of clothing). Originally, Simson was only imagined by Samson and other characters doubted his existence, much like Big Bird and Mr. Snuffleupagus in the United States.

In 2000, the cast was expanded further, and the sets changed once again. Newcomers to the puppet cast were Feli Filu (2000–2007), the monster reporter, the comic duo Pferd the horse (2002–present) and Wolle the sheep (2002–present), as well as a few recurring grouches, and some Anything Muppets. In 2005, after a 27-year presence on the show, Tiffy was replaced with single mom Moni (2005–2007) and her pink and furry daughter Lena (2005–2009). Since then, Sesamstraße has been visited by a more diverse cast of supporting Muppets than any other international version of Sesame Street. One-shot characters include Super Franky, Grouchella, Knut Köffelström, Turbo Theo, as well as various wolves, dogs, and other creatures. In 2006, German audiences' long-time favorites Bert and Ernie began appearing regularly in newly produced German segments. For the 36th season, the two moved into their own apartment on Sesamstraße, above a new human character named Frau Kowalski. The pair were often shown commenting on the street events from their balcony. As more and more previously used Muppets were borrowed from Sesame Workshop, more secondary characters evolved in their own sketches, such as the green Wolf vom Wörtersee in 2007.

In 2003, the German co-production's 30th anniversary was celebrated with a press conference and Axel Schulz, Ernie, Bert and Elmo (performed by Kevin Clash) in attendance, as the show gave a donation of €12,271.00 to UNICEF. Ernie and Bert appeared on a regular episode that year, as well as on the show's 30th anniversary television special.

Originally, an average episode used to consist of around 50 percent of American material, like most international co-productions of Sesame Street. From 2007 onwards, the American material has been used less often, so that eventually, an average Sesamstraße episode contains no more than one or two American-produced sketches. In addition, much as on Sesame Street since 2002, Sesamstraße's street scenes began to feature mostly at the beginning of each episode. Since 2008, the show has been shot in high definition. On 24 December 2008, a German-produced, 45-minute Christmas special called Weihnachten mit Ernie und Bert aired, featuring Ernie, Bert, and an Anything Muppet Santa Claus. In 2011, more segments were produced to air both as standalone segments outside the show, and within: "Ernie & Bert Songs" and "Ernie & Bert Märchensongs". From 2010 to 2012, the street stories were all repeats from previous episodes, although other new content was still being produced.

Since 2009 the program has been produced solely by NDR.

The show's 40th anniversary, on 1 October 2012, saw the introduction of new character Elmo: a resident of the street, who appeared in a treehouse setting as the new host of the show. New characters included a female friend of Elmo's, played by Julia Stinshoff, and Susi Schraube, an inventive girl appearing in a series of stop-motion segments. Established characters such as Rumpel and Samson were retired (although Samson made special appearances on the show in 2013 and 2014), while Pferd, Wolle, and Finchen remain part of the cast. Established characters such as Cookie Monster and Grover made guest appearances. Super Grover 2.0 was also added to the show beginning in 2013.

== Characters ==
The main character is Samson, a large brown bear who replaced Big Bird. Like Big Bird, Samson is a full-body muppet and is the main character. Samson likes to dance the mambo. "Feli Filu" is a reporter for the show, and has interviewed a number of German celebrities, including president Horst Köhler. Samson the bear and Tiffy the bird/monster replaced the main character Big Bird (Bibo) in 1978.

Other characters added later were Uli von Bödefeld, also called Herr von Bödefeld (1978–1988), Finchen the Snail (1980s), Rumpel the Grouch (1989; a German relative of Oscar the Grouch), and Buh the Owl (1989). Newer additions are Feli Filu the Monster reporter, the comic duo Pferd the Horse, and Wolle the sheep, a few grouches (including Grouchella and an Übergrouch) and some Anything Muppets.

Germany's Grouch character is called Rumpel. He hates rain when others love it, but loves rain when others complain about it. He lives in a rain barrel. His best friend is his pet caterpillar, Gustav. Little Bird has made some cameo appearances.

Bert and Ernie are among the most popular characters on Sesamstraße. In Germany, they were dubbed by:

- Ernie: Gerd Duwner (1973–1996), in the years 1997–2001 by Peter Kirchberger, and finally in 2001 by Michael Habeck.
- Bert: Wolfgang Kieling (1973–1985). From 1986, after Kieling's death Horst Schön took over synchronization, followed by other speakers as Rolf Julich and Christian Rode. Since 2007, both of Martin Paas (Ernie) and Carsten Morar, Haffke (Bert) played, talked and synchronized.

=== Leonie Löwenherz ===
Leonie Löwenherz (Leonie Lionheart in English), a female lion, was featured for a very short time after the set and puppets were destroyed in a fire. Just like Uli von Bödefeld, she was most likely built by German Fabula Filmpuppen Workshop, and not the Sesame Workshop. After her short-lived Sesame career, she got her own (ALF-like) show called "Leonie Löwenherz" on ARD, featuring herself, her two lion brothers, and a few human characters.

=== German Muppet characters ===
- Samson, a male brown bear, similar in role and full-body puppet, to Big Bird (1978–2009, 2013–present)
- Simson, Samson's cousin and lookalike, often seen with a hat or a tie to distinguish him from Samson (on and off in 1989–2000)
- Tiffy, a pink female bird (1978–2004)
- Finchen, a (former male, now female) snail (on and off from 1978, 1989–present)
- Rumpel, a green Grouch that lives in a rain barrel. He has Gustav, a pet caterpillar (1989–2009)
- Buh, a male owl (1989–2000)
- Feli Filu, a blue female monster reporter (2000–2007)
- Pferd, a male horse (2000–present)
- Wolle, a male lamb (2000–present)
- Lena, a pink monster baby (2005–2009)
- Moni, a female photographer (2005–2009)
- Uli von Bödefeld, a male hedgehog-like creature (1978–1988)
- Leonie Löwenherz, a lioness (1989-early 1990s)

=== Humans (1978–1986) ===
- Henning (Henning Venske, a German actor – 1978–1979)
- Lilo (Liselotte Pulver, a Swiss actress – 1978–1986)
- Uwe (Uwe Friedrichsen, a German actor – 1979–1982)
- Horst (Horst Janson, a German actor – 1979–1986)
- Ute (Ute Willing, a German actress – 1979–1986)
- Ilse (Ilse Biberti, a German actress – 1979–1982)
- Elisabeth (Elisabeth Vitouch, a German actress – 1979–1982)
- Manfred (Manfred Krug, a German actor – 1982–1986)

=== Humans (1986–2010) ===
- Schorsch (Gernot Endemann, a German actor – 1986–1999)
- Bettina (Hildegard Krekel, a German actress – 1986–1989)
- Bettina 2 (Kirsten Spick, a German actress – 1989–1999)
- Opa (Grandpa) Brass (Ferdinand Dux, a German actor – 1992–2000)
- Pensionswirtin Helmi (Senta Bonneval, a German actress – 1995–1999)
- Musiker Alex (Alexander Geringas, a Hit Music Producer – 1995–2000)
- Jiviana (Vijak Bajani, a German-Turkish actress – 1995–2001)
- Caro (Caroline Kiesewetter, a German actress – 2000–2002)
- Caro 2 (Miriam Krause, a German actress – 2002–2004)
- Anke (Anke Engelke, a German comedian – 2003)
- Zauberer PePe (Wizard PePe in English) (Dirk Bach, a German comedian – 2000–2007)
- Ragazza die Wörterfee (Ragazza the word fairy in English) (Felicitas Woll, a German actress – 2007)
- Frau Kowalski (Adele Neuhauser, an Austrian actress – 2008)
- Nils (Nils Julius, a German actor – 2000–2010)

=== Humans (2010–present) ===
- Annette (Annette Frier, a German actress & comedian – 2005–2008, 2013)
- Mehmet (Mehmet Yılmaz, a German-Turkish actor – 2003–present)
- Ella (Franziska Troegner, a German actress – 2003–present)
- Julia (Julia Stinshoff, a German actress – 2012–present)

== Theme song ==
The theme song for Sesamstraße is "Der, die, das", whose melody and lyrics have little resemblance to the English version on Sesame Street. Der, die and das are nominative definite articles in German (so the song's title is "The, the, the"). In October 2012, this song was performed by the German Eurovision Song Contest winner Lena Meyer-Landrut who is accompanied by Elmo on the trumpet.
