= I Smile Back =

2015 film

- Theatrical release poster
- Directed by: Adam Salky
- Screenplay by: Paige Dylan; Amy Koppelman
- Based on: I Smile Back; 2008 novel by Amy Koppelman
- Produced by: Brian Koppelman; David Levien; Mike Harrop; Richard Arlook
- Starring: Sarah Silverman; Josh Charles; Thomas Sadoski; Mia Barron; Skylar Gaertner; Shayne Coleman; Kristin Griffith; Chris Sarandon; Terry Kinney
- Cinematography: Eric Lin
- Edited by: Tamara Meem
- Music by: Zack Ryan
- Production companies: Egoli Tossell Film; Koppelman/Levien
- Distributed by: Broad Green Pictures
- Release dates: January 25, 2015 (Sundance Film Festival); October 23, 2015 (United States)
- Running time: 85 minutes
- Country: United States
- Language: English

I Smile Back is a 2015 American drama film directed by Adam Salky and based on the 2008 novel of the same name by Amy Koppelman, who wrote the screenplay with Paige Dylan. The film stars Sarah Silverman as an upper-middle-class wife and mother struggling with mental illness and addiction. The film had its world premiere at the 2015 Sundance Film Festival on January 25, 2015. It also screened at the Toronto International Film Festival on September 16, 2015. The film was released in a limited release on October 23, 2015, by Broad Green Pictures. Despite the film's mixed critical reception, Silverman's performance was met with acclaim and earned her a nomination for Outstanding Performance by a Female Actor in a Leading Role at the 22nd Screen Actors Guild Awards.

== Plot ==
In a nice home in suburban New York, homemaker Laney Brooks snorts cocaine in the bathroom wearing only her panties while her husband Bruce plays outside with their young children, Eli and Janey. Laney remembers arguing with Bruce about their new dog. Later, Eli wakes from a nightmare and Laney comforts him.

As Bruce gets ready for work in the morning, Laney eyes the bathroom medicine cabinet, then prepares the children's lunches. She drives them to school and has a confrontation with the traffic guard who refuses to let her double-park. She greets her friend Susan and is prevented from entering for not having her ID; the guard reprimands her for not reading the school's emails notifying her of the new security measures. She reluctantly waves goodbye to her children and drives away, mocking the school guard as she smokes a cigarette.

At a hotel, she has sex with Susan's husband Donny, then chides him afterward for trying to show affection, telling him love means nothing. She showers as he sleeps and steals cash from his wallet to buy drugs. At dinner, Laney gets drunk sipping vodka and responds angrily when Eli relates a school friend's opinions. At bedtime she reminds Eli of his upcoming piano recital, then argues again with Bruce about their dog, dreading its eventual death. She phones Eli's friend's mother, curses at her, and hangs up, before drinking more vodka and swallowing some pills while snorting cocaine. She enters Janey's bedroom and uses a teddy bear to help her masturbate before starting to cry, crawling down the hall, and falling unconscious.

Bruce finds her and drives her to a rehabilitation facility, where she argues with the staff and dry heaves in the toilet. Later, her assigned physician, Dr. Page, notes that Laney has not taken her lithium prescription for months, which has worsened her addictions. She tells him of how her problems stem from childhood abandonment by her father, Roger. Laney's family visits her for lunch. She notices Eli has developed a tic, and she tries to confess and apologize to Bruce, but he rebuffs her. Later, she tells Dr. Page she wants to smile again. He tells her to take her medication and have faith in herself.

Home from rehab, Laney makes a cake with her family. The power goes out and they sing and dance by candlelight. Later, Laney and Bruce meet with a counselor regarding Eli's anxiety. Eli worries he too will have to go to rehab one day. Laney and Bruce later go to Donny's restaurant for a birthday dinner for Susan, who is now pregnant, where Laney insults another couple. She accompanies Bruce to a seminar in a hotel near Roger's home. While Bruce attends the conference, she secretly takes a cab to Roger's house, meeting her half-sister Daisy for the first time. She learns of her grandmother's untimely death. Roger only offers excuses for abandoning his family. Laney cries in the taxi back, calls Bruce, and gets no answer.

Laney goes to a bar and spends the rest of the evening getting drunk. At the hotel, Bruce packs. Laney enters, apologizing for missing dinner. Tired of her lies, he pushes her against the wall and shouts at her. Leaving, he tells her that the children will continue staying with his sister as he doesn't trust her and that he will meet them all at Eli's recital. At the event, Eli begins playing the piano, hesitantly at first but more confidently as he continues. All applaud when he finishes. Back at home, Laney praises Eli, then retreats to the bathroom. She tries to snort cocaine, and her damaged nasal passages cause her to suffer a nosebleed.

When her family discovers and confronts her, Laney gets in her SUV and tries to commit suicide by speeding through a busy intersection with her eyes closed. Emerging unscathed, she goes to see Donny, but he refuses to give her drugs and leaves to answer a phone call from Susan. Laney steals anti-anxiety pills from his desk and swallows them. She goes to another bar, drinks beer, and has drunken sex with a strange man in the basement. When she drunkenly taunts him, he slams her head twice into a stone wall and steals all the cash in her wallet. Later, she awakens caked in blood and takes a cab home.

In the predawn glow, she prepares lunches, still battered and bloody. She hugs the whimpering dog and notices Bruce staring at her from the upstairs landing. Her face cracking, she shuffles out of the house and shuts the door.

== Cast ==
- Sarah Silverman as Elaine "Laney" Brooks
- Josh Charles as Bruce Brooks
- Thomas Sadoski as Donny
- Mia Barron as Susan
- Skylar Gaertner as Eli Brooks
- Shayne Coleman as Janey Brooks
- Sean Reda as Henry
- Chris Sarandon as Roger
- Billy Magnussen as Zach
- Kristin Griffith as Nurse Pauline
- Oona Laurence as Daisy
- Clark Jackson as Mr. Odesky
- Terry Kinney as Dr. Page

== Release ==
The film had its world premiere at the Sundance Film Festival on January 25, 2015. Shortly after, Broad Green Pictures acquired distribution rights to the film. The film was selected to screen at the Jerusalem Film Festival on July 11, 2015. and the Deauville Film Festival on September 6, 2015, as well as the Toronto International Film Festival on September 16, 2015, the Oldenburg International Film Festival on September 19, 2015, and the Chicago International Film Festival on October 16, 2015. The film was released on October 23, 2015, in a limited release.

=== Home media ===
I Smile Back was released on DVD and Blu-ray in the United States on February 23, 2016.

== Reception ==
=== Critical reception ===
I Smile Back received mixed reviews from critics, with universal praise for Silverman's performance. On Rotten Tomatoes, the film has a 49% approval rating, based on 71 reviews, with an average rating of 5.76/10. The website's critical consensus reads, "I Smile Back serves as a powerful showcase for Sarah Silverman's dramatic range, but fails to surround her committed performance with a movie worthy of its depth". On Metacritic, the film has a score of 59 out of 100, based on 19 critics, indicating "mixed or average" reviews. IndieWire reviewer Katie Walsh gave strong praise to Silverman's performance in the film.

=== Accolades ===
Silverman was nominated for Screen Actors Guild Award for Outstanding Performance by a Female Actor in a Leading Role at the 22nd Screen Actors Guild Awards.

Year	Award	Category	Recipients	Result
2016	Washington DC Area Film Critics Association Awards	Best Actress	Sarah Silverman	Nominated
2016	Screen Actors Guild Award	Outstanding Performance by a Female Actor in a Leading Role	Sarah Silverman	Nominated
