= Pat Rocco =

American filmmaker and activist (1934–2018)

- Born: Pasquale Vincent Serrapica; February 9, 1934; Brooklyn, New York, U.S.
- Died: November 8, 2018 (aged 84); Palm Springs, California, U.S.
- Known for: Softcore gay films

Pat Rocco – born Pasquale Vincent Serrapica – (February 9, 1934 – November 8, 2018) was an American filmmaker and activist. He is known for producing popular romantic softcore gay short films and documentaries beginning in the late 1960s, and advocating for LGBTQ rights. He is sometimes credited (inaccurately) as the first filmmaker to include a scene of two men kissing in a film released to the public, in his 1968 short "A Very Special Friend". Playboy magazine referred to him as "King of the Nudies".

== Biography ==
Pasquale Vincent Serrapica was born in 1934 in Brooklyn, New York. His family moved to California in 1945, where he sang on Pasadena radio station KWKW. He recorded a number of singles and albums in the 1950s under the name Pat Rocco; he legally changed his name in 1966. He toured with Marge and Gower Champion and appeared on the Tennessee Ernie Ford Show.

Rocco was openly gay in this teens, and graduated from Monrovia-Arcadia-Duarte High School with a tutor following a scandal involving a teacher. He owned Bizarre Bazaar, a Hollywood head shop, in the mid 1960s. He took a job photographing male nude models for an alternative newspaper, which led to filming motion pictures, and a successful mail-order business selling nude erotic photos and films. Unlike the semi-nude male shorts already being produced by Bob Mizer and a few others, Rocco's softcore erotic films focused on storytelling, with romantic plots and scenes filmed on location. "Disneyland Discovery" (1969) was filmed primarily at the titular theme park, with a nude lovemaking scene – purportedly on Tom Sawyer's Island – filmed elsewhere. (Rocco was subsequently banned from the park.) Collections of his films became popular regular features at the Park Theatre and Century Theater in Los Angeles, sometimes out-grossing mainstream films for the day. However, as hardcore pornography became legal and more popular than this style of film, Rocco stopped making them.

Rocco continued to film events related to the gay community in Los Angeles, such as protests outside a restaurant that refused to serve gay customers, speeches by political martyr Harvey Milk, and the first Los Angeles Pride parade in 1970, which he helped organize. He ran Hudson House, which provided emergency housing and job training for LGBTQ people in Los Angeles, San Diego, San Francisco, and Hawaii (where Rocco and his partner David Kirk Ghee moved in 1983).

Rocco is the subject of Pat Rocco Dared, a 2021 biographical documentary by Bob Christie and Morris Chapdelaine.
