= Intrusion (film) =

- Official release poster
- Directed by: Adam Salky
- Written by: Christopher Sparling
- Produced by: Kyle Benn; Josh Weinstock; Alexandra Milchan; Matthew Myers; Russell Hollander; Christopher Sparling
- Starring: Freida Pinto; Logan Marshall-Green
- Cinematography: Eric Lin
- Edited by: Ben Baudhuin
- Music by: Alex Heffes
- Production companies: Creator Media Entertainment; Sea Smoke Entertainment; EMJAG Productions
- Distributed by: Netflix
- Release date: September 22, 2021
- Running time: 92 minutes
- Country: United States
- Language: English

Intrusion is a 2021 American psychological thriller film directed by Adam Salky and written by Christopher Sparling, starring Freida Pinto and Logan Marshall-Green. It was released on September 22, 2021, by Netflix. It is about a couple who move from Boston to a small town in New Mexico to live a quieter life, only to find themselves the victims of a burglary and a deadly home invasion.

== Plot ==
Tired of the rat race in Boston, therapist Meera and her husband, architect Henry Parsons, have recently moved into an isolated, ultra-modern house in Corrales, New Mexico, which Henry designed and built. One evening, they find their house broken into, although the only items stolen are a laptop and their cell phones. A few days later, Meera is woken up by a rattling noise and finds the power out. Henry goes outside to check the generator and finds it destroyed. Spotting flashlight beams inside, he realizes the intruders have returned. He discovers Meera tied up inside the house and releases her. They try to escape, but are pursued by several masked men. Henry retrieves a handgun hidden in the house and the couple flee upstairs. Henry lowers Meera down to the ground and she gets to her car, but then she hears gunshots from inside the house. A wounded man staggers outside, followed by Henry, who shoots him.

At the police station, Meera argues with Henry about the gun, which he had kept secret from her. They are shown mugshots of the three intruders, members of a trailer park family with a history of crime. Two are dead, but one, Dylan Cobb, is in ICU at the local hospital. The couple is told that another family member, college student Christine Cobb, has recently gone missing, and that the trio is suspected to have been involved in her disappearance, which might go unsolved unless Cobb recovers. Meera, who has previously had breast cancer, is re-traumatized by the attack, but Henry tries to encourage her to put it behind them.

One night, Henry goes to the store, but forgets his wallet. When he doesn't answer his phone, Meera decides to catch up to him in her car, but he turns off towards the hospital instead of the store. Meera gets in a car accident before she can follow him. Back at the house, Henry claims it was just a wrong turn.

Meera borrows Henry's car to get to work and learns that the surviving intruder died the same night she saw Henry go towards the hospital. Suspicious, Meera finds the Cobb family's address in the GPS on Henry's car. Inside their trailer, she finds an envelope from Henry's construction company. She opens the family's mailbox and takes a video camera from inside. At home, Meera finds the camcorder is broken and won't play the tape, so she orders a new one. In Henry's office, she finds a USB drive with photos from the construction of their house, which show that Dylan Cobb worked on the house and that Christine Cobb visited the site.

Meera confronts Henry, who reveals that he was short of money for the house, and committed fraud in order to cover the balance. He says he fired Dylan after witnessing him mistreat Christine; Dylan was enraged and threatened to expose Henry. After he stopped paying Dylan to keep quiet, Dylan and the other Cobb men broke into the house for revenge. Meera is reassured by Henry's explanation and forgets about the videotape.

Soon after, they hold a housewarming party. She catches sight of a news report about Christine still being missing and decides to watch the tape after all on the new camcorder that was delivered to her office. On it, Dylan says he believes Henry was involved in Christine's disappearance. He describes going to Henry's house with his dog, which barked near Henry's office as if recognizing a scent.

In Henry's office, Meera discovers a hidden door to a secret basement. She finds Christine chained to a chair and realizes that the rattling sound in the house was her chains banging on the pipes. Henry arrives before Meera can free her, revealing that he has always felt homicidal urges. Meera realizes that Henry built their home to kidnap women and commit murder in it. She tries to phone for help, but Henry overpowers her and ties her up before going back upstairs to send the guests home. Meera manages to break free and release Christine. Henry returns to the basement as they are trying to escape, and a chase ensues. Henry knocks out Meera and drags Christine back downstairs. Just as he is about to kill her, Meera hits Henry in the head, killing him. She is later seen moving out of the now-empty house.

== Cast ==
- Freida Pinto as Meera Parsons
- Logan Marshall-Green as Henry Parsons
- Robert John Burke as Detective Stephen Morse
- Sarah Minnich as Joanne Waterston
- Yvette Fazio-Delaney as construction crew member / suspect
- Clint Obenchain as Clint Oxbow
- Mark Sivertsen as Dylan Cobb
- Megan Elisabeth Kelly as Christine Cobb
- Hayes Hargrove as Bill Whitman
- David DeLao as Lieutenant Henderson
- Brandon Root as Peter
- Josh Horton as sergeant
- Bonita King as cafe patron

== Production ==
The film was primarily shot in Corrales and Albuquerque, New Mexico.

== Reception ==
On Rotten Tomatoes, the film holds an approval rating of 23% based on 22 reviews, with an average rating of 4.5/10. On Metacritic, the film has a weighted average score of 39 out of 100, based on five critics, indicating "generally unfavorable" reviews.
