= Marcus H. Rosenmüller =

German film director and screenwriter (born 1973)

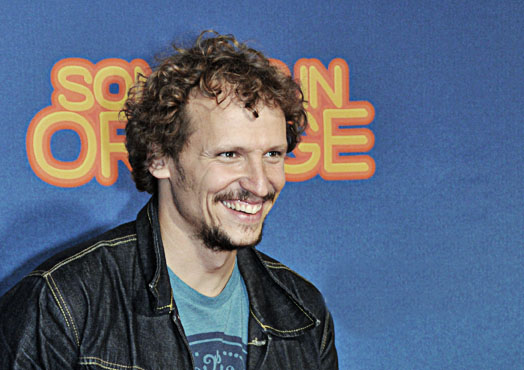
- Rosenmüller in 2011
- Born: 1973 (age 52–53); Tegernsee, Bavaria, West Germany
- Occupations: film director, screenwriter

Marcus H. Rosenmüller is a German film director and screenwriter. He wrote and directed the films Grave Decisions, Little White Lies and directed My Life in Orange, Heavyweights and The Best Place to Be.

== Selected filmography ==
- Grave Decisions (2006)
- Heavyweights (2006)
- Good Times (2007)
- The Best Place to Be (2008)
- Räuber Kneißl (2008)
- Little White Lies (2009)
- My Life in Orange (2011)
- Sommer der Gaukler (2011)
- Don't You Believe It! (2012)
- Beste Chance (2014)
- The Keeper (2018)
- Extrawurst (2026)
