= Jenny Elvers =

German actress

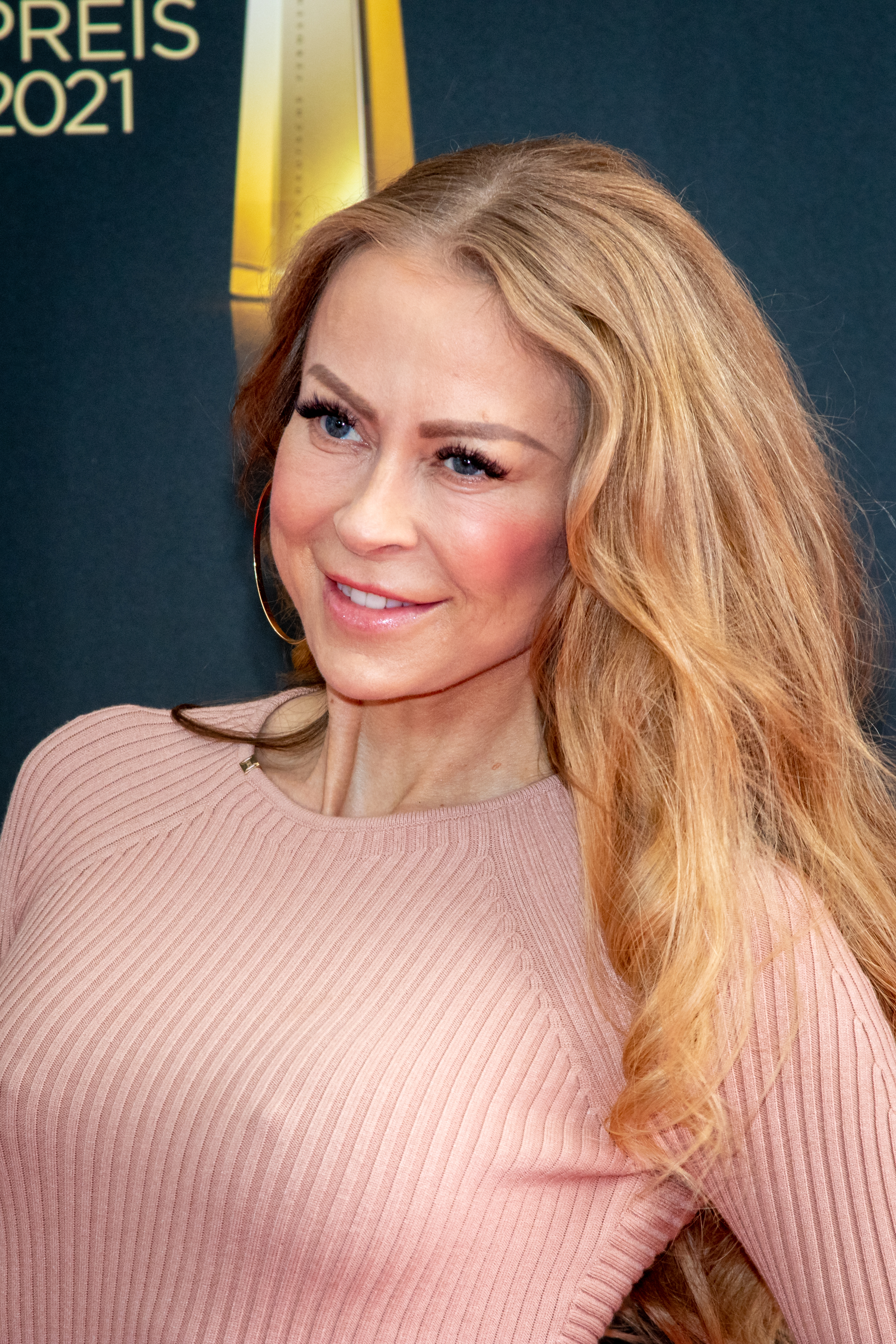
- Elvers in 2021
- Born: 11 May 1972 (age 53); Amelinghausen, West Germany
- Occupation: Actress

Jenny Elvers (pronounced [ˈd͡ʒe.ni ˈɛl.vɐs]], during her marriage from 2003 to 2013 Jenny Elvers-Elbertzhagen) (born 11 May 1972), is a German actress and television personality. She studied acting in Berlin, Hamburg and Chicago, and has worked as an actress and TV show presenter since the early 1990s. She was married to her agent.

== Filmography ==
- 1995: Jailbirds (directed by Detlev Buck)
- 1996: Knockin' on Heaven's Door (with Til Schweiger)
- 1994: Otto - Die Serie (with Otto Waalkes )
- 1995: Der Elefant vergißt nie (The Elephant Never Forgets, directed by Detlev Buck)
- 1996: Nikola
- 1998: Top of the Pops (the presenter)
- 2006: Tough Enough (directed by Detlev Buck)
- 2009: Kopf oder Zahl
- 2009: Löwenzahn
- 2009: Großstadtrevier
- 2009: Volcano
- 2009: Tierärztin Dr. Mertens
- 2009: All You Need Is Love – Meine Schwiegertochter ist ein Mann
- 2009: Leipzig Homicide
- 2010: Auch das noch
- 2011: Cologne P.D. - Playback
- 2011: Ein Fall für Zwei
- 2011: Notruf Hafenkante
- 2011: Der Kriminalist
- 2013: Küstenwache – Aus Mangel an Beweisen
- 2014: Frauenherzen
- 2015: Abschussfahrt
- 2015: Kartoffelsalat – Nicht fragen!
- 2015: SOKO 5113 - Opfer
- 2016: Böser Wolf
- 2016: SOKO Wismar - Tödliches Alibi
- 2016: Ich bin ein Star – Holt mich hier raus!
