= Moravian Sun Inn =

- U.S. National Register of Historic Places
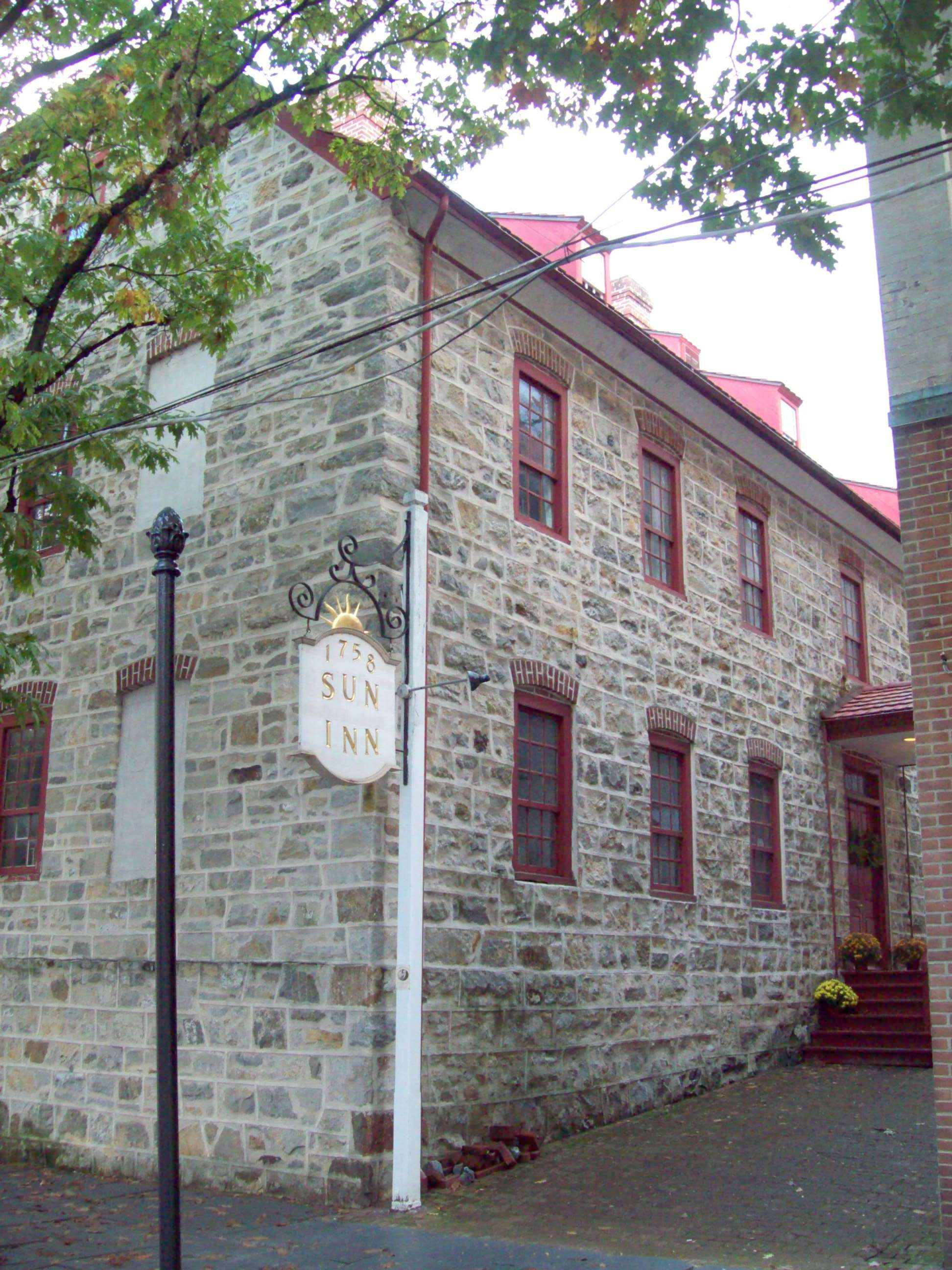
- Moravian Sun Inn, October 2011

- Location within Pennsylvania Location within the United States
- Location: 564 Main St., Bethlehem, Pennsylvania
- Coordinates: 40°37′19″N 75°22′54″W
- Area: less than one acre
- Built: 1758
- NRHP reference No.: 73001658
- Added to NRHP: October 2, 1973

The Moravian Sun Inn was an eighteenth-century inn that was built by the Moravian community in Bethlehem, Pennsylvania to provide accommodations for non-Moravian merchants who had business with the community.

It was listed on the National Register of Historic Places in 1973.

== History and architectural features ==
The Sun Inn received its first license from King George III. The original part of the building was built in 1758 as a 66-by-40-foot (20 by 12 m), two-story, stone building with a mansard roof.

At that time, the Moravian missionary community in Bethlehem was located on the western frontier of colonial America. As the Moravians' official "Gasthaus," this inn served many prominent guests including Governors John and Richard Penn, Governor William Franklin of New Jersey, Sir William Johnson, the British Commissioner of Indian Affairs, General Thomas Gage, the commander of British forces in America, and James Allen, the son of William Allen, the founder of Allentown, as well as many American patriots who were prominent in launching and supporting the American Revolution, including George Washington, Martha Washington, Alexander Hamilton, Benjamin Franklin, the Marquis de Lafayette, Governors John and Richard Penn, generals Greene and Knox, the Marquis de Chastellux, Horatio Gates, Benedict Arnold, Ethan Allen, Count Casimir Pulaski, Baron Von Steuben, Captain John Paul Jones, and John Jay.

On September 22, 1777, John Adams, Samuel Adams, Richard Henry Lee, John Hancock, and ten other members of the Continental Congress signed the register and stayed at the inn when the British occupied Philadelphia.

The inn also claims the distinction of having lodged fifty-one chiefs and warriors of the Iroquois Nation, including Chief Cornplanter, the Seneca leader and orator. It also acquired an international reputation for its hospitality and accommodations, fine food and was one of the first inns to offer a private suite. U.S. President John Adams reportedly described it as "the best Inn I ever saw."

After Washington's defeat at the Battle of Brandywine, much of the American army's baggage and stores were kept near the inn and many people fleeing Philadelphia stayed at the inn. During Fries's Rebellion in 1799, seventeen of Fries's followers were held at the inn and then freed by Fries.

In 1816, under the management of Christian Jacob Wolle a third story was added to the building with seventeen new rooms. In 1866, the building was enlarged again, almost completely hiding the original inn. More famous visitors arrived, including Joseph Bonaparte, brother of Napoleon, who was a guest at the inn during the summer of 1821. In 1836, General William Henry Harrison, who later became president of the United States, led a parade to the inn, where he addressed townspeople.

The Sun Inn ceased operations as a hotel in 1961, two hundred years after receiving its original license. To save the inn from deterioration and demolition, the Sun Inn Preservation Association was created in 1971 to raise funds and acquire the property. The inn was added to the National Register of Historic Places in 1978.

The Sun Inn has been restored to its original eighteenth-century appearance and is back in operation as a museum, restaurant, tavern, and micro-distillery.

== Gallery ==
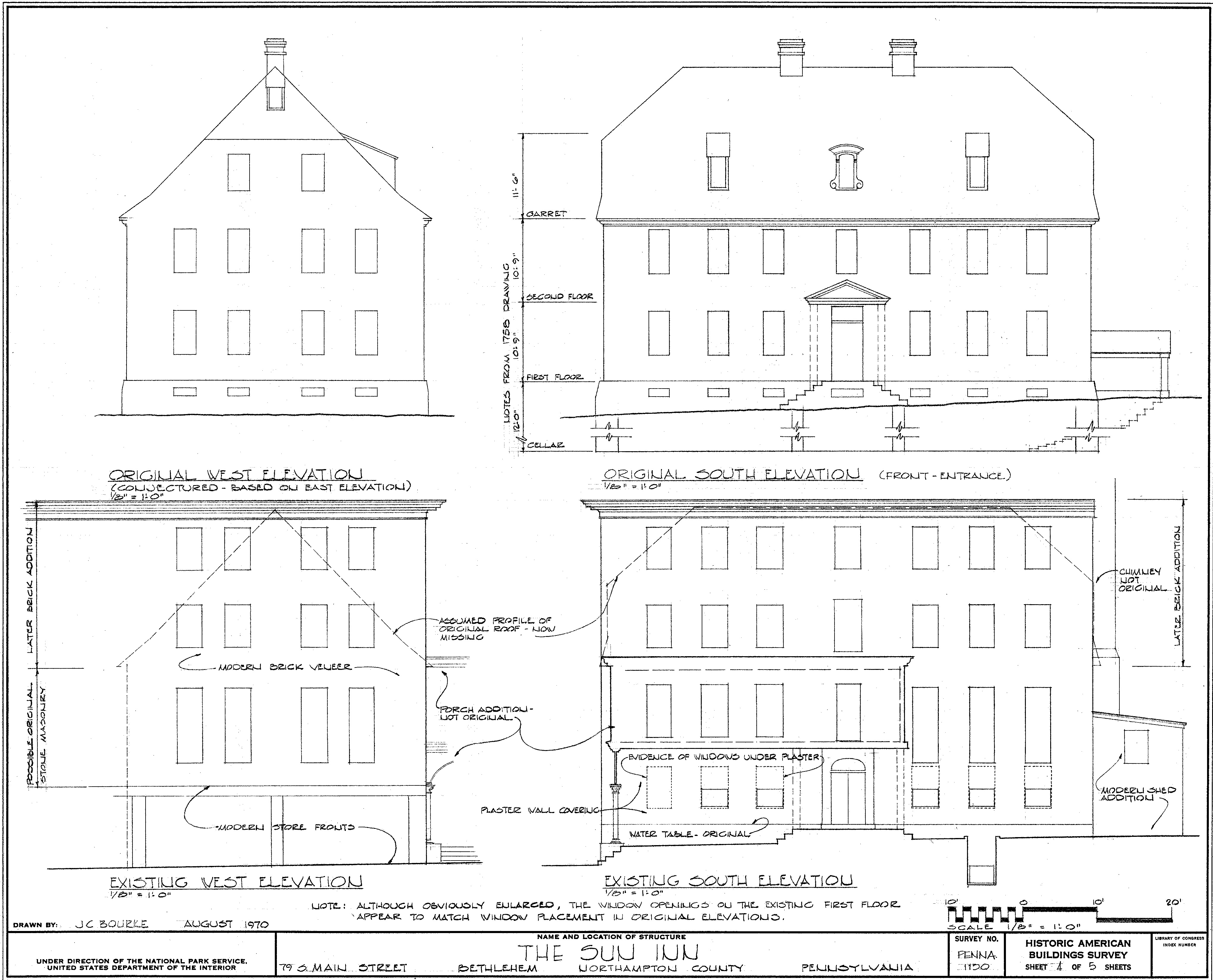
Original and 1866 elevations
