= Grave Decisions =

2006 film comedy film

- Directed by: Marcus H. Rosenmüller
- Starring: Markus Krojer; Fritz Karl
- Music by: Gerd Baumann
- Release date: 17 August 2006
- Running time: 100 minutes
- Country: Germany
- Language: Bavarian

Grave Decisions (German: Wer früher stirbt ist länger tot, literally The sooner you die, the longer you'll be dead) is a 2006 comedy directed by Marcus H. Rosenmüller which takes place in the fictitious Upper Bavarian village of Germringen.

The film is about an 11-year-old Bavarian boy (Sebastian Schneider) who feels responsible for his mother's death, who died during his birth, and naively attempts multiple ways to reach immortality (procreation, reincarnation, sanctification, rockstardom) to prevent his tenure in hell.

== Cast ==
- Markus Krojer as Sebastian Schneider
- Fritz Karl as Lorenz Schneider, Sebastian's father (a single father)
- Jule Ronstedt as Veronika Dorstreiter, teacher
- Jürgen Tonkel as Alfred Dorstreiter
- Saskia Vester as Frau Kramer
- Franz Xaver Brückner as Franz Schneider, Sebastian's brother
- Hans Schuler as Sepp Graudinger
- Sepp Schauer as Proske
- Pia Lautenbacher as Evi Kramer, Sebastian's classmate
- Klaus Steinbacher as Toni
