= The Keeper (2018 film) =

2018 film directed by Marcus H. Rosenmüller

- Film poster
- Directed by: Marcus H. Rosenmüller
- Written by: Marcus H. Rosenmüller; Nicholas J. Schofield; Robert Marciniak
- Produced by: Robert Marciniak; Chris Curling; Steve Milne
- Starring: David Kross; Freya Mavor
- Music by: Gerd Baumann
- Production companies: Zephyr Films; Lieblingsfilm
- Release dates: 1 October 2018 (Zurich); 14 March 2019 (Germany); 5 April 2019 (UK)
- Running time: 112 minutes
- Countries: United Kingdom; Germany
- Languages: English & German
- Budget: €11 million; (≃$13.4 million)
- Box office: $2.1 million

The Keeper (aka Trautmann) is a 2018 British-German biographical film directed by Marcus H. Rosenmüller and starring German actor David Kross as the footballer Bert Trautmann. Although the subject of the film was an athlete, the film has been described as "not primarily a sports film" but instead a drama.

The film premiered at the 2018 Zurich Film Festival, and was released in Germany under the title Trautmann on 14 March 2019. It was released in the UK and Ireland on 5 April 2019.

== Plot ==
In 1945, German paratrooper Bert Trautmann is captured while fighting in the forests near Kleve. Transferred to a British POW camp in Lancashire, he and his comrades are kept under strict conditions and made to work to repair the damage their country has caused to the surrounding area.

Jack Friar, a local tradesman and manager of non-league side St Helens Town, spots Trautmann keeping goal against other POWs during a trip to deliver treats to the camp commander and bribes the commander into allowing Trautmann to be allowed out of the camp, whereupon he recruits him to play as goalkeeper for his relegation-threatened side.

Although the war has recently ended with the defeat of Nazi Germany, the other players are angered to be asked to play with a German. With little other option they agree to take to the field. A string of strong performances see the players slowly come to accept Bert's place in the team. As a condition of his appearances, Friar agrees to let Bert help work in his shop. This leads Friar's daughter Margaret to soften her initially-hostile stance, and the pair begin an unlikely romance.

As St Helens Town come to their crunch relegation-deciding match at the end of the season, it is announced that the war's end has led to an offer for the German POWs to be repatriated. Although Trautmann is free to return to his home in Bremen, he chooses to stay to support his side. After the match, Manchester City manager Jock Thomson, who has come on a scouting mission, approaches Bert and offers him a place in his City team to replace the retiring Frank Swift. At their end-of-season party, his teammates present him with a hamper to take home to his family, but Bert's growing connection with Margaret leads him instead to stay and in due course they are married.

In 1949, Bert travels to Manchester to sign for City. The press conference for his arrival rapidly turns hostile as the Manchester press – representing a city with a large Jewish population – demand Bert answer questions on his military background. Protesting crowds form outside Maine Road and the City supporters barrage him with booing but Thomson and his City side refuse to join them, instead stating "there's no war in this dressing room".

At an acrimonious meeting with season ticket holders, Thomson and the City board struggle to contain the fury of the city's residents, but a passionate plea by Margaret strikes home with the influential Rabbi Altmann, who writes an open letter to the city published in a local paper asking them to examine all men individually without national bias. Following Altmann's letter, and with continuing fine performances on the field, the mood shifts and soon Trautmann is even being welcomed by players of other teams around the country.

By 1956 Bert and Margaret are living an idyllic existence with their young son John, while Manchester City's strong run has led them to the FA Cup Final. As City take a 3–1 lead, Bert is again winning plaudits for his masterful goalkeeping, when a dangerous collision with Birmingham City player Peter Murphy shatters a vertebra in his neck and almost costs him his life. With 20 minutes of the game left to go, and clearly in a bad state, Trautmann refuses to leave the field and continues to make several brave saves, stopping Birmingham City from scoring any further goals and thus winning City the cup.

Bert's joy leads to tragedy as during his recuperation his son is hit by a car and killed. Their heartbreak causes Margaret to grow more distant from him, while he himself becomes convinced that his loss is a karmic consequence of his inaction when witnessing war atrocities in Ukraine and the film leaves them still working through the resulting difficulties in their marriage.

As the film ends with footage of Trautmann's City career, overlaid text reveals that Trautmann played for Manchester City until 1964, was the first foreign recipient of the English Player of the Year title and was recognised by the British and German governments for his work in promoting Anglo-German relations.

== Cast ==
- David Kross as Bert Trautmann
- Freya Mavor as Margaret Friar
- John Henshaw as Jack Friar
- Dervla Kirwan as Clarice Friar
- Michael Socha as Bill Twist
- Harry Melling as Sergeant Smythe
- Gary Lewis as Jock Thomson
- Barbara Young as Grandma Sarah
- Julian Sands as Fred Tilson
- Dave Johns as Roberts
- Chloe Harris as Betsy
- Mikey Collins as Alf Myers
- Angus Barnett as Clive Thornton
- Stuart Donaghy as lead football team-mate
- Butz Ulrich Buse as Rabbi Altmann
- Tony Wright / VerseChorusVerse as Ice Cream Man

== Production ==
Before Trautmann's death in 2013, Rosenmüller and Marciniak spent several days interviewing him about details for inclusion in the film.

Principal photography began in Belfast on 8 June 2017.

== Release ==
The film premiered at the Zurich Film Festival on 1 October 2018, and was released in Germany under the title Trautmann on 14 March 2019. It was released in the UK on 5 April 2019.

== Reception ==
=== Box office ===
The Keeper grossed a worldwide total of $2.1 million, against a production budget of about $13.4 million.

=== Critical response ===
On review aggregator Rotten Tomatoes, the film holds an 87% approval rating based on 30 reviews, with an average rating of 6.4/10. The website's critics consensus reads: "The Keeper strays into easy sentimentality, but this fact-based drama's warm spirit makes its indulgences easy to forgive." On Metacritic, the film holds a weighted average score of 52 out of 100, based on 6 critics, indicating "mixed or average reviews".

=== Awards ===
Organisation	Award category	Recipient	Result
Bavarian Film Awards	Best Film		Won
Tiantan Film Awards	Best Supporting Actor	John Henshaw	Won
Gilde Film Awards	Youth Jury Prize		Won
San Francisco Jewish Film Festival	Audience Award		Won
Buenos Aires German Film Festival	Audience Award		Won
Dinard Film Festival	Hitchcock Audience Award		Won
Dinard Film Festival	Golden Hitchcock Award		Won
Gold Coast International Film Festival	Audience Award		Won
Philadelphia Jewish Film Festival	Audience Award for Best Narrative		Won
Jewish Film Festival of the Jewish Community Center Sonoma County	Audience Award Best Feature Film		Won

== See also ==
- List of association football films
