= Teeth (2007 film) =

- Theatrical release poster
- Directed by: Mitchell Lichtenstein
- Written by: Mitchell Lichtenstein
- Produced by: Joyce Pierpoline; Mitchell Lichtenstein
- Starring: Jess Weixler; John Hensley; Josh Pais; Hale Appleman; Ashley Springer; Lenny Von Dohlen
- Cinematography: Wolfgang Held
- Edited by: Joe Landauer
- Music by: Robert Miller
- Distributed by: Roadside Attractions
- Release dates: January 19, 2007 (Sundance); January 18, 2008 (United States)
- Running time: 94 minutes
- Country: United States
- Language: English
- Budget: $2 million
- Box office: $2.3 million

Teeth is a 2007 American comedy horror film written and directed by Mitchell Lichtenstein. The film stars Jess Weixler and was produced by Lichtenstein on a budget of $2 million. It premiered at the Sundance Film Festival on January 19, 2007, and received a limited release in the United States on January 18, 2008, by Roadside Attractions. Its title refers to the ancient trope of vagina dentata.

Teeth was positively received by critics and grossed $2,340,110 worldwide. At Sundance, Weixler received the Grand Jury Prize for Acting.

== Plot ==
As children, Dawn O'Keefe and her stepbrother Brad are playing in their backyard pool, whereupon Dawn bites his finger, causing permanent scarring. Years later, Dawn is now a teenage spokesperson for a Christian abstinence group, "The Promise". She frequently overhears her stepbrother Brad and his girlfriend Melanie arguing about his refusal to engage in vaginal intercourse, insisting on only having anal sex.

One afternoon at a group meeting, Dawn is introduced to Tobey. Dawn, her friends Gwen and Phil, and Tobey begin going out as a group. Though Dawn and Tobey are attracted to each other, they initially agree they should not spend time alone together. However, they later give in and meet at a local swimming hole. After their swim, they enter a cave to get warm and begin kissing. Dawn becomes uncomfortable and tries to persuade Tobey to go back outside, but he becomes aggressive. When Dawn tries to push him off, he shakes her, smacking her head on the ground and dazing her. Tobey attempts to rape her, but her vagina 'cuts' Tobey's penis as it enters, causing him to bleed and fall down the waters and die. A horrified Dawn flees the scene.

After a Promise meeting, Dawn runs into her classmate Ryan at a dance. He drops her off at her home and asks her out on a date, but she declines. Dawn returns to the swimming hole and screams in horror when she sees a crab crawling on Tobey's severed penis. She drops her purity ring off a cliff. She then researches vagina dentata and realizes she may have it. She visits a gynecologist, Dr. Godfrey, but he assaults her during the examination, reaching up inside her without a glove. She panics and her vagina bites off four fingers on his right hand. On her way home, she sees several police vehicles passing her, as well as a car that resembles Tobey's. That evening, she returns to the pool to investigate. When she arrives, the police are bringing up Tobey's body. Dawn returns home to find her ailing mother, Kim, unconscious on the floor while Brad and Melanie are in his room having sex. Kim is taken to the hospital.

Hysterical, Dawn goes to Ryan seeking help. Ryan gives her a sedative and stimulates her with a vibrator. Though initially afraid she will hurt him, she finds that when she is relaxed and consenting, her "teeth" do not engage. The following morning, they have sex again, but during intercourse, Ryan's friend calls. Ryan smugly boasts that he had made a bet with the friend that he could goad Dawn into sex. In her anger, her vagina bites off his penis and she leaves as he screams in agony.

Dawn's stepfather Bill attempts to throw Brad out of the house, but Brad sets his pet Rottweiler on Bill, confessing his love for Dawn. Dawn meets Bill and Melanie at the hospital after her mother has died. Seeing her stepfather injured and hearing from Melanie how Brad told her to ignore her mother's cries for help, Dawn becomes emboldened by her power and goes home to seek revenge. She applies make-up and goes to Brad's room to seduce him. In the midst of the act, Brad recalls the incident from their childhood, but finally realizes that it was not her mouth that bit him. As he realizes this, Dawn's vagina bites off his penis. She drops it on the ground and although Brad calls his dog to attack her, the animal instead eats the penis, spitting out the pierced glans. Dawn leaves despite his pleas for her to stay.

Dawn cycles away from home, but her bicycle tire sustains a puncture, prompting her to hitchhike. She accepts a lift from an old man but falls asleep and wakes up after nightfall outside a convenience store. When she tries to exit his car, he repeatedly locks the doors while licking his lips. Dawn hesitates, then turns to the old man with a mischievous smile.

== Cast ==
- Jess Weixler as Dawn O'Keefe
  - Ava Ryen Plumb as young Dawn
- John Hensley as Brad
  - Hunter Ulvog as young Brad
- Josh Pais as Dr. Godfrey
- Hale Appleman as Tobey
- Lenny Von Dohlen as Bill
- Vivienne Benesch as Kim
- Ashley Springer as Ryan
- Julia Garro as Gwen
- Nicole Swahn as Melanie
- Adam Wagner as Phil
- Trent Moore as Mr. Vincent
- Doyle Carter as the old man

== Critical reception ==
The film received mostly positive reviews from critics. On review aggregator Rotten Tomatoes, the film has an approval rating of 81% based on 72 reviews, with an average score of 6.5/10. The site's critical consensus reads: "Smart, original, and horrifically funny, Teeth puts a fresh feminist spin on horror movie tropes." On Metacritic, the film received a score of 57/100 based on 22 reviews, indicating "mixed or average reviews".

Mystelle Brabbée, the Sundance Film Festival's artistic director, said it was "one of the most talked-about films at the Sundance Film Festival this year". Jess Weixler won the Special Jury Prize for Dramatic Performance (and tied with Tamara Podemski from the film Four Sheets to the Wind).

== Musical adaptation ==
A musical adaptation by Anna K. Jacobs and Michael R. Jackson premiered February 21, 2024 at Playwrights Horizons.
