= Ashley Springer =

American actor

- Education: Tisch School of the Arts
- Occupation: Actor
- Known for: Teeth, The Wolf of Wall Street

Ashley Springer is an American actor who is best known for his role in the 2007 American horror comedy Teeth, written and directed by Mitchell Lichtenstein. His other films include Dare, The Visitor, and The Wolf of Wall Street.

Springer attended Stuyvesant High School. In 2015, he produced and acted in The Impossibilities, which was nominated for a Gotham Award in the category of Breakthrough Short-Form Series.

== Filmography ==
=== Film ===
Year	Title	Role	Notes
2007	Teeth	Ryan	
2007	The Visitor	Student	
2007	Anamorph	Jeff Sarno	
2007	The Secret	Ian	
2008	Assassination of a High School President	White Kid With Dreadlocks	
2009	Dare	Ben Berger	
2011	Downtown Express	Arkady	
2011	Losers Take All	Miles	
2012	A Wife Alone	Park	
2013	Dan Is Missing	Nick Phillips	
2013	The Wolf of Wall Street	Job Applicant #1	
2015	Chloe and Theo	Tyler	
2016	The Creek When He Came Back	Danny	

=== Television ===
Year	Title	Role	Notes
2009	Circledrawers	Moses	Television film
2009	Important Things with Demetri Martin	Student No. 3	Episode: "Safety"
2010	Nurse Jackie	George	Episode: "What the Day Brings"
2015	The Impossibilities	Harry	7 episodes
2016	Younger	Jasper	Episode: "Into the Woods & Out of the Woods"
