= All You Need Is Love: Meine Schwiegertochter ist ein Mann =

- Written by: Kerstin Österlin; Jessica Schellack
- Directed by: Edzard Onneken
- Starring: Saskia Vester; Jürgen Tonkel; Andreas Helgi Schmid; Jenny Elvers; Manuel Witting; Franziska Taub; Johannes Herrschmann
- Theme music composer: Michael Kadelbach
- Country of origin: Germany
- Original language: German

Production
- Producers: Frank Kaminski; Anna Karlstedt; Ulrich Stiehm
- Cinematography: Marco Uggiano
- Editor: Dietrich Toellner
- Running time: 94 minutes

Original release
- Network: Sat.1
- Release: 3 November 2009

All You Need Is Love: Meine Schwiegertochter ist ein Mann (English: My Daughter-In-Law Is A Man) is a German romantic comedy television film which first aired on November 3, 2009, on the German channel Sat.1.

The film deals with a young man who has sent news of his upcoming nuptials and his plans to get married in his hometown to his parents and the people of hometown he speaks of. However, the woman they think he is going to bring with him is actually a man.

== Plot ==
In an Alpine village in Bavaria, divorcee Katharina Remminger lives alone. Her husband had long ago left her for another woman, and her only son Hans lives in Berlin where he studies architecture. She receives a letter from her son Hans one day, informing her that he is engaged and wants to get married in his home town, and that he and his fiancé Nicki will be visiting in the upcoming week. Having never heard or even seen a picture of Nicki, Katharina assumes that it's a female name and becomes elated at the thought of her son getting married and that she should one day become a grandmother, and in her excitement tells the whole town of Hans' news, and soon the town is abuzz about the upcoming nuptials.

When Hans and Nicki arrive at Katharina's doorstep however, Katharina is shocked to say the least. She has never had to deal with homosexuality before and isn't quite sure how to. She lets them in, but after a neighbor who sees Hans comes in asking where the bride to be is, Katharina tells her that Nicki is the best man, and that the bride is sick and stayed in Berlin. When the neighbor leaves, Hans argues with his mother which leads to Katharina kicking them out of her house. It's Hans' dream to get married in his hometown however, so with Nicki's support they decide to stay and check into a hotel until they can come up with a plan to bring Hans' mother to her senses and still get married in Hans' hometown.

In the meantime, Hans shows Nicki around town, which leads to a local spotting the couple kissing while out on the lake. Soon news of Hans being gay becomes the talk of the town, and the prejudices of the citizens begins to show.

When Hans runs into his estranged father, Christian who is an auto dealer, he informs him of his homosexuality to which Christian doesn't react well and simply walks away. Christian tells his second wife Vera about Hans' news, and she is shocked and then worried because Christian is about to open a second car dealership, and she is worried that his having a gay son will keep customers away.

More obstacles come and go, Katharina's friends avoid her and she has been kicked off the church choir, and Christian's friends constantly make gay jokes behind his back and in front of him, and when Hans shows Nicki the place he wants to get married at, an old friend gets into a fight with him which leads to a large brawl in which almost everyone comes out bruised. This drives NIcki to give up and go back to Berlin.

Things begin to look all right for Hans and his relationship with his parents however. Slowly they are beginning to accept him and his orientation. However they eventually get into another argument because they said that Hans was being unfair to them by never telling them about his homosexuality and then just showing up and expecting them to be 100% ok with everything.

Soon after this, Hans also returns to Berlin, and they believe that it was because of that argument. However it soon comes out that Christian's second wife Vera, had been spreading a rumor that Hans was not Christian's biological son, and that he only ever said that he was to protect Katharina's honor. Hans had heard this rumor and this is what had driven him to leave.

It is only sometime afterward at the opening of Christian's second auto dealership that he hears of the rumor, and makes an announcement telling everyone that despite what he had heard he is Hans' birth father. He then goes to Katharina (who had also just learned of the rumor and went to confront him about it) and apologizes, telling her it was Vera who started the lie. Vera then begins arguing with them both. Furious, Kathrina punches Vera, and Katharina and Christian drive to Berlin together to talk to Hans.

They meet and apologize for everything, and tell the couple that they have their support and that they would host a wedding for them. And they do indeed, getting everyone who previously were against them (except Vera) to show up and give Hans the wedding he always wanted. The events of the film also brought Christian and Katharina back together again, so the ending is especially happy for Hans. The movie then ends with the very same church choir that temporarily kicked off Kathrina, giving a surprise performance of "All You Need Is Love" by The Beatles.

== Cast ==
- Saskia Vester as Katharina Remminger
- Helgi Schmid as Hans Remminger
- Manuel Witting as Nicki
- Jürgen Tonkel as Christian Remminger
- Jenny Elvers as Vera Remminger
- Franziska Traub as Rosi
- Johanness Herrschmann as Alois

== Production ==
Production took place between April 28, 2009, and May 28, 2009. The film was shot in the cities of Bad Bayersoien and Munich, of the Bavaria region of Germany.

=== Music ===
The original music in the film was composed by Michael Kadelbach. The film soundtrack includes a performance of The Beatles "All You Need Is Love" performed by Franziska Taub, and features many other uncredited songs such as:

- "Valerie" by Mark Ronson featuring Amy Winehouse
- "Wise Up" by Aimee Mann
- "Dream a Little Dream of Me" by The Mamas and the Papas
- "Serious" by Richard Hawley
- "Don't Break My Heart" by Kate Walsh
- "Don't Get Me Wrong" by The Pretenders
- "Fever" by Elvis Presley
- "Breakable" by Ingrid Michaelson
- "Insensatez" by Antonio Carlos Jobim
- "Heartbeats" by José González

== See also ==
- List of lesbian, gay, bisexual or transgender-related films
- Homosexuality
