= Otto – Die Serie =

- Starring: Otto Waalkes
- Country of origin: Germany

Otto – Die Serie is a German television series.

== See also ==
- List of German television series
