= Dare (film) =

2009 American romantic drama film

- Promotional film poster
- Directed by: Adam Salky
- Written by: David Brind
- Produced by: Jason Orans; Mary Jane Skalski
- Starring: Emmy Rossum; Zach Gilford; Ashley Springer; Sandra Bernhard
- Cinematography: Michael Fimognari
- Distributed by: Image Entertainment
- Release dates: July 19, 2009 (Outfest Film Festival); November 13, 2009 (United States)
- Running time: 91 minutes
- Country: United States
- Language: English

Dare is a 2009 American romantic drama film directed by Adam Salky and written by David Brind. The film is based on Salky's 2005 short film which was met with acclaim at film festivals. The feature-length version, which premiered at the Sundance Film Festival, stars Emmy Rossum in a story about how "three very different teenagers discover that, even in the safe world of a suburban prep school, no one is who she or he appears to be." The film has been described as a cross between Pretty in Pink and Cruel Intentions.

== Cast ==
- Emmy Rossum as Alexa Walker
- Zach Gilford as Johnny Drake
- Ashley Springer as Ben Berger
- Ana Gasteyer as Ruth Berger
- Rooney Mara as Courtney
- Sandra Bernhard as Dr. Serena Mohr
- Alan Cumming as Grant Matson
- Cady Huffman as Dr. Kolton
- Wayne Pyle as Alan Berger
- Brianne Berkson as Gabby
- Chris Riggi as Josh
- Brea Bee as Mel Drake
- Lucy McMichael as Ms. Davis
- Luka Apt as a student

== Production ==
In 2003, David Brind and Adam Salky were classmates in the Graduate Film Program at Columbia University in New York. Their first-year assignment was to pair up to create an 8–12 minute short film—the caveat being that one could not direct one's own script. Adam took his own personal dare when he went out of his comfort zone to take on David's story of two very different high school boys who come unexpectedly together one night in a confluence of champagne, a swimming pool and adolescent bravado. The short film starred Michael Cassidy as Johnny and Adam Fleming as Ben and took a successful run in many film festivals in 2005.

== Development ==
Originally conceived as a short film, Dare garnered significant attention at film festivals, which demonstrated a strong audience interest in its portrayal of teenage sexual exploration. The positive reception and unresolved tension of the short directly paved the way for director Adam Salky to expand the story into a full-length feature film released in 2009.

== Reception ==
As of April 2025, the film holds a 59% approval rating on Rotten Tomatoes, based on 22 reviews with an average rating of 5.26/10.

Dare was listed as one of the "best films of 2009" in Newsday by movie critic Rafer Guzman. He wrote, "This little-seen movie stars Ashley Springer, Emmy Rossum and Zach Gilford - all delivering top-notch performances - as three high-schoolers whose wobbly psyches collide. One of the smartest and most honest teen movies in years."

A.O. Scott of The New York Times wrote, "Dare, written by David Brind, directed by Adam Salky and based on their short film of the same title, stakes out familiar territory and, true to its name, strikes out in some risky new directions. This high school semi-romance, which blends comic and tearful moods, is at once more provocative and more contemplative than most of its big-screen counterparts."

James Greenberg of The Hollywood Reporter wrote, "Dare, a smart and well-observed entry in the genre, is a cut above the usual hijinks. What elevates Dare above the usual high school fare is the quality of the writing by David Brind, crisp direction by Adam Salky and a uniformly attractive and compelling cast led by the delightful Emmy Rossum"

Gerrick Kennedy of the Los Angeles Times wrote, "With its dark, hyper-sexualization of teens, it offers an engrossing if not soap opera-esque tale of self-discovery."

Stina Chyn of Film Threat gave Dare four stars, writing, "What might otherwise be an exercise in ordinary adolescent stories turns powerfully intimate through the wonderful performances that Salky coaxes out from the cast."

Owen Gleiberman of Entertainment Weekly wrote, "Dare, a sweetly sexed-up high school triangle movie, is like a John Hughes comedy trying to pass itself off as transgressive" and gave it a C+ rating.

Emmy Rossum won the Young Hollywood Award at the Savannah Film Festival, because of her acting performance in Dare.

== Sequel ==
In 2017, David Brind and Adam Salky started a Kickstarter campaign for a sequel to the original short film, with Cassidy and Fleming reprising their roles. Launching the campaign in August, asking for $30,000, by September the film had been backed by over 200 backers and resulted in a total funding of approximately $32,000. Filming began on December 22, 2017, in Los Angeles, with the film wrapping on December 26, 2017. The Dare Project premiered at the Frameline Film Festival on June 15, 2018.
