= Adam Salky =

American film director

Adam Salky (born 1978) is an American television and film director. He is also a discipline head in film directing at the American Film Institute. His debut film as a director was the romantic drama Dare (2009).

== Early life and education ==
He was raised in New York City, and he cites the diverse population and "frenetic cityscape" as an important influence. He graduated with a Bachelor's degree from Emory University. He did an MFA at Columbia University in the film division. During his studies at Columbia University, he directed several short films which won awards, and he received the James Bridges Award.

== Career ==
His feature film debut as a director was Dare, a 2009 romantic drama film written by David Brind. It premiered at the Sundance Film Festival and then garnered a positive response at other film festivals. In 2015, he directed I Smile Back, starring Sarah Silverman, based on the 2008 novel of the same name by Amy Koppelman, who wrote the screenplay with Paige Dylan. The film is about an upper-middle-class wife and mother struggling with mental illness and addiction. It premiered at the 2015 Sundance Film Festival. In 2021 he directed the film Intrusion, starring Freida Pinto and Logan Marshall-Green.

In 2016, Salky was chosen to participate in Warner Bros. Television Directors’ Workshop. He directed three episodes of NBC’s TV show Blindspot.

Salky worked as an advisor at Sundance Institute's Sundance Labs program. He has worked as a guest lecturer at Columbia University and University of Southern California, teaching film direction. He has also given guest lectures to high school students on film directing.
