= Bob Christie (film director) =

Canadian documentary film director

- Born: Vancouver, British Columbia, Canada
- Occupations: Film director, producer, screenwriter
- Years active: 1995–present

Bob Christie is a Canadian documentary film director from Vancouver, British Columbia, Canada. He is best known for the 2009 documentary Beyond Gay: The Politics of Pride, which he directed, co-wrote and co-produced.

== Career ==
Christie studied at Simon Fraser University graduating in 1997 with a Bachelor of Fine Arts in film. He won three production scholarships during his studies, and his films, one drama and one documentary, were accepted to the national student competitions at the Montreal World Film Festival in 1995 with The Other Thing, and in 1997 with Auntie Culture.

After graduation, Christie worked in television commercial production coordinating, managing or producing over a hundred television spots. He also worked for a number of independent documentaries, short films and music videos. He also helped in co-producing many gay events such as Whistler Gay Ski Week, AIDS Walk, and Vancouver Pride and starting 2002, he directed and edited video installations, corporate, promotional and music videos.

In 2006 Christie began production on The Royal Eight, a one-hour documentary about his father's family. It was awarded completion funds from the National Film Board of Canada and was released in early 2009.

Beyond Gay: The Politics of Pride premiered at the Image+Nation film festival in 2009.

== Filmography ==
- 2008: The Royal Eight
- 2009: Beyond Gay: The Politics of Pride - director, co-writer, co-producer
- 2010: Out at the Games
- 2021: Pat Rocco Dared
