= Christian Jacob Wolle =

North American plant collector and innkeeper

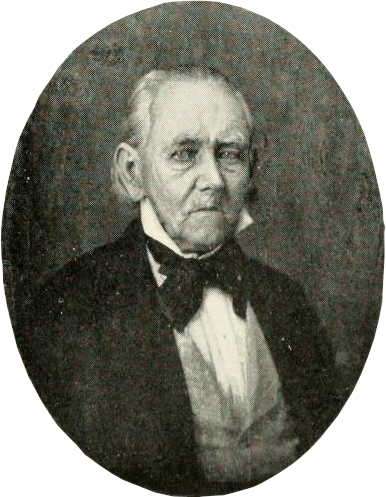
- Born: 1788
- Died: 1863 (aged 74–75)
- Scientific career
- Fields: Botany.

Signature
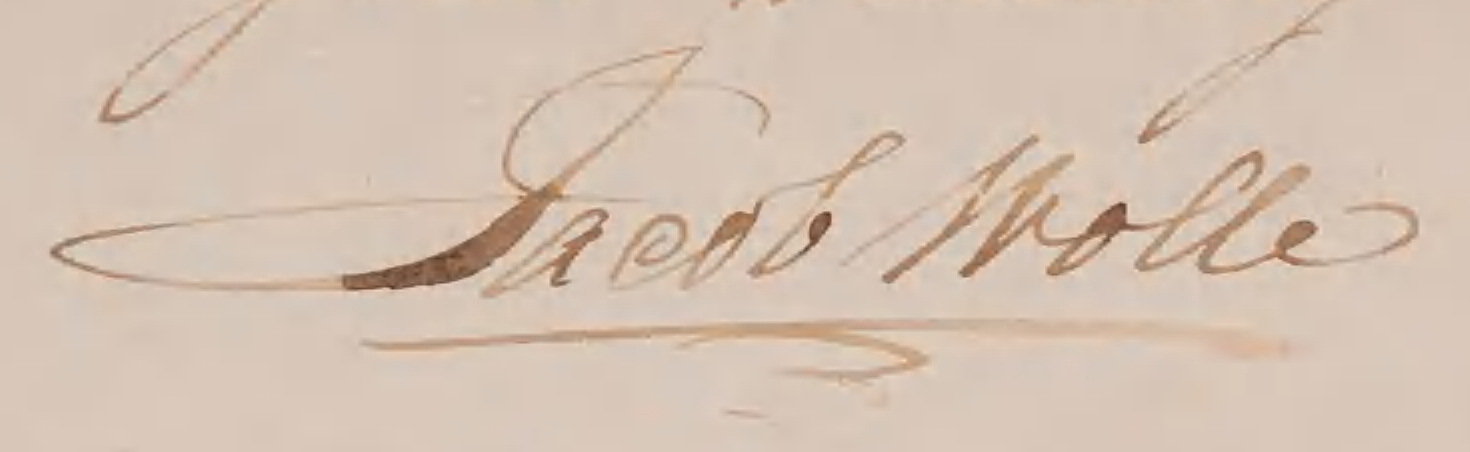

Christian Jacob Wolle, better known as Jacob Wolle (1788 – 1863) was a plant collector, botanist, and innkeeper of the Moravian Sun Inn in Bethlehem, Pennsylvania.

== Life ==
In 1816, Wolle married Mary Magdalene Luch (1797–1817), and they later went on to have a daughter called Louisa Arabella. He remarried in 1819, to Eliza Horsfield (1792-1867).

Also in 1816, he became the innkeeper of the Moravian Sun Inn in Bethlehem, Pennsylvania, and undertook renovations and an expansion of the premises, including adding a third floor. In 1824 Jacob became a justice of the peace and notary public. He retired from innkeeping in 1827. Jacob was also an accomplished bassoon player.

== Major works ==
- John G. Kummer. 1839. Catalogue of Botanical Specimens collected by J. WOLLE and A. L. HUEBENER, during the year 1837, in the vicinity of Bethlehem and other parts of Northampton County, Pennsylvania, in the order as they were found in bloom. American Journal of Science and Arts. 37:310–320.

== Botanical legacy ==
While Wolle primarily collected around Bethlehem, he also collected in southern Pennsylvania and New Jersey.

Wolle's approximate 30,000-specimen herbarium today form a significant part of the Carnegie Museum of Natural History in Pittsburgh, Pennsylvania, and the Academy of Natural Sciences of Drexel University. Specimens are also held by the Harvard University herbarium. Outside of North America specimens are held by the National Herbarium of Victoria Royal Botanic Gardens Victoria.
