= Arno Wolle =

Danish naturopath and mathematician

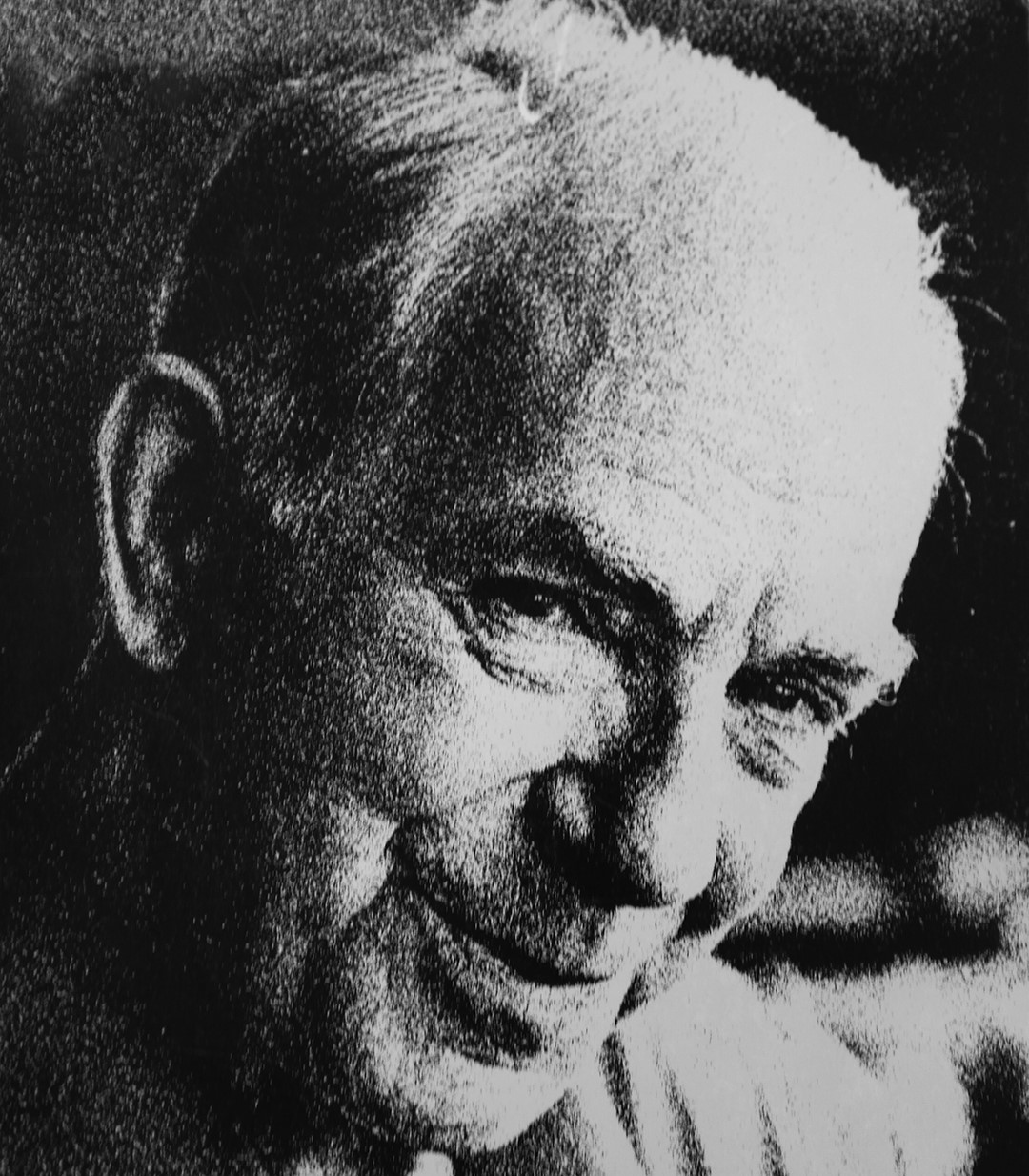
- Wolle in 1947
- Born: Arno Wolle; 24 February 1903; Copenhagen, Denmark
- Died: 2 July 1988 (aged 85); County Wicklow, Ireland
- Occupations: Naturopath and Mathematician
- Years active: 1920-1979

Arno Wolle (24 February 1903 in Copenhagen, Denmark – 2 July 1988 in County Wicklow, Ireland) was a Danish naturopath and mathematician.

== Biography ==
Wolle worked as a mathematician at the Danish Department of Defense and later at the Ministry of Finance. He is primarily known for the herbal blends that he developed. His works about herbal blends involved observation and examination of medicinal plants and their usages. In the course of his work, he created more than 100 herbal mixtures. These mixtures were subsequently distributed in Denmark via reform houses and drugstores. Wolle became a known alternative practitioner after Danish newspaper BT claimed in a report about his herbal medicines having the ability to cure many diseases. Consequently, it was reported that his telephone number, 114 in Kattinge went broken as many started to try to reach him. It was also reported that, during the peak of his practice, he used to visit 30 to 40 patients per day. Journalist Tabita Wulff in A Swedish newspaper addressed him as the 'Herb King of The North'. Furthermore, a song about him and his achievements was played in the Danish hit parade.

== Death and legacy ==
Wolle died on 2 July 1988 in Newtownmountkennedy in County Wicklow, Ireland. Wolle’s therapy was very popular among his patients during his lifetime but has not been scientifically recognized so far. In 1994, Finn Jensen Smed at Rask Molle Animal Hospital, Jutland, carried out a trial on the animal diseases, where a bunch of dogs who couldn't be treated with traditional medicines, were treated with the herbal mixtures of Wolle and the results were examined to judge the effectiveness.

== Bibliography ==
- Arno Wolle; Jørgen Munkebo, Bogen om Arno Wolle, ISBN 9788785214027
- Wulff, Tabita. Naturens apotek - ifølge Arno Wolle. Denmark: Alternatur, (n.d.).
- Jørgen Munkebo: Bogen om Arno Wolle. Naturforlaget, 1975. ISBN 9788785214027
- Jørgen Juhldahl: Arno Wolle’s Nature Medicine. Praxis Verlag, 1981, ISBN 8798085832
- Healing by Hand: Manual Medicine and Bonesetting in Global Perspective. United States: AltaMira Press, 2004.
