= Freunde fürs Leben =

Television series

- Country of origin: Germany

Freunde fürs Leben is a German television series.

== See also ==
- List of German television series
