= Beyond Gay: The Politics of Pride =

- Theatrical release poster
- Directed by: Bob Christie
- Written by: Bob Christie; Aerlyn Weissman
- Produced by: Morris Chapdelaine; Bob Christie
- Cinematography: Joshua Rainhard
- Edited by: Steve Schmidt
- Music by: Michael Wiskar
- Release date: October 25, 2009 (Image+Nation)
- Running time: 85 minutes
- Country: Canada
- Language: English

Beyond Gay: The Politics of Pride is a 2009 documentary directed by Bob Christie, where he examines relevance of LGBT pride celebrations internationally, against the backdrop of opposition to such events in a number of countries. The documentary tries to portray pride as more than just a parade, but rather an important step on the road to equality and fight against homophobia and discrimination. It was produced with Transmission in association with Border2Border Entertainment and Nomadic Pictures.

== Synopsis ==
Over the course of a year, the film follows Vancouver Pride Society president Ken Coolen to various international Pride events, including Poland, Hungary, Russia, Sri Lanka and others where there is great opposition to pride parades. In North America, Pride is complicated by commercialization and a sense that the festivals are turning away from their political roots toward tourism, party promotion and entertainment. Christie documents the ways larger, more mainstream Pride events have supported the global Pride movement and how human rights components are being added to more established events. In the New York sequence, leaders organize an alternative Pride parade, the Drag March, set up to protest the corporatization of New York Pride. A parade in São Paulo, the world's largest Pride festival, itself includes a completely empty float, meant to symbolize all those lost to HIV and to anti-gay violence.

== Appearances ==
A number of personalities appear in interviews for the documentary including:<

- Ken Coolen – Parade Director, Vancouver Pride Society
- Gilbert Baker – Creator of the GLBT Rainbow flag
- Sahran Abeysundara – Director of Equal Ground Sri Lanka
- Tomasz Baczkowski – President, Warsaw Equality Parade
- Dean Nelson – Director, Vancouver Pride Society
- Libby Davies – Member of Parliament, Vancouver East
- Fatima Amarshi – Executive Director, Pride Toronto
- Scott Long – Human Rights Watch
- Rev. Brent Hawkes – Metropolitan Church of Toronto
- Gareth Henry – J-FLAG Jamaica
- Franco Reinado – President, Gay & Lesbian Travel Assoc of Brazil
- Nikolai Alekseev – Founder, Moscow Pride
- Cleve Jones – Creator of Names Project Memorial Quilt, friend to Harvey Milk

== Events covered ==
The documentary shows footage of a number of parades including:

- InterPride 2007 (Zurich Switzerland) where Ken Coolen and parade co-director, Dean Nelson, attend an international conference of Pride organizations. Many human rights activists are interviewed, including American artist and activist Gilbert Baker, creator of the first rainbow flag.
- São Paulo Pride Parade (Brazil) where 4 million participants in a government-sponsored Pride with the theme of the year Homophobia Kills!
- Moscow Pride (Russia) with archiving clandestine preparations for this event and a violent counter protest
- Pride Colombo (Sri Lanka) where Pride events are only advertised after they take place, in order to protect the identities of those who attend. Meeting Sahran Abeysundra, who later travels to Canada to be a Grand Marshal in Vancouver Parade.
- Vancouver Pride (Canada) for the anniversary entitled Celebrating 30 Years of the Rainbow

== Awards ==
Morris Chapdelaine, Oliver-Barret Lindsay, Charlie David and Bob Christie

- 2009: Won Jury Award for Best Documentary at Image+Nation Festival in Montreal, Canada
- 2009: Won the Audience Award for "Documentary" category at Out on Film; Atlanta LGBT Film Festival.
- 2009: Won the Best Documentary Award at Fairy Tales International Gay & Lesbian Film Festival, Calgary Alberta
- 2009: Won the Best Documentary Award at Q Cinema, Fort Worth Texas
- 2009: Won the Best Documentary Award at Reel Pride, Winnipeg Manitoba
- 2009: Won the Jury Award for "Best Documentary Film" at Seattle Lesbian & Gay Film Festival
- 2009: Won the Audience Award for "Favorite Documentary" at Seattle Lesbian & Gay Film Festival
- 2010: Won the HBO Best Documentary Film Award at the Miami Gay & Lesbian Film Festival
- 2010: Won the "Best of the Festival" award at Indianapolis LGBT Film Festival

Others

- 2010: Michael Wiskar Nominated for "Best Musical Score in a Documentary Program or Series" at Leo Awards
- 2010: Steve Schmidt Nominated for "Best Picture Editing in a Documentary Program or Series" at Leo Awards
