= Nicolo Donato (film director) =

Danish film director

Nicolo Donato (born October 10, 1974) is a Danish film director.

He trained at various schools, including Testrup Højskole, two schools of photography, and the National Film School of Denmark; the latter included a master class with William Esper. Donato has worked on music videos for Danish rapper Clemens, Moi Caprice and The Raveonettes and has made several short films. His short film Togetherness (2006) was screened at the Cannes Film Festival, and was nominated at the Seoul International Film Festival for Best International Film.

Donato's 2009 feature film debut Broderskab (Brotherhood) won the Golden Marc'Aurelio Jury Award for Best Film at the 2009 International Rome Film Festival. He subsequently released Across the Waters (Fuglene Over Sundet), which follows a family of Danish Jews escaping Nazi Germany to Sweden in World War II.

== Filmography ==
- 2009 – Brotherhood (Broderskab)
- 2007 – Togetherness (television)
- 2005 – Min mors kærlighed (television)
- 2004 – Rød mand stå44 (television)
