= Franzi (TV series) =

German television series

- Country of origin: Germany

Franzi is a German television series.

== See also ==
- List of German television series
