= Der Schwammerlkönig =

- Starring: Wolfgang Fierek
- Country of origin: Germany

Der Schwammerlkönig is a German television series.

== See also ==
- List of German television series
