= K3 – Kripo Hamburg =

German television series

- Country of origin: Germany

K3 – Kripo Hamburg is a German television series.

== See also ==
- List of German television series
