= Die Verbrechen des Professor Capellari =

- Starring: Friedrich von Thun
- Country of origin: Germany

Die Verbrechen des Professor Capellari is a German television series.

== See also ==
- List of German television series
