= List of crime films =

This is a chronological list of crime films split by decade. Often there may be considerable overlap particularly between Crime and other genres (including, action, thriller, and drama films); the list should attempt to document films which are more closely related to crime, even if it bends genres.

== Films by decade ==
- List of crime films before 1930
- List of crime films of the 1930s
- List of crime films of the 1940s
- List of crime films of the 1950s
- List of crime films of the 1960s
- List of crime films of the 1970s
- List of crime films of the 1980s
- List of crime films of the 1990s
- 1990
- 1991
- 1992
- 1993
- 1994
- 1995
- 1996
- 1997
- 1998
- 1999
- List of crime films of the 2000s
- 2000
- 2001
- 2002
- 2003
- 2004
- 2005
- 2006
- 2007
- 2008
- 2009
- List of crime films of the 2010s
- List of crime films of the 2020s

== See also ==
- List of pirate films
