= Gabbia (film) =

- Directed by: Francesco Roder
- Written by: Francesco Roder
- Produced by: Placido Roder; Dulce Maria Bullé Goyri; Gian Paolo Roder
- Starring: Claudia Soberón
- Music by: Federica Diana
- Release dates: 14 April 2003 (Gradisca International Video Short Film Festival, Italy)
- Running time: 13 minutes
- Country: Italy

Gabbia is a 2003 independent short-film directed by Italian filmmaker Francesco Roder, who also wrote the script. It stars Mexican actress Claudia Soberón.

== Plot ==
A young woman is pushed and locked into a dark empty room. And so, her worst nightmare begins as her entire freedom is slowly taken away from her forever.

== Cast ==
- Claudia Soberón Enclosed

== Production ==
Gabbia began production in early 2002, with a story that evolved from a 1-minute video commercial screenplay to a 13-minutes short-film script. The video was shot in late 2002 in Sacile, a small town in north Italy. Mexican actress Claudia Soberón was cast as the lead after the first collaboration with the director Francesco Roder on the short film 'L'Ultimo Grido'. Her astonishing performance earned her the 'Best Actress' Award at the Italian 'Notte di Corti' in 2005. The premiere took place at the Gradisca International Video Short Film Festival: the short film took the 'Quality Student Film' certificate from a jury headed by renowned Italian filmmaker Franco Giraldi. The short film was then released in several other short film festivals in Italy. A positive review was published in the popular 'HorrorCult.com', considered one of the biggest web sites about horror films. Gabbia "is a really well crafted short-film" with "a solid direction by young Francesco Roder" and starring "an extraordinary Claudia Soberon", wrote reviewer Federico Caddeo.

== Festivals ==
- Gradisca International Video Short Film Festival 2003 ('Quality Student Film' certificate)
- Tirrenia Trema Short Film Festival 2003
- L'Invasione degli Ultracorti Short Film Festival 2004
- Bassano Short Film Festival 2004
- Campobasso Short Film Festival 2004
- Fuori Visione Showcase 2005
- Notte di Corti 2005 ('Best Actress' Award)
- Palermo International Videoart, Film and Media Festival 2005
