= Campomanes =

Campomanes may refer to:

- Pedro Rodríguez, Conde de Campomanes (1723–1802), Spanish statesman and writer.
- Florencio Campomanes (1927–2010), Filipino chess player and President of FIDE.
- Fabiola Campomanes (born 1972), Mexican actress.
