= List of Mi corazón es tuyo episodes =

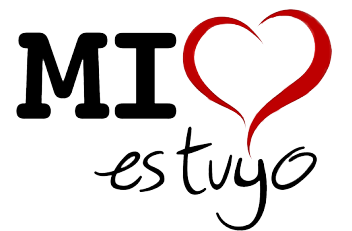

Mi corazón es tuyo is a Mexican telenovela produced by Juan Osorio for Televisa, which is transmitted by El Canal de las Estrellas. The telenovela is an adaptation of the Spanish series Ana y los 7. It is adapted in Mexico by Alejandro Pohlenz, Marcia del Río and Pablo Ferrer.

== Series overview ==
Season	Episodes	Originally released	
Season	Episodes	First released	Last released
1	176	June 30, 2014	March 1, 2015

== Episodes ==
=== Episodes 1—19 ===
Chapter	Title	General producer	Original release date	United States Broadcast
1	"Cuando llueve sobre mojado"	Juan Osorio	June 30, 2014	July 21, 2014
2	"Una nana para mis angelitos"	Juan Osorio	July 1, 2014	July 22, 2014
3	"La líder de la Tropa Lascurain"	Juan Osorio	July 2, 2014	July 23, 2014
4	"Una semana de prueba"	Juan Osorio	July 3, 2014	July 24, 2014
5	"Mamma mia ¡Molta confusione!"	Juan Osorio	July 4, 2014	July 25, 2014
6	"Una profecía y una sorpresa"	Juan Osorio	July 7, 2014	July 28, 2014
7	"#ComoDiva"	Juan Osorio	July 8, 2014	July 29, 2014
8	"Un asunto maternal"	Juan Osorio	July 9, 2014	July 30, 2014
9	"El amor es ciego"	Juan Osorio	July 10, 2014	July 31, 2014
10	"Intriga en el Chicago"	Juan Osorio	July 11, 2014	August 1, 2014
11	"Loco por Lola"	Juan Osorio	July 14, 2014	August 4, 2014
12	"Amor y deseo son dos cosas diferentes"	Juan Osorio	July 15, 2014	August 5, 2014
13	"Cosas buenas que parecen malas"	Juan Osorio	July 16, 2014	August 6, 2014
14	"Dañan más las palabras que las armas"	Juan Osorio	July 17, 2014	August 7, 2014
15	"Los problemas son oportunidades para el amor"	Juan Osorio	July 18, 2014	August 8, 2014
16	"Una visita inesperada"	Juan Osorio	July 21, 2014	August 11, 2014
17	"El error de enamorarse"	Juan Osorio	July 22, 2014	August 12, 2014
18	"Un hurón llamado Nandito "	Juan Osorio	July 23, 2014	August 13, 2014
19	"Un plan que no puede fallar"	Juan Osorio	July 24, 2014	August 14, 2014

=== Episodes 20—39 ===
Chapter	Title	General producer	Original release date	United States Broadcast
20	"Ana no es lo que parece"	Juan Osorio	July 25, 2014	August 15, 2014
21	"Un beso sincero"	Juan Osorio	July 28, 2014	August 18, 2014
22	"Te conocí pepita antes de que fueras melón"	Juan Osorio	July 29, 2014	August 19, 2014
23	"Las mentiras piadosas siguen siendo mentiras"	Juan Osorio	July 30, 2014	August 20, 2014
24	"Cuando el deber manda"	Juan Osorio	July 31, 2014	August 21, 2014
25	"El error más grande de mi vida "	Juan Osorio	August 1, 2014	August 22, 2014
26	"Perdonar y olvidar"	Juan Osorio	August 4, 2014	August 25, 2014
27	"Una boda y una tropa"	Juan Osorio	August 5, 2014	August 26, 2014
28	"La pistola del amor"	Juan Osorio	August 6, 2014	August 27, 2014
29	"Una pedida efervescente"	Juan Osorio	August 7, 2014	August 28, 2014
30	"Roto Corazón"	Juan Osorio	August 8, 2014	August 29, 2014
31	"Todo bajo control"	Juan Osorio	August 11, 2014	September 1, 2014
32	"El orgullo de la familia"	Juan Osorio	August 12, 2014	September 2, 2014
33	"Toda la verdad"	Juan Osorio	August 13, 2014	September 3, 2014
34	"Los celos ocultos"	Juan Osorio	August 14, 2014	September 4, 2014
35	"La confesión de Fernando"	Juan Osorio	August 15, 2014	September 5, 2014
36	"La boda"	Juan Osorio	August 18, 2014	September 8, 2014
37	"Luna de hiel"	Juan Osorio	August 19, 2014	September 9, 2014
38	"Pasividad agresiva"	Juan Osorio	August 20, 2014	September 10, 2014
39	"Una oportunidad para Diego"	Juan Osorio	August 21, 2014	September 11, 2014

=== Episodes 40—59 ===
Chapter	Title	General producer	Original release date	United States Broadcast
40	"La señora de la casa"	Juan Osorio	August 22, 2014	September 12, 2014
41	"La araña en la sopa"	Juan Osorio	August 25, 2014	September 15, 2014
42	"Lo único en común entre nosotros"	Juan Osorio	August 26, 2014	September 16, 2014
43	"La Bruja, el Hielo y el León"	Juan Osorio	August 27, 2014	September 17, 2014
44	"Callar y obedecer"	Juan Osorio	August 28, 2014	September 18, 2014
45	"La intriga del collar"	Juan Osorio	August 29, 2014	September 19, 2014
46	"Los amores eternos son los más breves"	Juan Osorio	September 1, 2014	September 22, 2014
47	"El secreto de Isabela"	Juan Osorio	September 2, 2014	September 23, 2014
48	"El nacimiento del amor"	Juan Osorio	September 3, 2014	September 24, 2014
49	"Un príncipe debe luchar por su princesa"	Juan Osorio	September 4, 2014	September 25, 2014
50	"La bruja azul "	Juan Osorio	September 5, 2014	September 26, 2014
51	"Noche de parejas"	Juan Osorio	September 8, 2014	September 29, 2014
52	"Cada quien en su casa"	Juan Osorio	September 9, 2014	September 30, 2014
53	"Al pie del cañón"	Juan Osorio	September 10, 2014	October 1, 2014
54	"Un clavo puede sacar a otro clavo"	Juan Osorio	September 11, 2014	October 2, 2014
55	"Las decisiones en el amor"	Juan Osorio	September 12, 2014	October 3, 2014
56	"El amor cambia"	Juan Osorio	September 15, 2014	October 6, 2014
57	"La furia de Isabela"	Juan Osorio	September 16, 2014	October 7, 2014
58	"La canción de una madre"	Juan Osorio	September 17, 2014	October 8, 2014
59	"La madre sustituta"	Juan Osorio	September 18, 2014	October 9, 2014

=== Episodes 60—79 ===
Chapter	Title	General producer	Original release date	United States Broadcast
60	"Los quince de Alicia"	Juan Osorio	September 19, 2014	October 10, 2014
61	"El mundo de Diego"	Juan Osorio	September 22, 2014	October 13, 2014
62	"Lo que falta al corazón"	Juan Osorio	September 23, 2014	October 14, 2014
63	"Lo que falta al corazón; Pies plomo part 2"	Juan Osorio	September 24, 2014	October 15, 2014
64	"Antes de que se acabe el mundo"	Juan Osorio	September 25, 2014	October 16, 2014
65	"El límite de Fernando"	Juan Osorio	September 26, 2014	October 17, 2014
66	"Jennifer, mi hermana"	Juan Osorio	September 29, 2014	October 20, 2014
67	"La fruta del dragón"	Juan Osorio	September 30, 2014	October 21, 2014
68	"La derrota de Isabela"	Juan Osorio	October 1, 2014	October 22, 2014
69	"La promesa de Fernando"	Juan Osorio	October 2, 2014	October 23, 2014
70	"Los acordes de la venganza"	Juan Osorio	October 3, 2014	October 24, 2014
71	"La prueba de paternidad"	Juan Osorio	October 6, 2014	October 27, 2014
72	"Lobo en piel de obeja"	Juan Osorio	October 7, 2014	October 28, 2014
73	"El secreto de Bruno"	Juan Osorio	October 8, 2014	October 29, 2014
74	"Una oportunidad para amar"	Juan Osorio	October 9, 2014	October 30, 2014
75	"La noche de Ana y Fernando"	Juan Osorio	October 10, 2014	October 31, 2014
76	"La realidad de Fanny"	Juan Osorio	October 13, 2014	November 3, 2014
77	"Padre de familia"	Juan Osorio	October 14, 2014	November 4, 2014
78	"Ana y Soledad"	Juan Osorio	October 15, 2014	November 5, 2014
79	"El secreto de Ana"	Juan Osorio	October 16, 2014	November 6, 2014

=== Episodes 80—99 ===
Chapter	Title	General producer	Original release date	United States Broadcast
80	"El fin de Fernando"	Juan Osorio	October 17, 2014	November 7, 2014
81	"¡El escándalo!"	Juan Osorio	October 20, 2014	November 10, 2014
82	"Amor y perdón"	Juan Osorio	October 21, 2014	November 11, 2014
83	"Una oportunidad para el amor"	Juan Osorio	October 22, 2014	November 12, 2014
84	"El corazón de Nicolás"	Juan Osorio	October 23, 2014	November 13, 2014
85	"Más cerca que nunca"	Juan Osorio	October 24, 2014	November 14, 2014
86	"El inconsciente no miente"	Juan Osorio	October 27, 2014	November 17, 2014
87	"El día que Manuela se fue"	Juan Osorio	October 28, 2014	November 18, 2014
88	"El tiempo feroz"	Juan Osorio	October 29, 2014	November 19, 2014
89	"El rap de la bruja"	Juan Osorio	October 30, 2014	November 21, 2014
90	"La autodestrucción de Diego"	Juan Osorio	October 31, 2014	November 24, 2014
91	"La muerte de Diego"	Juan Osorio	November 3, 2014	November 25, 2014
92	"Diego entre la vida y la muerte"	Juan Osorio	November 4, 2014	November 26, 2014
93	"Las manos de Diego"	Juan Osorio	November 5, 2014	November 27, 2014
94	"El castigo de Alicia"	Juan Osorio	November 6, 2014	November 28, 2014
95	"Un asunto judicial"	Juan Osorio	November 7, 2014	December 1, 2014
96	"Enamorados y... ¡Esposados!"	Juan Osorio	November 10, 2014	December 2, 2014
97	"¡El secreto de Ana está en peligro!"	Juan Osorio	November 11, 2014	December 3, 2014
98	"Las etapas de Ana y Fernando"	Juan Osorio	November 12, 2014	December 4, 2014
99	"Confianza genera confianza"	Juan Osorio	November 13, 2014	December 5, 2014

=== Episodes 100—139 ===
Chapter	Title	General producer	Original release date	United States Broadcast
100	"El campamento"	Juan Osorio	November 14, 2014	December 8, 2014
101	"Amor y Deseo"	Juan Osorio	November 17, 2014	December 9, 2014
102	"El regreso de Manuela"	Juan Osorio	November 18, 2014	December 10, 2014
103	"El primer beso de Alicia"	Juan Osorio	November 19, 2014	December 11, 2014
104	"¡La vida de Siete corre peligro!"	Juan Osorio	November 20, 2014	December 12, 2014
105	"El juego de Nando"	Juan Osorio	November 21, 2014	December 15, 2014
106	"El Ángel de Soledad"	Juan Osorio	November 24, 2014	December 16, 2014
107	"La amenaza de Isabela"	Juan Osorio	November 25, 2014	December 17, 2014
108	"¡Isabela engaña a Soledad!"	Juan Osorio	November 26, 2014	December 18, 2014
109	"¡Fernando está de regreso!"	Juan Osorio	November 27, 2014	December 19, 2014
110	"Un sueño de más de treinta años ¡Ana se reencuentra con su Mamá!"	Juan Osorio	November 28, 2014	December 22, 2014
111	"La reunión de Madre e Hija"	Juan Osorio	December 1, 2014	December 23, 2014
112	"La confesión de Soledad"	Juan Osorio	December 2, 2014	December 24, 2014
113	"Quiero amanecer con alguien"	Juan Osorio	December 3, 2014	December 25, 2014
114	"¡Sebastián tiene una cita en la cocina!"	Juan Osorio	December 4, 2014	December 26, 2014
115	"¡El regalo de Fernando!"	Juan Osorio	December 5, 2014	December 29, 2014
116	"La barrera entre Ana y Fernando"	Juan Osorio	December 8, 2014	December 30, 2014
117	"¡El secreto de Ana en la web!"	Juan Osorio	December 9, 2014	January 1, 2015
118	"¡El secreto!"	Juan Osorio	December 10, 2014	January 2, 2015
119	"¡Una romántica sorpresa en la noche!"	Juan Osorio	December 11, 2014	January 5, 2015
120	"¡El plan de Isabela!"	Juan Osorio	December 12, 2014	January 6, 2015
121	"Clase para dos ¡Ana y Fernando aprenden a bailar!"	Juan Osorio	December 15, 2014	January 7, 2015
122	"¡La maldad de Isabela!"	Juan Osorio	December 16, 2014	January 8, 2015
123	"¡Diego-Nicolás Lascurain llega al mundo!"	Juan Osorio	December 17, 2014	January 9, 2015
124	"¡Ana tiene una esperanza para guardar su secreto!"	Juan Osorio	December 18, 2014	January 12, 2015
125	"¡Querer es poder!"	Juan Osorio	December 19, 2014	January 13, 2015
126	"¡León le propone matrimonio a Fanny!"	Juan Osorio	December 22, 2014	January 14, 2015
127	"¡La mujer que yo amo!"	Juan Osorio	December 23, 2014	January 15, 2015
128	"¡Empezar de nuevo!"	Juan Osorio	December 24, 2014	January 16, 2015
129	"¡Mi corazón es Navidad!"	Juan Osorio	December 25, 2014	January 19, 2015
130	"¡El cambio del amor!"	Juan Osorio	December 26, 2014	January 20, 2015
131	"¡La química del amor!"	Juan Osorio	December 29, 2014	January 21, 2015
132	"¡Los problemas del corazón!"	Juan Osorio	December 30, 2014	January 22, 2015
133	"¡El año que fue!"	Juan Osorio	December 31, 2014	January 23, 2015
134	"¡Parejas compatibles!"	Juan Osorio	January 1, 2015	January 26, 2015
135	"¡Una sorpresa para Nando!"	Juan Osorio	January 2, 2015	January 27, 2015
136	"¡Una propuesta indecorosa!"	Juan Osorio	January 5, 2015	January 28, 2015
137	"¡Llegaron los 3 reyes magos!"	Juan Osorio	January 6, 2015	January 29, 2015
138	"¡La difícil decisión de Edith!"	Juan Osorio	January 7, 2015	January 30, 2015
139	"Las cualidades de Ana..."	Juan Osorio	January 8, 2015	February 2, 2015

=== Episodes 140—159 ===
Chapter	Title	General producer	Original release date	United States Broadcast
140	"¡De novia sigue esposa!"	Juan Osorio	January 9, 2015	February 3, 2015
141	"¡Yolanda debe de pedir perdón!"	Juan Osorio	January 12, 2015	February 4, 2015
142	"¡Isabela hace una sensual entrega a domicilio!"	Juan Osorio	January 13, 2015	February 5, 2015
143	"¡Ana firma un nuevo contrato!"	Juan Osorio	January 14, 2015	February 6, 2015
144	"¡Ana, impresionante en el tubo!"	Juan Osorio	January 15, 2015	February 9, 2015
145	"¡Un plan para Ana!"	Juan Osorio	January 16, 2015	February 10, 2015
146	"¡Una nueva amenaza para la familia Lascurain!"	Juan Osorio	January 19, 2015	February 11, 2015
147	"¡Fernando se encuentra frente a un nuevo peligro!"	Juan Osorio	January 20, 2015	February 12, 2015
148	"¡Fanny recibe una sorpresa inesperada!"	Juan Osorio	January 21, 2015	February 13, 2015
149	"¡Tan inmenso como el mar!"	Juan Osorio	January 22, 2015	February 16, 2015
150	"¡La entrega de amor!"	Juan Osorio	January 23, 2015	February 17, 2015
151	"¡La pregunta más importante!"	Juan Osorio	January 26, 2015	February 18, 2015
152	"¡La nana de mis hijos!"	Juan Osorio	January 27, 2015	February 20, 2015
153	"¡El fin del amor!"	Juan Osorio	January 28, 2015	February 23, 2015
154	"¡La ansiedad!"	Juan Osorio	January 29, 2015	February 24, 2015
155	"¡El plan de la tropa!"	Juan Osorio	January 30, 2015	February 25, 2015
156	"La familia de Ana"	Juan Osorio	February 2, 2015	February 26, 2015
157	"¡Ana, la nana!"	Juan Osorio	February 3, 2015	February 27, 2015
158	"El lobo feroz"	Juan Osorio	February 4, 2015	March 2, 2015
159	"El amor no tiene razón de ser"	Juan Osorio	February 5, 2015	March 3, 2015

=== Episodes 160—176 ===
Chapter	Title	General producer	Original release date	United States Broadcast
160	"¡Cuando el amor no funciona!"	Juan Osorio	February 6, 2015	March 4, 2015
161	"¡Don Piedra!"	Juan Osorio	February 9, 2015	March 5, 2015
162	"¡La boda de mi mejor amiga!"	Juan Osorio	February 10, 2015	March 6, 2015
163	"¡La prueba!"	Juan Osorio	February 11, 2015	March 9, 2015
164	"¡De vuelta al amor!"	Juan Osorio	February 12, 2015	March 10, 2015
165	"¡Camino al altar! "	Juan Osorio	February 13, 2015	March 11, 2015
166	"¡Aire!"	Juan Osorio	February 16, 2015	March 12, 2015
167	"¡Pensar con el corazón!"	Juan Osorio	February 17, 2015	March 13, 2015
168	"¡El bebé de Isabela!"	Juan Osorio	February 18, 2015	March 16, 2015
169	"¡Corazón de León!"	Juan Osorio	February 19, 2015	March 17, 2015
170	"¡El amor siempre regresa!"	Juan Osorio	February 20, 2015	March 18, 2015
171	"¡La verdad siempre sale a la luz!"	Juan Osorio	February 23, 2015	March 19, 2015
172	"¡La familia de Diego-Nicolás!"	Juan Osorio	February 24, 2015	March 20, 2015
173	"¡El noveno Lascurain!"	Juan Osorio	February 25, 2015	March 23, 2015
174	"¡Los planes de Isabela! "	Juan Osorio	February 26, 2015	March 24, 2015
175	"¡El amor triunfó!"	Juan Osorio	February 27, 2015	March 25, 2015
176	"¡Gran final!"	Juan Osorio	March 1, 2015	March 26, 2015 (part 1); March 27, 2015 (part 2)

== Special episodes ==
No. in series	Title	Character	Original release date
1	"La infiltrada llega a Mi corazón es tuyo"	Fernando	February 23, 2015
A mysterious infiltrated comes to mansion Lascurain to discover all the secrets of the family.
2	"Los gemelos van tras la infiltrada"	Alex and Guille	February 24, 2015
Guille and Alex wasted no time and were given the task of catching the infiltrated my heart is yours gave it yet!.
3	"¡Edith interroga a la infiltrada!"	Edíth and Ximena	February 25, 2015
The infiltrated spy Edith and Ximena! Check out the details.
4	"Alicia es presa de La infiltrada"	Alicia	February 26, 2015
Alicia fell into the clutches of 'Infiltrated' and discovered a big secret of his love with Pablo.
5	"¡La tropa vs 'La infiltrada'!"	Alicia, Guille, Alex and Sebastián	February 27, 2015
Lascurain troop finally revealed the identity of 'Infiltrated' gave it all!.
6	"¡A 'La infiltrada' le encanta Diego!"	Diego	March 2, 2015
The infiltrated melts with love for Diego Lascurain and did everything to be with him.
7	"¡León planea su boda con Fanny!"	León	March 3, 2015
León confessed to the infiltrated already planning his wedding with Fanny.
8	"¡Nando está entre 2 amores!"	Nando	March 4, 2015
Nando confessed to the 'infiltrated' that is divided between 2 loves.
9	"¡La mansión del terror!"	Luz, Alex, Guille and Sebastián	March 5, 2015
The Lascuarin mansion turned into horror and 'Infiltrated' paid all.
10	"¡La infiltrada es cómplice de Isabela!"	Isabela	March 6, 2015
'Infiltrated' joined the clan of evil Isabela and together destroy Fernando Lascuarin!.
11	"Isabela no quiere a ‘La infiltrada’"	Isabela	March 9, 2015
Our fun secret 'infiltrated' got to the football stadium in Toluca, where it was recorded the grand finale of my heart is yours, there it looked desperate to Isabela (Mayrín Villanueva) to ask him once more to help it to reach out to Fernando (Jorge Salinas), but apparently this tale witch despaired by his presence and the result was disastrous.
12	"'La infiltrada' se une a la tropa Lascurain"	La Tropa Lascurain	March 10, 2015
'Infiltrated' secret ceased to be evil and joined troop Lascurain.
13	"¡El detrás del concierto!"	Fanny	March 11, 2015
The infiltrated my heart is yours got to the concert of my heart is yours.
14	"‘La infiltrada’ caza a la bruja"	Isabela	March 12, 2015
'Infiltrated' helped the troop to hunt the Witch of Isabela.
15	"¡Llegó el final de Mi corazón es tuyo!"	La tropa Lascuraín, Nando and Ana	March 13, 2015
The infiltrated says goodbye and brings to you a message of all your actors favorites of my heart is yours!.

=== Extras ===
Chapter	Title	General producer	Original release date
0	"Capítulo Cero: El origen de Mi corazón es tuyo"	Juan Osorio	March 1, 2015
1	"Final extra: ¡Isabela y Diego juntos!"	Juan Osorio	March 1, 2015
2	"Final extra: ¡Nando y sus amores!"	Juan Osorio	March 1, 2015
3	"Final extra: ¡Isabela logra lo que siempre soñó!"	Juan Osorio	March 1, 2015
