= Francisco Denis =

Venezuelan actor and director

Francisco Denis (born 1961) is a Venezuelan actor and director.

Denis runs his own theater company in Venezuela, and has acted in about 20 films there.

== Selected filmography ==
- Takari de Chivo (TBA) Also director and writer
- Benigno Cruz (TBA)
- Zafari (2024) as Edgar
- Short Film DEMONICA (2021)
- Operacion Orion (2021)
- The Liberator as Simón Rodríguez (2013)
- 3 Bellezas (2014)
- La Mula Muerta (2012) (Shortfilm)
- De repente, la pelicula

== Selected television ==
- Diario de un gigoló (2022)
- The Revenge of Juanas (2021)
- Jack Ryan Season 2 as Miguel Ubarri(2019)
- El Comandante as Fernando Brizuela (2017)
- Narcos as Miguel Rodríguez Orejuela (2017)
