= Juan Antonio Quintana =

Spanish actor (1939–2022)

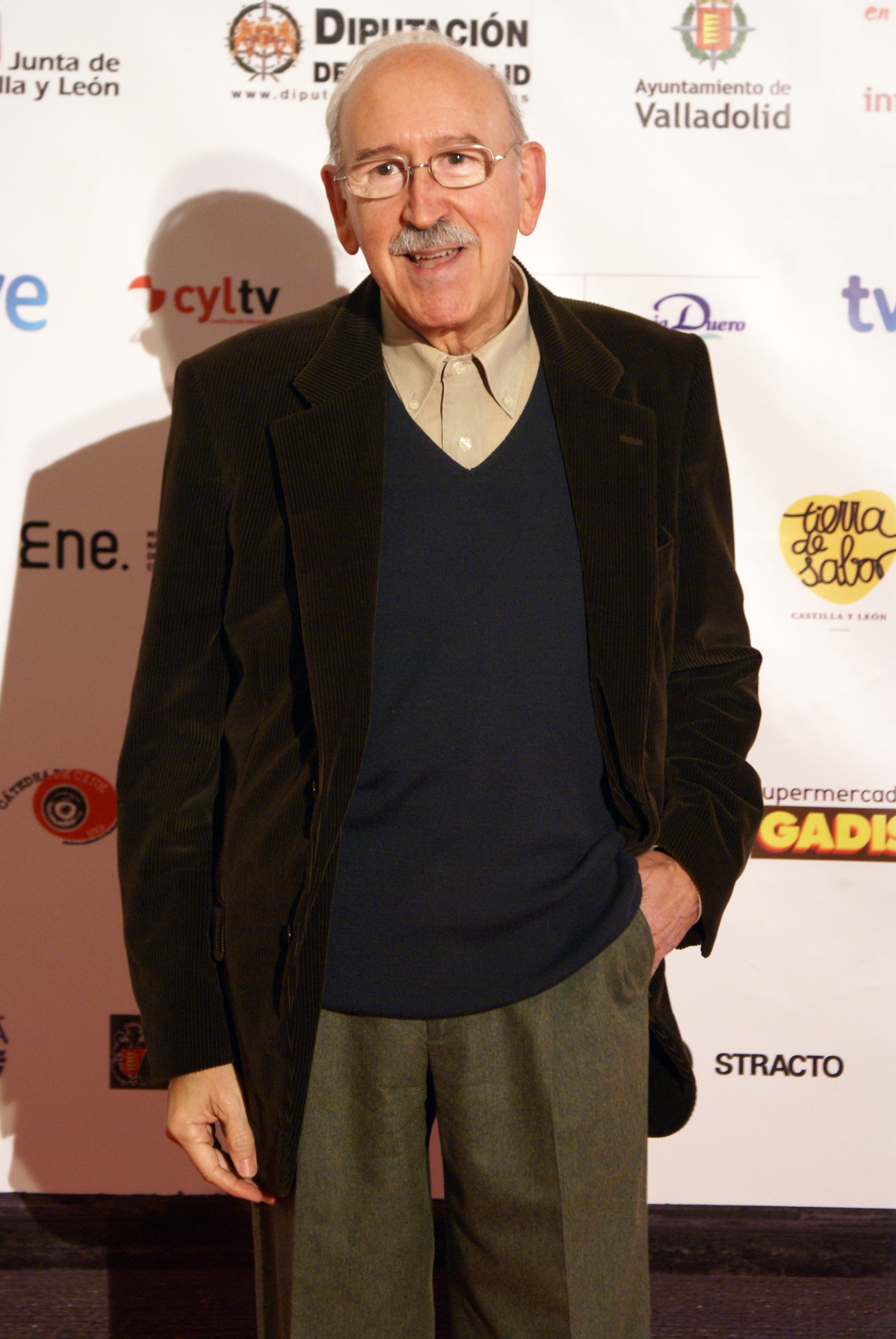
- Born: 1939; Zaragoza, Spain
- Died: 15 February 2022 (aged 82–83); Valladolid, Spain
- Education: University of Zaragoza
- Occupation: Actor

Juan Antonio Quintana (1939 – 15 February 2022) was a Spanish actor.

== Biography ==
He was born in Zaragoza in 1939. The only son of Juan, a bank clerk, and Felisa, a housewife, he was fond of cinema and theater from an early age. He studied Philosophy and Letters at the University of Zaragoza and the University of Madrid.

He made his theatrical debut at the age of seventeen, at the University of Zaragoza, with the play The Lesson by Eugène Ionesco. He finished this eight-year stage as a university actor, participating in the staging of Fuenteovejuna, by Lope de Vega, directed by Alberto Castilla at the Teatro Nacional Universitario in Madrid, which won the Grand Prix du Festival Mondial de Théâtre de Nancy (France). In 1966 he staged his first production of The Maidens' Consent, by Leandro Fernández de Moratín.

Knowing Valladolid since he was a child, due to the visits he made in the 40's and 50's to his maternal uncles in the summer, in 1968 he decided to move to this city to become an actor and has lived there ever since.

He rented a room in the city and that same year he met, in a rehearsal at the Colegio de La Salle, the woman who would become his wife and work partner, the painter and set designer Meri Maroto. They married in 1972 in the parish of San Mateo del Paseo de Zorrilla and the result of this marriage was the birth of their only daughter, Lucia, also an actress. In 1970 he created his first theater company, the Corral de Comedias de Valladolid.

He later obtained a teaching post in Secondary Education, beginning his career as a teacher in the Pajarillos neighborhood and later at the Polytechnic Institute of La Merced in Valladolid. Since his retirement, he has dedicated himself exclusively to cinema, theater and television.

He promoted theater courses in the city, and in the 1976-77 academic year he created the Aula de Teatro de la Universidad de Valladolid, through which actors such as Diego Martín, Eva Hache, Lucía Quintana, Eva Martín or Carlos Domingo passed.

The Aula de Teatro is a place of study and rehearsal closely linked to his second company, the Teatro Estable de Valladolid, which would later be renamed Compañía Juan Antonio Quintana. With this company, he has produced a total of more than forty productions.

In 1984 he received the Gold Medal for best actor, and in 1998 the prestigious Mayte de Teatro award for his performance in Yepeto. In 1997 he made his film debut in the movie Mamá es boba, and in 1999 he made his television debut with a role in the series Manos a la obra.

In 2000 a tribute was paid to him at the Teatro Calderón for his contribution to the theater and later a seat was dedicated to him with his name in the remodeled Teatro Zorrilla.

He played the character of Nicolás in the series Ana y los 7, in the 2002 to 2005 seasons.

In 2011 he played Basilio, the grandfather, in the series Amar en tiempos revueltos.

He died in Valladolid on 15 February 2022.
