= List of crime films of 2004 =

This is a list of crime films released in 2004.

Title	Director	Cast	Country	Notes
36 Quai des Orfèvres	Olivier Marchal	Daniel Auteuil, Gérard Depardieu, André Dussollier	France	Crime drama
Breaking News	Johnnie To	Richie Jen, Kelly Chen, Nick Cheung, Cheung Siu-Fai	Hong Kong	
Bullet Boy	Saul Dibb	Ashley Walters, Luke Fraser, Clare Perkins	United Kingdom	Crime drama
Cellular	David R. Ellis	Kim Basinger, Chris Evans, Jason Statham	United States	Crime thriller
Collateral	Michael Mann	Tom Cruise, Jamie Foxx	United States	
Criminal	Gregory Jacobs	John C. Reilly, Diego Luna, Maggie Gyllenhaal	United States	
Dead Man's Shoes	Shane Meadows	Paddy Considine, Gary Stretch, Toby Kebbell	United Kingdom	Crime thriller
The Edukators	Hans Weingartner	Daniel Brühl, Julia Jentsch, Stipe Erceg	Austria; Germany	
Je Suis un Assassin	Thomas Vincent	François Cluzet, Bernard Giraudeau, Karin Viard	France	
The Ladykillers	Ethan Coen, Joel Coen	Tom Hanks, Marlon Wayans, J.K. Simmons	United States	
Layer Cake	Matthew Vaughn	Daniel Craig, Colm Meaney, Kenneth Cranham	United Kingdom	
Never Die Alone	Ernest R. Dickerson	DMX, David Arquette, Michael Ealy	United States	
Ocean's Twelve	Steven Soderbergh	George Clooney, Brad Pitt, Matt Damon	United States	
Right Now	Benoît Jacquot	Isild Le Besco, Ouassini Embarek, Nicolas Duvauchelle	France	
Soba	Alan Coton	Dagoberto Gama, Claudia Soberón	Mexico	Crime drama
Starsky & Hutch	Todd Phillips	Ben Stiller, Owen Wilson, Snoop Dogg	United States	
Three Way	Scott Ziehl	Ali Larter, Desmond Harrington, Joy Bryant	United States	
