= Anima (2003 film) =

- Directed by: Erika Grediaga
- Written by: Erika Grediaga
- Produced by: José Carlos Mangual
- Starring: Claudia Soberón; Carol Abney; Dennis Deal; Rick Simon; Katira Santiago; Melodee Spevack
- Music by: Steven Gutheinz
- Release date: December 5, 2003
- Running time: 26 minutes

Anima is a 2003 short-film directed and written by Erika Grediaga. Produced by the American Film Institute, it stars Mexican actress Claudia Soberón.

The story is based on some of the legends about monastic life during the colonial period in Latin America.

== Plot ==
16th century. The Catholic Church has expanded throughout the new continent, Nueva España. New monasteries are being built, but the missionaries’ Holy cities are threatened by forces unknown: the earth shakes, buildings collapse, nothing is spared. The devout seek protection by strengthening their faith—some even willing to sacrifice themselves.

One hundred years later, poverty forces young Angelica (Claudia Soberón) into God's service against her will. Rebellious, Angelica tries to escape into the outside world—closed behind the convent's doors, sealed by her vows. As punishment, Angelica is confined to her cell where she is haunted by the spirit of Sister Luciana (Katira Santiago). The ghost, a nun entombed one hundred years in the convent walls, compels Angelica to free her trapped soul.

To release Luciana, Angelica will have to persuade the nuns to leave the convent and pray in the open, but to leave the cloister is expressly forbidden.

== Cast ==
- Claudia Soberón Angelica
- Carol Abney Mother Superior
- Dennis Deal Brother Matheo Bonilla
- Rick Simon Father Francisco
- Katira Alvarez Sor Luciana de Jesus
- Melodee Spevack Ignacia, Angelica's mother

== Production ==
Anima was produced at the AFI Conservatory in partial fulfillment of the requirements for the Master of Fine Arts Degree or Certificate of Completion. Erika Grediaga (AFI Directing Fellow) Ismail Ahmed (AFI Editing Fellow), James W. Thompson Jr. (AFI Production Design Fellow), Jitsu Toyoda (AFI Cinematography Fellow) and José Carlos Mangual (AFI Producing Fellow) got their master's degree in 2003. Of note, "Anima" means "Soul" in Latin.

== Principal Screenings & Festivals ==
- Los Angeles (world premiere) (US premiere)
- San Diego Latino Film Festival 2004
- AFI Conservatory Showcase 2004
- Los Angeles Latino International Film Festival 2004
- Palm Springs International Short Film Festival 2004
- Lake Arrowhead Film Festival 2004
- Montreal Ibero American Film Festival 2004 (Canadian premiere)
- Trieste Festival of Latin-American Cinema 2004 (European Premiere)
- Hollywood International Student Film Festival 2005
- Reel Women International Film Festival 2005
- Mexico City Horror Film Festival (Latin American premiere)

== Awards and nominations ==
- Imagen Foundation Awards 2004: Best Theatrical Short or Student Film - Nominated (Erika Grediaga)
- Hollywood International Student Film Festival 2005: Best Cinematography - Winner (Jitsu Toyoda)
