= Diary of a Gigolo =

American telenovela

- Spanish: Diario de un gigoló
- Genre: Drama
- Created by: Sebastián Ortega
- Written by: Silvina Fredjkes; Alejandro Quesada
- Directed by: Mariano Ardanaz
- Starring: Jesús Castro; Victoria White; Fabiola Campomanes; Francisco Denis; Begoña Narváez; Eugenia Tobal; Alosian Vivancos; Adriana Barraza
- Composer: Diego Monk
- Country of origin: United States
- Original language: Spanish
- No. of seasons: 1
- No. of episodes: 10

Production
- Executive producers: Pablo Flores; Juan Ponce; Pablo Culell; Sebastián Ortega; Marcos Santana
- Producer: Valeria Martino
- Editors: Cecilia Calarota; Sebastián Polze; Lucrecia Caramagna; Jonathan Smeke
- Production companies: Underground; Telemundo Streaming Studios

Original release
- Network: Netflix
- Release: September 7, 2022

Diary of a Gigolo (Spanish: Diario de un gigoló) is an American television miniseries produced by Underground for Telemundo. It stars Jesús Castro, Victoria White, and Fabiola Campomanes.

Diary of a Gigolo premiered on Netflix on September 7, 2022.

== Plot ==
Emanuel (Jesús Castro) is an escort who lives a luxurious life. After surviving a childhood of violence and poverty, Emanuel forms a bond with Minou (Adriana Barraza), a businesswoman who takes him under her wing and helps him become a sought-after escort. But his destiny changes when Ana (Fabiola Campomanes), one of his frequent clients, offers him a complex job: to seduce her daughter Julia (Victoria White) in order to strengthen her self-esteem. With Julia's arrival, Emanuel unexpectedly becomes romantically involved, leading him to question his life choices. Consumed by jealousy for the growing love that she herself encouraged, Ana threatens to tell her daughter the truth about Emanuel in order to put an end to their romance. Blinded by his passion for Julia, Emanuel fails to see the dangers that will affect his uncertain future with her and his life as a gigolo.

== Cast ==
=== Main ===
- Jesús Castro as Emanuel Morillo
- Victoria White as Julia
- Fabiola Campomanes as Ana Miró Sanz de Lubos
- Francisco Denis as Víctor Lubos
- Begoña Narváez as Florencia Arias
- Eugenia Tobal as Dolores
- Alosian Vivancos as Abel
- Adriana Barraza as Minou Arias

=== Recurring ===
- Carlos Portaluppi as Román
- Carla Pandolfi as Campos
- Diego Alfonso as Aguilar
- Nacho Gadano as Padilla
- Juan Cottet as Lino
- Gastón Ricaud as Facundo
- Manuela Pal as Leticia
- Graciela Tenenbaum as Rosa
- Mirta Márquez as Lola
- Victoria Biocca as Margui

== Production ==
The series was announced on May 12, 2021, at Telemundo's upfront for the 2021-2022 television season. The cast was announced on November 15, 2021. Filming took place from September 2021 to December 2021.

== Release ==
The series was originally scheduled to premiere in January 2022. However, the premiere had been delayed for unexplained reasons. On August 25, 2022, it was announced that the series would premiere on Netflix on September 7, 2022. The series premiered on Telemundo on 12 November 2022.

== Reception ==
=== Awards and nominations ===
Year	Award	Category	Nominated	Result	Ref
2023	Produ Awards	Best Acción, Horror or Thriller Series	Diary of a Gigolo	Nominated	
2023	Produ Awards	Best Supporting Actress - Series or Miniseries	Adriana Barraza	Won	
