= Historias y testigos =

- Written by: Mimi Belt
- Directed by: René Cardona jr.
- Starring: Fabiola Campomanes; José Luis Franco; Ludyvina Velarde; Fabián Garza; Patricio Castillo; Veronica de la Campa; Roberto Mateos; Claudia Soberón
- Music by: Didier Rachou
- Country of origin: Mexico
- Original language: Spanish

Production
- Producers: Eduardo Galindo; Santiago Galindo
- Running time: 110 minutes

Original release
- Network: Telemundo
- Release: 10 April 2004

¡Ni una muerta más! (Not One More Death) is the first episode of Historias y Testigos, a 2004 TV miniseries produced and televised by Florida's Telemundo.

== Synopsis ==
Every episode of Historias y testigos is based on a real event occurring along the Mexico–United States border, particularly in and around the city of Ciudad Juárez, Chihuahua.

Valentina Suarez (Fabiola Campomanes), a young and ambitious recently graduated reporter, has been just hired by an important TV Network. Even if her father (Patricio Castillo) is the CEO of the company, she's willing to be noted for her own merits. Her first assignment leads her to work with Diego Calderon (José Luis Franco), a war reporter who's recently returned from a traumatic experience in the Orient. Their first job together starts when Valentina receives the news that one of her best childhood friends, Manuela (Claudia Soberon), has been kidnapped, tortured and killed. They head to Juarez, a Mexican border-town, in order to investigate the woman's mysterious death. As they start the investigation, other two girls are also brutally murdered. With the collaboration of Melisa (Ludyvina Velarde), a computer genius and Pelon (Fabian Garza), Diego's assistant, Valentina and Diego face the mystery behind the unsolved murders of more than 300 women, which involves the corruption of Mexican Police and several other unknown facts . . .

== Cast ==
The case of this episode consisted of:

- Fabiola Campomanes as Valentina
- José Luis Franco as Diego
- Ludyvina Velarde as Melisa
- Fabián Garza as Pelón
- Patricio Castillo as Don Alejandro
- Veronica de la Campa as Nancy
- Roberto Mateos as Ernesto
- Claudia Soberón as Manuela

== Epilogue ==
Soon after the successful release of Historias y testigos: ¡Ni una muerta más! in the United States, the Mexican TV network Azteca started pre-production for a similar product which was later entitled "Tan Infinito como el Desierto" (As Infinite as the Desert). While critically acclaimed, "Historias y testigos: ¡Ni una muerta más!" was appreciated for being an accurate dramatization based on real facts but with fictional characters, while TV Azteca's star-filled "Tan Infinito como el Desierto" was severely accused by Juarez' government for infaming the city of Juarez, since the teleplay was supposedly based on poor and false research and included the names of real-life people.
