= List of crime films of 2000 =

This is a list of crime films released in 2000.

Title	Director	Cast	Country	Notes
3 Strikes	DJ Pooh	Brian Hooks, N'Bushe Wright, Faizon Love	United States	Crime comedy
Asfalto	Daniel Calparsoro	Najwa Nimri, Juan Diego Botto, Gustavo Salmerón	Spain	Crime thriller
Baise-Moi	Virginie Despentes, Coralie Trinh Thi	Raffaela Anderson, Karen Bach	France	
Bait	Antoine Fuqua	Jamie Foxx, David Morse, Doug Hutchison	United States	
Beautiful Creatures	Bill Eagles	Rachel Weisz, Susan Lynch, Alex Norton	United Kingdom	
Before the Storm	Reza Parsa	Per Graffman, Emil Odepark	Sweden	drama crime thriller
The Boondock Saints	Troy Duffy	Willem Dafoe, Sean Patrick Flanery, Norman Reedus	United States	
Brother	Takeshi Kitano	Beat Takeshi, Claude Maki, Omar Epps	Japan; United Kingdom	
Burnt Money	Marcelo Piñeyro	Eduardo Noriega, Leonardo Sbaraglia, Leticia Brédice	Argentina; France; Spain; Uruguay	
Chaos	Hideo Nakata	Miki Nakatani, Masato Hagiwara, Ken Mitsuishi	Japan	Crime thriller
Chopper	Andrew Dominik	Eric Bana, Simon Lyndon	Australia	
Circus		Lucy Akhurst, Christopher Biggins, Amanda Donohoe	United Kingdom	
The City of Lost Souls	Takashi Miike	Teah, Michelle Reis, Mitsuhiro Oikawa	Japan	
La comunidad	Álex de la Iglesia	Carmen Maura, Eduardo Antuna, Jesus Bonilla	Spain	Crime comedy
The Crew	Michael Dinner	Richard Dreyfuss, Burt Reynolds, Dan Hedaya	United States	Crime comedy
Dead or Alive 2: Birds	Takashi Miike	Sho Aikawa, Riki Takeuchi	Japan	
Dinner Rush	Bob Giraldi	Danny Aiello, Edoardo Ballerini, Vivian Wu	United States	Crime comedy
Four Dogs Playing Poker		Olivia Williams, Balthazar Getty	United States	
Gangster No. 1	Paul McGuigan	Malcolm McDowell, David Thewlis, Paul Bettany	United Kingdom; Germany	
Get Carter	Stephen Kay	Sylvester Stallone, Miranda Richardson	United States	Crime thriller
Gone in 60 Seconds	Dominic Sena	Nicolas Cage, Angelina Jolie	United States	Caper
Greenfingers	Joel Hershman	Clive Owen, David Kelly, Helen Mirren	United States; United Kingdom	
Gun Shy	Eric Blakeney	Liam Neeson, Oliver Platt, Sandra Bullock	United States	Crime comedy
Hochelaga		David Boutin, Ronald Houle	Canada	Crime thriller
Memento	Christopher Nolan	Guy Pearce, Carrie-Anne Moss	United States	Crime thriller
Nine Queens	Fabián Bielinsky		Argentina	
Nurse Betty	Neil LaBute	Renée Zellweger, Morgan Freeman, Chris Rock	United States	
O Brother, Where Art Thou?	Joel Coen	George Clooney, John Turturro, Tim Blake Nelson	United States	
Once in the Life	Laurence Fishburne	Laurence Fishburne, Titus Welliver, Eamonn Walker	United States	
Panic	Henry Bromell	William H. Macy, John Ritter, Neve Campbell	United States	Crime drama
The Proposal	Richard Gale	Jennifer Esposito, Nick Moran, Stephan Lang	United States	
Reindeer Games	John Frankenheimer	Ben Affleck, Gary Sinise, Charlize Theron	United States	
Saving Grace	Nigel Cole	Brenda Blethyn, Craig Ferguson, Martin Clunes	United Kingdom	Crime comedy
Scalpers	Adam Rodin	Steve Braun	Canada	Crime drama
Sexy Beast	Jonathan Glazer	Ray Winstone, Ben Kingsley, Ian McShane	United Kingdom	
Shaft	John Singleton	Samuel L. Jackson, Vanessa Williams, Jeffrey Wright	United States	
Small Time Crooks	Woody Allen	Woody Allen, Tracey Ullman, Hugh Grant	United States	Crime comedy
Snatch	Guy Ritchie	Benicio del Toro, Dennis Farina, Vinnie Jones	United States; United Kingdom	
Space Travelers	Katsuyuki Motohiro	Takeshi Kaneshiro, Eri Fukatsu, Masanobu Andō	Japan	
Strictly Sinatra	Peter Capaldi	Ian Hart, Kelly Macdonald, Alun Armstrong	United Kingdom	Crime drama
Traffic	Steven Soderbergh	Michael Douglas, Don Cheadle, Benicio del Toro	United States	Crime drama
The Way of the Gun	Christopher McQuarrie	Ryan Phillippe, Benicio del Toro, James Caan	United States	
When the Sky Falls	John MacKenzie	Joan Allen, Patrick Bergin, Liam Cunningham	United States; United Kingdom; Ireland	Crime drama
Where the Money Is	Marek Kanievska	Paul Newman, Linda Fiorentino	United States	
The Whole Nine Yards	Jonathan Lynn, David Snyder		United States	Crime comedy
