= Before the Storm (2000 film) =

- Theatrical release poster
- Directed by: Reza Parsa
- Written by: Mikael Bengtsson; Reza Parsa
- Cinematography: Eigil Bryld
- Edited by: Louise Brattberg
- Music by: Peter Lundback
- Production companies: Illusion Film & Television; Norsk Film
- Distributed by: Columbia TriStar Films (Sweden) AB
- Release dates: 22 September 2000 (Sweden); 20 October 2000 (AFI Film Festival)
- Running time: 101 minutes
- Country: Sweden
- Language: Swedish

Before the Storm (Före stormen) is a drama crime thriller film directed by Reza Parsa released in 2000.

== Synopsis ==
Leo is a Swedish teenager who is bullied at school and Ali is a taxi driver who is blackmailed by terrorists. Surrounded by violence in their lives, both try to solve their problems.

== Cast ==
- Per Graffman as Ali
- Maria Lundqvist as Ali's wife
- Emil Odepark as Leo
- Martin Wallström as Danne
- Tintin Anderzon as Leo's mother
- Christer Fant as Leo's father
- Sasha Becker as Sara
- Anni Ececioglu as Jenny
- Claes Ljungmark as Johan Sander

== Reception ==
Jonathan Holland of Variety gave the movie a positive review saying that is "strongly scripted and well-played treat convincingly employs thriller elements to make its heavyweight agenda palatable." In his review for The New York Times, Stephen Holden wrote that "is a timely if overly schematic meditation on the gloomier implications of the notion that indeed we're all connected."

For Screen International, Sheila Johnston wrote that "while the movie has faults, the bulk of it is forceful and emotionally involving".

== See also ==
- List of drama films of the 2000s
- List of crime films of the 2000s
- List of thriller films of the 2000s
