= Mi corazón es tuyo =

Mexican telenovela (2014–2015)

- Also known as: My Heart is Yours
- Genre: Telenovela; Romantic comedy
- Based on: Ana y los 7 by Ana Obregón
- Written by: Pablo Ferrer García-Travesí; Ana Obregón; Alejandro Pohlenz; Ricardo Tejeda; Marcia del Río
- Directed by: Jorge Fons; Lili Garza; Aurelio Ávila; Mauricio Manzano
- Starring: Silvia Navarro; Jorge Salinas; Mayrín Villanueva
- Opening theme: "Mi corazón es tuyo" by Kaay and Axel
- Ending theme: "Todo tuyo" by Banda El Recodo
- Country of origin: Mexico
- Original language: Spanish
- No. of episodes: 176 (list of episodes)

Production
- Executive producer: Juan Osorio
- Producers: Ignacio Ortiz; Roy Nelson Rojas
- Production locations: Filming; Televisa San Ángel Mexico City, Mexico; Locations; Toluca, Mexico; Lerma, Mexico; Riviera Nayarit, Mexico; Puerto Vallarta, Mexico
- Cinematography: Mauricio Manzano; Alejandro Álvarez; Gilberto Macin
- Running time: 42-45 minutes

Original release
- Network: Canal de las Estrellas
- Release: June 30, 2014 – March 1, 2015

Mi corazón es tuyo (English title: My Heart is Yours) is a Mexican telenovela produced by Juan Osorio for Televisa. The telenovela is an adaptation of the Spanish TV series Ana y los 7. It was adapted in Mexico by Alejandro Pohlenz, Marcia del Río, and Pablo Ferrer.

Silvia Navarro and Jorge Salinas are the protagonists, while Mayrín Villanueva stars as the main antagonist and Fabiola Campomanes is the co-protagonist.

Production of Mi corazón es tuyo officially started on April 21, 2014.

== Plot ==
Fernando Lascurain is a wealthy businessman and recent widower, attempting to raise his seven unruly children: Estefania "Fanny", Fernando "Nando", Alicia, Sebastian, Alex, Guille and Luz. He seeks the assistance of a new nanny, despite his children having driven away all the previous ones. He hires and falls in love with Ana Leal, a struggling exotic dancer who tries to hide her double life. Although Ana lacks experience and a refined education, she quickly bonds with the Lascurain children. Ana dreams of being a mother and also to find her lost-long mother, who left her in an orphanage at the age of three with only her beloved guitar, but when her home is destroyed following an accident, she must borrow money from her ruthless boss at "Chicago", the night club where she is secretly employed. When Fernando simultaneously falls for Ana and Isabela, an economist and sophisticated woman who is trained by her mother to marry a millionaire, he must choose between both women.

Just when Fernando realizes he's in love with Ana, he decides to marry Isabela instead, who is pregnant and he believes that the baby is his, when the father is actually Enrique, a fellow employee from their company and Isabela's ex-lover who secretly hates Fernando.

Fernando and Isabela marry, much to his children's dismay and Ana's heartbreak, and she later finds solace with Diego, Fernando's brother. Time pass and Isabela and Fernando's marriage fails because he still has feelings for Ana, and also because Isabela mistreats Fernando's children and Ana, and he sees her true colors and divorces her.

Soon, after many efforts, he manages to reconcile with Ana and proposes to her and she accepts, but Isabela sets him up to discover Ana's double life in the Chicago club and feeling deceived, he angrily calls off their engagement.

However, after almost losing Ana to a vengeful and insane Enrique (who dies before he could reveal to Fernando that he was the real father of Isabela's son, Diego Nicolas), Fernado forgives her and despite Isabela's efforts to sabotage them, they get married and Ana gives birth to twin girls and live happily with their ten children, while Isabela ends up morbidly obese, poor and alone.

== Production ==
The telenovela is an adaptation of the original Spanish television series, Ana y los 7. Based on the original script by Ana Obregón, who wrote and starred in the original series, the remake was adapted by writers Alejandro Pohlenz, Marcia del Río, and Pablo Ferrer. Juan Osorio serves as executive producer. The production of the telenovela officially started on April 21, 2014, at a shopping mall in Metepec, Mexico, outside of Mexico City. Although the majority of filming is conducted on soundstages at Televisa San Ángel in Mexico City, additional scenes are also filmed throughout the state of Mexico, where its governor, Eruviel Ávila Villegas, met with the cast during one day of filming. Some of the cast filmed scenes in Puerto Vallarta and a resort in Riviera Nayarit in late January 2015.

Filming concluded in late February 2015. A free concert, serving as the telenovela's final episode, was filmed at La Bombonera stadium in Toluca, Mexico on February 21, 2015. The concert featured performances from Banda El Recodo, Daniela Romo, Axel, Kaay, Paulina Goto, Pablo Montero, and other special guests. The telenovela's finale is scheduled to air on March 1, 2015 in Mexico and March 27, 2015 in the US. Following the airing of the final episode on television, ten more additional episodes and three alternative endings were available to stream on the telenovela's (now inactive) official website, MiCorazonesTuyo.com.

=== Promotion ===
To promote the telenovela, a special viewing party, which included the presentation of the cast, crew, and a trailer of new scenes, was held for the media on June 24, 2014, at Televisa San Ángel. The event was also streamed exclusively online for fans on Televisa's official website of the telenovela.

=== Casting ===
Many of the cast members, including Carmen Salinas, Juan Pablo Gil, Paulina Goto, and Rene Casados, auditioned for the program at the Televisa San Ángel studio in Mexico City on February 13, 2014. Their casting in the telenovela was officially confirmed later that same month.

=== Theatre production ===
On February 6, 2015, producers revealed that a stage version of the telenovela had been commissioned due its popularity in Mexico. The cast rehearsed for the play while simultaneously filming final episodes for the telenovela. The play, based on a family friendly version of the show, will include all of the Lascuráin family members and special musical performances from the cast. Productions will be held throughout Mexico. The play debuted on March 6, 2015 in Puebla, Mexico. Additional performances are scheduled for venues in Guadalajara, Monterrey, Tampico, León, Mexico City, and other Mexican cities during March and April 2015.

List of concerts, showing date, city, country and venue
Date	City	Country	Venue
Leg 2 – Mexico
April 2, 2015	Mexico City	Mexico	Centro Cultural Telmex Teatro 1
April 3, 2015 (Note: Two opening acts.)	Mexico City	Mexico	Centro Cultural Telmex Teatro 1
April 4, 2015	Mexico City	Mexico	Centro Cultural Telmex Teatro 1
April 5, 2015	Mexico City	Mexico	Centro Cultural Telmex Teatro 1
April 9, 2015	Mexico City	Mexico	Centro Cultural Telmex Teatro 1
April 10, 2015	Mexico City	Mexico	Centro Cultural Telmex Teatro 1
April 11, 2015	Mexico City	Mexico	Centro Cultural Telmex Teatro 1
April 12, 2015	Mexico City	Mexico	Centro Cultural Telmex Teatro 1
April 17, 2015	Mexico City	Mexico	Centro Cultural Telmex Teatro 1
April 18, 2015	Mexico City	Mexico	Centro Cultural Telmex Teatro 1
April 19, 2015	Mexico City	Mexico	Centro Cultural Telmex Teatro 1

== Cast ==
Actor	Character
Silvia Navarro	Ana Leal
Jorge Salinas	Fernando Lascuráin
Mayrín Villanueva	Isabela Vázquez De Castro
Pablo Montero	Diego Lascuráin
Jorge Aravena	Ángel Altamirano
Adrián Uribe	Juan "Johnny" Gutiérrez
Paulina Goto	Estefanía "Fanny" Lascuráin Diez
Carmen Salinas	Yolanda De Castro Vázquez
Fabiola Campomanes	Jennifer Rodríguez
Rafael Inclán	Nicolás Lascuráin
Polo Morín	Fernando "Nando" Lascuráin Diez
Daniela Romo	Herself
Marco Corleone	Mike
Juan Pablo Gil	León González
René Casados	Bruno Romero
Lisardo Guarinos	Enrique Basurto
Diana Motta	Pelna Obsada
Karla Gómez	Estefanía Diez de Lascuráin
Emilio Osorio	Sebastián Lascuráin Diez
Daniela Cordero	Ximena Luján Landeros
Beatriz Morayra	Manuela Limón
Isidora Vives	Alicia Lascuráin Diez
José Pablo Alanís	Guillermo "Guille" Lascuráin Diez
Manuel Alanís	Alejandro "Alex" Lascuráin Diez
Isabella Tena	Luz Lascuráin Diez
Ana García Obregón	Herself
Karla Farfán	Laura

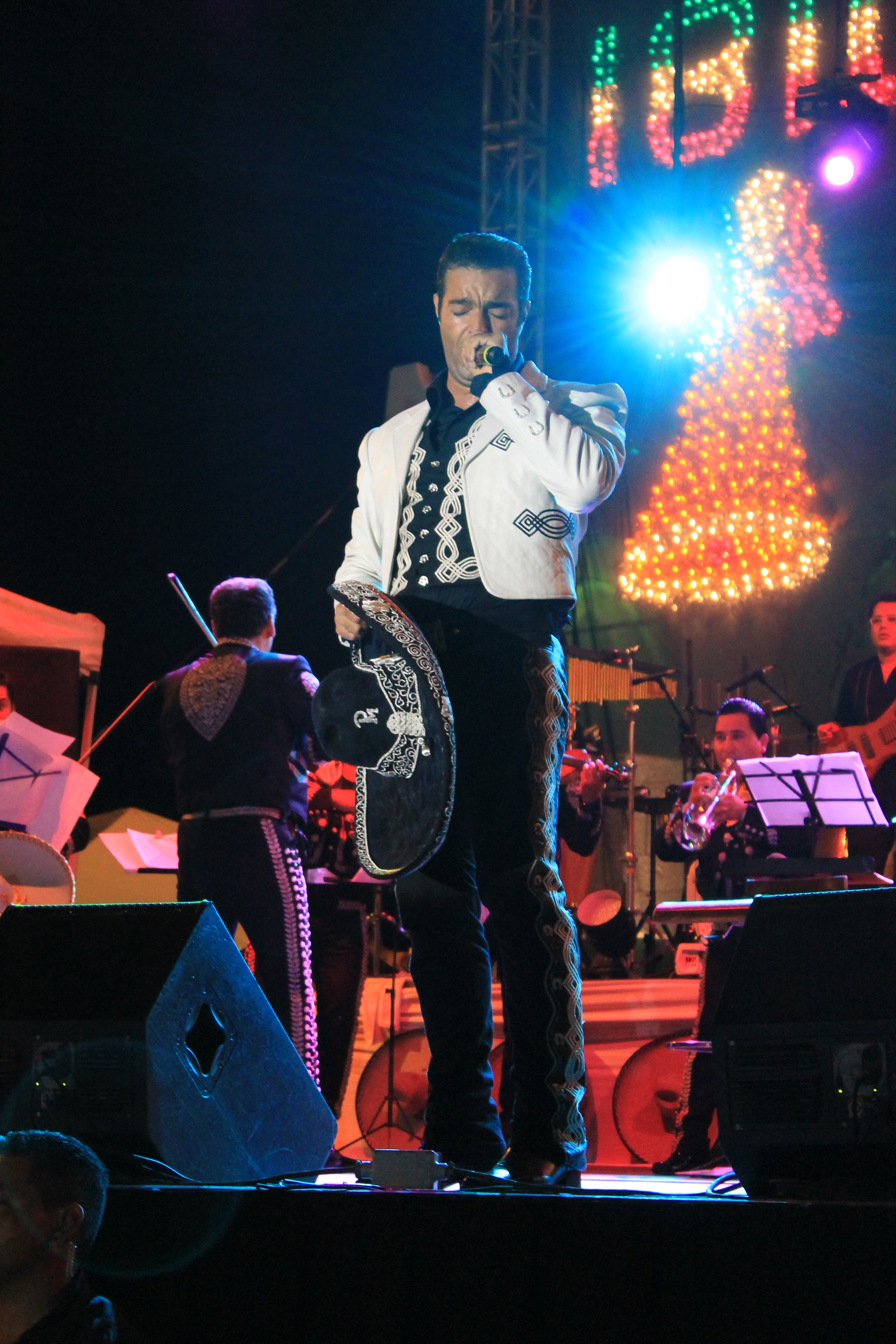
Pablo Montero as Diego Lascuraín

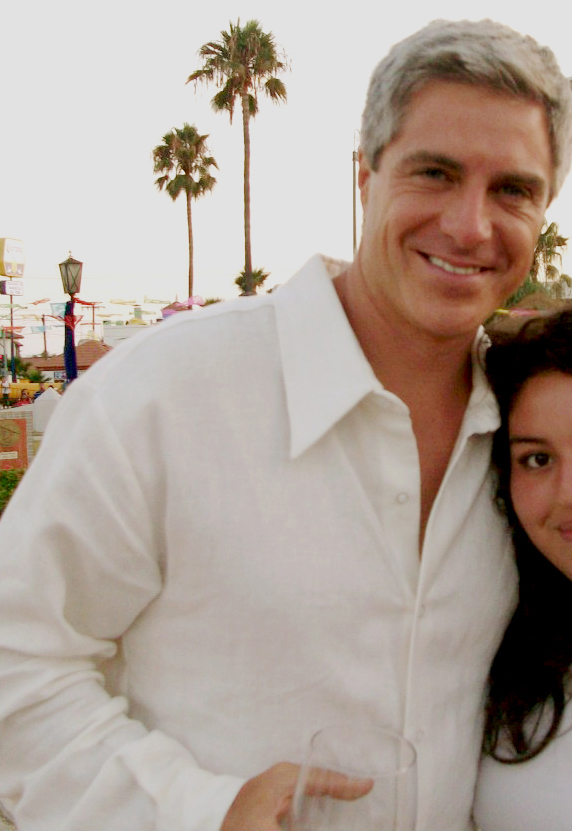
Lisardo Guarinos as Enrique Basurto

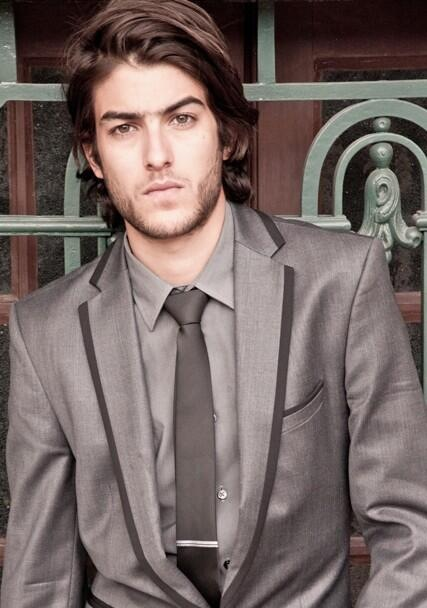
Juan Pablo Gil as Léon González

== Mexico broadcast ==
Following its premiere on June 30, 2014, the program earned a 22.8 in ratings for its 8 p.m. time slot. It was the second highest rated telenovela of the evening on Canal de las Estrellas, following the telenovela, Lo que la vida me robó.

On June 30, 2014, Canal de las Estrellas began broadcasting Mi corazón es tuyo weeknights at 8:25pm, replacing Qué pobres tan ricos. The last episode was broadcast on March 1, 2015, with Amores con trampa replacing it the following day.

Timeslot (ET/PT)	No. of episodes	Premiered		Ended	
Timeslot (ET/PT)	No. of episodes	Date	Premiere Rating	Date	Finale Rating
Monday to Friday 8:20PM	176	June 30, 2014	22.8	March 1, 2015	27.9

== United States broadcast ==
During its premiere week from July 21 to July 25 on Univision, the telenovela was watched by 8.4 million viewers, earning Univision the #1 spot a broadcast network for viewers aged 18 to 34 in the 8 p.m.time slot.

Univision began broadcasting Mi corazón es tuyo on July 21, 2014, weeknights at 8pm/7c, replacing one hour of De que te quiero, te quiero. The last episode was broadcast on March 27, 2015, with Amores con trampa replacing it on March 30, 2015.

Track	Song	Singer(s)	Running time	References
1	"Mi corazón es tuyo"	Kaay and Axel	3:18	
2	"Llévame despacio"	Paulina Goto	4:26	
3	"Volveremos a ser"	Los niños	—N/a	
4	"Todos en la cocina"	Silvia Navarro and Los niños	—N/a	
5	"Te tengo y no"	Pablo Montero	—N/a	
6	"Maquina del tiempo"	Abraham Batarse	4:11	
7	"De cabeza"	Poncho and Valeria	3:24	
8	"Shalala"	La Klave	—N/a	
9	"Yo voy contigo"	Brisa Carrillo	2:07	
10	"Quisiera ser"	Robert Padilla	—N/a	
11	"El rap de la bruja"	Emilio Osorio	—N/a	
12	"Piensa un poco en mí"	Gommah	—N/a	
13	"Nunca dije"	Kaay	3:02	
14	"Todo Tuyo"	Banda El Recodo	—N/a	
15	"No Te Vayas"	Pandora (musical group)	1:07	
16	"Junto a mi"	Emilio Osorio	—N/a	
17	"Ojitos bonitos"	Pablo Montero	—N/a	

== Awards and nominations ==
Year	Award	Category	Nominated	Result
2014	Premios People en Español	Best Actress	Silvia Navarro	Won
2014	Premios People en Español	Galanazo del año	Jorge Salinas	Nominated
2014	Premios People en Español	Best on-screen chemistry	Silvia Navarro and Jorge Salinas	Nominated
2014	Premios People en Español	Best Female Antagonist	Mayrín Villanueva	Nominated
2014	Premios People en Español	Best telenovela	Mi corazón es tuyo	Nominated
2015	33rd TVyNovelas Awards and Favoritos del Público TVyNovelas Awards	Best Telenovela of the Year	My Heart is Yours	Won
2015	33rd TVyNovelas Awards and Favoritos del Público TVyNovelas Awards	Best Lead Actor	Jorge Salinas	Nominated
2015	33rd TVyNovelas Awards and Favoritos del Público TVyNovelas Awards	Best Female Antagonist	Mayrín Villanueva	Nominated
2015	33rd TVyNovelas Awards and Favoritos del Público TVyNovelas Awards	Best Young Lead Actress	Paulina Goto	Won
2015	33rd TVyNovelas Awards and Favoritos del Público TVyNovelas Awards	Best Young Lead Actor	Juan Pablo Gil	Nominated
2015	33rd TVyNovelas Awards and Favoritos del Público TVyNovelas Awards	Best First Actor	René Casados	Nominated
2015	33rd TVyNovelas Awards and Favoritos del Público TVyNovelas Awards	Best Cast	Mi corazón es tuyo	Nominated
2015	33rd TVyNovelas Awards and Favoritos del Público TVyNovelas Awards	Best Musical Theme	"Mi corazón es tuyo" by Axel and Kaay	Won
2015	33rd TVyNovelas Awards and Favoritos del Público TVyNovelas Awards	Favorite Couple	Silvia Navarro and Jorge Salinas	Nominated
2015	33rd TVyNovelas Awards and Favoritos del Público TVyNovelas Awards	Slap Favorite	Mayrín Villanueva and Silvia Navarro	Nominated
2015	33rd TVyNovelas Awards and Favoritos del Público TVyNovelas Awards	Best Kiss	Silvia Navarro and Jorge Salinas	Nominated
2015	33rd TVyNovelas Awards and Favoritos del Público TVyNovelas Awards	Best Smile	Paulina Goto	Won
2015	33rd TVyNovelas Awards and Favoritos del Público TVyNovelas Awards	The Most Handsome	Jorge Salinas	Nominated
2015	33rd TVyNovelas Awards and Favoritos del Público TVyNovelas Awards	The Prettiest	Silvia Navarro	Nominated
2015	33rd TVyNovelas Awards and Favoritos del Público TVyNovelas Awards	Favorite Villains	Mayrín Villanueva	Nominated
2015	33rd TVyNovelas Awards and Favoritos del Público TVyNovelas Awards	Favorite Final	Mi corazón es tuyo	Won
2015	Premios Juventud	Favorite Male Actor	Jorge Salinas	Won
2015	Premios Juventud	Favorite Female Actress	Paulina Goto	Nominated
2015	Premios Juventud	Favorite Female Actress	Silvia Navarro	Won
2015	Premios Juventud	Best Theme Novelero	"Mi corazón es tuyo" by Axel and Kaay	Nominated
2015	Kids Choice Awards México	Favorite Actor	Polo Morín	Won
2015	Kids Choice Awards México	Favorite Actress	Paulina Goto	Won
2015	Kids Choice Awards México	Favorite Revelation	Emilio Osorio Marcos	Nominated
2015	Kids Choice Awards México	Favorite Revelation	Juan Pablo Gil	Nominated
2015	Kids Choice Awards México	Favorite Revelation	Isabella Tena	Won
2015	Kids Choice Awards México	Favorite Song	"Llévame despacio" by Paulina Goto	Nominated
2015	Kids Choice Awards México	Favorite Program or Series	Mi corazón es tuyo	Nominated
2016	Premios ASCAP	Song of the Year: Television	Axel and Kaay	Nominated
