= Fabiola Campomanes =

Mexican actress (born 1972)

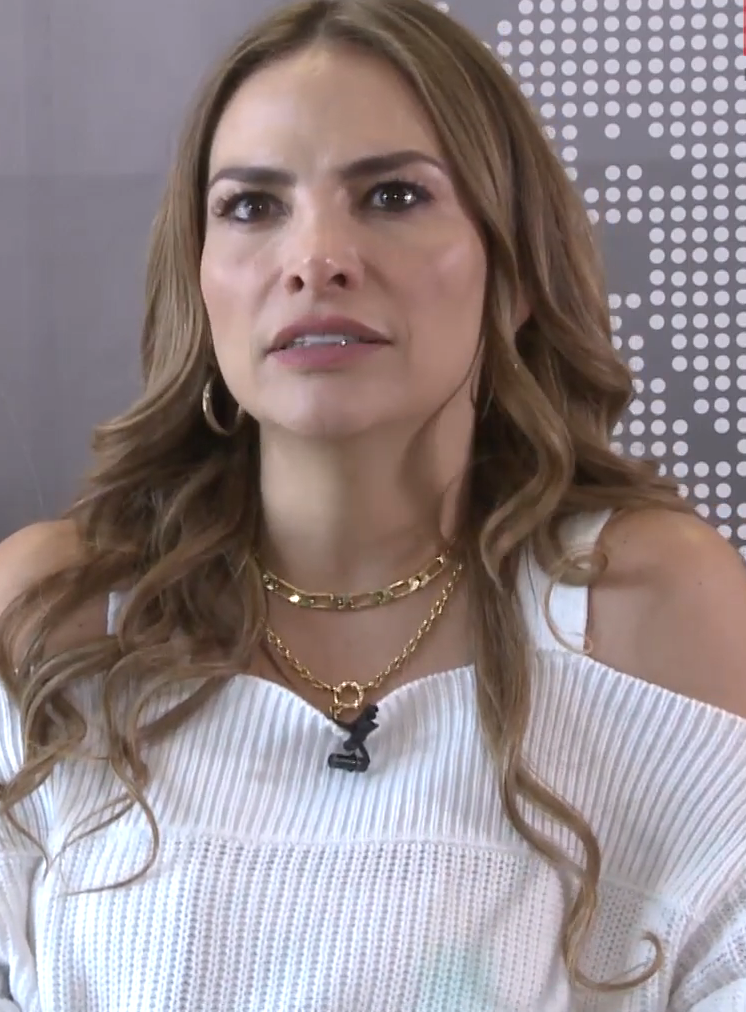
- Campomanes in 2020
- Born: Fabiola Campomanes Rojas; 30 July 1972 (age 54); Mexico City, Mexico
- Occupations: Actress, businesswoman
- Years active: 1991–present

Fabiola Campomanes Rojas (born 30 July 1972) is a Mexican actress.

== Biography ==
Campomanes enrolled at the Centro de Educación Artística (CEA) run by Televisa. In addition, she studied film and television direction at UCLA. Campomanes began her career in Los parientes pobres (1993) acting next to Lucero and Ernesto Laguardia. After that, she began acting in the telenovelas Imperio de Cristal (1995), María José (1995) and in Los hijos de nadie (1997).

In 1998, Campomanes earned her first starring role in the telenovela Azul tequila. She continued in La calle de las novias (2000), and Ladrón de corazones (2003), as co-protagonist.

In 2005, Campomanes received the proposal to pose naked for Playboy magazine, which she accepted. She then posed for the magazine H Extremo. The following year she returned in the telenovela Duelo de Pasiones interpreting the villain Thelma, and in 2008 playing another villain, Alice, in Las tontas no van al cielo, acting alongside Jacqueline Bracamontes, and Jaime Camil. In 2009, Campomanes received the proposal to star in the telenovela Niños Ricos, Pobres Padres for the network Telemundo. In 2010, she returned to Televisa, in the telenovela Teresa, portraying the innocent Esperanza, and shared credits with Angelique Boyer and Sebastián Rulli.

After production on Teresa ended, Campomanes interpreted the twins of the telenovela Amorcito corazón. In 2014 she played Jennifer, her second co-starring role, in Mi corazón es tuyo, sharing credits with Silvia Navarro, with whom she had previously performed in La calle de las novias. also made his last novel in Televisa

In 2016, she switched to the TV Azteca broadcaster, which saw her grow up as an actress.

== Filmography ==
Telenovelas, Films, TV presenter
Year	Title	Role	Notes
1991–1992	Vida Robada		Supporting role
1993	Los parientes pobres	Elda	Supporting role
1994	Prisionera de amor	Lucila	Supporting role
1994–1995	Imperio de Cristal	Juanita	Supporting role
1995	María José	Linda	Special appearance
1995–1997	Mujer, casos de la vida real		TV series
1995–1996	Retrato de familia	Malena	Supporting role
1996	Cococobana		Film
1997	Los hijos de nadie	Lourdes	Supporting role
1998–1999	Azul tequila	Lorenza de Icaza	Lead role
2000	La calle de las novias	María Sánchez	Main role
2001	Lo que callamos las mujeres	Ángeles	TV series
2002	Agua y aceite	Elena	Special appearance
2002	El país de las mujeres	Renata	Supporting role
2002	Francisca	Adela	Film
2002	...De qué lado estas?		Film
2003	Ladrón de corazones	Inés Santoscoy	Lead role
2004	Motel	Leonor de la rosa	Film
2004	Big Brother VIP 3	Herself	Reality Show-Finished 4th Place
2004	Historias y testigos: ¡Ni una muerta más!	Valentina	TV film
2005–2008	Incógnito	Herself/Presenter	TV show
2006	Duelo de pasiones	Thelma Castelo	Main cast
2006	Ambiciona	Paola	Film
2006–2008	Wax, TV ácida	Herself/Presenter	TV show
2008	Las tontas no van al cielo	Alicia Morales Alcalde de Molina	
2008	Lokas		Film
2008	Enemigos íntimos		Film
2009	Tiempo final	Tatiana	TV series
2009–2010	Niños Ricos, Pobres Padres	Lucía Ríos Vda de Paz	Lead role
2009–2010	Hasta Que el Dinero Nos Separe	Lola Sansores "La Coqueta"	
2010–2011	Teresa	Esperanza Medina Domiguez de Ledesma	Main role
2011–2012	Correo de inocentes	Australia	Special appearance
2011–2012	Amorcito Corazon	Manuela Ballesteros Tres Palacios/Sofía Ballesteros Tres Palacios de Lobo	
2014	Dos Lunas	Karina Rangel	TV series
2014–2015	Mi corazón es tuyo	Jennifer Rodríguez Lascurain	Recurring role
2017	Guerra de ídolos	Itzel Paz	Recurring role
2019–2024	El juego de las llaves	Bárbara Cuevas	Main role
2021	40 no es nada	Herself	Reality series
2022	Diario de un gigoló	Ana Miro Sanz de Lubos	Series regular
2022	Cabo	Malena	
2025	La Granja VIP	Herself	Reality show

== Awards and nominations ==
=== Premios TVyNovelas ===
Year	Category	Telenovela	Result
2007	Best Female Antagonist	Duelo de pasiones	Nominated

=== MTV Movie Awards Mexico ===
Year	Category	Film	Result
2003	Favorite Actress	De Qué Lado Estás	Nominated
