= Reza Parsa =

Swedish film director

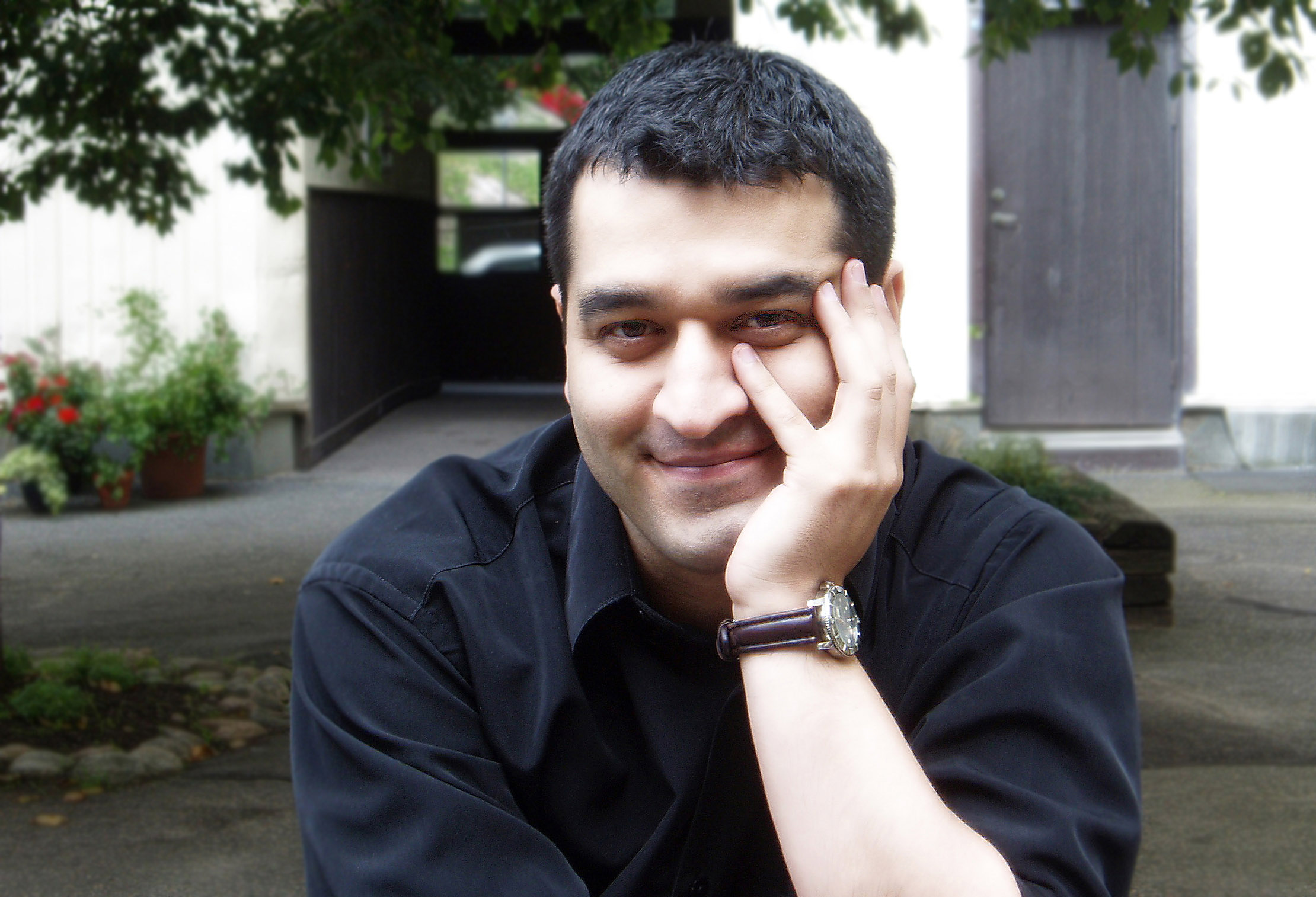
- Born: 9 June 1968 (age 57); Tehran, Iran
- Occupations: Film director; Screenwriter
- Years active: 1991 - present
- Awards: Ingmar Bergman Award

Reza Parsa (born 9 June 1968) is an Iranian-Swedish film director, who has won many national and international awards.

== Early life and education ==
Reza Parsa was born in Tehran, Iran, on 9 June 1968, and moved to Sweden in 1980.

At the age of 22, he was admitted to the directing program at the National Film School of Denmark (1991–95) and directed the most award-winning (11 awards) graduation film, Never (Gränsen), in the history of the school.

== Career ==
Before the Storm Parsa's first feature film, is a suspense thriller which achieved great critical success and was sold to 35 countries worldwide, including the United States.

Parsa works with screenwriter Johan Bergman Lindfors.

== Awards ==
Parsa has won many national and international awards, including the Ingmar Bergman Award, the Student Academy Award (Student Oscar) and prizes in Cannes Film Festival, Brasília, Seattle, Chicago, and San Sebastian.

Guldbagge Awards, Swedish Film Institute	Ingmar Bergman Award (2002)
Uppsala International Short Film Festival	Uppland Film Trust Award
Copenhagen International Film Festival	New Nordic Talent
San Sebastian International Film Festival (Youth Jury Award)	Best Film
San Sebastian International Film Festival	Best Director (2000)
Seattle International Film Festival	Special Jury Prize
Brasília Film Festival	Special Jury Prize
Children and Young People's International Film Festival (BUFF) in Sweden	Grand Prix
Swedish Film Academy: Kurt Linder Memorial Fund Grant	(2000)
Cannes International Film Festival (Young Critics' Award)	Best Short Film
Isfahan International Short Film Festival	Best Film
Chicago International Film Festival	Best Short Fiction
Student Academy Award (Academy of Motion Picture Arts and Science)	Student Oscar - Best Foreign Film
International Student Film Festival in Tel-Aviv	Best Director
National Swedish Television (Sveriges Television)	Steen Priwin Award
Nordic Panorama (Audience Award)	Best Film
Nordic Panorama (Honorary Jury Award)	Best First Film
International School Film Festival in Mexico	Best Film
International School Film Festival in Mexico (Catholic Church Award)	Best Film
Uppsala International Short Film Festival	Best Fiction Film
Henri Langlois International Film Festival	Best Director
International Festival of Film Schools - Munich (Young Talent Award)	Best Film (1995)
International Festival of Film Schools - Munich	Honorary Screenplay Award (1995)

== Selected filmography ==
=== Director ===
- The Haga Man (Hagamannen) (2009)
- Meeting Evil (Möte med Ondskan) (2002)
- Before the Storm (Före Stormen) (2000)
- The 8th Song (Den 8:e Sången) (1998)
- Tigerheart (Tigerhjärta) (1997)
- Never (Gränsen) (1995)

=== Screenwriter ===
- Meeting Evil (Möte med Ondskan) (2002)
- Before the Storm (Före Stormen) (2000)
- The 8th Song (Den 8:e Sången) (1998)
- Never (Gränsen) (1995)

=== Concept creator ===
- Aviation (2003)
- Belas Dukkehus (2003)
- It's All Good (2003)
- Min Velsignede Bror (2003)
- Det Ulogiske Instrument (2003)
