= Ana y los 7 =

- Genre: Comedy
- Created by: Ana Obregón
- Country of origin: Spain
- Original language: Spanish
- No. of seasons: 5
- No. of episodes: 91

Production
- Production company: Star line productions for Televisión Española

Original release
- Network: TVE1
- Release: 18 March 2002 – 30 May 2005

Ana y los 7 (transl. Ana and the 7), is a Spanish prime-time television family comedy series that originally ran on La Primera Cadena of Televisión Española (TVE) for five seasons from 18 March 2002 to 30 May 2005, starring Ana Obregón as a stripper who becomes the nanny of seven children from an upper-class family. The series was created by Obregón herself and has spawned several foreign adaptations in Portugal, Mexico, Italy and Chile.

== Plot ==
Ana García Palermo, is a struggling exotic dancer who tries to hide her double life as a nightclub stripper and a nanny of the seven unruly children of Fernando Hidalgo, a rich banker and recent widower, with whom she falls in love.

== Episodes ==
Season	Episodes	Originally released		Avg. viewers (millions)	Avg. share
Season	Episodes	First released	Last released	Avg. viewers (millions)	Avg. share
1	17	18 March 2002	8 July 2002	5.015	30.5%
2	24	18 December 2002	9 June 2003	6.105	34.7%
3	24	17 December 2003	24 May 2004	5.966	31.8%
4	13	20 September 2004	13 December 2004	4.818	24.8%
5	13	28 February 2005	30 May 2005	4.755	25.4%

== Cast and characters ==
Character	Portrayed by	Seasons				
Character	Portrayed by	1	2	3	4	5
Ana García Palermo	Ana Obregón	Main	Main	Main	Main	Main
Fernando Hidalgo	Roberto Álvarez	Main	Main	Main	Main	Main
Nicolás Hidalgo	Juan Antonio Quintana	Main	Main	Main	Main	Main
Carolina Hidalgo	Claudia Molina	Main	Main	Main	Main	Main
Fernando Hidalgo Jr.	Aarón Guerrero	Main	Main	Main	Main	Main
David Hidalgo	Daniel Freire	G	Main	Main	Main	
Andrea Hidalgo	Nadia de Santiago			Recurring	Recurring	
Bruno	Javivi	Main	Main	Main	Main	Main
Manuela	Aurora Sánchez	Main	Main	Main	Main	
Alexia Vázquez de Castro	Silvia Marsó	Main	Main	Main		
Rosa de Castro	Mónica Randall	Recurring	Recurring	Recurring		
Tony	Micky Molina	Main	Main			
Blanca	Ana Polvorosa			Recurring	Recurring	
Rebeca	Edurne				R	
Carmen Palermo	María José Alfonso				M	
Silvia Curiel García	Neus Asensi				M	

== Foreign versions ==
The series has spawned several foreign adaptations. It was adapted in Portugal as Ana e os Sete, Mexico as Mi corazón es tuyo, Italy as Anna e i cinque, and Chile as Ana y los siete.
