= Soba (film) =

2004 film by Alan Coton

- Theatrical Poster
- Directed by: Alan Coton
- Written by: Alan Coton
- Produced by: Erika Grediaga; Alfredo Abaroa; Antonio Chaulet
- Starring: Claudia Soberón; Dagoberto Gama; Antonio Algarra; Miguel Loaiza; Hena Corzo; Jorge Zárate; Silverio Palacios
- Music by: Christian Arvesen
- Distributed by: La Chancla (Mexico, Theatrical); Zafra Video (Mexico, Home Entertainment); Vanguard Cinema (USA, Home Entertainment)
- Release dates: 9 September 2004 (Mexico); 24 January 2006 (U.S.)
- Running time: 84 minutes
- Country: Mexico
- Language: Spanish

Soba is a 2004 independent drama/crime film and the directional debut from Mexican filmmaker Alan Coton, who also wrote the script. It stars newcomer Claudia Soberón and Dagoberto Gama.

== Synopsis ==
Justina, a fifteen-year-old girl, lives with her mother and stepfather in a suburb of Mexico City. On the verge of sexual awakening, she starts flirting with her stepfather, provoking the murder of both her parents. She runs away from home, temporarily insane, wearing nothing but her nightgown. Ivan, a police detective who practices torture as a daily routine and is now reduced to the rank of street cop, is ordered to look for her all night long. Justine gets picked up on the street by two cops that take her to their headquarters and held her hostage for their own purposes. Ivan finally tracks her down and eventually frees her from her captivity. From that moment, the lives of both Justina and Ivan will change forever.

== Cast ==
- Claudia Soberón as Justina
- Dagoberto Gama as Ivan
- Antonio Algarra as Captain
- Miguel Loaiza as Ramon
- Hena Corzo as Marife
- Jorge Zárate as Cop I
- Silverio Palacios as Ojitos
- Antonio Chaulet as Guy on the street
- Alberto Acosta as Cachorro
- Roberto Álvez as Minezota
- Jaime Estrada as Gordo
- Silvia Rizo as Miriam
- Alicia Sandoval as Martita
- Silvia Salinas as Mari
- Lida Jiménez as Angelita
- Patricia Collazo as Narco's wife
- Cirilo Santiago as Esteban
- Kengi Guerrero as Chino
- Homero Maturano as Narco
- Óscar Trejo as Oscar

== Production ==
Based on the true story of three girls raped by a group of cops in Tláhuac, Mexico City, the movie was produced by an independent production team of former film students of Centro Universitario de Estudios Cinematográficos called Cooperativa 9.5 en la escala de Richer SC de RL. Filmed in B/W 35 mm film over the course of two weeks in February 1999 in several locations of Mexico City, the movie marked the film debut of 22-years-old actress Claudia Soberón. It also starred Dagoberto Gama in one of his first lead roles.

Being financed without the support of national funds and with a final budget of 1,2m pesos (approximately $100k), the movie eventually completed post-production in late 2003. A new production company, La Chancla Producciones, S.A. de C.V, was formed by the director Alan Coton and newcomer producer Sophie Avernin to support the post-production process and complete the film.

== Release ==
The movie debuted in competition at the Sofia International Film Festival in March 2004. It reportedly almost got into the Cannes Film Festival of the same year and that lead to the invitation at the Three Continents Festival in Nantes.

After the festival tour, the movie was supported by Cinemark Theatres for its independent commercial release in Mexico. The film opened in 3 screens in Mexico City on 9 September 2005 . It subsequently opened in other selected cities of Mexico, including Monterrey, with the same 3 original copies. The Mexican theatrical distribution of the film eventually lasted over 5 months.

The movie was released in the US territory straight to DVD on 24 January 2006.

=== Critical reception ===
The film received mixed to positive reviews. Cahiers du cinéma called Soba "an astonishing self-produced film noir, based on an unforeseeable script". According to film critic Stéphane Delorme (comité de sélection, Cannes), it was "the best and most exciting Mexican film of the year" and El Financiero said it was "a great movie".

Radio France Internationale lauded the film's "disturbing" atmosphere, calling it "a UFO in Mexican cinema" and Uno Mas Uno labeled it as "a ruthless incursion into the world of perversion and corruption". Stephane Pichelin of Leif Magazine also appreciated the film saying: "Soba confirms the renewal of Latin American fiction cinema".

Claudia Soberón's performance as Justina was appreciated but the job of the other actors was generally panned: according to Rafael Aviña of Reforma, her portrayal was "outstanding" but the rest of the cast was "unremarkable". He also added that "subtlety isn't really Alan Coton's thing". La Jornada described Claudia Soberón as "a sensual and disturbing Justina" while Diana González of El Norte called the rest of the cast "totally uneffective". She went on saying that the "pretentious film merely focused on its own solemn and pompous style".

== Festivals ==
- Sofia International Film Festival 2004
- Nantes Three Continents Festival 2004
- Guadalajara Film Festival 2004
- Alucine Film Festival 2004 (Mexico)
- Tallinn Black Nights Film Festival 2004
- Granada Film Festival 2005
- Santa Cruz International Latino and Indie Film Festival 2005
- Human Rights Film Festival 2005
- Eckerd College International Cinema Series 2006
- Argenmex Film Festival 2006 (Argentina)

== See also ==
- Alan Coton on Spanish Wikipedia
