= List of crime films of 2001 =

This is a list of crime films released in 2001.

Title	Director	Cast	Country	Notes
The 51st State	Ronny Yu	Samuel L. Jackson, Robert Carlyle, Emily Mortimer	United Kingdom; Canada	Crime thriller
3000 Miles to Graceland	Demien Lichtenstein	Kurt Russell, Kevin Costner, Courteney Cox Arquette	United States	
Bandits	Barry Levinson	Bruce Willis, Billy Bob Thornton, Cate Blanchett	United States	
Blow	Ted Demme	Johnny Depp, Penélope Cruz	United States	Crime drama
Blue Hill Avenue	Craig Ross Jr.	Allen Payne, William Forsythe, Aaron D. Spears	United States	
Family	Takashi Miike	Kenichi Endō, Kouichi Iwaki	Japan	
The Fast and the Furious	Rob Cohen	Paul Walker, Vin Diesel, Michelle Rodriguez	United States	
Heist	David Mamet	Gene Hackman, Danny DeVito, Delroy Lindo	United States	
Highway	James Cox	Jared Leto, Jake Gyllenhaal, Selma Blair	United States	
Ichi the Killer	Takashi Miike	Tadanobu Asano, Nao Omori, Shinya Tsukamoto	Japan	
Kill Me Later	Dana Lustig	Selma Blair, Max Beesley, Brendan Fehr	United States	Crime thriller
Knockaround Guys	Brian Koppelman, David Levien		United States	
Love the Hard Way	Peter Sehr	Adrien Brody, Charlotte Ayanna, Jon Seda	United States; Germany	
Made	Jon Favreau	Vince Vaughn, Jon Favreau, Sean Combs	United States	
The Man Who Wasn't There	Joel Coen	Billy Bob Thornton, Frances McDormand, Michael Badalucco	United States	
The Mexican	Gore Verbinski	Brad Pitt, Julia Roberts, James Gandolfini	United States	
Novocaine	David Atkins	Steve Martin, Helena Bonham Carter, Laura Dern	United States	Crime comedy
Ocean's Eleven	Steven Soderbergh	George Clooney, Brad Pitt, Matt Damon	United States	
One Night at McCool's	Harald Zwart	Liv Tyler, Matt Dillon, John Goodman	United States	Crime comedy
OSS 117: Cairo, Nest of Spies	Michel Hazanavicius	Jean Dujardin, Bérénice Bejo, Aure Atika	France	Spy comedy
Pistol Opera	Seijun Suzuki	Makiko Esumi, Sayoko Yamaguchi, Kan Hanae	Japan	Crime thriller
Protection	John Flynn	Stephen Baldwin, Carlo Berardinucci, Brennan Delaney	Canada	
Read my Lips	Jacques Audiard	Vincent Cassel, Emmanuelle Devos, Olivier Gourmet	France	Crime thriller
Roberto Succo	Cédric Kahn	Stefano Cassetti, Isild Le Besco, Patrick Dell'Isola	France	
Rosarigasinos	Rodrigo Grande		Argentina	
Scenes of the Crime	Dominique Forma	Jeff Bridges, Jon Abrahams, Noah Wyle	United States	Crime thriller
The Score	Frank Oz	Robert De Niro, Edward Norton	United States	
Sugar & Spice	Francine McDougall	Marley Shelton, James Marsden, Mena Suvari	United States	
Swordfish	Hugh Jackman, Halle Berry, Dominic Sena	John Travolta,	United States	
Training Day	Antoine Fuqua	Denzel Washington, Ethan Hawke	United States	
The Watcher	Joe Charbanic	James Spader, Marisa Tomei, Keanu Reeves	United States	Crime thriller
What's the Worst That Could Happen?	Sam Weisman	Martin Lawrence, Danny DeVito, John Leguizamo	United States	Crime comedy
Who Is Cletis Tout?	Chris Ver Weil	Christian Slater, Tim Allen, Portia de Rossi	United States	Crime comedy
