= List of crime films of 2008 =

This is a list of crime films released in 2008.

Title	Director	Cast	Country	Notes
The Accidental Gangster and the Mistaken Courtesan	Yeo Gyoon-dong	Lee Jung-jae, Kim Ok-vin	South Korea	
Bangkok Dangerous	Oxide Pang Chun, Danny Pang	Nicolas Cage	United States	Crime thriller
The Bank Job	Roger Donaldson	Jason Statham, Saffron Burrows, Stephen Campbell Moore	United States	
Bronson	Nicolas Winding Refn	Tom Hardy, Hugh Ross, Juliet Oldfield	United Kingdom	
The Dark Knight	Christopher Nolan	Christian Bale, Heath Ledger, Aaron Eckhart, Maggie Gyllenhaal	United Kingdom; United States	Crime drama, crime thriller
Donkey	Adrian Langley	Matthew Stefiuk, Gregry Wilson, Douglas Kidd	Canada	
Gomorra	Matteo Garrone	Nicolo Manta, Gianfelice Imparato	Italy	Crime drama
In Bruges	Martin McDonagh	Colin Farrell, Ralph Fiennes, Brendan Gleeson, Clémence Poésy	Belgium; United Kingdom	Crime drama
JCVD	Mabrouk El Mechri	Jean-Claude Van Damme, François Damiens, Zinedine Soualem	Belgium; Luxembourg; France	
Mad Money	Callie Khouri	Diane Keaton, Queen Latifah, Katie Holmes	United States	Crime comedy
Max Payne	John Moore	Mark Wahlberg, Mila Kunis, Chris O' Donnell	United States	Crime thriller
Pathology	Marc Schoelermann	Milo Ventimiglia, Alyssa Milano, Lauren Lee Smith	United States	
RocknRolla	Guy Ritchie	Gerard Butler, Tom Wilkinson, Thandiwe Newton	United Kingdom	
Sans Arme, Ni Haine, Ni Violence	Jean-Paul Rouve	Jean-Paul Rouve, Alice Taglioni, Gilles Lellouch	France	
Street Kings	David Ayer	Keanu Reeves, Forest Whitaker, Hugh Laurie, Chris Evans	United States	
The Spirit	Frank Miller	Gabriel Macht, Samuel L. Jackson, Sarah Paulson	United States	
The Square	Nash Edgerton	David Roberts, Claire van der Boom, Joel Edgerton	Australia	Crime thriller
