= List of crime films of 2002 =

This is a list of crime films released in 2002.

Title	Director	Cast	Country	Notes
25th Hour	Spike Lee	Edward Norton, Philip Seymour Hoffman, Barry Pepper	United States	Crime drama
All About the Benjamins	Kevin Bray	Ice Cube, Mike Epps	United States	Criminal comedy
And Now... Ladies and Gentlemen	Claude Lelouch	Jeremy Irons, Patricia Kaas, Thierry Lhermitte	France; United Kingdom	Crime thriller
Ash Wednesday	Edward Burns	Edward Burns, Elijah Wood, Rosario Dawson	United States	Crime drama
Assassination Tango	Robert Duvall	Robert Duvall, Rubén Blades, Kathy Baker	United States	Crime drama, crime thriller
Better Luck Tomorrow	Justin Lin	Parry Shen, Jason Tobin, Kang Sung	United States	Crime drama
Big Trouble	Barry Sonnenfeld	Tim Allen, Rene Russo, Stanley Tucci	United States	
Catch Me If You Can	Steven Spielberg	Leonardo DiCaprio, Tom Hanks	United States	
City of God	Kátia Lund, Fernando Meirelles	Alexandre Rodrigues, Leandro Firmino da Hora, Matheus Nachtergaele	Brazil	
City of Ghosts	Matt Dillon	Matt Dillon, Natascha McElhone, Gérard Depardieu	United States	Crime thriller
Dark Blue	Ron Shelton	Kurt Russell	United States	
Deadly Outlaw: Rekka	Takashi Miike	Kenichi Endō, Ryosuke Miki, Riki Takeuchi	Japan	Crime thriller
Dirty Pretty Things	Stephen Frears	Audrey Tautou, Chiwetel Ejiofor	United Kingdom	Crime thriller
Drowning Mona	Nick Gomez	Danny DeVito, Bette Midler, Neve Campbell	United States	
Empire	Franc. Reyes	John Leguizamo	United States	
Femme Fatale	Brian De Palma	Rebecca Romijn, Antonio Banderas, Peter Coyote	United States	Crime thriller
Gangs of New York	Martin Scorsese	Leonardo DiCaprio, Daniel Day-Lewis, Cameron Diaz	United States	Crime drama
The Good Thief	Neil Jordan	Nick Nolte, Nutsa Kukhianidze, Tchéky Karyo	France; United Kingdom; Ireland	
Graveyard of Honor	Takashi Miike	Goro Kishitani, Narimi Arimori, Shingo Yamashiro	Japan	
The Hard Word	Scott Roberts	Guy Pearce, Rachel Griffiths, Robert Taylor	United Kingdom; Australia	
Infernal Affairs	Andrew Lau, Alan Mak	Tony Leung Chiu-Wai, Andy Lau, Anthony Wong	Hong Kong	
Insomnia	Christopher Nolan	Al Pacino, Robin Williams, Hilary Swank	United States	Psychological thriller
Kiss of Debt	Derek Diorio	Tyley Ross, Ernest Borgnine	Canada	Crime comedy
Narc	Joe Carnahan	Ray Liotta, Jason Patric	United States	
Night at the Golden Eagle	Adam Rifkin	Vinny Argiro, Donnie Montemarano, Vinnie Jones	United States	
No Good Deed	Bob Rafelson	Samuel L. Jackson, Milla Jovovich	United States; Germany	
On the Run: Trilogy 1	Lucas Belvaux	Catherine Frot, Lucas Belvaux, Dominique Blanc	France; Belgium	Crime thriller
Ripley's Game	Liliana Cavani	John Malkovich, Dougray Scott, Ray Winstone	United Kingdom; Italy	Crime drama
Road to Perdition	Sam Mendes	Tom Hanks, Paul Newman, Jude Law	United States	
The Salton Sea	D.J. Caruso	Val Kilmer	United States	
Stark Raving Mad	David Schneider, Drew Daywalt	Seann William Scott, Lou Diamond Phillips, John Crye	United States	
State Property	Abdul Malik Abbott	Beanie Sigel, Omillio Sparks, Memphis Bleek, Damon Dash	United States	
Stealing Harvard	Bruce McCulloch	Chris Penn, Megan Mullally, John C. McGinley	United States	Crime comedy
Sympathy for Mr. Vengeance	Park Chan-wook	Song Kang-ho, Shin Ha-kyun, Bae Doona	South Korea	Crime thriller
The Transporter	Corey Yuen	Jason Statham, Shu Qi, François Berléand	United States; France	Crime thriller
Wash Dry and Spin Out	Dan Patton	Zoska Aleece, Nicole Areu, Randy Danner	United States	Crime drama
Welcome to Collinwood	Joe Russo, Anthony Russo	Luis Guzmán, Michael Jeter, Patricia Clarkson	United States	Crime comedy
