= List of crime films of 2005 =

This is a list of crime films released in 2005.

Title	Director	Cast	Country	Notes
A Bittersweet Life	Kim Jee-woon	Lee Byung-hun, Kim Yeong-cheol, Shin Min-ah	South Korea	
A History of Violence	David Cronenberg	Viggo Mortensen, Maria Bello, Ashton Holmes	Canada; United Kingdom	Crime thriller
Arsène Lupin	Jean-Paul Salome	Romain Duris, Kristin Scott Thomas, Pascal Greggory	Spain; Italy; France; United Kingdom	Master criminal film
The Beat That My Heart Skipped	Jacques Audiard	Romain Duris, Niels Arestrup, Linh-Dan Pham	France	Crime drama
Capote	Bennett Miller	Philip Seymour Hoffman, Catherine Keener, Clifton Collins, Jr.	United States	
Dead Man's Bluff	Alexei Balabanov		Russia	
Domino	Tony Scott	Keira Knightley, Mickey Rourke, Edgar Ramirez	United States	
Edison	David J. Burke	Kevin Spacey, Morgan Freeman, Justin Timberlake, LL Cool J	Canada; United States	Crime thriller
Election	Johnnie To	Simon Yam Tat-Wah, Tony Leung Ka-fai, Louis Koo Tin-Lok, Nick Cheung	Hong Kong	
Four Brothers	John Singleton	Mark Wahlberg, Tyrese Gibson, André Benjamin	United States	Crime drama
Fun with Dick and Jane	Dean Parisot	Jim Carrey, Téa Leoni, Alec Baldwin	United States	Crime comedy
The Ice Harvest	Harold Ramis	John Cusack, Billy Bob Thornton, Connie Nielsen	United States	Crime comedy
Johnny Was	Mark Hammond	Vinnie Jones, Eriq La Salle, Roger Daltrey	Ireland; United Kingdom	Crime drama
Kiss Kiss Bang Bang	Shane Black	Robert Downey Jr., Val Kilmer, Michelle Monaghan	United States	Crime comedy
Lord of War	Andrew Niccol	Nicolas Cage, Jared Leto, Bridget Moynahan	United States	
Malevolence	Stevan Mena	Samantha Dark, Brandon Johnson, Heather Magee	United States	Crime thriller
The Man	Les Mayfield	Samuel L. Jackson, Eugene Levy, Luke Goss	United States	Crime comedy
Revolver	Guy Ritchie	Jason Statham, Ray Liotta	United Kingdom; France	
Sin City	Robert Rodriguez, Frank Miller	Jessica Alba, Devon Aoki, Alexis Bledel	United States	
State Property 2	Damon Dash	Beanie Sigel, Victor 'Noreaga' Santiago	United States	
Sympathy for Lady Vengeance	Park Chan-wook	Lee Young-ae, Choi Min-sik	South Korea	Crime drama
Tsotsi	Gavin Hood	Presley Chweneyagae, Terry Pheto	South Africa; United Kingdom	Crime drama
Wild Things 3: Diamonds in the Rough	Jay Lowi	Linden Ashby, Brad Johnson, Sandra McCoy	United States	Crime thriller
