= List of crime films of 2003 =

This is a list of crime films released in 2003.

Title	Director	Cast	Country	Notes
11:14	Greg Marcks	Henry Thomas, Blake Heron, Barbara Hershey	United States	Crime comedy
15	Royston Tan	Melvin Chen, Erick Chun, Melvin Lee	Singapore	Juvenile delinquency film
2 Fast 2 Furious	John Singleton	Paul Walker, Tyrese Gibson, Eva Mendes	United States	Crime thriller
9 Souls	Toshiaki Toyoda	Koji Chihara, Yoshio Harada, Itsuji Itao	Japan	Crime comedy
Bad Santa	Terry Zwigoff	Billy Bob Thornton, Tony Cox, Brett Kelly	United States	Crime comedy
The Big Bounce	George Armitage	Owen Wilson, Morgan Freeman, Gary Sinise	United States	
Boomer	Pyotr Buslov	Maksim Konovalov, Sergei Gorobchenko, Vladimir Vdovichenko	Russia	
Carandiru	Héctor Babenco	Luis Carlos Vasconcelos, Milhem Cortaz, Milton Goncalves	Brazil; Argentina	Prison film
Confidence	James Foley	Edward Burns, Rachel Weisz, Andy García	United States	
Cradle 2 the Grave	Andrzej Bartkowiak	Jet Li, DMX	United States	Master criminal film
Doble Juego	Alberto Durant	Fabrizio Aguilar, Carlos Alcántara, Mari Pili Barreda	Peru	Crime drama
Gettin' Square	Jonathan Teplitzky	Sam Worthington, David Wenham, Timothy Spall	Australia; United Kingdom	Crime comedy
Gigli	Martin Brest	Ben Affleck, Jennifer Lopez, Justin Bartha	United States	
Godforsaken	Pieter Kuijpers	Egbert-Jan Weeber, Tygo Gernandt, Angela Schijf	Netherlands	
High Times' Potluck	Alison Thompson	Frank Adonis, Bryant Carroll, Tommy Chong	United States	Crime comedy
How It All Went Down	Silvio Pollio	Silvio Pollio, Daniella Evangelista, Franco Valenti	Canada; United States	
I'll Sleep When I'm Dead	Mike Hodges	Clive Owen, Charlotte Rampling, Jonathan Rhys-Meyers	United States; United Kingdom	
Infernal Affairs II	Andrew Lau, Alan Mak	Anthony Wong, Eric Tsang, Carina Lau	Hong Kong	
Infernal Affairs III	Andrew Lau, Alan Mak	Tony Leung Chiu-Wai, Andy Lau, Leon Lai	Hong Kong; China	
The Italian Job	F. Gary Gray	Mark Wahlberg, Charlize Theron, Edward Norton	United States	
King of the Ants	Stuart Gordon	Chris L. McKenna, Kari Wührer, Daniel Baldwin	United States	
The Life of David Gale	Alan Parker		Germany; United Kingdom; United States	Crime drama
Matchstick Men	Ridley Scott	Nicolas Cage, Sam Rockwell, Alison Lohman	United States	
Memories of Murder	Bong Joon-ho	Song Kang-ho, Kim Sang-kyung	South Korea	
Monster	Patty Jenkins	Charlize Theron, Christina Ricci, Bruce Dern	United States	
National Security	Dennis Dugan	Martin Lawrence, Steve Zahn, Colm Feore	United States	Crime comedy
Nicotina	Hugo Rodríguez	Marta Belaustegui, Rosa María Bianchi, Daniel Jiménez Cacho	Mexico; Argentina	
Out of Time	Carl Franklin	Denzel Washington, Eva Mendes, Sanaa Lathan	United States	Crime thriller
Owning Mahowny	Richard Kwietniowski	Philip Seymour Hoffman, Minnie Driver, Maury Chaykin	United States; Canada; United Kingdom	Crime drama
Paper Soldiers	Damon Dash, David Daniel		United States	
Scorched	Gavin Grazer	Rachael Leigh Cook	United States	Criminal comedy
Shade	Damian Nieman	Stuart Townsend, Gabriel Byrne, Thandie Newton	United States	
Stander	Bronwen Hughes		South Africa	
S.W.A.T.	Clark Johnson	Samuel L. Jackson, Colin Farrell, Michelle Rodriguez	United States	Crime thriller
Veronica Guerin	Joel Schumacher	Cate Blanchett, Gerard McSorley	Ireland; United States	Crime thriller
Wonderland	James Cox	Val Kilmer, Kate Bosworth, Lisa Kudrow	United States	Crime drama
