= Claudia Soberón =

Mexican actress and singer (born 1977)

Claudia Soberón (Spanish pronunciation: [ˈklawðja soβeˈɾon]; born September 29, 1977) is a Mexican actress and singer.

== Biography ==
Born and raised in Mexico City, Soberón began singing in child musical groups and in 1988 won a national singing competition televised by Televisa and sponsored by Marinela.

After taking acting classes during her high school years, she eventually enrolled the "El Foro de Teatro Contemporaneo" drama academy in Mexico City. She studied dance, voice and theater with renowned artists as Ludwik Margules, Adriana Roel, Julieta Egurrola, Luisa Huertas and Fernando Torre Laphame and starred in such plays as David Mamet's Sexual Perversity in Chicago, Maria Frankenstein, Dario Fo's The Monologue of a Whore in a Lunatic Asylum and The Green Cockatoo. Her first TV role was in an episode of Golpe bajo in 2001, followed by appearances in series such as Cuando Seas Mia, Lo que callamos las mujeres and a recurring role in Amores, querer con alevosía.

Soberón made her feature film debut with Soba (2004), an independent drama where she played a teenager raped by a group of cops. After a successful festival tour in Europe, the movie was commercially released in Mexico in 2005.

She kept working as a singer throughout the years, recording jingles for TV commercials in Mexico and the US, backing vocals for commercial albums and performing live in several cultural events in Mexico, Spain and Italy.

Her other screen works include short films (including Anima, filmed in USA and produced by the American Film Institute), TV commercials (McDonald's, Mrs Baird's, among others) and episodic television for TVAzteca. She also starred in Telemundo's Historias y testigos: ¡Ni una muerta mas!, inspired by the true story of the numerous female homicides in Ciudad Juárez.

In 2008 she was reportedly cast in Alfonso Cuarón's Mexico 68 with Gael García Bernal and Diego Luna but the project never entered production. She later starred in the Italian independent movie The Bet and its subsequent web series, also starring Alfonso Cuarón, Heather Langenkamp, Lorenzo Balducci as themselves.

She's been working as an interpreter and journalist in Europe for several years.

== Filmography ==
=== Film ===
| Year | Title | Role | Notes |
|---|---|---|---|
| 1997 | Adela despierta despierta | Alquemist Assistant | short film |
| 2003 | Anima | Sor Angelica | short film Produced by the American Film Institute |
| 2004 | Historias y testigos: ¡Ni una muerta mas! | Manuela | TV movie |
| 2005 | Soba | Justina | |
| 2007 | The Bet | Charisma Andersen | |
| 2013 | Reflection | Mary | short film |

=== Television ===
| Year | Title | Role | Notes |
|---|---|---|---|
| 1999 | Fin | Fire girl | Music Video for Jaguares |
| 2000 | Golpe bajo | Young Woman | 1 episode |
| 2001 | Cuando seas mía | Lucero | 3 episodes |
| 2001 | Amores, querer con alevosía | Claudia | 11 episodes |
| 2002 | Lo que callamos las mujeres | Various | 2 episodes |
| 2005 | La vida es una canción | Various | 3 episodes |
| 2020 | The Bet – The Series | Charisma Andersen | Web Series; 3 episodes |

== Theatre ==
| Year | Title | Role | Notes |
|---|---|---|---|
| 1996 | La luna de la noche no es la luna | Las tres pisos | musical |
| 1998 | Sexual Perversity in Chicago | Deborah Soloman | |
| 1998 | The Green Cockatoo | Dame Severine | |
| 1999 | The Monk | Rosario | |
| 1999 | The Monologue of a Whore in a Lunatic Asylum | Monologue | |
| 1999 | Genesis | Monologue | |
| 2000 | Maria Frankenstein | Mary Shelley | |
| 2001 | Corpus in Statu | Singer | |
| 2005 | Pendragon: La Tierra sin un Rey | Igraine | |
