= List of crime films of 2007 =

This is a list of crime films released in 2007.

Title	Director	Cast	Country	Notes
Alpha Dog	Nick Cassavetes	Emile Hirsch, Justin Timberlake, Bruce Willis	United States	
American Gangster	Ridley Scott	Denzel Washington, Russell Crowe	United States	
Before the Devil Knows You're Dead	Sidney Lumet	Philip Seymour Hoffman, Ethan Hawke, Marisa Tomei	United States	
Cassandra's Dream	Woody Allen	Hayley Atwell, Colin Farrell, Sally Hawkins	France; United States	Crime thriller
City of Men	Paulo Morelli	Douglas Silva, Darlan Cunha, Jonathan Haagensen	Brazil	Crime drama
Eastern Promises	David Cronenberg	Viggo Mortensen, Naomi Watts, Vincent Cassel	United States; Canada; United Kingdom	Crime thriller
Fakers	Richard Janes	Matthew Rhys, Kate Ashfield, Tom Chambers	United Kingdom	Crime comedy
Flash Point	Wilson Yip	Donnie Yen, Louis Koo, Collin Chou	China; Hong Kong	Crime thriller
Fracture	Gregory Hoblit	Anthony Hopkins, Ryan Gosling, David Strathairn	United States; Germany	Crime thriller
Funny Games	Michael Haneke	Naomi Watts, Tim Roth, Michael Pitt	Italy; Germany; United Kingdom; France; United States	Crime thriller
The Gray Man	Scott Flynn	Patrick Bauchau, Jack Conley, John Aylward	United States	
The Lookout	Scott Frank	Joseph Gordon-Levitt, Jeff Daniels, Matthew Goode	United States	
The Magic Hour	Kōki Mitani	Kōichi Satō, Satoshi Tsumabuki, Eri Fukatsu	Japan	
No Country for Old Men	Ethan Coen, Joel Coen	Tommy Lee Jones, Javier Bardem, Josh Brolin	United States	Crime thriller
Ocean's Thirteen	Steven Soderbergh	George Clooney, Brad Pitt, Matt Damon	United States	
Outlaw	Nick Love	Sean Bean, Bob Hoskins, Danny Dyer	United Kingdom	
Public Enemy Number One	Jean-François Richet	Vincent Cassel, Cécile De France, Gérard Depardieu	Canada; France	
Rosario Tijeras	Emilio Maille	Flora Martínez, Unax Ugalde, Manolo Cardona	Colombia	
The Show Must Go On	Han Jae-rim	Song Kang-ho, Oh Dal-su	South Korea	
Smokin' Aces	Joe Carnahan	Ben Affleck, Andy García, Alicia Keys	United States	
Ten 'til Noon	Scott Storm	Alfonso Freeman	United States	Crime thriller
Thr3e	Robby Henson	Marc Blucas, Laura Jordan, Justine Waddell	United States	
Timecrimes	Nacho Vigalondo	Karra Elejalde, Barbara Goenaga, Nacho Vigalondo	Spain	Crime thriller
We Own the Night	James Gray	Joaquin Phoenix, Mark Wahlberg, Eva Mendes, Robert Duvall	United States	
You Kill Me	John Dahl	Ben Kingsley, Téa Leoni, Luke Wilson	United States	Crime comedy
Zodiac	David Fincher	Jake Gyllenhaal, Mark Ruffalo, Robert Downey Jr.	United States	Crime drama
