= List of crime films of 2009 =

This is a list of crime films released in 2009.

| Title | Director | Cast | Country | Notes |
|---|---|---|---|---|
| 44 Inch Chest | Malcolm Venville | Ray Winstone, Ian McShane, John Hurt | United Kingdom | Crime drama |
| A Prophet | Jacques Audiard | Tahar Rahim, Niels Arestrup, Adel Bencherif | Austria; France | Prison film |
| Angels & Demons | Ron Howard | Tom Hanks, Ayelet Zurer, Ewan McGregor | United States | Crime thriller |
| Armored | Nimród Antal | Matt Dillon, Jean Reno, Laurence Fishburne | United States | Crime thriller |
| Bad Lieutenant: Port of Call New Orleans | Werner Herzog | Nicolas Cage, Eva Mendes, Val Kilmer | United States | Crime drama |
| Bluebeard | Catherine Breillat | Dominique Thomas, Lola Créton, Daphné Baiwir | France | |
| The Boondock Saints II: All Saints Day | Troy Duffy | Norman Reedus, Sean Patrick Flanery, Billy Connolly | United States | |
| The Brothers Bloom | Rian Johnson | Rachel Weisz, Adrien Brody, Mark Ruffalo | United States | Crime comedy |
| Diamond 13 | Gilles Béat | Gérard Depardieu, Olivier Marchal, Asia Argento | Luxembourg; France; Belgium | |
| Fighting | Dito Montiel | Channing Tatum, Terrence Howard | United States | Crime drama |
| The Girl Who Played with Fire | Daniel Alfredson | Noomi Rapace, Michael Nyqvist, Annika Hallin | Sweden | |
| The Informant! | Steven Soderbergh | Matt Damon, Scott Bakula, Joel McHale | United States | |
| Killshot | John Madden | Diane Lane, Mickey Rourke, Johnny Knoxville | United States | Crime thriller |
| Law Abiding Citizen | F. Gary Gray | Jamie Foxx, Gerard Butler, Colm Meaney | United States | |
| The Limits of Control | Jim Jarmusch | Isaach de Bankolé, Hiam Abbass, Gael García Bernal | United States | |
| OSS 117: Lost in Rio | Michel Hazanavicius | Jean Dujardin, Louise Monot | France | Spy comedy |
| Le Premier Cercle | Laurent Tuel | Jean Reno, Gaspard Ulliel, Vahina Giocante | Italy; France | |
| Public Enemies | Michael Mann | Johnny Depp, Christian Bale, Marion Cotillard | United States | |
| Shinjuku Incident | Derek Yee | Jackie Chan, Naoto Takenaka, Daniel Wu | Hong Kong; Japan | Crime drama |
| Staten Island | James DeMonaco | Ethan Hawke, Vincent D'Onofrio, Seymour Cassel | France; United States | Crime drama |
| Vengeance | Johnnie To | Johnny Hallyday, Anthony Wong, Lam Ka-Tung | France; Hong Kong | Crime thriller |
