= List of crime films of 2006 =

This is a list of crime films released in 2006.

| Title | Director | Cast | Country | Notes |
|---|---|---|---|---|
| .45 | Gary Lennon | Milla Jovovich | United States | Crime thriller |
| The Black Dahlia | Brian De Palma | Josh Hartnett, Scarlett Johansson, Aaron Eckhart | Germany; United States | |
| Cargo | Clive Gordon | Peter Mullan, Daniel Brühl, Luis Tosar | Sweden; Spain; United Kingdom | |
| The Da Vinci Code | Ron Howard | Tom Hanks, Audrey Tautou, Ian McKellen | United States | Crime thriller |
| The Departed | Martin Scorsese | Leonardo DiCaprio, Matt Damon, Jack Nicholson | United States | |
| Le deuxième souffle | Alain Corneau | Daniel Auteuil, Monica Bellucci, Michel Blanc | France | |
| Exiled | Johnnie To | Anthony Wong, Nick Cheung, Simon Yam, Francis Ng | China; Hong Kong | |
| Firewall | Richard Loncraine | Harrison Ford | United States | Crime thriller |
| Harsh Times | David Ayer | Christian Bale, Freddy Rodriguez, Eva Longoria | United States | |
| Idlewild | Bryan Barber | André Benjamin, Antwan Andre Patton, Paula Patton | United States | |
| Inside Man | Spike Lee | Denzel Washington, Clive Owen, Jodie Foster | United States | |
| Killa Season | Cameron Giles | Juelz Santana, Cam'ron | United States | Crime drama |
| Little Man | Keenen Ivory Wayans | Marlon Wayans, Shawn Wayans, Kerry Washington | United States | Crime comedy |
| Lucky Number Slevin | Paul McGuigan | Josh Hartnett, Morgan Freeman, Ben Kingsley | United States | |
| Miami Vice | Michael Mann | Colin Farrell, Jamie Foxx, Gong Li | United States | |
| Played | Sean Stanek | Val Kilmer, Gabriel Byrne, Vinnie Jones | United Kingdom | |
| The Right of the Weakest | Lucas Belvaux | Eric Caravaca, Natacha Régnier, Lucas Belvaux | Belgium; France | Caper |
| Rob-B-Hood | Benny Chan | Jackie Chan, Louis Koo, Michael Hui | China; Hong Kong | Crime comedy |
| Running Scared | Wayne Kramer | Paul Walker | Germany; United States | Crime thriller |
| Tazza: The High Rollers | Choi Dong-hoon | Cho Seung-woo, Baek Yoon-sik, Kim Hye-soo | South Korea | Crime drama |
| The Sentinel | Clark Johnson | Michael Douglas, Kiefer Sutherland, Eva Longoria | United States | |
| Triad Election | Johnnie To | Simon Yam, Louis Koo | Hong Kong | Crime thriller |
