= List of LGBTQ-related films of 1976 =

This is a list of lesbian, gay, bisexual or transgender-related films released in 1976. It contains theatrically released films that deal with important gay, lesbian, bisexual, or transgender characters or issues and may have same-sex romance or relationships as a plot device.

== Films ==
Title	Director	Country	Genre	Cast	Notes
The Best Way to Walk	Claude Miller	France	Drama	Patrick Dewaere, Patrick Bouchitey, Christine Pascal, Claude Piéplu, Marc Chapiteau, Michel Blanc, Michel Such, Franck d'Ascanio and Nathan Miller	a.k.a. La meilleure façon de marcher
Car Wash	Michael Schultz	United States	Comedy	Franklyn Ajaye, Sully Boyar, Richard Brestoff, George Carlin, Irwin Corey, Ivan Dixon, Bill Duke, Antonio Fargas, Lauren Jones, Michael Fennell, Arthur French, Lorraine Gary, Darrow Igus, Leonard Jackson, DeWayne Jessie (a.k.a. Otis Day), Jack Kehoe, Henry Kingi, Melanie Mayron, Garrett Morris, Clarence Muse, Leon Pinkney, The Pointer Sisters, Richard Pryor, Tracy Reed, Pepe Serna, James Spinks, Ray Vitte, Renn Woods, Brooke Adams, Antonie Becker, Danny DeVito, Antar Mubarak, Otis Sistrunk and Tim Thomerson	
Change of Sex	Vicente Aranda	Spain	Drama	Victoria Abril, Lou Castel, Fernando Sancho, Rafaela Aparicio and Bibi Andersen	a.k.a. Cambio de Sexo
A Child in the Crowd	Gérard Blain	France	Drama	Jean François Cimino, César Chauveau, Annie Kovaks, Cécile Cousseau, Claude Treille, Jean Bertal, Gabrielle Sassoum, Raymonde Badé-Mauffroy (as Raymonde Mauffroy), Jacques Benoît-Lévy, Claude Cernay, Jurgens Doeres and Bernard Soufflet	
Coup de Grâce	Volker Schlöndorff	West Germany; France	Drama, war	Matthias Habich, Margarethe von Trotta, Rüdiger Kirschstein, Marc Eyraud, Bruno Thost, Henry van Lyck, Hannes Kaetner, Franz Morak, Frederik von Zichy, Mathieu Carrière, Valeska Gert, Alexander von Eschwege, Maria Guttenbrunner and Stephan Paryla	Based on the novel of the same name by Marguerite Yourcenar
Drum	Steve Carver	United States	Drama	Warren Oates, Isela Vega, Ken Norton	
In the Realm of the Senses	Nagisa Oshima	Japan	Drama	Eiko Matsuda, Tatsuya Fuji, Aoi Nakajima, Yasuko Matsui, Meika Seri, Kanae Kobayashi, Taiji Tonoyama, Kyôji Kokonoe, Naomi Shiraishi and Komikichi Hori	
Insaciable	Armando Bó	Argentina	Drama	Isabel Sarli, Jorge Barreiro, Santiago Gómez Cou	a.k.a. The Insatiable Widow
Je t'aime moi non-plus	Serge Gainsbourg	France	Drama	Jane Birkin, Joe Dallesandro, Hugues Quester, Reinhard Kolldehoff (credited as René Kolldehoff), Gérard Depardieu, Jimmy Davis (credited as Jimmy 'Lover Man' Davis), Maïté Nahyr, Liliane Rovère, Gillian Gill, Josiane Lévêque, Doris Thomas, Raoul Delfosse, Michel Blanc, Alain David and Claudia Butenuth	
Johan	Philippe Vallois	France	Drama	Marie-Christine Weill, Patrice Pascal, Philippe Vallois, Laurent Laclos, Pierre Commoy, Manolo Rosales, Philippe Dupeux, Karl Forest, Alexandre Grecq (as Alexandre Grecque), Thierry Loret, Jacques Léon, Walter Manley, Jean Claude Vincent, Nicole Rondy and Éric Guadagnan	
Next Stop, Greenwich Village	Paul Mazursky	United States	Comedy, drama	Lenny Baker, Shelley Winters, Ellen Greene, Lois Smith, Christopher Walken (credited as Chris Walken), Antonio Fargas, Mike Kellin, Lou Jacobi, Dori Brenner, Jeff Goldblum, Rashel Novikoff, Michael Egan, Bill Murray (uncredited), Joe Spinell, Stuart Pankin (uncredited) and Vincent Schiavelli	
Nightmare in Badham County	John Llewellyn Moxey	United States	Drama	Chuck Connors, Deborah Raffin, Fionnula Flanagan, Robert Reed	
Norman... Is That You?	George Schlatter	United States	Comedy	Redd Foxx, Pearl Bailey, Dennis Dugan, Michael Warren, Tamara Dobson, Vernee Watson-Johnson, Jayne Meadows, George Furth, Sergio Aragonés, Sosimo Hernandez, Wayland Flowers and Allan Drake	Co-written by Ron Clark and Sam Bobrick, based on their play Norman, Is That You?
Ode to Billy Joe	Max Baer Jr.	United States	Drama	Robby Benson, Glynnis O'Connor	Based on the song "Ode to Billie Joe" by Bobbie Gentry
The Ritz	Richard Lester	United States	Comedy	Jack Weston, Rita Moreno, Jerry Stiller, Kaye Ballard, F. Murray Abraham, Paul B. Price, Treat Williams, John Everson, Christopher J. Brown, Dave King and Bessie Love	Screenplay by Terrence McNally, based on his play of the same name
Sebastiane	Paul Humfress, Derek Jarman	United Kingdom	Drama, thriller	Barney James, Neil Kennedy, Leonardo Treviglio, Richard Warwick, Donald Dunham, Daevid Finbar, Ken Hicks, Lindsay Kemp, Steffano Massari, Janusz Romanov, Gerald Incandela and Robert Medley	
The War Widow	Paul Bogart	United States	Drama	Pamela Bellwood, Frances Lee McCain, Tim Matheson	TV movie about lesbian love affair
