= La Musica =

La Musica may refer to:

- La Musica (music festival), a chamber music festival in Sarasota, Florida
- La Musica (film), a 1967 French drama film
