= Vance Martin =

American conservationist

Vance G. Martin
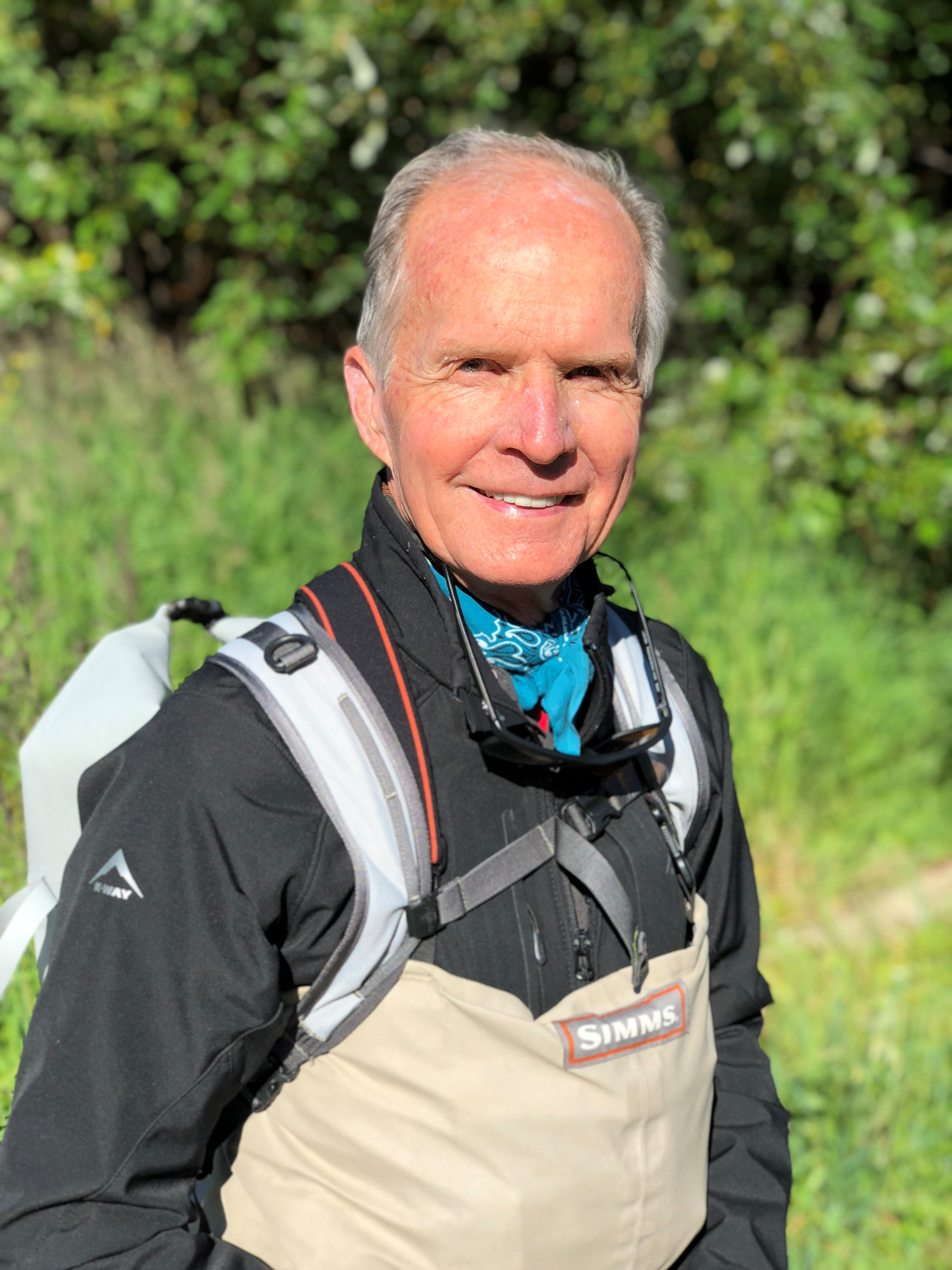
- Martin in Katmai National Park (August, 2018)
- Born: July 20, 1949 (age 77); Washington, D.C., U.S.
- Occupations: Past President of The WILD Foundation 1983-2022. President Emeritus, Wilderness Foundation Global 2020-present
- Years active: 1983-present

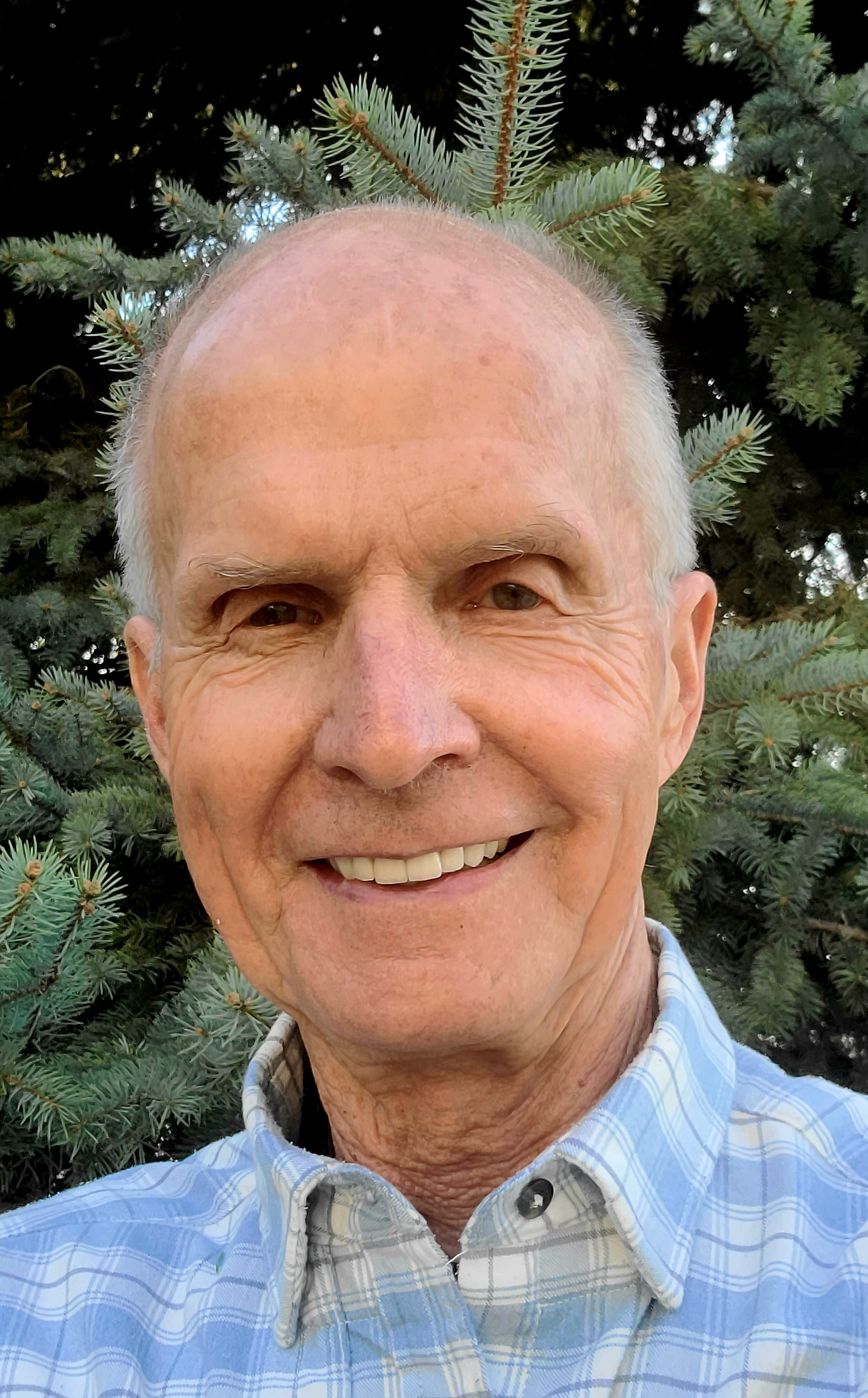
Vance G Martin (courtesy IUCN)

Vance G. Martin (born July 20, 1949) is an agent in international nature conservation and wilderness protection, and a writer. Martin specializes in bridging the interests of people and nature through culture, communications, science, and policy. He has worked and lived in many countries, 75 or more, and served on the boards of numerous conservation and business organizations. He founded, and from 1984 through 2022, served as President (and on the Board of Directors) of the WILD Foundation, an international conservation organization explicitly dedicated to protecting wilderness, connecting wild nature to people, and to communicating the values of wilderness and its benefits for human communities. He currently works through Wilderness Foundation Global, an international alliance based in the Global South (Cape Town, South Africa) that he co-founded in 2016. He is based in Boulder, Colorado (USA).

== Early life ==
Vance G. Martin (full name Vance Gregory Martin) was born July 20, 1949, in Washington, D.C., to Alyce Dickerson Martin, (deceased, 2013), and Thomas O. Martin, (deceased, 1994, a 25 year veteran of the FBI). He grew up mostly throughout the Maryland/Virginia/West Virginia area of the United States. He spent his free time in the forests and fields of the Piedmont Region, and later (during university) in the Appalachian Mountains. In 1971, he graduated Magna Cum Laude from West Virginia University with a Bachelor of Arts in English literature and minor studies in forestry and wildlife management.

After university, Martin lived and worked abroad in Asia and Europe for 13 years, including 10 years at The Findhorn Foundation in Scotland (a UK-registered, educational charitable trust) as a senior manager and (sic) Director of Environmental Programs. During this time he met and began to work closely with author/explorer Sir Laurens van der Post and South African, international conservationist Dr. Ian Player. His life-long interest in nature conservation and traditional peoples developed into a professional, working commitment to understand, protect and communicate wilderness values and the irreplaceable role of wilderness and traditional cultures in a healthy modern society.

He currently lives in Boulder, Colorado (USA). He has two grown children and one granddaughter. His personal interests are wild nature, trees, fly-fishing, oriental carpets, photography, and antique trade beads.

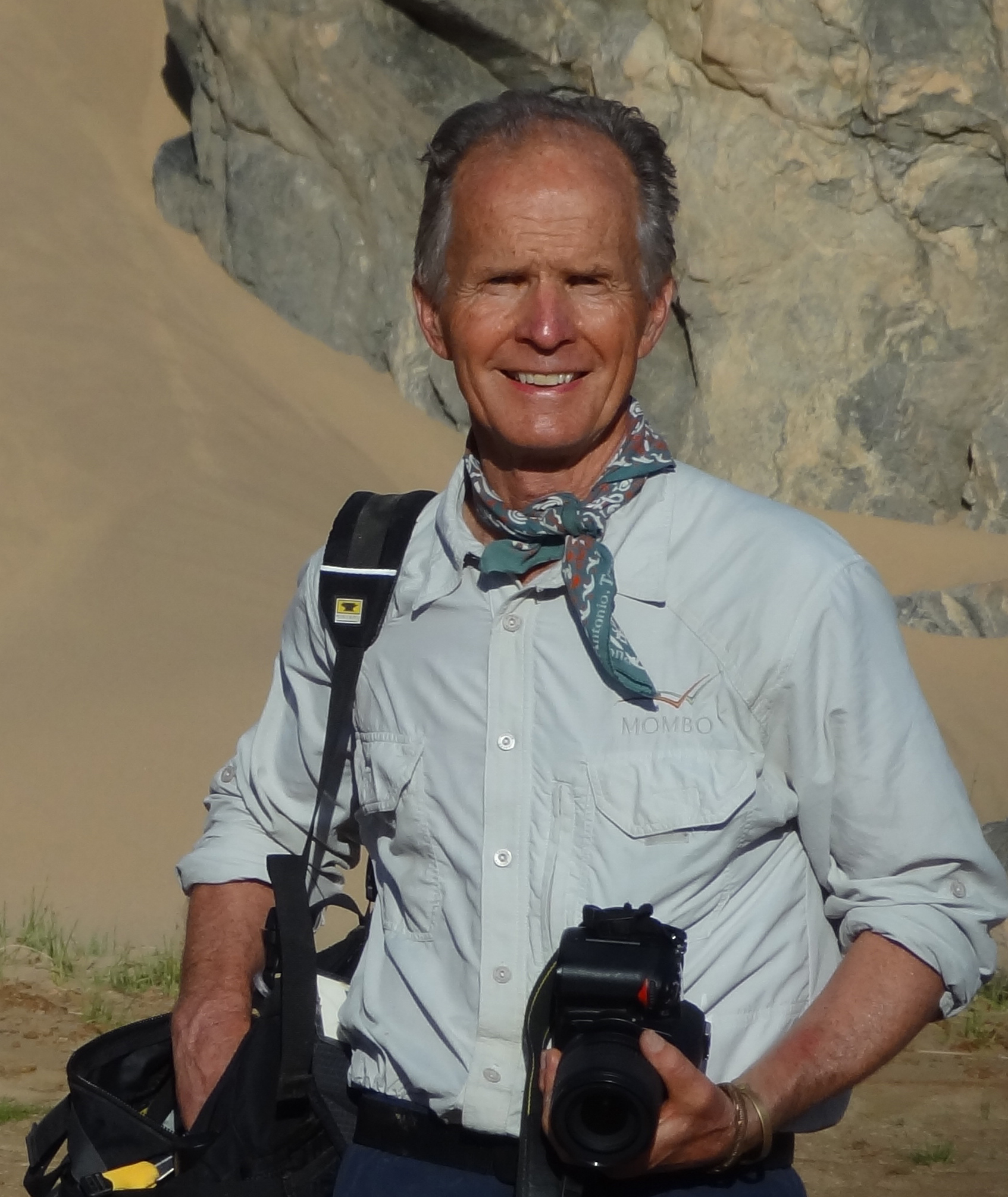
Courtesy of Nick Chevalier, South Africa, 2012

Prior to working for WILD and while gaining his university degree, Martin was co-owner of Natural Foods Store, the first organic and natural foods store in northern West Virginia, Martin also co-owned an antique and artisanal crafts import business. Beginning in 1974, he spent 10 years with The Findhorn Foundation in Scotland. There he developed his skills for non-profit management alongside furthering his wilderness ethic, land management experience, and his understanding of how the human world interfaces with the natural world. During his years at Findhorn, Martin served at varying times as (sic) Executive Director; Director of gardens, farms, and landscaping; Director of environmental programs; Founder/Director of Trees for Life, a social movement for growing and planting trees; as Warden (custodian) of Traigh Bhan on the island of Iona, in the Inner Hebrides; on the Core (central policy) Group, in the Education Department; and on the Management Committee.

== Conservation career ==
Martin was President of the WILD Foundation from 1983-2023, a leading program and financial development for a conservation NGO that was established by South African conservationist Dr. Ian Player in 1974. His work was primarily focused on fundraising, program strategy, and management for WILD, frequently traveling between headquarters in Colorado with WILD projects and affiliated organizations around the world. Martin works extensively in Africa, Europe, Asia, Australia, Russia, and the Americas to foster the understanding, policy, and action needed to protect and sustain wild nature while meeting the needs of human communities. His work brings him into all sectors of society from the government and corporate world to academics, the arts, local communities, and native/indigenous cultures.

A key moment in Martin's career was his central role in conceiving, initiating, and managing the first international agreement on wilderness signed by the governments of Canada, United States, and Mexico in November, 2009, at WILD9 (9th World Wilderness Congress) (Memorandum of Understanding on Cooperation for Wilderness and Protected Areas Conservation). At that same time, he also co-conceived and launched the Nature Needs Half vision and practice with his friend and colleague Harvey Locke.

Between 1992 and 2002, Martin closely collaborated with Dr Laurie Marker to establish and expand the Cheetah Conservation Fund, based in Namibia. He served as its President for 10 years and remains on the Board of Trustees. CCF is recognized as the premier global initiative to protect the endangered wild cheetah, and has become one of the most successful and far-reaching species-oriented field projects in the world.

Martin was the International Director of the World Wilderness Congress (WWC) from 1983-2023, as well as the executive editor for all its publications. The WWC has been described as the Olympics of the wilderness conservation world. Approximately every four years in a different country, the WWC convenes a diverse convergence of leaders in international conservation, government, science, the arts and humanities, communications, and business with the public to: achieve practical conservation results; strengthen constructive dialogue and positive action on important environmental issues; promote a greater understanding of wilderness; and enhance the protection of wildlands and seas. Established in South Africa in 1977, this is the world's longest-running, international, public conservation project and environmental forum. The “WILD10” process, of which Martin was Co-Chair, took place in Europe and convened in Salamanca, Spain, in October 2013.

In addition to his work with WILD (where he also is on the Board of Directors), Martin has served on the board of directors of numerous other organizations including the Cheetah Conservation Fund (of which he was President for 10 years); Wilderness Foundation (Africa); Wilderness Foundation (UK); Conservation & Preservation Charities of America (President, 6 years); Friends of Peace Parks (President); International Conservation Caucus Foundation; SAVM, LLC.; and Fulcrum Publishing, Inc. He is also the founder and current co-chairman of the Wilderness Specialist Group of the World Commission on Protected Areas of the IUCN; Fellow, Findhorn Foundation (Scotland); member, International Advisory Council, EcoForum Global (China); Research Fellow, Yancheng Coastal Wetlands Research Institute (China); and Expert Advisor, Anshun Huangguoshu World Cultural and Natural Heritage Declaration (China).

== Collaborations ==
Dedicated to collaboration and cooperation as an effective means of empowering a wider social movement for nature conservation, Martin has helped initiate or worked closely with others to foster many new projects and organizations. The significant collaborations include: International Conservation Caucus Foundation (with David H. Baron), Earth Vision Institute (with James Balog), documentary films Chasing Ice and Chasing Coral (with Jeff Orlowski and James Balog); and founding member of the Nature Needs Half Steering Committee (2015).

Martin is committed to the critical role of human culture as a necessary and effective force in nature conservation, and in creating solutions across boundaries and ideologies. Central to this is his dedication to working with Indigenous Peoples (IP) and local communities to assure respect and rightful regard for their knowledge, rights, and cultural practices. As well as working with traditional communities, elders and leaders in Africa, Asia, and North and South America, he co-founded the Native Lands and Wilderness Council with Terry Tanner of the Confederated Salish and Kootenai Tribes (2005); co-founded with Sharon Shay Sloan the Indigenous and Community Lands and Seas project (2013); and continues to work very closely with Chief Tashka Yawanawa and his people in the far Western Amazon.

As a lifetime advocate of the arts and humanities as a key tool for effective nature conservation, Martin fostered (among many initiatives) the founding of the International League of Conservation Photographers with Cristina Mittermeier (2005), the International League of Conservation Writers (with Bob Baron of Fulcrum Publishing); initiated and co-produced the innovative Rap Guide to Wilderness (2014), with Canadian artist, Baba Brinkman; and co-produced with Patricio Robles Gil the performance art piece, Wild Rituals, Painted Bodies at the 9th World Wilderness Congress (2009, Mexico)

== Awards and accomplishments ==
- Fred Packard Award for Outstanding service to Protected Areas, presented at the 12th World Wilderness Congress (WILD12), He Sapa, Black Hills, South Dakota, USA, August, 2024
- Co-Founder; Executive Committee (Board of Trustees) of Wilderness Foundation Global (2015)
- Member, 2015, Clinton Global Initiative
- Founding Member, 2015, Rewilding Europe Circle Embajadore de Salamanca (2013)
- First French-language book on wilderness law and policy, 2013 (Ed. Cyril Kormos)
- Bob Marshall Award for Group Champion of wilderness Stewardship (on behalf of The WILD Foundation); presented by the Chief, US Department of Agriculture Forest Service, 2011
- Initiated Mali Elephant Project to protect desert elephants of central Mali (West Africa), now directed by Dr. Susan Canney and Nomba Ganame, successfully withstanding jihadist war and empowering local communities (2003–Present)
- Launched Nature Needs Half, a global conservation vision and practice, with Harvey Locke, 2009
- Co-sponsored and participated in Trans-Africa expedition Tracks of Giants, 2012
- First international agreement on wilderness, signed by the governments of Canada, the US, and Mexico in November 2009 at WILD9; Memorandum of Understanding on Cooperation for Wilderness and Protected Areas Conservation
- First Spanish-language book on wilderness law and policy, 2009 (Ed. Cyril Kormos)
- “Area of Bi-National Environmental Interest” "Big Bend & Rio Bravo" between Texas and Mexico, initiated in Mexico with Patricio Robles Gil in 2008, signed in November 2011 by US ( Secretary of Interior) and Mexico (Minister of Environment).
- First International Handbook on Wilderness Law and Policy (Kormos, 2008)
- Wilderness Champion, United States Department of Agriculture, Forest Service, 2002
- Native Lands and Wilderness Council (established 2005), with Terry Tanner (Confederated Salish and Kootenai)
- Global Award, World Wilderness Foundation, India, 1998
- First Global Wilderness Inventory (McCloskey and Spaulding, 1987)
- Fellow, Explorer's Club (New York); 2003–Present

== Publications and other media ==
Martin serves as an editor for numerous wilderness and conservation-related reference publications, including the contributing editor for the International Journal of Wilderness (1994–present), contributing editor (international) for three editions of Wilderness Management, (the standard international reference), as well as a handbook on International Wilderness Law and Policy, Una Introducción al Derecho y las Políticas Internacionales Sobre Áreas Silvestres, and Une introduction au driot et aux politiques internationales de la nature sauvage. Martin is listed in the Who's Who in Service to the Earth, Who's Who in the West, and numerous other references. His most recent book (2009) is a personal memoir Wilderness (with photographs by Patricio Robles Gil and introduction by Ian Player), ISBN 978-607-00-1522-9.

=== Books ===
- Casson, Sarah A.; Martin, Vance G. et al. Wilderness Protected Areas: Management guidelines for IUCN Category 1b protected areas. Gland, Switzerland: IUCN., 2016. Updated 2017. ISBN 978-2-8317-1817-0. Print.
- Martin, Vance and Sloan, Sharon Shay ed. Protecting Wild Nature on Native Lands: Case Studies by Native Peoples from around the World. Volume II. Golden Colo:Fulcrum Pub. 2012. Print (Spanish Language Edition in digital print)
- Martin, Vance, and Patricio Robles Gil (photographer). Wilderness. Mexico City, MX; Sierra Madre. 2009. ISBN 978-607-00-1522-9. Print
- Martin, Vance, and Patricio Robles Gil (photographer). Tierras Silvestres. Mexico City, MX; Sierra Madre. 2009. ISBN 978-607-00-1395-9. Print
- Martin, Vance, and Cyril Kormos, ed. Wilderness, Wildlands and People: A Partnership for the Planet. Golden Colo: Fulcrum Pub. 2008. ISBN 978-1-55591-602-2. Print.
- Martin, Vance, Cajune, Julie, Tanner, Terry. ed. Protecting Wild Nature on Native Lands: Case Studies by Native Peoples from around the World. Volume I. Golden Colo:Fulcrum Pub. 2008. ISBN 978-1-55591-681-7. Print (English and Spanish Editions)
- Martin, Vance, and Andrew Muir, ed. Wilderness and Human Communities: The Spirit of the 21st Century. Golden, Colo.: Fulcrum Pub., 2004. ISBN 1-55591-866-2. Print.
- Gil, Patricio Robles, Russell A. Mittermeier, Cristina G. Mittermeier, Vance G. Martin, et al.. Wilderness: Earth's Last Wild Places. [Mexico City]: CEMEX, 2002. Print.
- Martin, Vance G, ed. Wilderness & Humanity: The Global Issue. Golden, Colo.: Fulcrum Publ., 2001. ISBN 1-55591-989-8. Print.
- Martin, Vance, and Nicholas Tyler, ed. Arctic Wilderness. Golden, Colo.: North American, 1995. ISBN 1-55591-931-6. Print.
- Martin, Vance, ed. For the Conservation of Earth. Golden, Colo.: Fulcrum,, 1988. ISBN 1-55591-026-2. Print.
- Martin, Vance, and Mary Inglis, ed. Wilderness, the Way Ahead. The Park, Forres, Scotland: Findhorn, 1984. ISBN 0-905249-58-5 (UK); 0936878-10-X (USA). Print.
- Martin, Vance, ed. Wilderness. Findhorn, Moray, Scotland: Findhorn Press, 1982. ISBN 0-906191-61-0. Print.

=== Articles and papers ===
- Martin, Vance G.; Canney, Susan PhD. "The desert elephants of Mali." The Last Elephants. (2019): 425-437. Print.
- Martin, Vance G. "Wilderness in the Story of Eco-civilization." Embrace the New Era of Eco-Civilization. (2018): 73-76. Print.
- Dinerstein et al. "An Ecoregion-Based Approach to Protecting Half the Terrestrial Realm." Bio-Science. 67.6. (2017): 534-545. Print.
- Martin, Vance G.; ZHANG, Qian; Lewis, Amy "Wilderness in Eco-civilization - Protection, Management, and Communications." ECO - The New Era of Ecological Civilization. July. (2018): 73-76. Print.
- Martin, Vance G.; YANG, Rui; CAO, Yue "To Establish a Chinese Wilderness Preservation System as an Essential Part of Eco-civilization." ECO - The New Era of Ecological Civilization. July. (2018): 83-90. Print.
- Martin, Vance G.; Translated by ZHANG, Qian "Wilderness - International Perspectives and the China Opportunity." Chinese Landscape Architecture. 33.258.06. (2017): 5-9. Print.
- Canney, Susan PhD.; Martin, Vance G. "A Grassroots Battle to Save Mali's Elephants." AR3. Q4 (2016): 27-30. Print.
- Casson, Sarah; Martin, Vance G. "Wilderness at an International Scale." International Journal of Wilderness 22.3 (2016): 35-41. Print.
- Dawson, Chad P.; Martin, Vance G. "A Tribute to John C. Hendee." International Journal of Wilderness 22.3 (2016): 4-10. Print.
- Martin, Vance G. "Wildnis International" Ballett + Wildnis: Projekt Zur Kultur Der Natur - 10 Jahre (Idee und Konzept, Till Meyer, Eine Kooperation des Bayerischen Staatsballetts, mit dem Bayerischen Staatsministerium fur Umwelt und Verbraucherschutz), (2015) 105-106 Print.
- Martin, Vance G. and Muir, Andrew "A Tribute to Ian Player - Global Wilderness Conservation Icon" International Journal of Wilderness 21.1 (2015): 4. Print and on-line.
- Martin, Vance G. "The US Wilderness Act: Its History, Impact, Future Role in Growing a Global Wilderness Community" Celebrating the 50th Anniversary of The Wilderness Act, The National Wilderness Conference Proceedings (Albuquerque, NM, US, October 2014) abstract 158 Print and on-line
- Martin, Vance G. "Nature Needs Half - A Vision and a Practice" The Geographer (Royal Scottish Geographical Society), (Winter 2014-15): 17 Print and on-line.
- Martin, Vance G. "Ian Player - A Personal Reflection." Sanctuary Asia, (February 2015): 32-35. Print and on-line.
- Martin, Vance G., Hill, Melanie. "Make the World a Wilder Place." International Journal of Wilderness 20.2 (2014): 4. Print and on-line.
- Martin, Vance G., Randall, Julie A. "Social HALF." International Journal of Wilderness 19.2 (2013): 4. Print and on-line
- Martin, Vance G. "Go Wild... For a Change." Sanctuary Asia, February 2013 (2013): 26-28. Print and on-line.
- Dudley N.; Kormos C.; Locke H.; Martin V. “Defining Wilderness in IUCN.” International Journal of Wilderness 18.1 (2012):1. Print and on-line.
- Martin, Vance G. “WILD10 and Nature Needs Half.” International Journal of Wilderness 17.3 (2011): 3. Print and on-line.
- Martin, Vance G. “The Story”. An Introduction to “Reflections of a Wilderness Man” by Ian Player (2011) Print
- Martin, Vance G. "The 9th World Wilderness Congress: Mexico, 2009." International Journal of Wilderness 16.1 (2010): 47-42. Print.
- Martin, Vance G. "Nature Needs Half." Sanctuary Asia, December 2010 (2010): 65-66. Print and on-line.
- Watson, Alan; Martin, Vance; Lin, Chau Chin. 2009. Wilderness: an international community knocking on Asia's door. Journal of National Park (Taiwan) 19(4):1-9. Print and On-line.
- Martin, Vance G. "Wilderness in a Word ? or Two ? or More." International Journal of Wilderness 15.2 (2009): 3-3. Print.
- Martin, Vance G. "9th World Wilderness Congress in 2009." International Journal of Wilderness 14.3 (2008): 36-36. Print.
- Martin, Vance G. "Wilderness -- The Strategic Element in Our Response to Global Environmental Change." International Journal of Wilderness 14.2 (2008): 25-25. Print.
- Martin, Vance G. "Wilderness Is on the Move!" International Journal of Wilderness 14.1 (2008): 3-3. Print.
- Martin, Vance G.; Cyril F. Kormos; Franco Zunino; Till Meyer; Ulf Doerner;Toby Aykroyd. "Wilderness Momentum in Europe." International Journal of Wilderness 14.2 (2008): 34-38. Print.
- Martin, Vance G.; Cyril F. Kormos; Russell A. Mittermeier; John D. Pilgrim; Michael Hoffmann. "The Role for Wilderness in Biodiversity Conservation." The Wild Planet Project (2007): 38-40. Print.
- Martin, Vance G. "The WILD Foundation: Working for Wilderness, Wildlife, and People Since 1974." The Wild Planet Project (2007): 2-7. Print.
- Kormos, Cyril F., Vance G. Martin. "Private Sector Wilderness: An Important New Direction." The Wild Planet Project (2007): 47-48. Print.
- Martin, Vance G. "Wilderness Is a Bipartisan Cause." International Journal of Wilderness 12.3 (2006): 3-3. Print.
- Martin, Vance G. "8th World Wilderness Congress Generates Conservation Results." International Journal of Wilderness 11.3 (2005): 26-29. Print.
- Martin, Vance G. "The 8th World Wilderness Congress: Alaska and Siberia." International Journal of Wilderness 10.1 (2004): 39-40. Print.
- Martin, Vance G., Cyril Kormos. "Support Is Building for Global Wilderness Conservation." International Journal of Wilderness 9.2 (2003): 4-8. Print.
- Martin, Vance G. "The 7th World Wilderness Congress: Wilderness and Human Communities." International Journal of Wilderness 8.1 (2002): 4-9. Print.
- Martin, Vance G. "Wilderness: It's Got Soul." International Journal of Wilderness 8.2 (2002): 3-3. Print.
- Martin, Vance G. "Ian Player: Madolo." International Journal of Wilderness 7.3 (2001): 10-11. Print.
- Martin, Vance G. "The World Wilderness Congress." International Journal of Wilderness 7.1 (2001): 4-9. Print.
- Martin, Vance G. "The Wildest Issue." International Journal of Wilderness 6.1 (2000): 3-3. Print.
- Martin, Vance G. "The Trail Ahead." International Journal of Wilderness 4.1 (1998): 3-3. Print.
- Martin, Vance G. "India Hosts 6th World Wilderness Congress." International Journal of Wilderness 4.3 (1998): 3-3. Print.
- Martin, Vance G. "Remembering Our Friends and Heroes." International Journal of Wilderness 3.3 (1997): 48-48. Print.
- Martin, Vance G. "Remembering Sir Laurens Van Der Post." International Journal of Wilderness 3.2 (1997): 48-48. Print.
- Martin, Vance G. "Australia's Wilderness Movement - Gathering Momentum." International Journal of Wilderness 2.1 (1996): 10-13. Print.
- Martin, Vance G., Cooper, Trygve G, ed. "International Status of Wilderness" and "Wilderness in Namibia: The WILD Foundation Perspective" Wilderness Management Symposium, The Ministry of Environment and Tourism (Waterberg Plateau Park, Namibia) (1996) 22 and 197. Print.
- McCloskey, Michael, Martin, Vance. "International Laws Governing Wilderness." Journal of Forestry 91.2 (1993): 35-35. Print.
- Stankey, G., Martin, V, and R. Nash. International Concepts of Wilderness Preservation and Management. In Wilderness Management, Hendee, et al. Golden, Colo.: North American Press (1990)
- Martin, Vance G. Numerous articles and publications through the Findhorn Press (1976-1984)
