= Anicée Alvina =

French singer and actress (1953–2006)

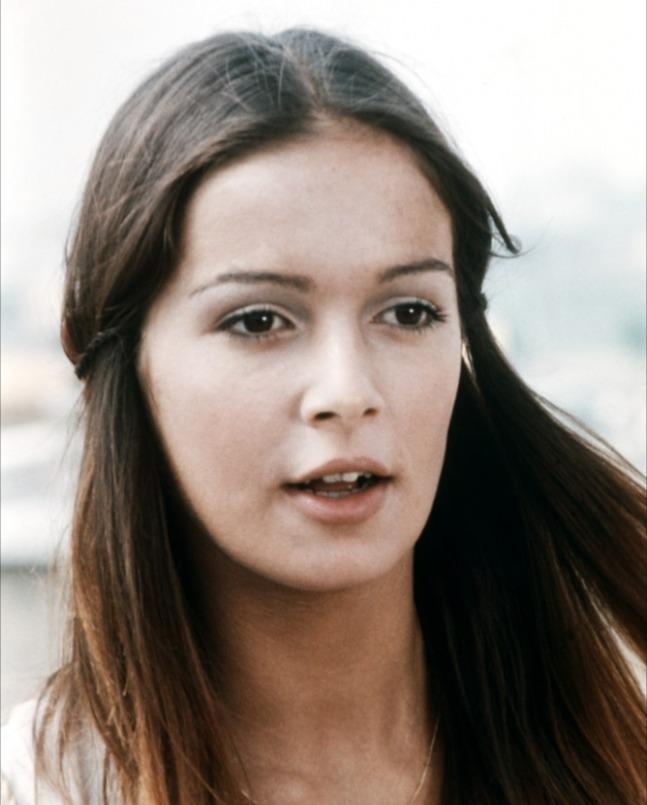
- Anicée Alvina
- Born: Anicée Shahmanesh; 28 January 1953; Boulogne-Billancourt, France
- Died: 11 November 2006 (aged 53); Paris, France
- Other names: Anicée Schahmaneche, Anicée Shahmanesh, Anicee Schahmane
- Occupations: Actress, singer

Anicée Alvina, also known as Anicée Schahmaneche (born Anicée Shahmanesh or Anicee Schahmane (Persian: انیسه شاهمنش; 28 January 1953 – 11 November 2006) was a French singer and actress.

== Early life and career ==
Alvina was born at Boulogne-Billancourt, Hauts-de-Seine. Her French mother and Iranian father owned a house on Rue de Verdun in Le Vésinet, where Alvina attended the Lycée Alain. After her 1969 graduation from the Conservatory in Saint-Germain-en-Laye Alvina made her screen debut in Elle boit pas, elle fume pas, elle drague pas, mais... elle cause ! (fr) in 1970.

Her second screen appearance was in the 1971 Lewis Gilbert film Friends, which would stay as her sole claim to international fame. The movie featured songs composed by Elton John and Bernie Taupin, and a subsequent best-selling OST album by the former. The film included a nude scene of the seventeen-year-old Alvina playing a fourteen-year-old character. She also starred in the 1974 sequel of Friends, entitled Paul and Michelle, although this followup movie was not as successful.

Alvina appeared regularly on the French screen, both cinema and television, throughout the 1970s chiefly in nymphet roles, working with such directors as Gérard Blain, Jacques Doniol-Valcroze, and Alain Robbe-Grillet, Alvina's highest career profile probably being afforded by the Robbe-Grillet films Glissements progressifs du plaisir (1974) and Le Jeu avec le feu (fr) (1975).

== Later career and death ==
Alvina starred in the TF1 mini-series Les 400 coups de Virginie (fr), which ran for six episodes from December 1979 to February 1980. Her only cinematic film credit for the 1980s was the 1981 film Rêve après rêve, a film directed and written by fashion designer Kenzo Takada, although Alvina did play the title role in the 1983 made-for-television film version of Diane Lanster (fr) directed by Bernard Queysanne (fr). Also in the early 1980s, Alvina attempted a singing career, with a solo single released in 1982. Then she joined the group Ici Paris, who had several singles released in 1980–83 and also a 1982 album, to replace Marie Alcaraz as lead singer and frontwoman. Around the time of her 1984 marriage, Alvina evidently retired from the entertainment world and did not re-emerge till 1995, when she resumed her acting career with the first of a series of occasional screen appearances.

Alvina died of lung cancer on 11 November 2006, at Boncourt, Eure-et-Loir, aged 53.

== Partial filmography ==
- Elle boit pas, elle fume pas, elle drague pas, mais... elle cause ! (fr) (She Does Not Drink, Smoke, or Flirt, But... She Talks!, 1970)
- Friends (1971)
- Le Rempart des béguines (1972)
- Les Grands sentiments font les bons gueuletons (Big Sentiments Make for Good Sports, 1973)
- Successive Slidings of Pleasure (1974)
- Paul and Michelle (1974)
- Isabelle and Lust (1975)
- Playing with Fire (1975)
- L'affiche rouge (1976)
- Une femme fatale (Femme Fatale, 1976)
- Le trouble-fesses (1976)
- L'arriviste (1976)
- Anima persa (1977)
- One, Two, Two : 122, rue de Provence (1978)
- El terrorista (1978)
- Second Wind (1978)
- La barricade du Point du Jour (1978)
- L'Honorable société (1978)
- Diane Lanster (1983, TV movie)
- Jusqu'au bout de la nuit (1995)
- Ainsi soit-il (2000)
- Charell (2008)

== Discography ==
- "Image À Définir"/ "Tu Fais Mal Et Ça Te Plait" (single) by Anicée Alvina (1982)
- "Maman Je N' Veux Plus Aller À L'École"/ "La Ver Interplanétaire" (1983) (single) by Ici Paris
