= Pierre and Djemila =

1987 film

- Film poster
- Directed by: Gérard Blain
- Written by: Gérard Blain; Mohamed Bouchibi; Michel Marmin
- Produced by: Philippe Diaz
- Starring: Jean-Pierre André; Nadja Reski
- Cinematography: Emmanuel Machuel
- Edited by: Catherine-Alice Deiller
- Release date: 27 May 1987
- Running time: 86 minutes
- Country: France
- Language: French

Pierre and Djemila (French: Pierre et Djemila) is a 1987 French drama film directed by Gérard Blain. The film addresses North African immigration in France through a tragic love story between two teenagers, a French boy and a girl of Algerian descent. It was entered into the 1987 Cannes Film Festival.

== Plot ==
In a working-class neighborhood in Northern France, Pierre, a teenager, meets Djemila, a girl from a family of Algerian immigrants. They start a relationship. Djemila's parents are well-meaning but traditional. Her father worries about his daughter growing up "like a Frenchwoman" and plans to send her back to Algeria and marry her off there to one of her cousins. Pierre's father, who fought in the Algerian War, doesn't hate Arabs but tries to convince his son to stop dating Djemila, arguing that the two cultures are simply too different.

Djemila's older brother, Djaffar, refuses to consider himself French and plans to be conscripted in Algeria; when his friends, also of Algerian descent, argue that France is their home and that they would not fit in there, he angrily dismisses them. Djemila refuses to leave for Algeria and marry a boy she has never met; Djaffar violently opposes his sister's relationship with a Frenchman. Meanwhile, tensions grow in the neighborhood about the growing Muslim population and the local mosque is sacked.

One night, Djaffar ambushes Pierre and Djemila; he fatally stabs Pierre. Djaffar is arrested after his father tells him to surrender to the police. Djemila commits suicide by jumping into a river.

== Cast ==
- Jean-Pierre André as Pierre Landry
- Nadja Reski as Djemila Khodja
- Abdelkader as Djaffar
- Salah Teskouk as Djemila's father
- Jacques Brunet as Pierre's father
- Fatiha Cheriguene as Djemila' mother
- Francine Debaisieux as Pierre's mother
- Djedjigua Ait-Hamouda as Aicha
- Fatia Cheeba as Houria
- Séverine Debaisieux as Carole
- Lakhdar Kasri as Lakhdar
- Svetlana Novak as Maths teacher
- Abdelkader Djerouni as Imam

== Production ==
Principal photography took place in Roubaix. As customary in his films as a director, Gérard Blain employed mostly non-professional actors.

== Reception ==
The film caused controversy at the time of its Cannes premiere, due to co-writer Michel Marmin's association with the French New Right. While ostensibly anti-racist and despite the other writer, Mohamed Bouchibi, being Algerian and a former FLN member, the film was accused of being anti-Arab and anti-miscenegation. It performed mediocrely at the French box office, selling 101 363 admissions.
