= The Pelican (film) =

1973 film

- Directed by: Gérard Blain
- Written by: Marie-Hélène Bauret; Gérard Blain; André Debaecque
- Starring: Gérard Blain
- Cinematography: Daniel Gaudry
- Release date: 1973
- Running time: 90 minutes
- Country: France
- Language: French

The Pelican (French: Le Pélican) is a 1973 French drama film directed by and starring Gérard Blain. It was entered into the 24th Berlin International Film Festival.

== Plot ==
As a jazz pianist, Paul Boyer (Gérard Blain) has lots of free time during the day. He spends those days with his son Marc, until he realizes that he is broke. Because of his nagging wife, Paul takes a chance on running counterfeit dollars to New York for a hefty profit. He gets caught, and spends nine years in New York prison. When he released, he returns to his home, only to find out that his wife is remarried to a wealthy man, and his rights as a father are revoked. Paul, who yearns to get his wife and son back, will do anything to be reunited with his family.

== Cast ==
- Gérard Blain as Paul
- Régis Blain as 2-year-old Marc
- César Chauveau as 10-year-old Marc
- Dominique Ravix as Isabelle
- Julie Ravix
- Daniel Sarky as Cazenave
- Stephen Angus as Boy riding Rollercoaster (uncredited)
