= A Child in the Crowd =

1976 French drama film

- DVD Cover
- French: Un Enfant dans la Foule
- Directed by: Gérard Blain
- Written by: Gérard Blain; Michel Pérez
- Produced by: Gérard Blain; Claude Berri
- Starring: César Chauveau; Claude Treille; Annie Kovaks; Jean Bertal
- Cinematography: Emmanuel Machuel
- Edited by: Marie-Aimée Debril
- Music by: Jean Schwarz
- Production companies: Télépresse Films; Cinépol; Renn Productions
- Distributed by: Société Nouvelle de Cinématographie (France); Noblesse Oblige Distribution (International)
- Release date: May 1976
- Running time: 85 minutes
- Country: France
- Language: French

A Child in the Crowd (French: Un enfant dans la foule) is a 1976 French drama film produced, written and directed by Gérard Blain. The movie stars César Chauveau, Claude Treille, Annie Kovaks and Jean Bertal.

The film has been characterized as an autobiographical study of Blain's own childhood; "unwanted and unloved by cold unfeeling parents." The depictions seen in the film are exactly what Blain actually did after being abandoned by his father as a kid, leaving school at age thirteen, and soon embarking on relationships with older men while harboring acting aspirations. The film premiered at the 1976 Cannes Film Festival.

== Plot ==
The film begins in 1937, with seven year old Paul being dropped off by his parents at a religious boarding school, in the middle of the night on the eve of World War II. Several years later, after his mother gets a divorce from his father, during the Nazi occupation of France, Paul, who is now thirteen years old, returns to live with his cold–hearted mother, who doesn't even like him.

Feeling abandoned and emotionally cut off from his mother and sister, he is constantly skipping school and wanders the streets of Paris, seeking out relationships with grown men, often playing an errand boy for the German soldiers, who reward him with cigarettes and small gifts. In one scene during the German occupation, Paul is seen comforting a naked woman, shaved bald, with a big swastika painted on her breasts, as she is marched through the streets and humiliated by the crowd during an anti-collaborationist purge.

Once the Liberation of France starts, he gets involved in the activities of the French Resistance. And then he gravitates to the friendly American soldiers who take him under their wing, offering both companionship and sexual encounters, with a steady supply of chocolate and cigarettes. After the war, Paul continues to befriend, and have sexual relations with men who are older than him, until he finally decides to make a career for himself as an actor.

The film ends with a stranger - director Gérard Blain in an uncredited cameo - asking for a light from a smoking Paul in the street, as he is about to embark on becoming an extra in Marcel Carné's Les Enfants du Paradis.

== Cast ==
- Jean François Cimino as young Paul
- César Chauveau as Paul
- Cécile Cousseau as young Micheline
- Claude Treille as Micheline
- Annie Kovaks as Paul's mother
- Jean Bertal as Paul's father
- Gabrielle Sassoum as Paul's grandmother
- Raymonde Badé-Mauffroy as the mistress
- Jacques Benoît-Lévy as the school director
- Claude Cernay as Gilles
- Jurgens Doeres as Laurent
- Bernard Soufflet as Jacques
- Gérard Blain as the stranger

== Reception ==
In his review of the film's premiere at Cannes, film critic Richard Roud wrote it is "one of the best films in the competition; with a semi-autobiographical tale of a fatherless boy growing up during the occupation, Blain has given us 'Truffaut revised and corrected by Bresson' ... neither sentimental nor scabrous." He further stated that "Blain and his cast of non-professionals delicately and austerely present an adolescent boy who finds in the company of older men a semblance of the affection that is lacking in his home life; but he soon learns these furtive sexual encounters are not the answer, that he must learn to make his way in life alone." American film critic Rex Reed called it "a sensitive, sincere work from an important director, and hoped Americans get an opportunity to see it."

Irish film director Ross McDonnell opined that "the film's uneasy quality challenges the idea that its meaning can be fixed tidily into sterile, sense making sentences; the film was a difficult proposition, commercially and critically; but Blain's version of his own experience ought not have to carry the burden of tidy explanation, to answer any of the questions it raises — on masculinity, on sexuality, on what exactly happened to this post–war generation of men without fathers."

Film critic James Travers said "the subdued lighting, grainy photography and muted colour palette lend the film a cold, documentary feel that is intensely evocative of France at the time of the occupation." He goes on to say that "Paul's cruel sense of isolation is accentuated by the almost robotic lack of feeling in the people he interacts with; throughout the film, the boy visibly pines for the warmth of human contact when there is patently none to be had; in doing so he makes himself a willing plaything for men who enjoy the company of prepubescent boys." He also opined that "there is a raw authenticity in César Chauveau's portrayal of the teenage Paul that cuts through you and leaves a lasting impression as you accompany him on his painful journey through adolescence."

Author Kate Ince wrote that "the vision of childhood conveyed in the film is very bleak, with a stone-hearted mother who incomprehensibly but deeply hates her son Paul, and a father who is indifferent to him and leaves the family; it's fascination with the difficult relationship between the father and son means that Blain's cinema evinces the inverse Oedipus complex." Jean-Baptiste Morain of Les Inrockuptibles observed that in the film "Blain recounts his troubled childhood without embellishment, with that Bressonian style and tone, both modest and raw, that make his cinema so immediately powerful. In Blain's work, the boys cry, wander around the city, and hang out with soldiers in search of the love they can't find at home."

Critic Christoph Huber wrote that "Paul's relationships with various men are equally tender and cruel, as the necessities of life and war keep intervening; for Blain, cruelty manifests itself less in the physical sense than in the quiet devastation resulting from when life cannot be lived like it ought, or, more precisely, how one would want it to be lived."

== See also ==
- Cinema of France
- List of French directors
- List of French-language films
- List of LGBTQ-related films of 1976
