= The Beguines =

1972 film by Guy Casaril

- Theatrical release poster
- French: Le Rempart des béguines
- Directed by: Guy Casaril
- Screenplay by: Guy Casaril; Françoise Mallet-Joris (Note: Dialogue)
- Based on: Le Rempart des béguines by Françoise Mallet-Joris
- Produced by: Robert Hakim; Raymond Hakim
- Starring: Nicole Courcel; Anicée Alvina; Venantino Venantini; Jean Martin; Ginette Leclerc; Harry-Max; Yvonne Clech; Élizabeth Teissier; Nadia Barentin
- Cinematography: Andreas Winding
- Edited by: Louisette Hautecoeur
- Music by: Michel Delpech; Roland Vincent
- Production companies: Paris Film Production; Antheo Cinematografica
- Distributed by: Consorzio Italiano Distributori Indipendenti Film
- Release date: 20 September 1972 (France)
- Running time: 90 minutes
- Countries: France; Italy
- Language: French

The Beguines (French: Le Rempart des béguines, lit. 'The Rampart of the Beguines') is a 1972 drama film directed by Guy Casaril and starring Nicole Courcel and Anicée Alvina. It is based on the 1951 novel Le Rempart des béguines by Belgian author Françoise Mallet-Joris. The plot centers around a stage that is reminiscent of Mallet-Joris's native hometown of Antwerp and addresses the themes of social class and korephilia. The film was released in France on 20 September 1972.

== Synopsis ==
Helena is a 15-year-old schoolgirl who lives with her wealthy father Rene and misses her dead mother. Helena is later seduced by her father's mistress Tamara, who takes advantage of the young girl's loneliness through manipulation and simultaneously enters an engagement with Rene.

== Cast ==
- Nicole Courcel as Tamara
- Anicée Alvina as Helene
- Venantino Venantini as Max
- Jean Martin as Rene
- Ginette Leclerc as Nina
- Harry-Max as the grandfather
- Yvonne Clech as Mme Perier
- Élizabeth Teissier (credited as Elisabeth Tessier) as Puck
- Nadia Barentin as Julia
- Axelle Abbadie as Madeleine
- Janine Mondon as himself
- Clément Michu as Howard
