= The Hunchback of Rome =

- Directed by: Carlo Lizzani
- Written by: Tommaso Chiaretti; Carlo Lizzani; Luciano Vincenzoni; Ugo Pirro
- Produced by: Dino De Laurentiis
- Starring: Gérard Blain
- Cinematography: Leonida Barboni; Aldo Tonti; Giuseppe Aquari
- Edited by: Franco Fraticelli
- Music by: Piero Piccioni
- Distributed by: Dino De Laurentiis Cinematografica
- Release date: 1960
- Running time: 103 minutes
- Country: Italy
- Language: Italian

The Hunchback of Rome (Italian: Il gobbo) is a 1960 Italian crime-drama film directed by Carlo Lizzani. It is loosely based on the real life events of Giuseppe Albano, an Italian partisan who was involved in the Roman Resistance against German occupation between 1943 and 1945.

== Plot ==
Alvaro Cosenza is a young immigrant partisan from the south, who, in German-occupied Rome, fights against fascist forces, becoming a partisan leader in the process. His main enemy is Inspector Moretti, who is also the father of Nina, a woman Alvaro realizes he's is in love with after assaulting and impregnating her as an insult to the inspector. Moretti is then killed by Alvaro when he, having discovered the violence suffered by his daughter, tries to have Alvaro killed by his own companions. Discovering that Alvaro had killed her father, Nina aborts the child.

After the liberation of Italy, together with members of his gang, Alvaro begins a life of crime, which causes the locals to label him as dangerous.

Left alone after her father's death, Nina becomes involved with Leandro, a former partisan, left maimed following a beating suffered by Moretti, who introduces her to prostitution. However, after meeting Alvaro again, she realizes that she is in love with him.

== Cast ==
- Gérard Blain: Alvaro Cosenza
- Anna Maria Ferrero: Nina
- Pier Paolo Pasolini: Leandro
- Bernard Blier: Maresciallo
- Nino Castelnuovo: Cencio
- Enzo Cerusico: Scheggia
- Ivo Garrani: Moretti
- Lars Bloch: German torturer
- Alex Nicol: U.S. official
- Franco Balducci: Pellaccia
- Guido Celano

== Background ==
The film is inspired by the true story of Giuseppe Albano, known as the "hunchback of the Quarticciolo" and is set against the backdrop of the Nazi occupation and the post-war period of the Roman villages, presented in a neorealist style by Carlo Lizzani.

Furthermore, the plot only partially tells the real story of Albano, drawing only a few (albeit relevant) ideas from it. Of note in this film is one of Pier Paolo Pasolini's first appearances on screen in the part of Leandro known as "er monco".

== Distribution ==
Broadcast on RAI for the first time in 1975, a few months before the killing of Pier Paolo Pasolini, with viewer discretion advised due to the crudeness of the subject and the dramatic sequence in which the actress Anna Maria Ferrero is seen from behind.
