= Mareike Carrière =

German actress (1954–2014)

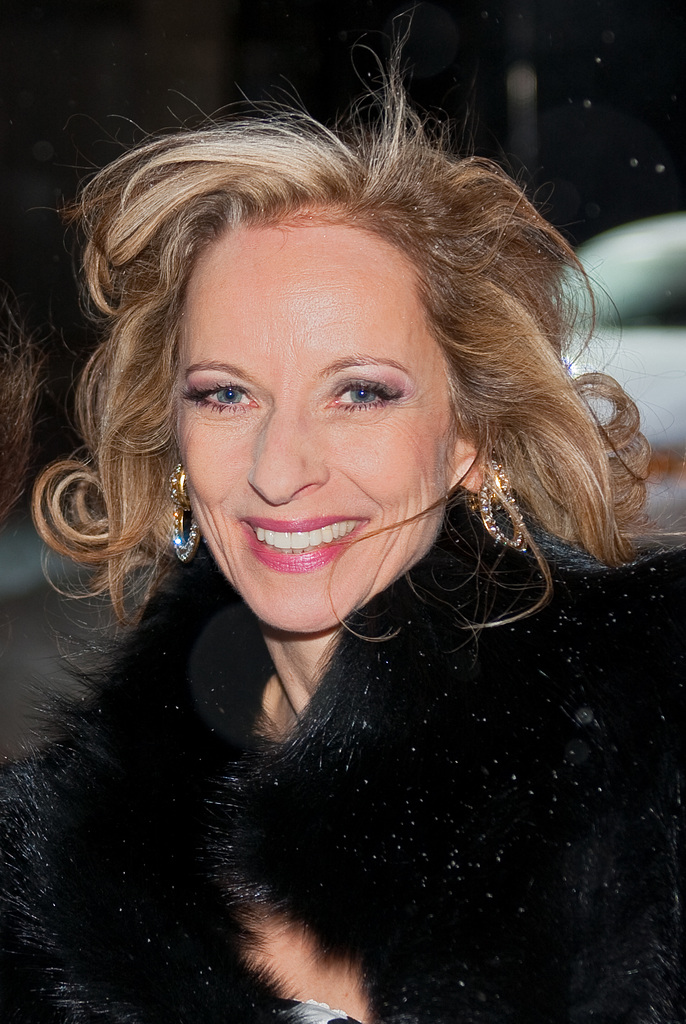
- Carrière at the 60th Berlin International Film Festival in 2010
- Born: Mareike Ann Carrière; 26 July 1954; Hanover, West Germany
- Died: 17 March 2014 (aged 59); Hamburg, Germany
- Occupation: Actress
- Years active: 1977–2014
- Relatives: Mathieu Carrière (brother)

Mareike Ann Carrière (26 July 1954 – 17 March 2014) was a German actress, spokesperson and translator. She was perhaps best known for her television show appearances. She was born in Hanover, Lower Saxony, West Germany.

At the age of 16, she began her training at the Lübeck Drama School. After completing this, she caught up on her Abitur and studied English and French at the Sorbonne in Paris. She finished this study with a diploma as a translator.

Carrière died from bladder cancer on 17 March 2014 in Hamburg, Germany. She was 59 years old.

== Filmography ==
- Good-for-Nothing (1978)
- Second Wind (1978)
- Der Fall Maurizius (1981, TV miniseries)
- The Confessions of Felix Krull (1982, TV miniseries)
- Yerma (1984)
- Abschied in Berlin (1985)
- Mary Ward (1985)
- Großstadtrevier (1986–1994, TV series)
- Praxis Bülowbogen (1987–1996, TV series)
- Lorentz & Söhne (1988, TV series)
- Fool's Mate (1989)
- The Dancing Girl (舞姫) (1989)
- The Rose Garden (1989)
- The Betrothed (1989, TV miniseries)
- L'avvocato delle donne (1997, TV miniseries)
- Die Schule am See (1997–2000, TV series)
- Was nicht passt, wird passend gemacht (2003–2007, TV series)
- The Call of the Toad (2005)
- Abendlied (2009)
- A Dangerous Method (2011)
