= WILD Foundation =

- The International Wilderness Leadership Foundation Inc.
- Founded: 1974; 52 years ago
- Type: Nonprofit
- Tax ID no.: 23-7389749
- Legal status: 501 (c)(3)
- Headquarters: Boulder, Colorado
- Product: Global Conservation Fund
- Board Chair: Joel Holtrop
- Chief Executive Officer: Amy Lewis
- Board of directors: Joel Holtrop; Clay Stranger; Ed Sanders; Charlotte Baron; Swati Hingorani; Lindsay Ellis; Jonathan Miller; Lena Georgas; Kat Haber; Keith Sproule; David Barron
- Website: https://wild.org/

The WILD Foundation is a 501(c)(3) organization that was founded in 1974 by two South Africans and based in Boulder, Colorado.

== History ==
The WILD Foundation was founded in 1974 by South African game ranger Ian Player and his Zulu mentor Magqubu Ntombela. One of their most notable conservation efforts prior to forming the WILD Foundation was called "Operation Rhino", the apartheid government's attempt to save the white rhinoceros from extinction in the 1960s. Recent escalations in poaching in the 2010s have brought rhinoceros preservation back to the forefront of WILD's efforts.

After leaving the government wildlife service, Player founded the Wilderness Leadership School, taking people on five-day hikes in the African wilderness. The school started during apartheid and was the first organization in Africa giving its participants a thorough wilderness experience regardless of race.

In 1974, the ideas of conservation that inspired the Wilderness Leadership School expanded into the concept that became the WILD Foundation and WILD's sister organizations in the Wilderness Network. Laurens van der Post worked closely with Player in the early days of WILD and was a founding member of the board of directors, serving until 1987. Originally named the International Wilderness Leadership Foundation, the organization began doing business as the WILD Foundation in 1988. WILD has been a member of the World Commission on Protected Areas (International Union for Conservation of Nature) since 1988, and founder/co-chair of the IUCN Wilderness Specialist Group.

Since its founding, the WILD Foundation has worked on scores of field projects in dozens of countries. In 1983, the WILD Foundation established the World Wilderness Congress. The WILD Foundation has helped foster organizations, such as the Cheetah Conservation Fund based in Namibia, National Geographic photographer James Balog's Extreme Ice Survey, and the International League of Conservation Photographers, a consortium of the world's top photographers dedicated to "furthering environmental and cultural conservation through ethical photography".

For six years until about 2010, WILD and iLCP partnered with the cement company Cemex to produce a book series about such topics as biodiversity, the human footprint, transboundary conservation and climate change. Starting in the 1990s CEMEX and local Mexican NGOs worked to realize CEMEX's conservation projects in the Maderas del Carmen region in northern Mexico. The Maderas del Carmen was the first legally designated wilderness area in Latin America. This work led to the establishment of an "Area of Bi-National Environmental Interest" straddling 10 million acres of Texas/Mexico border. This area was supported by presidents Barack Obama and Felipe Calderón and signed into law in November 2011.

== The World Wilderness Congress ==
The World Wilderness Congress is an environmental forum first convened in South Africa in 1977. The congress has become WILD's flagship program and has convened nine times on five continents, drawing thousands of people from around the world. World leaders, such as Mexico's President Felipe Calderón (2009), Norway's Prime Minister Gro Harlem Brundtland (1987), Australia's Prime Minister Malcolm Fraser (1980); notable people such as Jane Goodall and Sylvia Earle, Iain Douglas-Hamilton, Thor Heyerdahl, Wangari Maathai, Mario Molina; tribal and community leaders such as Tashka Yawanawa, Oren Lyons, Maqgubu Ntombela; the heads of major international corporations; and hundreds of conservationists have participated in the congress.

== Nature Needs Half ==
At the 9th World Wilderness Congress in Mérida, Mexico, WILD, with the collaboration of a spectrum of international organizations, governments and individuals, introduced Nature Needs Half, which aspires that humans give up use of half of land and water on Earth, in order to support wilderness. Marine biologist Sylvia Earle and Jane Goodall have endorsed Nature Needs Half, with Earle's only criticism being that she "hoped that half would be enough". Since its inception, WILD has begun collecting and conducting case studies of places around the world that have, or are on track to achieve, at least half protection.

== Wilderness Foundation Global ==
The WILD Foundation is a founding member of Wilderness Foundation Global, a consortium of independent, like-minded organizations consisting of WILD Foundation (US), The Wilderness Foundation (SA), The Wilderness Foundation (UK) and the Wilderness Leadership School (SA). Wilderness Foundation Global works worldwide to:

- Protect and sustain wilderness, wildlife, and human communities.
- Promote the values and services provide by wildlands and seas.
- Provide wilderness-related information, education, experience, and training.

== Publications ==
- International Journal of Wilderness ISSN 1086-5519
- Wilderness Management ISBN 1-55591-855-7
- Zulu Wilderness: Shadow and Soul, Ian Player ISBN 1-55591-363-6
- When Elephants Fly, Carol Batrus ISBN 978-1-55591-565-0
- Una Introducción al Derecho y las Políticas Internacionales Sobre Áreas Silvestres, Kormos
- International Handbook on Wilderness Law and Policy, Cyril Kormos, ISBN 978-1-55591-680-0
- Wilderness (published in Spanish as Tierras Silvestres) ,Vance Martin (images by Patricio Robles Gil) ISBN 978-607-00-1522-9.
