= L'avvocato delle donne =

- Genre: Legal drama
- Created by: Ugo Liberatore
- Starring: Mariangela Melato; Filippo Rodriguez; Rüdiger Joswig; Mareike Carrière
- Composer: Luis Bacalov
- Country of origin: Italy
- No. of seasons: 1
- No. of episodes: 6

Original release
- Network: Rai 2
- Release: March 11 – April 15, 1997

L'avvocato delle donne is an Italian legal drama television series.

== Cast ==
- Mariangela Melato: Irene Salvi
- Filippo Rodriguez: Lorenzo Salvi
- Rüdiger Joswig: Sandro Gruber
- Mareike Carriere: Giulia Castelli
- Carolina Salomè: Alice
- Lorenzo Gioielli: Fausto
- Paolo Maria Scalondro: P.M. Siena
- Leila Durante: Teresa
- Claudia Pozzi: Caterina
- Romina Mondello: Barbara Bruni
- Galatea Ranzi: Laura Nobili
- Fabrizia Sacchi: Cinzia
- Lorenza Indovina: Rosina Dazzi
