= Hatari! =

1962 American adventure romantic comedy film by Howard Hawks

- Theatrical release poster by Frank McCarthy
- Directed by: Howard Hawks
- Screenplay by: Leigh Brackett
- Story by: Harry Kurnitz
- Produced by: Howard Hawks
- Starring: John Wayne; Hardy Krüger; Elsa Martinelli; Gérard Blain; Red Buttons
- Cinematography: Russell Harlan
- Edited by: Stuart Gilmore
- Music by: Henry Mancini
- Color process: Technicolor
- Distributed by: Paramount Pictures
- Release date: June 19, 1962
- Running time: 157 minutes
- Country: United States
- Language: English
- Box office: $12,923,077

Hatari! (pronounced [hɑtɑri], Swahili for "Danger!") is a 1962 American adventure romantic comedy film starring John Wayne as the leader of a group of professional game catchers in Africa. Directed by Howard Hawks, it was shot in Technicolor and filmed on location in northern Tanganyika (in what is now Tanzania). The film includes dramatic wildlife chases and the scenic backdrop of Mount Meru, a dormant volcano.

At the 35th Academy Awards, Russell Harlan was nominated for Best Color Cinematography for his work on Hatari!, but the award went to Freddie Young for his work on Lawrence of Arabia.

== Plot ==
In Tanganyika, the Momella Game Company captures animals for zoos and circuses using off-road vehicles, lassos, and cages. The crew consists of French owner Brandy de la Court; Irish-American Sean Mercer, who heads the capture expeditions; retired German race car driver Kurt Müller; Mexican bullfighter Luis Francisco García López; Native American sharpshooter Little Wolf (a.k.a. "the Indian"); zoophobic former New York City cab driver "Pockets"; and several native Tanganyikans. During the captures, Kurt and the Indian drive a herding jeep to force animals toward a larger capture truck driven by Pockets.

An aggressive rhinoceros gores the Indian's leg during a pursuit, and the crew transports him to the Arusha hospital. French marksman Charles "Chips" Maurey approaches them, wanting the Indian's job. Kurt, offended, punches him. Realizing he is the only one present with the Indian's rare blood type, Chips agrees to undergo a transfusion to save the Indian, and Sean offers Chips a job.

Returning to their compound, the crew finds Italian photographer Anna Maria "Dallas" D'Alessandro has arrived. Everyone was expecting a male photographer, but as Dallas was sent by Momella's biggest client (the Basel zoo), Sean reluctantly allows her to accompany the crew on a giraffe capture. Despite many rookie mishaps, Dallas enjoys herself, and everyone except Sean votes to let her stay.

The next day, Chips arrives and has a sharpshooting contest with Kurt before returning him the favor with a punch; afterward, the two become friends. Dallas and Sean gradually become mutually attracted, though Sean resists, as his first fiancée abandoned him. Meanwhile, Kurt and Chips pursue Brandy, and Pockets reveals to Dallas he secretly has feelings for Brandy, too. The Indian is released from the hospital, but is shaken by his experience and tries to talk Sean out of catching any more rhinos. Sean refuses, but agrees to at least wait until the end of the season after filling all the other orders.

The crew visits a village, where a rogue female elephant has just been killed by a game warden. Dallas immediately adopts the elephant's orphaned calf, despite Sean's protests. Chaos ensues when the crew obtains goats to get milk for the calf. Later that night, Dallas apologizes to Sean and coerces him into a kiss.

A second orphaned elephant calf suddenly shows up at the compound. A local group of Waarusha people, impressed by how the elephants follow Dallas, adopt her into their tribe and name her "Mama Tembo" ("Mother of Elephants"). A few days later, a third elephant orphan mysteriously appears, infuriating Sean.

The crew captures a zebra, an oryx, a gazelle, a leopard, and a buffalo. During a wildebeest pursuit, the herding car blows a tire and flips over. Kurt's shoulder is dislocated and Chips' leg is badly sprained in the crash. Later the same day, Pockets falls off a tall fence and is unhurt, but Brandy shows the most concern for him out of the three, indicating whom she loves.

Pockets successfully launches a small rocket attached to a net to trap nearly 500 vervet monkeys in a tree, surprising everyone, including himself. A rhino is the only order left to fill, so the crew sets out and finds an angry bull rhino. Although he escapes their first attempt, they resume the pursuit and manage to safely capture him.

The hunting season ends. Dallas, fearing that Sean cannot move beyond his past fiancée's betrayal, writes a farewell letter and flees the compound. Helped by the crew and the three baby elephants, Sean tracks her to Arusha, where they reconcile. Sean and Dallas are married and prepare to spend their wedding night in Sean's room, until the baby elephants barge in and destroy the bed.

== Cast ==
- John Wayne as Sean Mercer
- Hardy Krüger as Kurt Müller
- Elsa Martinelli as Anna Maria "Dallas" D'Alessandro
- Red Buttons as "Pockets"
- Gérard Blain as Charles "Chips" Maurey
- Bruce Cabot as Little Wolf ("the Indian")
- Michèle Girardon as Brandy de la Court
- Valentin de Vargas as Luis Francisco García López
- Eduard Franz as Dr. Sanderson
- Cathy Lewis as the voice of "Arusha Control" on the radio (uncredited)
- Queenie Leonard as Nurse (uncredited, scenes deleted)

== Production ==
While Hatari! is bookended by the two attempts to capture a rhinoceros, it otherwise has a very loose script, and like many other works by Howard Hawks, is principally structured around the relationships among the characters. At the start of production, all Hawks knew was that he wanted to make a movie about people who catch animals in Africa for zoos, which he saw as a dangerous profession that would allow for exciting scenes, the likes of which had never been seen on-screen before. Much of the script was written by Hawks' favorite writer, Leigh Brackett, after the production returned from Africa with footage of the characters catching various animals, and before and during studio takes in Hollywood.

Hawks increased his knowledge of animal-catching by studying the work of famous South African animal conservationist Dr. Ian Player. In 1952, South Africa was eliminating large wild animals to protect livestock, and only 300 white rhinos survived. Player then invented his famed rhino-catching technique to relocate and save the white rhinos. His project was called Operation Rhino, and it was recorded in the renowned documentary film of the same name.

Another source of inspiration for Hawks was famous animal photographer Ylla, so he had Brackett add the character of Dallas to the script. Hawks said, "We took that part of the story from a real character, a German girl. She was the best animal photographer in the world."

Hawks stated in interviews that he had originally planned to star both Clark Gable, who had just played a rough-and-ready wild horse catcher (who did his own stunts) in The Misfits, and Wayne in the film, until Gable's death in November, 1960.

Much of the film revolves around scenes of the cast chasing animals in jeeps and trucks across the plains of East Africa. Ngorongoro farm, purchased by Hardy Kruger after the filming, served as the movie's setting. The animals pursued are all live, wild, and untrained. Capturing animals by chasing them down is banned today both due to concerns over strain upon all those involved in a chase (targeted and not) and the development of effective animal tranquilizers and powerful dart guns to subdue those ultimately selected.

According to director Howard Hawks, all of the animal captures in the film were performed by the actors themselves, not by stuntmen or animal handlers (although a stand-in, Mildred Lucy "Rusty" Walkley, was used for some scenes involving Elsa Martinelli's character). When Hawks interviewed de Vargas, he said production would be very dangerous, as there would be no double, and showed de Vargas a documentary. Government-licensed animal catcher Willy de Beer was hired by Hawks as a technical adviser, and his assistants and he worked with the actors on how to go about catching the animals. During filming, the rhino really did escape, and the actors had to recapture it, which Hawks included in the completed film for its realism.

Much of the audio in the capture sequences had to be redubbed due to John Wayne's cursing while wrestling with the animals, and Hawks said Wayne admitted being scared during some of the action scenes, particularly those in which he is sitting in the exposed "catching seat" as a truck hurtles over terrain full of hidden holes and obstacles. According to Hawks, Wayne "had the feeling with every swerve that the car was going to overturn as he hung on for dear life, out in the open with only a seat belt for support, motor roaring, body jarring every which-way, animals kicking dirt and rocks, and the thunder of hundreds of hooves increasing the din in his ears." One evening, though, while Buttons and Wayne were playing cards outside, a leopard came out of the bush towards them, but when Buttons mentioned the approaching leopard, Wayne reportedly simply said, "See what he wants."

Filming in Africa was dangerous not just for the actors. De Vargas said de Beer was mauled by a loose baby leopard that sprang on him from a tree, and "came back with his arm covered in bandages and throat completely wrapped, but he just shrugged it off."

As the animals frequently refused to make noise "on cue" (in particular, the baby elephants refused to trumpet inside populated areas), local Arusha game experts and zoo collectors were hired to do "animal voice impersonations" for the film.

Michèle Girardon spoke no English when she was cast, and according to a July 1961 Life magazine profile of the actress, she taught herself English while on the set.

John Wayne wore a belt with the famed "Red River D" from his starring role in Hawks' iconic Red River on its buckle, as he did in many of his movies. It can be clearly seen in the scene where Sean Mercer radios "Arusha Control" after the Indian is gored by the rhino at the start of the film, and again in the scene where Sonja (the cheetah) wanders into the bathroom while Dallas is bathing and introduces herself by licking Dallas and purring.

The memorable Henry Mancini tune "Baby Elephant Walk" was written for and first appeared in Hatari!. Another memorable musical moment from the film is a duet of Stephen Foster's "Old Folks at Home" (a.k.a. "Swanee River"), with Dallas on piano and Pockets on harmonica.

== Reception ==
Hatari! grossed $12,923,077 at the box office, $7 million of which came from U.S. theatrical rentals. It was the seventh-highest-grossing film of 1962.

On review aggregator Rotten Tomatoes, 65% of 26 critics gave the film a positive review, with an average rating of 6.7/10, earning it a "Fresh" score.

Jean-Luc Godard listed Hatari! as one of the best films of its year of release.

The film was nominated by American Film Institute in its 2005 AFI's 100 Years of Film Scores.

== Novelization ==
Michael Milner adapted Leigh Brackett's screenplay for the film into a paperback novel published by Pocket Books in 1962 as a tie-in to the movie. The novel goes into more detail about some aspects of the animal-catching, particularly Pockets' rocket-net project, as well as the pursuit of Brandy by Kurt, Chips, and Pockets.

== Comic book adaptation ==
- Dell Movie Classic: Hatari! (January 1963)

== See also ==
- Hatari! Music from the Paramount Motion Picture Score, soundtrack album by Henry Mancini
- List of American films of 1962
- John Wayne filmography
