= Jusqu'au bout de la nuit =

- Directed by: Gérard Blain
- Written by: Gérard Blain; Marie-Hélène Bauret
- Produced by: Frédéric Marboeuf
- Starring: Gérard Blain; Anicée Alvina
- Cinematography: Daniel Gaudry
- Edited by: Catherine Taieb
- Music by: Tarik Benouarka
- Production company: DB Films
- Distributed by: Pathé Distribution
- Release date: 13 September 1995
- Running time: 80 minutes
- Country: France
- Language: French

Jusqu'au bout de la nuit ("until the end of the night") is a 1995 French drama film directed by Gérard Blain, starring Blain and Anicée Alvina. It tells the story of a man in his sixties who is released after a long prison sentence, and tries to have a relationship with a younger woman, while still determined to live outside the law. Blain described the film as "not a gangster film, but a love film and a relentless tragedy". Sylvia Jeanjacquot, the widow of the criminal Jacques Mesrine, appears in a minor role.

The film was shot in December 1994 in Lyon, Villeurbane, Vénissieux and Sathonay. It was shown at the Montreal World Film Festival and Cairo International Film Festival in 1995. It was released on France on 13 September 1995.

== Cast ==
- Gérard Blain as François
- Anicée Alvina as Maria
- Gamil Ratib as Rousseau
- Paul Blain as Christian
- Frédéric Marboeuf as Serge
- Pierre Blain as Benoît
- Sylvia Jeanjacquot as the lawyer

== Reception ==
Arte's Olivier Père wrote in 2012 that while the main character is a rebel of a type already seen in Blain's previous films, the director here deviates from genre conventions more heavily than before. Père wrote: "More surprising is the radicality of the directing which exposes the extremist discourse of the film. In great rigour, it evokes the cinematography of Robert Bresson, admittedly referenced by Blain throughout his whole filmography." Père continued: "With its rigorous aesthetics and moral, Jusqu’au bout de la nuit distinguishes itself from all and sundry of the French cinematic output of its time. But it is also a (politically) incorrect and disturbing film, charged with a restrained and subversive violence."
