= Michel Marmin =

French journalist and art critic

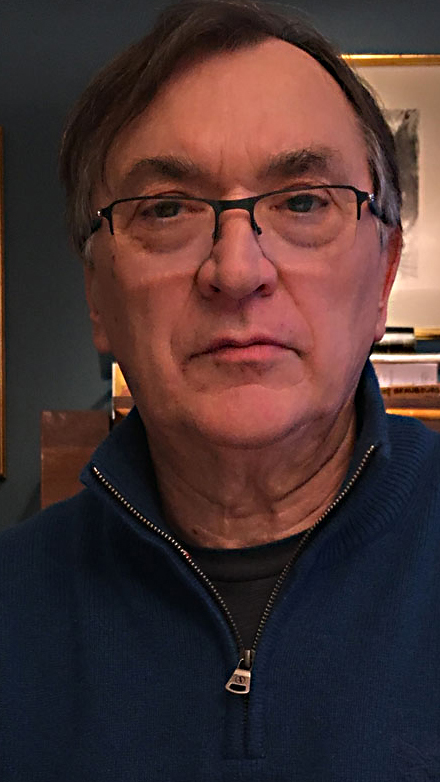
- Michel Marmin
- Born: 18 November 1943 (age 82)
- Occupations: Journalist, art critic

Michel Marmin (born 18 November 1943) is a French journalist and film critic.

== Biography ==
Born 18 November 1943, Michel Marmin was a member of the non-religious scouting association Éclaireurs de France in the 1950s. He attended the Institut des hautes études cinématographiques.

Marmin is aligned with the neopagan faction of the French New Right. In 1971, he was recruited by media entrepreneur Raymond Bourgine and began to work as a cinema critic for Valeurs Actuelles (1972–1978). Upon the public launch of GRECE's magazine Éléments in September 1973, Marmin became its first president, followed by Pierre Vial in 1983. He also served as the deputy secretary general of GRECE, in charge of press relations.

In September 1976, he co-founded the publishing house Copernic. Marmin then worked for Le Figaro between 1978 and 1980, and as the redactor-in-chief of the encyclopedia branch of Éditions Atlas. Between 1991 and 1992, he served as the president of GRECE.

He co-wrote two films directed by Gérard Blain, Pierre and Djemila (1987) and Ainsi soit-il (2000), which led to controversies in the media due to his far-right involvement.

In 2012–2013, Marmin was among the sponsors of TV Libertés, a far-right web TV.
