= Second Wind (1978 film) =

- Theatrical release poster
- Directed by: Gérard Blain
- Written by: Gérard Blain; Michel Pérez
- Produced by: Louis Duchesne
- Starring: Robert Stack; Anicée Alvina
- Cinematography: Emmanuel Machuel
- Edited by: Jean-Philippe Berger
- Music by: Jean-Pierre Stora
- Distributed by: Gaumont Distribution
- Release date: 13 September 1978
- Running time: 95 minutes
- Country: France
- Language: French

Second Wind (French: Un second souffle) is a 1978 French drama film directed by Gérard Blain, starring Robert Stack and Anicée Alvina. It tells the story of a man in his 50s who leaves his wife and children to live with a woman 30 years younger than himself, only to discover an unsettling link between the woman and a man of his age who had been in a motorcycle accident.

== Cast ==
- Robert Stack as François Davis
- Anicée Alvina as Catherine
- Sophie Desmarets as Louise Davis
- Mareike Carrière as Sophie
- Frédéric Meisner as Marc
- César Chauveau as Catherine's brother
