= Ian Player =

South African wildlife conservationist (1927– 2014)

Ian Cedric Player, DMS
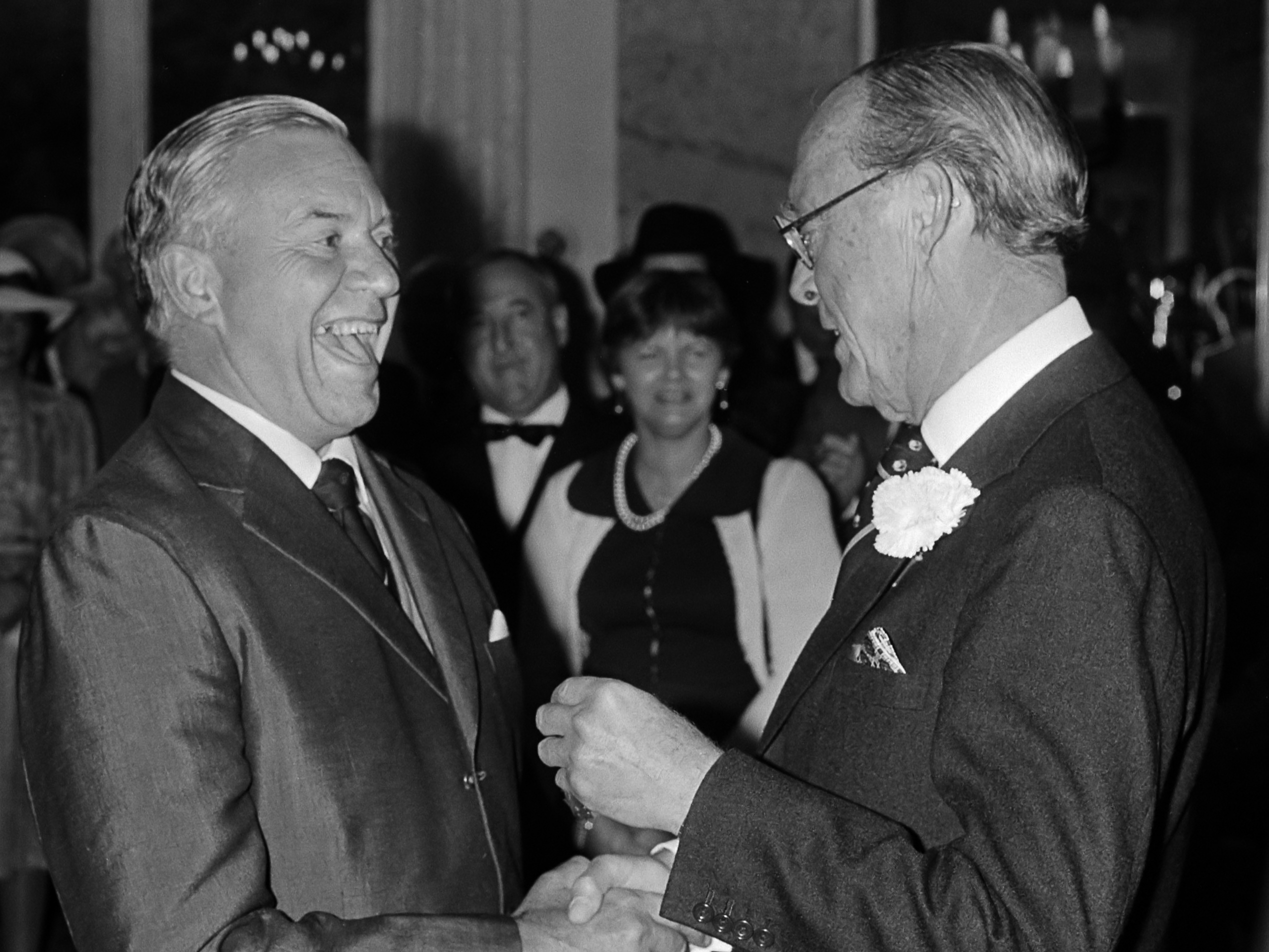
- Player and Prince Bernhard of Lippe-Biesterfeld (1981)
- Born: 15 March 1927; Johannesburg, Transvaal Union of South Africa
- Died: 30 November 2014 (aged 87); KwaZulu-Natal, South Africa
- Occupation: Nature conservationist
- Employer: Natal Parks Board
- Spouse: Ann Player
- Relatives: Gary Player (brother) Wilma Jacobs (nee player )
- Website: www.ianplayer.com

Ian Cedric Audley Player DMS (15 March 1927 – 30 November 2014) was a South African international conservationist. Ian Player was one of the world's outstanding conservationists and environmental statesmen. He earned his stripes in the rough and tumble era during which Africa's protected areas were being created and tested. With his team, he also pioneered the saving of endangered species when they saved the white rhino from extinction (Operation Rhino).

== Biography ==
Born in Johannesburg, Player spent his first years in a modest timber and corrugated iron home at the Robinson Deep gold mine. Player’s father Francis Player was a shift boss at the mine; he married Muriel in 1922. Player’s sister Wilma was born in 1934 and Gary Player was born a year later in 1935.

Player was educated at St. John's College, Johannesburg, Union of South Africa. At school he excelled at sports, but a serious knee injury prevented him from pursuing them. He instilled a love of sport and physical discipline in his brother Gary.

Player served in the 6th Armoured Division attached to the American 5th Army in Italy 1944–46.

Immediately after the war Player worked in the gold-mines.

Player's conservation career can said to have begun in 1952 when he became a game ranger in the Umfolozi Game Reserve, in northern Zululand, in the service of the Natal Parks Board.

Player married Ann Farrer in 1957. They had three children: Kenneth, Jessica and Amyas.

Player died on 30 November 2014 of a stroke.

== Conservation ==
Player's conservation career started with the Natal Parks Board in 1952 and whilst Warden of the Umfolozi Game Reserve, he spearheaded two key initiatives:

- Operation Rhino - that saved the few remaining southern race of white rhino.
- Protected status for the Umfolozi and St. Lucia Wilderness Areas (now known as the iSimangaliso Wetland Park World Heritage Site)- The first wilderness areas to be zoned in South Africa and on the African continent.

Player was the Founder of the Wilderness Leadership School, which still runs the original wilderness trails to this day.

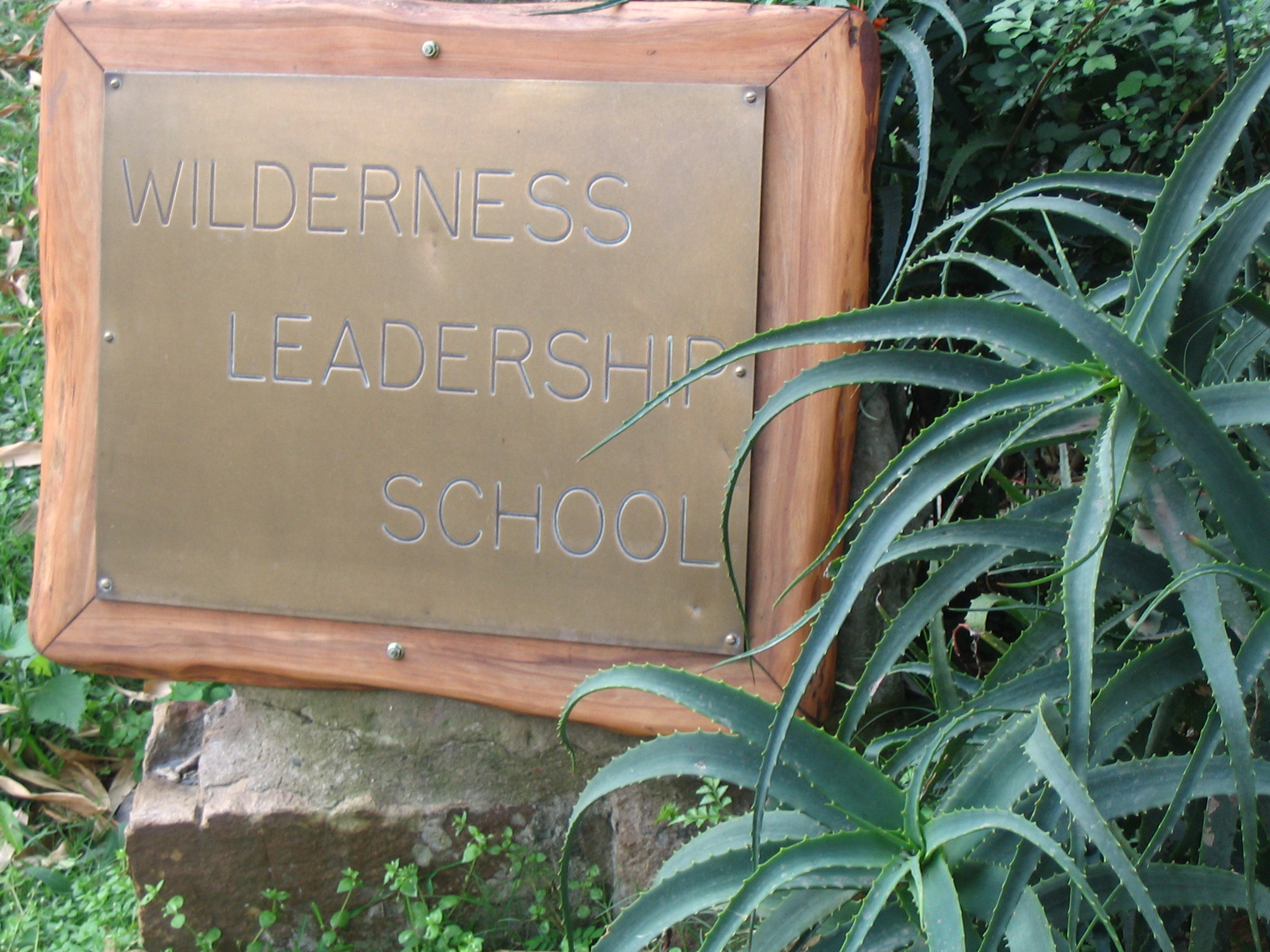
Wilderness Leadership School plaque

This led to the formation of the Wild Foundation, the Wilderness Foundation SA, Wilderness Foundation UK, Magqubu Ntombela Foundation not to mention the World Wilderness Congresses, first convened in 1977.

In 2004 Player collaborated with Sarah Collins, entrepreneur, visionary, and women's rights activist, to create 'Take Back The Future'. The objective was to tempt mainstream South African youth into this arena of wilderness preservation. 'Take Back The Future' raised money through selling earth worms, and growing and selling vegetables at farmer's markets. By setting up youth groups they were able to innovate and upscale the concept across communities in South Africa.

Amongst many orders and awards, Player was awarded the Knight of the Order of the Golden Ark and the Decoration for Meritorious Service (the then highest Republic of South African civilian award). He was the recipient of two honorary doctorates:

- Doctor of Philosophy, Honoris Causa from the University of Natal.
- Doctor of Laws (LLD) (h.c.) from Rhodes University.

Player's archives and legacy are owned and managed by his nephew Marc Player, who has initiated several projects including books (Into the River of Life) a feature-length movie, a TV series built around Operation Rhino translocation program and THE PLAYER INDABA which seeks global "PLAYERS' to raise funds to fight the extinction of various threatened animal species. The Ian Player Foundation has also been established as a charitable organization aiding nature conservation, wildlife activism and environmental education.

== In popular culture ==
The famous movie director and producer Howard Hawks, wanted a movie about people who catch animals in Africa for zoos, a dangerous profession with exciting scenes the likes of which had never been seen on-screen before. The name of his blockbuster movie is Hatari!, starring John Wayne. Hawks increased his knowledge in catching animals from Player's humane work. In 1952 South Africa was disastrously embarked to eliminate all large wild animals to protect livestock, and only 300 white rhinos survived. Player then started his famed rhino catching technique to relocate and save the white rhinos. Player's humane project was called Operation Rhino and the renowned film documentary named Operation Rhino was produced. Hawks studied this film documentary repeatedly to help incorporate aspects of it into his film Hatari!.

In June 1964, Player appeared on the panel show To Tell the Truth as himself, highlighting his role as warden of Hluhluwe–Imfolozi Park and his work protecting white rhinos. Host Bud Collyer noted that scenes of white rhinos shown at the beginning of the episode were from Ivan Tors' movie Rhino!, released a few weeks earlier, and for which Player acted as a technical advisor.

== Selected works ==
- Men, Rivers and Canoes – 1964 - Reissued 2007 - ISBN 978-0-9802501-2-1
- White Rhino Saga – 1972 - ISBN 978-0-00-211938-2
- Big Game – 1972 - ASIN: B0007BO5E4
- Man and the Wilderness – 1986 - ASIN: B0007BQ0FG
- Zululand Wilderness: Shadow and Soul – 1997 - ISBN 978-0-86486-340-9 - archive
- Ian Player Perspective, stories by and about Dr. Ian Player

== Awards ==
Dr. Player receives the 2012 Anton Rupert Award for Lifetime Achievement in Conservation
