= La Musica (film) =

La Musica is a 1967 French drama film directed by Marguerite Duras and Paul Séban after Duras' play of the same name (fr) first performed 8 October 1965 at the Studio des Champs-Elysées.

== Cast ==
- Delphine Seyrig : Elle
- Robert Hossein : Lui
- Julie Dassin : La jeune fille
- Gérard Blain
