= Philippe Vallois =

Philippe Vallois (born 27 August 1948 in Bordeaux, France) is an openly gay screenwriter and director whose film Johan (1976) was selected for the Cannes Film Festival.

== Filmography ==
| Year | French title (original title) | English title | Notes |
|---|---|---|---|
| 1975 | Les phalènes | | |
| 1976 | Johan | Johan | also known as Johan – Mon été 75, Johan, carnet intime homosexuel, and Journal intime homosexuel d'un été 75 |
| 1977 | Lamento | | aka Baisers |
| 1979 | Nous étions un seul homme | We Were One Man | |
| 1983 | Haltéroflic | Rainbow Serpent | |
| 1984 | Huguette Spengler, ma patrie, la nébuleuse du rêve | | |
| 1988 | L'énigme des sables | | made for TV |
| 1999 | Le caméscope | | |
| 2003 | Un parfum nommé Saïd | | |
| 2006 | Johan – Secrets du tournage | | |
| 2007 | Sexus Dei | | |
| 2008 | Esprit es-tu là? | | |
| 2008 | La valse des musclés | | |
| 2012 | Le voyage de l'hippocampe | | |
