= Gérard Blain =

French actor (1930–2000)

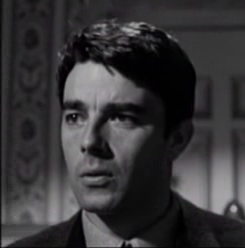
- Blain in Silver Spoon Set (1960)
- Born: 23 October 1930; Paris, France
- Died: 17 December 2000 (aged 70); Paris, France
- Occupations: Actor, film director
- Years active: 1944–2000
- Spouses: Estella Blain (1953–1956) (divorced); Bernadette Lafont (1957–1959) (divorced); Monique Sobieski (1960–2000) (his death)

Gérard Blain (23 October 1930 – 17 December 2000) was a French actor and film director. He is perhaps best known for his roles in Claude Chabrol's Le Beau Serge and Les Cousins (both 1959), Howard Hawks' Hatari! (1962) and Wim Wenders' The American Friend. (1977) He began directing in the 1970s, becoming known for his ascetic style. His first film as a director, The Friends (1971) won the Golden Leopard at the Locarno Film Festival.

== Biography ==
Blain had a difficult childhood and adolescence after his father abandoned his family. He left school at aged 13 and became a street urchin. He had his first sexual experiences with older men and women while still a young teenager, a period later echoed in his semi-autobiographical film A Child in the Crowd (Un enfant dans la foule, 1976). Wishing to become an actor, Blain starting working as a film extra in 1943.

Blain had his breakthrough role in the crime drama Deadlier Than the Male (Voici le temps des assassins, 1956), opposite Jean Gabin: French media hailed him at the time as "the French James Dean". He starred in François Truffaut's short film Les Mistons (1957), Claude Chabrol's first two feature films Le Beau Serge (1958) and Les Cousins (1959), and appeared in Jean-Luc Godard's short film Charlotte and Her Boyfriend (1960). This led him to be associated to the French New Wave, though he later disparaged the movement, calling it "fake, except for Godard".

The French-Italian co-production system of the time also led him to star in Italian films, including Mauro Bolognini's Young Husbands (1958) and Carlo Lizzani's The Hunchback of Rome (1960) and Gold of Rome (1961). In 1962, he essayed a Hollywood career with a supporting role in Howard Hawks' Hatari! opposite John Wayne, but found himself ill-suited to American filmmaking. Later on, unhappy with his acting career, he became a film director, making nine films between 1971 and 2000.

His first film as a director, The Friends, a drama about male homosexuality, won the Golden Leopard at the 1971 Locarno International Film Festival.

Blain's directing choices were rigorous and deliberately austere, closely emulating Robert Bresson's style: he mostly employed non-professional actors, one major exception being his film Second Wind (1978) which starred Robert Stack. An outspoken critic of mainstream filmmaking and modern society in general, and reportedly a difficult man to work with, Blain had an outsider status within the French film industry; although they were well-received by critics, his films as a director met with little commercial success. While focusing on his directing work he kept appearing occasionally as an actor, notably in Wim Wenders' The American Friend (1977).

In 1987, Blain's career was affected when his film Pierre and Djemila, an ostensibly anti-racist tragic love story, was accused of being racist due to co-writer Michel Marmin being a member of the French New Right.

== Personal life ==
Blain married three times; his first two wives were actresses Estella Blain and Bernadette Lafont. One of his sons, Paul Blain, also had an acting career and starred in his final film as a director, Ainsi soit-il (1999).

== Filmography ==
=== Actor ===
Year	Title	Role	Director	Notes
1944	Le bal des passants		Guillaume Radot	
1944	Le carrefour des enfants perdus		Léo Joannon	
1945	Les enfants du paradis		Marcel Carné	Uncredited
1946	Fils de France		Pierre Blondy	
1954	Wild Fruit		Hervé Bromberger	
1954	Before the Deluge	High school boy	André Cayatte	Uncredited
1954	Service Entrance	The photographer	Carlo Rim	Uncredited
1956	Voici le temps des assassins	Gérard Delacroix	Julien Duvivier	
1956	Crime and Punishment	Jean Fargeot	Georges Lampin	
1957	Le désir mène les hommes	Olivier Jourdans	Émile Roussel	
1957	Les Mistons	Gérard	François Truffaut	Short
1958	Young Husbands	Marcello	Mauro Bolognini	
1958	Le Beau Serge	Serge	Claude Chabrol	
1959	Les Cousins	Charles	Claude Chabrol	
1959	Match contre la mort	Jacques Lourmel	Claude Bernard-Aubert	
1960	Silver Spoon Set	Anselmo Foresi	Francesco Maselli	
1960	Run with the Devil	Stefano Solera	Mario Camerini	
1960	Charlotte and Her Boyfriend	Charlotte's new boyfriend	Jean-Luc Godard	Short
1960	The Hunchback of Rome	Alvaro aka "Hunchback"	Carlo Lizzani	
1961	La peau et les os	Mazur	Jean-Paul Sassy	
1961	Gold of Rome	Davide	Carlo Lizzani	
1962	Hatari!	Charles "Chips" Maurey	Howard Hawks	
1962	Lo sgarro	Paolo	Silvio Siano	
1963	The Eye of the Needle	Toto Cacace	Marcello Andrei	
1963	Les Vierges	Xavier de Brétevielle	Jean-Pierre Mocky	
1963	La soupe aux poulets	Claudio	Philippe Agostini	
1964	La Bonne Soupe	The painter	Robert Thomas	
1964	Via Veneto		Giuseppe Lipartiti	
1964	Amori pericolosi	Soldier	Giulio Questi	(segment "Il generale")
1965	Un amore	Marcello	Gianni Vernuccio	
1966	M.M.M. 83	Robert Gibson	Sergio Bergonzelli	
1967	La Musica		Marguerite Duras and Paul Seban	
1967	Shock Troops	Thomas	Constantin Costa-Gavras	
1968	Negresco	Roger	Klaus Lemke	
1969	Joë Caligula - Du suif chez les dabes	Joë Caligula	José Bénazéraf	
1970	Caïn de nulle part	Caïn	Daniel Daërt	
1971	Paolo e Francesca	Giovanni Malatrasi	Gianni Vernuccio	
1974	The Pelican	Paul Boyer	Himself	
1976	A Child in the Crowd	Man in the street	Himself	Uncredited cameo
1977	The American Friend	Raoul Minot	Wim Wenders	
1977	The Machine	Journalist	Paul Vecchiali	
1978	Utopia	Gérard	Iradj Azimi	
1981	La Flambeuse	Henri	Rachel Weinberg	
1983	Un dimanche de flic	Emilio	Michel Vianey	
1983	La derelitta	Redza	Jean-Pierre Igoux	
1986	La Presqu'île	Simon	Georges Luneau	
1987	Killing Time	Broz	Edouard Niermans	
1988	Natalia	Claude Roitman	Bernard Cohn	
1989	Jour après jour	Richard Lunet	Alain Attal	
1989	L'enfant de l'hiver	Stephane's father	Olivier Assayas	
1992	Chasse gardée	Pierre Bufières	Jean-Claude Biette	
1995	Jusqu'au bout de la nuit	François	Himself	
1999	Cinématon	Himself	Gérard Courant	
2001	Bandits d'amour	The priest	Pierre Le Bret	Final film role

=== Director ===
Year	Title	Notes
1971	The Friends	Also writer
1974	The Pelican	Also writer and lead actor
1976	A Child in the Crowd	Also writer
1978	Second Wind	Also writer
1980	The Rebel	Also writer
1987	Pierre and Djemila	Also writer
1993	La Fortune de Gaspard	TV movie; also writer
1995	Jusqu'au bout de la nuit	Also writer and lead actor
2000	Ainsi soit-il	Also writer
