= List of American films of 1967 =

More than 200 American films were released in 1967.

In the Heat of the Night won the Academy Award for Best Picture.

== A-D ==
Title	Director	Cast	Genre	Notes
40 Guns to Apache Pass	William Witney	Audie Murphy, Kenneth Tobey, Laraine Stephens	Western	Columbia
The Adventures of Bullwhip Griffin	James Neilson	Roddy McDowall, Suzanne Pleshette, Karl Malden	Western comedy	Disney
The Ambushers	Henry Levin	Dean Martin, Senta Berger, Janice Rule	Spy comedy	Columbia; sequel
The Ballad of Josie	Andrew V. McLaglen	Doris Day, Peter Graves, George Kennedy	Western comedy	Universal
Banning	Ron Winston	Robert Wagner, Anjanette Comer, Jill St. John	Drama	Universal
Barefoot in the Park	Gene Saks	Robert Redford, Jane Fonda, Mildred Natwick, Charles Boyer	Comedy	Paramount. Based on the play
Beach Red	Cornel Wilde	Cornel Wilde, Rip Torn, Jaime Sánchez	War	United Artists
The Big Mouth	Jerry Lewis	Jerry Lewis, Harold J. Stone, Buddy Lester	Comedy	Columbia
Bikini Paradise	Gregg G. Tallas	Janette Scott, Kieron Moore, Kay Walsh	Comedy	Allied Artists
Billion Dollar Brain	Ken Russell	Michael Caine, Karl Malden, Ed Begley	Spy	United Artists
Bonnie and Clyde	Arthur Penn	Warren Beatty, Faye Dunaway, Gene Hackman, Estelle Parsons, Michael J. Pollard	Crime drama	Warner Bros.
The Born Losers	Tom Laughlin	Tom Laughlin, Jane Russell, Jeremy Slate	Drama, action	AIP
The Busy Body	William Castle	Sid Caesar, Robert Ryan, Arlene Golonka, Richard Pryor	Comedy	Paramount
Camelot	Joshua Logan	Richard Harris, Vanessa Redgrave, Franco Nero, David Hemmings	Musical	Warner Bros. Based on the play
The Cape Town Affair	Robert D. Webb	Jacqueline Bisset, James Brolin, Claire Trevor	Drama	Filmed in South Africa 20th Century Fox
The Caper of the Golden Bulls	Russell Rouse	Yvette Mimieux, Stephen Boyd, Giovanna Ralli	Action	Embassy
Caprice	Frank Tashlin	Doris Day, Richard Harris, Irene Tsu	Comedy	Fox Last Fox film shot in Cinemascope
Casino Royale	5 Directors	David Niven, Peter Sellers, Woody Allen, Ursula Andress, Deborah Kerr, Daliah Lavi, Orson Welles	Spy comedy	Columbia; 007 spoof; Remade in 2006 2006 film
Catalina Caper	Lee Sholem	Tommy Kirk, Robert Donner, Lyle Waggoner	Comedy	Crown International
Charlie, the Lonesome Cougar	Winston Hibler	Ron Brown, Brian Russell, Linda Wallace	Family	Disney
The Christmas Kid	Sidney W. Pink	Jeffrey Hunter, Louis Hayward, Perla Cristal	Western	Independent
Chuka	Gordon Douglas	Rod Taylor, Ernest Borgnine, John Mills	Western	Paramount
Clambake	Arthur H. Nadel	Elvis Presley, Shelley Fabares, Will Hutchins, Bill Bixby, James Gregory	Musical	United Artists
C'mon, Let's Live a Little	David Butler	Bobby Vee, Jackie DeShannon, Patsy Kelly	Musical	Paramount
Come Spy with Me	Marshall Stone	Troy Donahue, Andrea Dromm, Albert Dekker	Spy	20th Century Fox
The Comedians	Peter Glenville	Elizabeth Taylor, Richard Burton, Peter Ustinov	Drama	MGM
Cool Hand Luke	Stuart Rosenberg	Paul Newman, George Kennedy, Strother Martin	Drama	Warner Bros. Oscar for Kennedy.
The Cool Ones	Gene Nelson	Roddy McDowall, Debbie Watson, Gil Peterson	Comedy	Warner Bros.
A Covenant with Death	Lamont Johnson	George Maharis, Laura Devon, Earl Holliman	Drama	Warner Bros.
Custer of the West	Robert Siodmak	Robert Shaw, Jeffrey Hunter, Mary Ure, Ty Hardin	Western	Cinerama Releasing
The Desperate Ones	Alexander Ramati	Maximilian Schell, Irene Papas, Raf Vallone	Drama	Independent
Devil's Angels	Burt Topper	John Cassavetes, Beverly Adams, Mimsy Farmer	Biker drama	AIP
The Dirty Dozen	Robert Aldrich	Lee Marvin, Charles Bronson, Telly Savalas, John Cassavetes, Jim Brown, Ernest Borgnine, Robert Ryan, Donald Sutherland, Clint Walker, Trini Lopez	War	MGM
Divorce American Style	Bud Yorkin	Dick Van Dyke, Debbie Reynolds, Jason Robards, Jean Simmons	Comedy	Columbia
Doctor Dolittle	Richard Fleischer	Rex Harrison, Samantha Eggar, Anthony Newley	Fantasy	Fox
Doctor, You've Got to Be Kidding!	Peter Tewksbury	Sandra Dee, George Hamilton, Celeste Holm, Bill Bixby	Comedy	MGM
Don't Make Waves	Alexander MacKendrick	Tony Curtis, Claudia Cardinale, Sharon Tate	Comedy	MGM
Double Trouble	Norman Taurog	Elvis Presley, Annette Day, John Williams, Leon Askin, Yvonne Romain	Musical	MGM

== E-H ==
Title	Director	Cast	Genre	Notes
Easy Come, Easy Go	John Rich	Elvis Presley, Dodie Marshall, Pat Priest, Skip Ward, Pat Harrington Jr., Sandy Kenyon	Musical	Paramount
Eight on the Lam	George Marshall	Bob Hope, Phyllis Diller, Jonathan Winters, Shirley Eaton	Comedy	United Artists
Enter Laughing	Carl Reiner	José Ferrer, Shelley Winters, Reni Santoni, Don Rickles	Comedy	Columbia
The Family Way	John and Roy Boulting	Hayley Mills, Hywel Bennett, John Mills, Murray Head	Comedy, Drama	
Fanny Hill Meets Dr. Erotico	Barry Mahon	Sue Evans, Michael R. Thomas	Science fiction	
Fanny Hill Meets Lady Chatterly	Barry Mahon	Sue Evans, Alex Keen, Sally Singer	Drama	
The Fastest Guitar Alive	Michael D. Moore	Roy Orbison, Joan Freeman, Patricia Donahue	Musical	MGM
The Fearless Vampire Killers	Roman Polanski	Sharon Tate, Roman Polanski	Horror comedy	MGM
Fearless Frank	Philip Kaufman	Jon Voight, Savern Darden	comedy	Independent
First to Fight	Christian Nyby	Chad Everett, Dean Jagger, Gene Hackman	War	Warner Bros.
Fitzwilly	Delbert Mann	Dick Van Dyke, Barbara Feldon, Edith Evans	Comedy	United Artists
The Flim-Flam Man	Irvin Kershner	George C. Scott, Sue Lyon, Harry Morgan	Comedy	Fox
Fort Utah	Lesley Selander	John Ireland, Virginia Mayo, Scott Brady	Western	Paramount
The Fox	Mark Rydell	Sandy Dennis, Keir Dullea, Anne Heywood	Drama	Independent. Co-production with Canada
Games	Curtis Harrington	Simone Signoret, James Caan, Katharine Ross	Horror	Universal
Gentle Giant	James Neilson	Vera Miles, Dennis Weaver, Clint Howard	Family	Paramount
The Glory Stompers	Anthony M. Lanza	Dennis Hopper, Jody McCrea, Chris Noel	Action	AIP
The Gnome-Mobile	Robert Stevenson	Walter Brennan, Karen Dotrice, Matthew Garber, Richard Deacon, Ed Wynn	Fantasy	Disney
Good Morning and... Goodbye!	Russ Meyer	Alaina Capri, Haji	Sexploitation	Independent
The Good, the Bad and the Ugly	Sergio Leone	Clint Eastwood, Eli Wallach, Lee Van Cleef	Western	United Artists
Good Times	William Friedkin	Sonny Bono, Cher, George Sanders	Musical western	Columbia
The Graduate	Mike Nichols	Dustin Hoffman, Anne Bancroft, Katharine Ross	Comedy	Embassy (U.S.); United Artists (International)
Guess Who's Coming to Dinner	Stanley Kramer	Spencer Tracy, Katharine Hepburn, Sidney Poitier	Drama	Columbia. Won two Oscars
A Guide for the Married Man	Gene Kelly	Walter Matthau, Robert Morse, Inger Stevens	Comedy	20th Century Fox. Featured many cameos
Gunfight in Abilene	William Hale	Bobby Darin, Michael Sarrazin, Leslie Nielsen	Western	Universal
Gunn	Blake Edwards	Craig Stevens, Edward Asner, Laura Devon	Mystery	Paramount. Based on the TV series
The Happening	Elliot Silverstein	Anthony Quinn, Faye Dunaway, Michael Parks	Comedy	MGM
The Happiest Millionaire	Norman Tokar	Fred MacMurray, Lesley Ann Warren, Tommy Steele	Musical	Disney
Hell on Wheels	Will Zens	Marty Robbins, John Ashley, Gigi Perreau	Action	Crown International
The Hellcats	Robert F. Slatzer	Ross Hagen, Sonny West (actor), Gus Trikonis	Biker	Crown International
Hells Angels on Wheels	Richard Rush	Jack Nicholson, Adam Roarke, Sabrina Scharf	Biker	Independent
Hillbillys in a Haunted House	Jean Yarbrough	Lon Chaney Jr., John Carradine, Basil Rathbone	Musical, Horror, Comedy	Independent
Hombre	Martin Ritt	Paul Newman, Richard Boone, Fredric March, Diane Cilento, Barbara Rush, Martin Balsam, Margaret Blye	Western	Fox
The Honey Pot	Joseph L. Mankiewicz	Rex Harrison, Susan Hayward, Cliff Robertson, Edie Adams, Capucine	Comedy, mystery	United Artists
The Hostage	Russell S. Doughten Jr.	Don O'Kelly, Harry Dean Stanton, John Carradine	Thriller	Crown International
Hostile Guns	R. G. Springsteen	Tab Hunter, George Montgomery, Yvonne De Carlo	Western	Paramount
Hot Rods to Hell	John Brahm	Dana Andrews, Jeanne Crain, Mimsy Farmer	Drama	MGM
Hotel	Richard Quine	Rod Taylor, Karl Malden, Merle Oberon, Melvyn Douglas, Michael Rennie, Catherine Spaak, Richard Conte	Drama	Warner Bros.
Hour of the Gun	John Sturges	Jason Robards, Robert Ryan, James Garner	Western	United Artists
House of a Thousand Dolls	Jeremy Summers	Vincent Price, Martha Hyer, George Nader	Thriller	AIP
How to Succeed in Business Without Really Trying	David Swift	Robert Morse, Rudy Vallée, Michele Lee, Maureen Arthur	Musical comedy	United Artists; based on the play
Hurry Sundown	Otto Preminger	Michael Caine, Jane Fonda, John Phillip Law, Diahann Carroll, Faye Dunaway, Burgess Meredith	Drama	Paramount

== I-P ==
Title	Director	Cast	Genre	Notes
In Cold Blood	Richard Brooks	Robert Blake, Scott Wilson, Paul Stewart, John Forsythe	Crime drama	Columbia; based on the book
In the Heat of the Night	Norman Jewison	Rod Steiger, Sidney Poitier, Warren Oates, Lee Grant	Crime drama	United Artistsl five Oscars
In Like Flint	Gordon Douglas	James Coburn, Lee J. Cobb, Anna Lee, Jean Hale	Spy spoof	Fox; sequel
The Incident	Larry Peerce	Tony Musante, Martin Sheen, Ruby Dee	Thriller	20th Century Fox
Island of the Lost	John Florea	Richard Greene, Luke Halpin, Irene Tsu	Adventure	Paramount
It's a Bikini World	Stephanie Rothman	Deborah Walley, Tommy Kirk, Bobby Pickett	Comedy	Independent
I Was a Man	Barry Mahon	Ansa Kansas	Docudrama; Exploitation film	Based on the life of Kansas
Jack of Diamonds	Don Taylor	George Hamilton, Joseph Cotten, Marie Laforêt	Crime	MGM
The Jackals	Robert D. Webb	Vincent Price, Bob Courtney, Patrick Mynhardt	Western	20th Century Fox
Journey to the Center of Time	David L. Hewitt	Scott Brady, Anthony Eisley, Gigi Perreau	Science fiction	Independent
The Jungle Book	Wolfgang Reitherman	Bruce Reitherman, Phil Harris, George Sanders	Animation	Disney; based on the book
King Kong Escapes	Ishirō Honda	Akira Takarada, Rhodes Reason	Science fiction	Japanese/American coproduction; Toho Studios Universal
Kill a Dragon	Michael D. Moore	Jack Palance, Fernando Lamas, Aldo Ray	Action	United Artists
The King's Pirate	Don Weis	Doug McClure, Jill St. John, Mary Ann Mobley	Adventure	Universal
The Last Challenge	Richard Thorpe	Glenn Ford, Angie Dickinson, Gary Merrill	Western	MGM
The Longest Hundred Miles	Don Weis	Doug McClure, Katharine Ross, Ricardo Montalbán	War	American/Filipino coproduction; Made-for-TV
The Love-Ins	Arthur Dreifuss	Richard Todd, James MacArthur, Susan Oliver	Drama	Columbia
Luv	Clive Donner	Jack Lemmon, Elaine May, Peter Falk	Comedy	Columbia; based on the play
Mad Monster Party	Jules Bass	Boris Karloff, Allen Swift, Phyllis Diller	Animation	Embassy
Mars Needs Women	Larry Buchanan	Tommy Kirk, Yvonne Craig	Science fiction	A.I.P. Direct to TV
Monkeys, Go Home!	Andrew V. McLaglen	Dean Jones, Yvette Mimieux, Dean Jones	Comedy	Disney
The Night of the Generals	Anatole Litvak	Peter O'Toole, Omar Sharif, Tom Courtenay, Donald Pleasence	War	Columbia
Oh Dad, Poor Dad, Mamma's Hung You in the Closet and I'm Feelin' So Sad	Richard Quine	Rosalind Russell, Robert Morse, Hugh Griffith	Comedy	Paramount
The Perils of Pauline	Herbert B. Leonard, Joshua Shelley	Pat Boone, Pamela Austin Terry-Thomas	Comedy	Universal; Remake of 1947 film
Point Blank	John Boorman	Lee Marvin, Angie Dickinson, Carroll O'Connor, Keenan Wynn, Lloyd Bochner, John Vernon	Crime drama	MGM
The President's Analyst	Theodore J. Flicker	James Coburn, Godfrey Cambridge, Severn Darden	Comedy	Paramount
The Producers	Mel Brooks	Zero Mostel, Gene Wilder, Estelle Winwood	Musical comedy	Embassy; Remade as a 2005 film

== R-Z ==
Title	Director	Cast	Genre	Notes
Red Tomahawk	R. G. Springsteen	Howard Keel, Joan Caulfield, Broderick Crawford	Western	Paramount
Reflections in a Golden Eye	John Huston	Elizabeth Taylor, Marlon Brando, Robert Forster	Drama	Warner Bros.
The Reluctant Astronaut	Edward Montagne	Don Knotts, Leslie Nielsen, Joan Freeman	Comedy	Universal
Return of the Gunfighter	James Neilson	Robert Taylor, Chad Everett, Ana Martín	Western	MGM
The Ride to Hangman's Tree	Alan Rafkin	Jack Lord, James Farentino, Don Galloway	Western	Universal
Riot on Sunset Strip	Arthur Dreifuss	Aldo Ray, Mimsy Farmer, Michael Evans (actor)	Drama	AIP
Rosie!	David Lowell Rich	Rosalind Russell, Sandra Dee, Brian Aherne	Comedy	Universal
Rough Night in Jericho	Arnold Laven	Dean Martin, George Peppard, Jean Simmons	Western	Universal
Run Like a Thief	Bernard Glasser	Kieron Moore, Ina Balin, Keenan Wynn	Comedy crime	Independent
The Scorpio Letters	Richard Thorpe	Alex Cord, Shirley Eaton, Laurence Naismith	Thriller	MGM
The Shooting	Monte Hellman	Warren Oates, Jack Nicholson, Millie Perkins	Western	Independent
The Spirit Is Willing	William Castle	Sid Caesar, Vera Miles, Barry Gordon	Comedy	Paramount
The St. Valentine's Day Massacre	Roger Corman	Jason Robards, George Segal, Ralph Meeker, Jean Hale	Crime drama	Fox
The Taming of the Shrew	Franco Zeffirelli	Elizabeth Taylor, Richard Burton, Michael York	Comedy	Columbia
Tarzan and the Great River	Robert Day	Mike Henry, Jan Murray, Diana Millay	Adventure	Paramount
Thoroughly Modern Millie	George Roy Hill	Julie Andrews, Mary Tyler Moore, Carol Channing	Musical comedy	Universal
Three Bites of the Apple	Alvin Ganzer	David McCallum, Sylva Koscina, Tammy Grimes	Comedy	MGM
Thunder Alley	Richard Rush	Annette Funicello, Fabian, Diane McBain	Sports drama	AIP
The Tiger Makes Out	Arthur Hiller	Eli Wallach, Dustin Hoffman, Anne Jackson	Comedy	Columbia
A Time for Killing	Phil Karlson	Glenn Ford, Inger Stevens, Paul Petersen	Western	Columbia
Tobruk	Arthur Hiller	Rock Hudson, George Peppard, Nigel Green	War	Universal
Tony Rome	Gordon Douglas	Frank Sinatra, Jill St. John, Gena Rowlands, Richard Conte, Simon Oakland, Sue Lyon, Shecky Greene	Crime drama	Fox
Track of Thunder	Joseph Kane	Tommy Kirk, Faith Domergue, Brenda Benet	Drama	United Artists
The Trip	Roger Corman	Peter Fonda, Susan Strasberg, Dennis Hopper	Drama	AIP
Up the Down Staircase	Robert Mulligan	Sandy Dennis, Jean Stapleton	Drama	Warner Bros. Based on the book
Valley of the Dolls	Mark Robson	Patty Duke, Barbara Parkins, Paul Burke, Martin Milner, Susan Hayward, Sharon Tate	Drama	Fox. Based on the book
The Venetian Affair	Jerry Thorpe	Robert Vaughn, Elke Sommer, Felicia Farr	Spy	MGM
Wait Until Dark	Terence Young	Audrey Hepburn, Alan Arkin, Efrem Zimbalist Jr., Richard Crenna	Thriller	Warner Bros.
The War Wagon	Burt Kennedy	John Wayne, Kirk Douglas, Robert Walker Jr.	Western	Universal
Warning Shot	Buzz Kulik	David Janssen, Joan Collins, Stefanie Powers, Eleanor Parker, George Grizzard, Steve Allen, Lillian Gish	Crime drama	Paramount
Waterhole No. 3	William A. Graham	James Coburn, Carroll O'Connor, Margaret Blye	Comedy western	Paramount
The Way West	Andrew V. McLaglen	Kirk Douglas, Robert Mitchum, Richard Widmark, Lola Albright	Western	United Artists
Welcome to Hard Times	Burt Kennedy	Henry Fonda, Janice Rule, Warren Oates, Aldo Ray	Western	MGM
Who's Minding the Mint?	Howard Morris	Jim Hutton, Dorothy Provine, Milton Berle	Comedy	Columbia
Who's That Knocking at My Door	Martin Scorsese	Harvey Keitel, Zina Bethune, Harry Northup	Drama	Independent
Woman Times Seven	Vittorio De Sica	Shirley MacLaine, Peter Sellers, Michael Caine	Anthology	7 stories Embassy
You Only Live Twice	Lewis Gilbert	Sean Connery, Akiko Wakabayasi, Donald Pleasence	Spy, Action	United Artists. Preceded by Thunderball
The Young Warriors	John Peyser	James Drury, Jonathan Daly, Norman Fell	War	Universal

== Documentaries ==
Title	Director	Cast	Genre	Notes
Dont Look Back	D.A. Pennebaker	Bob Dylan, Joan Baez, Donovan	Documentary	
Festival	Murray Lerner	Bob Dylan, Johnny Cash, Joan Baez	Documentary	
Rush to Judgment	Emile de Antonio	Archive footage of Lee Harvey Oswald, Jack Ruby, Earl Warren, Mark Lane	Documentary	
Titicut Follies	Frederick Wiseman		Documentary	

== Other ==
Title	Director	Cast	Genre	Notes
Common Law Cabin	Russ Meyer	Alaina Capri, Adele Rein	Comedy	
The Girl with the Hungry Eyes	William Rotsler	Adele Rein	Sexploitation	
Winchester '73	Herschel Daugherty	Tom Tryon, John Saxon, Dan Duryea	Western	Made for TV; Remake of 1950 film

== See also ==
- List of 1967 box office number-one films in the United States
- AFI Catalog of Feature Films
- 1967 in the United States
