= List of LGBTQ-related films of 1967 =

This is a list of lesbian, gay, bisexual, transgender or queer-related films released in 1967. It contains theatrically released films that deal with important gay, lesbian, bisexual, transgender or queer characters or issues and may have same-sex romance or relationships as a plot device.

== Films ==
| Title | Director | Country | Genre | Cast | Notes |
|---|---|---|---|---|---|
| The Boy and the Wind | Carlos Hugo Christensen | Brazil | Drama | Ênio Gonçalves, Luiz Fernando Ianelli, Wilma Henriques, Odilon Azevedo, Oscar Felipe and Germano Filho | a.k.a. O Menino e o Vento |
| Fanny Hill Meets Dr. Erotico | Barry Mahon | United States | Science fiction | Sue Evans, Michael R. Thomas | |
| Fanny Hill Meets Lady Chatterly | Barry Mahon | United States | Drama | Sue Evans, Alex Keen, Sally Singer | |
| The Fearless Vampire Killers | Roman Polanski | United States | Comedy, horror | Jack MacGowran, Roman Polanski, Sharon Tate, Alfie Bass, Ferdy Mayne, Terry Downes, Fiona Lewis, Iain Quarrier, Jessie Robins, Ronald Lacey, Sydney Bromley, Andreas Malandrinos, Otto Diamant, Matthew Walters and Vladek Sheybal | |
| The Fox | Mark Rydell | United States, Canada | Drama | Sandy Dennis, Anne Heywood and Keir Dullea | Based on the novella of the same name by D. H. Lawrence |
| The Girl with the Hungry Eyes | William Rotsler | United States | | Adele Rein, Cathy Crowfoot | |
| I Was a Man | Barry Mahon | United States | Docudrama/Exploitation film | Ansa Kansas | Based on the life of Kansas |
| Portrait of Jason | Shirley Clarke | United States | Drama/documentary | Jason Holliday, Shirley Clarke and Carl Lee | |
| The Producers | Mel Brooks | United States | Comedy | Zero Mostel, Gene Wilder | |
| Reflections in a Golden Eye | John Huston | United States | Drama | Marlon Brando, Elizabeth Taylor, Brian Keith, Julie Harris, Zorro David and Robert Forster | Based on the novel of the same name by Carson McCullers |
