= Fanny Hill Meets the Red Baron =

1968 American drama film

- Film poster
- Directed by: Barry Mahon
- Produced by: Barry Mahon
- Starring: Sue Evans; Kristen Steen; Cherie Winters
- Production companies: Barry Mahon Productions; John F. Rickert Productions
- Distributed by: Chancellor Films
- Release date: September 1968
- Running time: 72 minutes
- Country: United States
- Language: English

Fanny Hill Meets the Red Baron is a 1968 drama exploitation film. The film was produced and directed by Barry Mahon. The film stars Kristen Steen, Cherie Winters and Sue Evans, reprising her role as Fanny Hill. The movie was released in September 1968. The film is the final one in a series of Fanny Hill movies made by Mahon. (Note: Fanny Hill Meets Lady Chatterly is the first film in the series, followed by Fanny Hill Meets Dr. Erotico.)

== Plot ==
When German World War I fighter pilot Red Baron starts experiencing engine trouble over British airspace, he has no choice but to go down behind enemy lines. After landing, he camouflages his plane, stumbles upon a dead soldier, and disguise himself by changing into his uniform. Now posing as a soldier from Belgium, he locates a hospital where he finds the nursing staff raising the patients spirits by joining in with them in a variety of sexual activities, along with each other. Fanny Hill is one of those nurses.

The Baron leaves the officers, and begins plotting to free a German prisoner of war, who is supposed to drop off engine parts at the hospital, so he can repair his plane. The prisoner manages to escape during a wild sex party arranged by the nurses. With nothing to do but wait, the Baron decides to join in with the party.

Meanwhile, Fanny's boyfriend, also a pilot, who has been recently released from the hospital, is jealous of the Baron, and sets out to expose him as an imposter. The next morning, Fanny's boyfriend flies to the hospital to report what he has discovered. But a German plane has already delivered the parts the Baron needs to repair his plane, and he is back in the air.

The Red Baron encounters Fanny's boyfriend in the air, but his gun has jammed, and the Baron, true to his code, refuses to shoot down a defenseless pilot. So he heads back to Germany, leaving the pilot to continue his sexual affair with Fanny.

== Cast ==
- Sue Evans as Fanny
- Kristen Steen as a nurse
- Cherie Winters as a nurse

== Background ==
Mahon said it only took him two days to write the Red Baron film, noting it took longer to type than to write. He also stated he has never read Fanny Hill, and admits he is not Mike Nichols, but opines that he "can make a picture cheaper than anybody else, and with quality in it." He goes on to say that "if I can make money on Fanny Hill, I make it, but we make them with integrity." Mahon was a pilot for the Royal Air Force, and was a fan of World War I planes and used them in the movie.

== Release ==
The film was released in September 1968. In May 1969, days before the movie was scheduled to be released in Old Bethpage, New York, the theater was shut down by the local police for showing a purported obscene film; patrons walked out chuckling over the incident, with one moviegoer seen pestering a detective as to when the theater was going to reopen, because he did not want to miss Fanny Hill and the Red Baron.

== Critical reception and analysis ==
The Toronto Star said "Mahon's Fanny Hill movies are to the bosom film business of the 60s what Andy Hardy movies were to MGM in the 40s." Louis Botto from True Magazine said the film was one of the "funniest sex flicks" he had ever seen.

American author Eddie Muller wrote that Mahon was one of the "most prolific makers of adults only films, and made a cottage industry out of exploiting the name Fanny Hill", and now with the Red Baron, has continued with the exploitation. Author William E. Burrows noted that this film is one of two that was made since the Red Baron began appearing in the Peanuts comic strip. He also highlighted the film's tagline: "Dog-fights as hot-blooded Fanny meets the cold-hearted Ace!"

Film historian Bill Warren agreed with Muller, writing that Mahon was one of "the busiest makers of true exploitation films in the 1960s." He also referenced the Fanny Hill series, as being found in "this rather sleazy area of moviemaking". He went on to say that since the name "Fanny Hill" was in the public domain, "Mahon, nothing loath, grabbed the name and ran with it, even dragging in the Red Baron, fixed in the popular mind by Charles Schultz's Peanuts."

== See also ==
- List of American films of 1968
- List of LGBTQ-related films of 1968
- Nudity in film
