= Fanny Hill Meets Lady Chatterly =

1967 American drama film

- Film poster
- Directed by: Barry Mahon; George Matsui
- Produced by: Barry Mahon
- Starring: Sue Evans; Alex Keen; Sally Singer
- Production company: Barry Mahon Productions
- Distributed by: Chancellor Films
- Release date: July 20, 1967; (San Francisco)
- Running time: 71 minutes
- Country: United States
- Language: English
- Box office: $150,000

Fanny Hill Meets Lady Chatterly is a 1967 drama exploitation film. The film was produced by Barry Mahon, and directed by Mahon and George Matsui. The film stars Sue Evans, Alex Keen and Sally Singer. The movie was released in July 1967. The film is the first in a series of Fanny Hill movies made by Mahon. (Note: Lady Chatterly is the first film in the series, followed by Fanny Hill Meets Dr. Erotico, and then Fanny Hill Meets the Red Baron)

== Plot ==
Lady Chatterly is a well-known courtesan in high society who maintains a castle in the country that serves as a private retreat for visiting members of London royalty. In her capacity as hostess, she receives generous compensation for arranging and overseeing their trysts and wild orgies. When Fanny Hill arrives at her doorstep one day looking for employment, she is hired to work as a servant girl at the castle.

Peter, who already works at the estate as a stable boy, introduces himself, and becomes her guide into a world of sexual pleasure. Meanwhile, Lady Chatterly is planning a masquerade ball in honor of a rich and prominent American, who owns a large tobacco plantation. He has offered Lady Chatterly and her broker 10,000 acres of farmland in Virginia, in exchange for a formal introduction to a princess from Hungary.

When the Hungarian princess suddenly cancels at the last minute, Lady Chatterly devises a scheme, whereby she can still get the Virginia farmland, by replacing the princess with Fanny, without the American being any the wiser. In the meantime, Peter has become upset because Fanny is ignoring him, in favor of Lady Chatterly, with whom she is now in a lesbian relationship.

Before Lady Chatterly can hatch her devious scheme, Peter overhears about the plan, and goes to a tavern where he just happens to run into the American. Peter informs the tobacco magnate about the planned deception, and the American is enraged. He then decides to retaliate by sending a heavily disguised Peter to impersonate him. He gives Peter a bogus deed to the Virginia farmland, while also generously compensating Peter for being complicit in his retaliation. Peter arrives at the ball, and is not recognized, so he spends the night partying and frolicking with Fanny. He also hands over the bogus deed to Lady Chatterly. The film ends with Peter happily absconding to London with the money the American has given him.

== Cast ==
- Sue Evans as Fanny
- Alex Keen as Peter
- Sally Singer as Lady Chatterly

== Release ==
The movie was released on July 20, 1967, in San Francisco. The film had a gross of $150,000. In June 1968, the movie was subjected to censorship in Jacksonville Beach, Florida when the city resorted to shutting off the electricity and water to a theater a few minutes before the movie was to be shown. The mayor said the "city didn't want any such goings on here and if I have to resort to jail, I'll do it." The following month, the theater was back open and allowed to show an edited version of the film.

== Reception ==
Thomas Haroldson wrote in the Fifth Estate that "the picture has a plot, which is more than most skin films can claim; the story holds together surprisingly well." He complimented the period costumes as being "rich and colorful", but had harsh words for the actors, opining "the people appearing in the film are not professional actors, and they seem to go out of their way to prove it; I’m certain that anyone, anywhere, at any time, could give a better performance."

== Critical analysis ==
Film historian Thomas Leitch cites the Fanny Hill series by Mahon, along with other titles, as being representative of several sexploitation films that were built around the character Fanny Hill from the novel and that obviously deviated from the source text. He argues that Hill "came simply to signal sexual licentiousness, the character being relocated in place and time as a symbol of sexual availability in films."

Film critic Alan Jones commented that "hot-blooded sexploitation [films] were all about steamy girl-on-girl action." He also noted that the audiences at these films were "predominantly male", and they "never had a problem with women lusting after each other" ... like the "ultimate pudenda pairing in Fanny Hill Meets Lady Chatterly." American author Malinda Lo observed that the 1960s saw the release of hundreds of soft-core "dykesploitation" films that appealed to straight men's fantasies, highlighting Fanny Hill Meets Lady Chatterly as a notable example.

== See also ==
- List of American films of 1967
- List of LGBTQ-related films of 1967
- Nudity in film
