= The Dead One (1961 film) =

1961 American independent horror film by Barry Mahon

- Theatrical release poster
- Directed by: Barry Mahon
- Written by: Barry Mahon
- Produced by: Barry Mahon; Brandon Chase
- Starring: John McKay; Linda Ormond; Monica Davis; Clyde Kelly; Darlene Myrick
- Cinematography: Mark Dennis
- Edited by: Alan Smiler
- Release date: 1961
- Running time: 71 minutes
- Country: United States
- Language: English

The Dead One (also known as Blood of the Zombie) is a 1961 American independent horror film written, produced and directed by Barry Mahon. It stars John McKay, Linda Ormond, Monica Davis and Clyde Kelly. The narrative follows two cousins—one a businessman (McKay), the other a woman who practices Voodoo (Davis)—who each seek control of their family's Louisiana plantation.

The film's significance is that it is a regional film, one of the first two zombie films to be filmed in color, and was thought to be a lost film before its rediscovery and issuance on DVD, 41 years after it was made.

== Plot ==
During a Voodoo rite at Kenilworth, a Louisiana plantation, Monica Carlton (Monica Davis), mistress of the plantation, raises her brother Jonas (Clyde Kelly) from the dead. She commands him to kill "a woman who is coming to the plantation." The woman is Linda Carlton (Linda Ormond), who has just married Monica's cousin John Carlton (John McKay) and who will arrive for their honeymoon right after John shows her the swinging nightspots of Bourbon Street in New Orleans. On their way to Kenilworth, they find exotic dancer Bella Bella (Darlene Myrick) stranded, her car broken down. They take her to the plantation for the night as it is too late to have her car repaired.

The next morning, they learn that Bella's car can't be fixed for another day, so she must spend a second night at Kenilworth. John shows Linda around the plantation, including the slave quarters, where Monica's voodoo rites are now held, and the family crypt, which holds eight generations of Carltons, including Jonas. John tells her that Jonas had dumped the Creole girl he was to marry and shortly afterwards became mortally ill. He says that no one knows what Jonas died from, but Monica, who has entered the crypt, says that Jonas's death "came from a power stronger than any of your stupid religions have ever known"‚a Voodoo curse placed on Jonas by the Creole girl.

John and Monica later discuss John's visit. John says that their grandfather's will passes Kenilworth to him as soon as he marries. Monica issues a veiled threat, asking what would happen if Linda died before John took legal possession. After dinner, Monica goes to another Voodoo rite. Bella calls her "kooky" and John tells her that "No intelligent person believes in Voodoo."

At the rite, Monica again summons zombie Jonas and commands him to "kill the girl" to prevent John from inheriting the plantation and thereby ending her Voodoo practice. But Jonas doesn't know that there are two girls—Linda and Bella—and he kills Bella. He can't find Linda because she and John are spying on the rite.

Back at the house, Linda discovers that Bella has gone missing. When she and John find her body, John phones the police. Monica realizes that the wrong girl is dead and in a new rite tells Jonas once more to kill Linda. John gives Linda his pistol, then leaves to break up the rite. Jonas enters the house, hides when he hears John coming down the stairs, then goes up for Linda. She shoots him without effect. But then he suddenly walks away without her as John has successfully stopped the rite.

John and Linda go to the crypt and find Jonas's empty tomb. Zombie Jonas comes in and is again unfazed when John shoots him. Monica rushes into the crypt, screaming that Jonas must get back into his tomb because the sun is rising. The police arrive and in shooting at Jonas, kill Monica. Jonas starts to attack the officers, but vanishes in a puff of smoke when the sunlight hits him.

John explains to the police what has happened. A hearse arrives, the police leave, and John plants a "For Sale" sign outside Kenilworth as he and Linda drive away.

== Cast ==
- John McKay as John Carlton
- Linda Ormond as Linda Carlton
- Monica Davis as Monica Carlton
- Clyde Kelly as Jonas Carlton
- Darlene Myrick as Bella Bella
- Lacey Kelly as Lacey
- Paula Maurice as "The 500 Club" Proprietress
- Robert Henderson
- Wilson Scott
- The Joe Burton Trio as the Night Club Band
- Joe Jones Orchestra as the Dixieland Jazz Band
- George Trussell
- Jean Wade
- Herman Alfonso
- Lloyd Gutierrez
- Alton Fobb
- Richard Thomas Washington
- Andrea Chase as Bridesmaid

Uncredited:

- Joe Burton as Joe Burton

== Production ==
The Dead One is a regional horror film, according to critic Brian Albright. He defines a regional film as one that is "(a) filmed outside of the general professional and geographical confines of Hollywood, (b) produced independently, and (c) made with a cast and crew made up primarily of residents of the states in which the film was shot." The Dead One was filmed on location in New Orleans, Louisiana by the independent Mardi Gras Films, which produced only one other movie, Face of Fire, made in association with AB Svensk Filmidustri. Little is known about the actors and production crew of The Dead One, other than that a number of them worked on one or more of the 60 films Mahon had directed by 1970.

The Dead One was shot in Eastmancolor and Ultrascope, a "form of Cinemascope from Germany" with an aspect ratio of 1.85:1. It is significantly one of the first two zombie movies to be filmed in color, the other being the British Doctor Blood's Coffin. Both films were released in 1961, but it is "hard to know which one officially hit theaters [in the US] first. Before the era of simultaneous wide releases, a few prints would make their way across the country to unimpressed audiences, and which full color zombie you saw first would simply have depended on where you lived."

== Distribution ==
In addition to being regionally-made, The Dead One was apparently shown at least stateside. In America, it is believed to have been exhibited only in the southern part of the country and most likely only at drive-in theaters, where it "served as a time filler" as the second feature on a double bill, when "the young people [in the audience] had more to do than watch some miserable collection of color and movement on the screen." Film critic Glenn Kay notes that "After its appropriately short run at drive-in theaters, prints of the film began to vanish. Until very recently it was thought to be a lost film, but then it was rediscovered and is now available on DVD ...."

The theatrical runtime was 71 minutes, but this was reduced to 55 minutes for its DVD release.

The film was distributed to North American theaters by Mardi Gras Productions in 1961. Internationally, it was distributed theatrically in the UK during 1962 by Grand National Pictures. Mexican distribution was handled by Peliculas Agrasanchez S.A., although at an unknown date. For individual home viewing, widescreen DVDs of the film were distributed in the US by Something Weird Video in 2002 and by Shriek Show in 2003.

The Dead One was granted an X-certificate for theatrical exhibition in the UK by the British Board of Film Classification, which meant that the film was considered "more suitable for adults." The DVD, released in 2005, was given a 12-certification, suggesting that its content is suitable for those age 12 and over.

== Reception ==
BoxOffice magazine, in the review in its issue of 3 April 1961, said that the "sizable audience" for voodoo and horror films "meant a waiting market for this latest though moderately entertaining effort ... None of the actors will mean much, although it is a foregone conclusion that the horror addicts aren't overly concerned with known thespian values." The actors "plod dutifully enough along under producer Barry Mahon's rather uninspired direction." The magazine gave The Dead One a rating of "fair" on its poor-to-excellent spectrum in its "Review Digest" weekly feature. The pressbook for the movie encouraged theater owners to lure patrons by advertising that they were giving away "Free voodoo dolls with real hair with every adult ticket. Put a hex on your friends."

Later reviews of the film have been almost entirely negative. Film critic Jamie Russell writes that "Belly dancers, voodoo superstition and a honeymoon on a New Orleans plantation pad out this threadbare and thoroughly stilted early 1960s effort," adding that "If it were not for the jaw-dropping Ed Wood-level thespian efforts, this would be instantly forgettable." McKinney also notes the "wooden acting," but attributes it to the "principle actors" being "novices and nonprofessionals. The ones with even a handful of credits are actors who served with Mahon in other pictures." For example, Davis and McKay appear together in Mahon's science fiction film Rocket Attack U.S.A. (1958), but each was also in other, suggestively-titled and little-known films directed by Mahon. Davis appeared in 1,000 Shapes of a Female (1963), The Swap and How They Make It (1965) and The Pill (1967), while McKay was in Cuban Rebel Girls (1959).

Kay is also unimpressed with The Dead One. He writes that "The beginning will certainly horrify, as newlyweds John and Linda ... take an unnecessarily long trip to Bourbon Street in New Orleans and watch a seemingly endless string of performers ... all to pad the running time by a full twenty minutes." Otherwise, 'there's noting remotely scary" about the film, including the "green zombie makeup over [Jonas's] face and hands," which "shows some decay." Jonas is perhaps an early version of what academic film historian Peter Dendle calls the "new-style zombie that would come into its own increasingly in the 60s: the visibly rotting cadaver" which "clearly" violated "some unspoken taboo against portraying human cadavers decomposing."

Albright points out a lack of originality in the movie. "The plot of this film is basically lifted from the old black-cast exploitation quickie The Devil's Daughter (1939), but with zombies," he writes. And in keeping with the notion of a "black cast"—all the plantation workers in the film are African-American—Kay notes that "The only thing that might qualify as disturbing is the negative stereotypes of black men. They all come across as frightening, ritual-performing, zombie-raising threats to the more 'cultured' leads," all of whom are white.

American film historian Bill Warren and British critic Phil Hardy are even more-to-the-point. Warren writes that Mahon's "budgets were among the lowest for theatrical films, and the results reflected this, as well as the haste and lack of care that went into the film's making." Hardy, who refers to Mahon as a "nudie-specialist" and "one of the first sex-movie tycoons," simply calls The Dead One "abominably acted, scripted and directed."
