= I Was a Man =

1967 American docudrama film

- Film poster
- Directed by: Barry Mahon
- Produced by: Barry Mahon
- Starring: Ansa Kansas
- Production company: Barry Mahon Productions
- Distributed by: Sack Amusement Enterprises
- Release date: November 2, 1967; (San Francisco)
- Running time: 70 minutes
- Country: United States
- Language: English

I Was a Man is a 1967 docudrama film produced and directed by Barry Mahon. The film is based on the life of Ansa Kansas, and her ultimate journey to Finland where she undergoes a sex change operation. The movie is widely considered to be an example of an exploitation film. The film was released in November 1967, and is also available through Something Weird Video.

== Synopsis ==
Ansa Kansas portrays her own life story as a Finnish immigrant in New York City. (Note: This article uses she/her pronouns.) While still presenting as a man, she is seen working at her job as a merchant marine, often pulling duty in the kitchen. The film shows her going out with her co–workers to bars, where they are easily picking up girls, while she has a hard time engaging in the "typical masculine carousing".

When she is by herself, she is filmed at an outing to Coney Island, where she dressed up as a woman. In another scene, while shopping for nightgowns in a ladies department store, she has to hide in a dressing room, after a close friend shows up.

She finally decides to see a doctor in New York about transitioning, but is told she is too old to transition. Undeterred, she flies to Helsinki to transition, and then returns to New York, where she comes out to her co–workers and friends who are surprised, but also understanding. She quits her job as a merchant marine, and becomes a nightclub entertainer. The film ends with Kansas celebrating her own happiness, while also advocating for a better future for those who follow in her footsteps.

== Release and home media ==
The film had its premiere on November 2, 1967, in San Francisco. In 1969, The New York Times reported that Mahon, a "well-known maker of nudie films", had a lien against him for $12,344 by Arta Laboratory, for charges that included processing and printing of multiple films, as well as storage fees for those films. I Was a Man was one of those multiple films that Arta auctioned off to satisfy the lien. In 2014, The Moving Image said that Mahon's films had found a home at Something Weird Video. In 2021, according to Cultpix Radio, Something Weird has a copy of the film.

== Critical analysis and reception ==
The authors of Corpses, Fools and Monsters opined that while the film has its roots in the exploitation genre, it is still unique, in that it offers "enduring truths about the untenable existence of trans people who live in secrecy." In addition, the authors argue that the film's transition narrative was unusual for its time, as evidenced by its sincerity, and the director's decision to allow a real trans woman to share her personal story. They also noted that "the presence of the trans person in the exploitation genre was often to serve as a fetish object with little agency or internality, and usually without involving a trans person in the trans role; in that regard, this movie is a rare but notable exception."

Author Richard Benash stated that the film is "rather tame", considering the year it was made. He further noted that Mahon had numerous credits in his career, "mostly helming short nudie films, and while it contains the requisite nudity, there is hardly anything in the film that could be called truly shocking." He also criticized Mahon, saying that he really is not "terribly interested in the actual life experiences of transgender persons, even though his film is generally sympathetic toward its lead character."

Fiery Films wrote that "whatever the reasons for the apparent taboo on the subject by other producers – whether the difficulties involved in telling such a story or the fear of rejection of such a picture by a puritanical society – Mahon has dived in head first and met the subject face to face." Bill Landis wrote in Sleazoid Express that Mahon is known for his multiple contributions to the sexploitation genre, and in this film, he "sticks to his lurid exploitation blueprints by throwing in titty-shaking belly dances to satisfy any fans who'd showed up for a sex spectacle."

The Central Finland Film Centre opined that "this documentary rarity can be seen as a pioneering film in terms of its subject matter, from a time when trans women were not seen on the big screen, but the fact that the film was directed by the 'Henry Ford of exploitation', (i.e. Barry Mahon), brings its own tone to the treatment of the subject." They also observed that the combination of a sex exploitation film and the cinéma vérité style, makes this a "screen rarity, and can therefore be recommended as a curiosity true to its genre and time, more than as a provider of progressive perspectives."

== See also ==
- List of American films of 1967
- List of LGBTQ-related films of 1967
- Nudity in film
- Renée Richards
