= Charlotte Stewart =

American actress (born 1941)

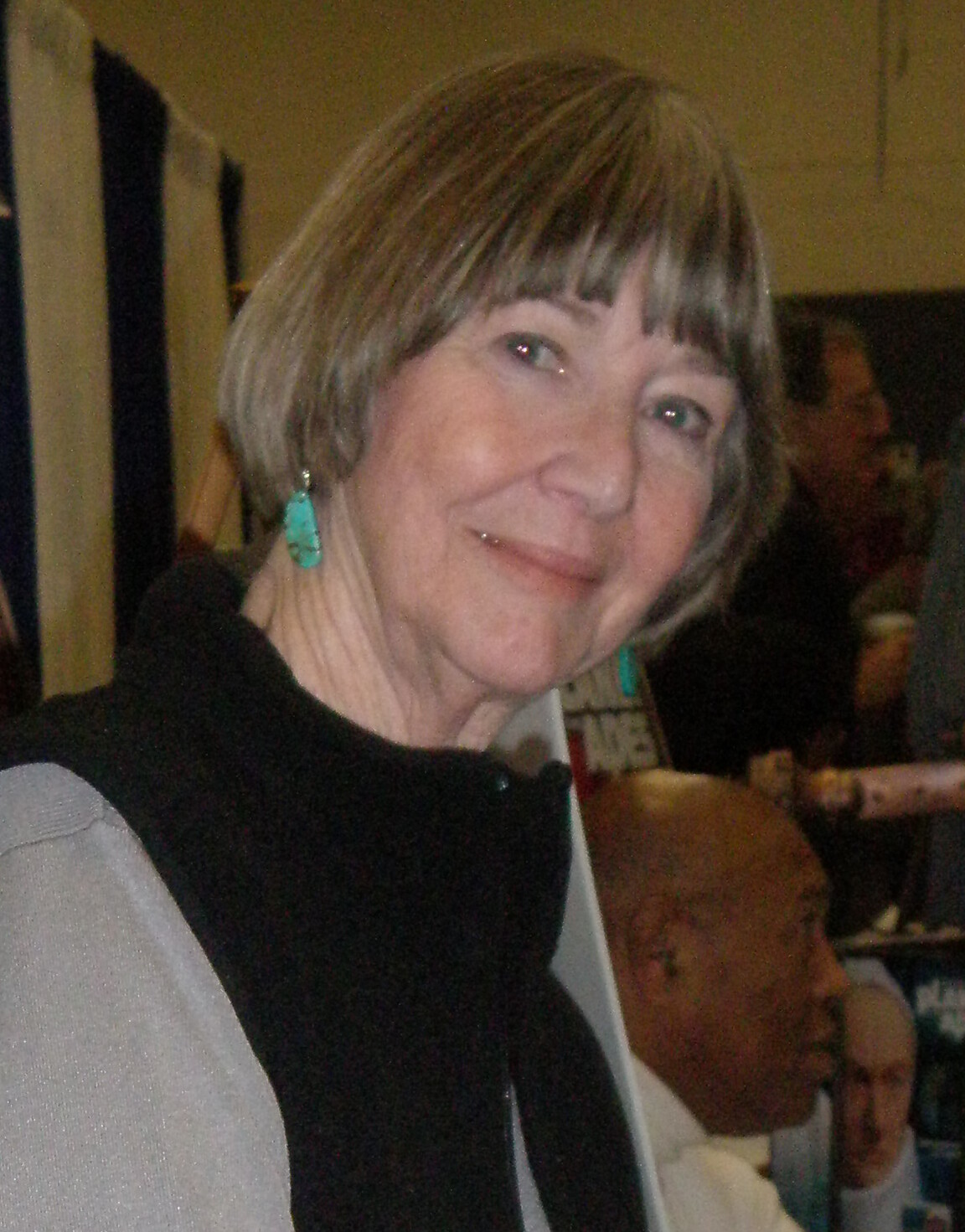
- Stewart in 2009
- Born: February 27, 1941 (age 85); Yuba City, California, U.S.
- Occupation: Actress
- Years active: 1952–present
- Notable work: Eva Beadle Simms in Little House on the Prairie
- Spouse(s): Tim Considine (m. 1965; div. 1969) Jordan Hahn (divorced) David Banks (m. 1992; died 2012) Michael Santos (m. 2015)

Charlotte Stewart (born February 27, 1941) is an American film and television actress. She is most famous for her role as the school teacher Eva Beadle Simms on Little House on the Prairie and her work with director David Lynch.

== Early life ==
Stewart was born February 27, 1941 in Yuba City, California. She graduated from the Pasadena Playhouse.

== Career ==
Her first acting job was in the 1960 episode "The Glass Cage" on The Loretta Young Show. She has guest-starred on many television series ranging from Bonanza to The Office and the recurring role of Betty Briggs on Twin Peaks. She was also a prolific TV commercial actress. Her notable film appearances include Eraserhead and Tremors.

In 2016, Stewart self-published her memoirs in a book, Little House in the Hollywood Hills.

== Personal life ==
Stewart has been married four times. In 1961, she met her first husband, Tim Considine, when she played Agnes Finley in the season-one episode "Deadline" of My Three Sons. They married in 1965 and divorced in 1969. Her second marriage to magician Jordan Hahn lasted from the late 1970s to the early 1980s. In 1992, Stewart married her third husband, David Banks. Following his death in 2012, she began a relationship with Michael Santos, and they married in 2015.

== Filmography ==
=== Film ===
Year	Title	Role	Notes
1961	V.D.	Judy Jackson	The film was also billed as "Damaged Goods"
1965	The Slender Thread	Telephone operator	
1967	Doctor, You've Got to Be Kidding!	Miss Reynolds	credited as Charlotte Considine
1967	The Girl with the Hungry Eyes	One of the girls	
1968	Speedway	Lori	credited as Charlotte Considine
1970	The Cheyenne Social Club	Mae	
1977	Eraserhead	Mary X	
1981	Buddy Buddy	Nurse	
1982	Human Highway	Charlotte Goodnight	
1984	Irreconcilable Differences	Sally	
1985	UFOria	Brother Roy's Girlfriend	
1989	Journey to the Center of the Earth	Mother	
1990	Tremors	Nancy Sterngood	
1992	Twin Peaks: Fire Walk with Me	Betty Briggs	Scenes deleted
1994	Dark Angel: The Ascent	Mother Theresa	
1998	Slums of Beverly Hills	Landlady	
1999	Desert Son	Audrey	
2000	Puppy Love	Edna Luster	Short
2001	Tremors 3: Back to Perfection	Nancy Sterngood	Direct to video
2009	The Inner Circle	Sister Angeline	
2010	Mayfly	Barbara	Short

=== Television ===
Year	Series	Role	Notes
1961	My Three Sons	Agnes Finley	episode: "Deadline"
1961	Bachelor Father	Maybelle	
1968	Hawaii Five-O	Ann	episode: "They Painted Daisies on His Coffin"
1968	Gunsmoke	Iris	episode: "Lyle's Kid", credited as Charlotte Considine
1969	Bonanza	Lisa Campbell	episode: "The Stalker"
1969	Medical Center	Jane Minter	episode: "The Crooked Mile" credited as Charlotte Stewart"
1969	Then Came Bronson	Lori	episode: "A Famine Where Abundance Lies"
1969	The F.B.I.	Ginny Haslett	episode: "Flight" credited as Charlotte Stewart"
1970	Gunsmoke	Jenny	episode "Morgan"
1971	Mannix	Barbara	episode: "Run till Dark"
1971	Bonanza	Betsy Rush	episode: "The Grand Swing"
1971	Medical Center	Connie Marlowe	episode: "Perfection of Vices"
1972	McMillan & Wife	Sheila	episode: "Terror Times Two"
1972	The Waltons	Ruth	Pilot episode: "The Foundling"
1972	The F.B.I.	Helen Simms	episode: "A Game of Chess"
1973	Cannon	Dawn	episode: "Hard Rock Roller Coaster"
1974	Gunsmoke	Miss Merkle	
1974	Little House on the Prairie	Eva Beadle Simms	Seasons 1–4
1975	The Nurse Killer	Suzie	
1975	The Impostor	Jean Durham	
1977	Murder in Peyton Place	Denise Haley	TV movie
1977	Secrets	Phyllis Turner	
1978	Mother, Juggs & Speed	Iris	TV movie
1981	The Princess and the Cabbie	Nurse	
1981	Bitter Harvest	Mrs Lazlo	TV movie
1985	Highway to Heaven	Cindy	Two episodes
1986	Matlock	Mrs. Spellman	episode: "The Santa"
1986	The Young and the Restless	Tamra Logan	12 episodes
1987	Warm Hearts, Cold Feet	Nurse #1	
1990	Twin Peaks	Betty Briggs	
1995	Beverly Hills, 90210	Mary Ellen Bradley	Episode: “Courting” - Season 5, episode 27
2005	Cold Case	Cindy Balducci	episode: "A Perfect Day"
2007	The Office	Woman	episode: "The Return"
2017	Twin Peaks: The Return	Betty Briggs	
