= Santa and the Ice Cream Bunny =

- Theatrical release poster
- Directed by: Richard Winer (credited as R. Winer); Film-within-the-film: Barry Mahon
- Written by: Richard Winer
- Produced by: Barry Mahon
- Starring: Jay Clark
- Narrated by: Dorothy Brown Green
- Cinematography: Richard Winer; Wraparound material: William Tobin
- Edited by: Richard Winer; Wraparound material: Steve Cuiffo
- Music by: Richard Winer; Thumbelina: Ralph Falco; George Linsenmann; Jack and the Beanstalk: Eugene Ventresca
- Distributed by: R & S Film Enterprises Inc.
- Release date: December 1972
- Running time: 96 minutes
- Country: United States
- Language: English

Santa and the Ice Cream Bunny is a 1972 American musical fantasy film written, composed, shot, edited and directed by Richard Winer to frame Barry Mahon's Childhood Productions films for a Christmas release. The plot concerns Santa Claus' attempts to free his sleigh from the sands of a Florida beach, assisted by local children.

Different prints feature one of two films-within-the-film (that take up a majority of the film itself). They are Mahon's previously filmed 1970 adaptations of Hans Christian Andersen's Thumbelina or Benjamin Tabart's Jack and the Beanstalk.

== Plot ==
A few days before Christmas, in Santa's workshop at the North Pole, Santa's elves lament (via song) about how they make toys while Santa is away. Santa's reindeer return, but without Santa or his sleigh, prompting the elves to wonder (again in song) what has happened to Santa. Meanwhile, Santa has crash-landed on a beach in Dania Beach, Florida, gotten his sleigh stuck in the sand, and been abandoned by his reindeer. Santa sings, bemoaning his predicament, then falls asleep.

In his sleep, Santa telepathically summons several local children, who run to him and offer to help. Santa explains that they must find a way to pull his sleigh from the sand, as he cannot abandon it. The kids bring Santa several animals to pull the sleigh, including a horse, a donkey, a cow, a sheep, a pig and a gorilla (depicted by a man in a gorilla suit).

Meanwhile, Tom Sawyer and Huckleberry Finn watch and comment on the action from a distance.

When all attempts fail, Santa encourages them not to give up hope, and begins to tell them the story of Thumbelina as an example. The film then cuts away to instead show Barry Mahon's previously produced film version of Thumbelina, in which a girl visits the now-defunct theme park Pirates World, hears the story in a Hans Christian Andersen attraction, and imagines herself as the title character. The Mahon film plays in its entirety, complete with its original credits sequence, and runs twice as long as the frame narrative (alternate prints use another Mahon fairy tale adaptation, Jack and the Beanstalk, as Santa's story).

Afterwards, Santa again encourages the children to "always believe" and they go off to find help. Santa takes off his coat and again falls asleep. He wakes up to the sound of an antique fire engine, which is being driven by the titular Ice Cream Bunny, whom the children's dog Rebel has summoned. The Ice Cream Bunny drives the children through Pirates World to the beach. Santa puts on his coat to prepare to meet them. He thanks the children for their help and accepts the Ice Cream Bunny's offer to drive him back to the North Pole. Santa reminds the children one last time to always have faith when Santa and the Ice Cream Bunny depart.

The children realize that Santa's sleigh is still stuck in the sand. As they wonder what to do, the sleigh abruptly teleports to the North Pole, where it will lie in wait for Santa's return.

== Cast ==
- Jay Ripley as Santa Claus (billed as Jay Clark)
- Charlie and David as fighting kids
- Kathy as skateboard girl
- Mike as skateboard donkey boy
- Kim Nicholas as donkey girl / doll elf
- Robin as Rebel's owner
- Sandy as boy jumping off roof
- Scotty as batter
- Steve as catcher

=== Thumbelina ===
- Shay Garner as Thumbelina
- Pat Morrell as Mrs. Mole
- Bob O'Connell as Mr. Mole
- Ruth McMahon as mother
- Heather Grinter as the witch
- Sue Cable as flower girl
- Mike Yuenger as flower prince

=== Jack and the Beanstalk ===
- Mitchell Poulos as Jack
- Dorothy Stokes as Jack's mother
- Renato Boracherro as Rosemary's Boyfriend
- Chris Brooks as Honest John
- John Loomis as the giant
- Sami Sims as Giant's wife
- George Wadsworth as Villager

== Home media ==
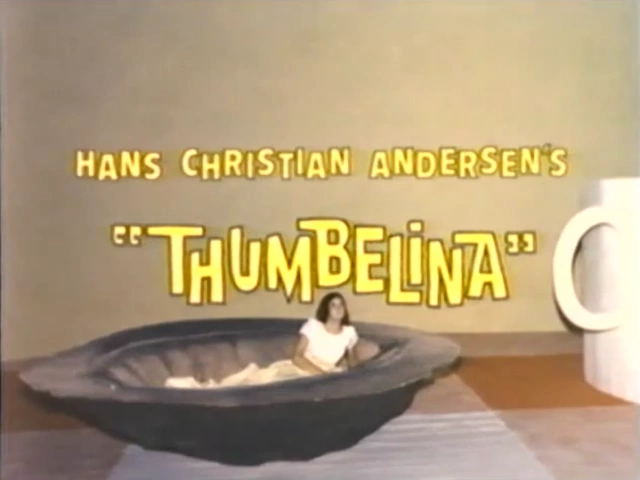
Thumbelina Title Card.

The Thumbelina version was released on VHS by United Home Video, but is different from the theatrical version in that the film Thumbelina is shown after the Santa portion, rather than during it.

The Jack and the Beanstalk version has not been released on video, but the included film was released on DVD by Image Entertainment in 2002.

It was also part of Weird Christmas on Fandor.

== Reception and legacy ==
=== RiffTrax version ===
On December 17, 2010, RiffTrax released Santa and the Ice Cream Bunny, with their synchronous commentary, as a "Video on Demand" download. It has since been made available on DVD as well by Legend Films as well as an extended in-studio edition and has been hosted as a Rifftrax title on streaming services.

On December 3, 2015, RiffTrax presented a live screening of Santa and the Ice Cream Bunny in theaters across the United States. For this performance, the alternate Jack and the Beanstalk version was used. It is considered one of their popular titles and had clips later featured in RiffTrax: The Game.

== See also ==
- List of American films of 1972
- List of Christmas films
- Santa Claus in film
