= Fanny Hill Meets Dr. Erotico =

1967 American docudrama film

- Film poster
- Directed by: Barry Mahon
- Produced by: Barry Mahon
- Starring: Sue Evans; Michael R. Thomas
- Production company: Barry Mahon Productions
- Distributed by: Chancellor Films
- Release date: November 17, 1967; (Maryland)
- Running time: 78 minutes
- Country: United States
- Language: English
- Budget: $30,000

Fanny Hill Meets Dr. Erotico is a 1967 science fiction exploitation film produced and directed by Barry Mahon. The film stars Sue Evans and Michael R. Thomas. The film is a sequel to Fanny Hill Meets Lady Chatterly. The film premiered on November 17, 1967.

== Plot ==
After Fanny Hill has spent a year in a London brothel, she decides it is time to return to the castle of Lady Chatterly, who is her former employer. Upon arriving, she discovers the castle has been rented out to a lecherous old doctor, who has been working on bringing to life the man he has created in his laboratory. She is quickly hired back as a servant to the doctor, and devotes her time once again to what she does best; having sexual relations.

One day, she accidentally triggers the electrical switch which brings the Frankenstein monster to life. After coming to life, the first person the monster sees is Fanny, and he falls in love with her. The doctor is angry at Fanny, because his scientific experiment was not yet complete, but he reluctantly keeps her on as his servant, because the monster has now started following her around everywhere. Due to the monster's obsession with her, Fanny must keep the monster in her bedroom.

When another young maid employed at the castle comes into Fanny's bedroom one day, she starts making lesbian advances towards Fanny, which the monster incorrectly interprets as Fanny being in danger of being harmed, and rushes to her rescue. Startled by the monster, the maid starts screaming, and the monster kills her. The monster now starts to panic and he begins running amok through the countryside.

The townspeople are alarmed at the sight of the monster running loose, and they eventually corner him in a barn, which they immediately set on fire, destroying the doctor's work. The doctor is disappointed with Fanny, and sends her away to return to the road once more.

== Background and production ==
Mahon spent $30,000 to make the film. He kept his production costs to a minimum by using his production employees for more than one job. He said that he sometimes worked as a cameraman on his own films. He also stated "we shoot fast", and he did not "waste film"; he claims that a regular producer will shoot ten times as much film as he will use, while his ratio was no more than one and a half to one.

Mahon said he hoped to gross $1,000,000 a year on the Fanny Hill series. (Note: The first film in the Fanny Hill series is Fanny Hill Meets Lady Chatterly, followed by Dr. Erotico, and then Fanny Hill Meets the Red Baron) His plan was to show the movies in as many as 600 theaters in the United States. When asked about the sexual nature of the series, Mahon replied that he "wasn't embarrassed about it, if I thought I was doing something wrong I wouldn't talk about it, people have a right to express themselves as openly as they wish as long as they don't push their expression on others."

== Release ==
The film was released on November 17, 1967, in Maryland. In October 1968, after the film was shown in Boston at the State Theater, the theater was charged, convicted and fined $100 for showing an "allegedly obscene movie." The owners of the theater appealed the conviction to the Massachusetts Supreme Judicial Court, and in 1969, the court upheld the conviction, writing in their opinion that the film "is obscene, it is patently offensive, an affront to contemporary community standards and it is utterly without redeeming social value; indeed, in our opinion, the film has no value."

== Reception ==
Film historian Thomas Leitch says there are several sexploitation films that are built around the character Fanny Hill from the novel, which obviously deviate from the source text. He argues that Hill "came simply to signal sexual licentiousness, the character being relocated in place and time as a symbol of sexual availability in films." He opined that in this film, we see "an erotic mashup with the world of Frankenstein, while Fanny is a servant girl with whom the monster falls in love."

Jim Hoagland wrote in The Montreal Star that the film "finds every conceivable excuse to get the heroine to climb out of her blouse, which mounts up to eight excuses, in scenes that run for a total of about 20 minutes, with the remaining 50 or so minutes being pretty dismal."

In his newspaper column about X-rated movies, Del Ray wrote in the Democrat and Chronicle, that the "doc sort of put the chill on things, what with his bunsen burners and generators and bubble machines and steaming chemicals and valves and buckets of bloods and his homemade monster with blue face and gnarled hands and hemstitched wrists and big, big, BIG feet."

== See also ==
- List of American films of 1967
- List of LGBTQ-related films of 1967
- Nudity in film
