= RiffTrax: The Game =

2022 video game

- Developer: Wide Right Interactive
- Publisher: Wide Right Interactive
- Director: Mark Zorn
- Producer: Peter Hunter
- Designer: Jim Dirschberger
- Programmer: Mark Zorn
- Artists: Bridget Nelson; Michael Nelson; Kevin Murphy; Bill Corbett
- Writers: Michael Nelson; Kevin Murphy; Bill Corbett; Conor Lastowka
- Composer: Kevin Murphy
- Platforms: macOS; Microsoft Windows; Nintendo Switch; PlayStation 4; Xbox One
- Release: May 5, 2022
- Genre: Party
- Mode: Multiplayer

RiffTrax: The Game is a 2022 multiplayer party game developed and published by Wide Right Interactive. A follow-up to Wide Right's What the Dub?, the game is based on and features the cast members of RiffTrax, an online comedy group whose performers make commentary over bad movies and public domain shorts, inspired by the television show Mystery Science Theater 3000.

== Gameplay ==
Gameplay consists of players writing their own lines of dialogue or riffs (jokes) for movie clips from the RiffTrax library; players can also choose from a selection of riffs written and voiced by the Rifftrax team. After the riff is played back (with players' original riffs rendered using text-to-speech), players then choose which riff is the best. Between two and six players can play in a game, each randomly represented by a silhouette of an infamous character from the Rifftrax library such as Torgo, Mr. B Natural, Coily the Spring Sprite, The Guy from Harlem or Ice Cream Bunny, and up to twelve audience members can watch and vote on the riffs per game.

== Release ==
RiffTrax: The Game was released on May 5, 2022, for macOS, Microsoft Windows, Nintendo Switch, PlayStation 4 and Xbox One.

On August 10, 2023, Wide Right Interactive partnered up with Limited Run Games to create physical copies of the game for PlayStation 4 and Nintendo Switch.

== Reception ==
Reception

Aggregate score
| Aggregator | Score |
|---|---|
| Metacritic | (PC) 74/100 (PS4) 79/100 (XONE) 71/100 (NSW) 80/100 |

Review scores
| Publication | Score |
|---|---|
| GameSpot | 7/10 |
| Shacknews | 8/10 |
| VentureBeat | 4.5/5 |

RiffTrax: The Game received "mixed or average" reviews for the Microsoft Windows and Xbox One edition while "generally favorable" reviews were reserved for the PlayStation 4 and Nintendo Switch versions, according to review aggregator website Metacritic.

The Verge and VentureBeat praised the game, the latter stating that they found it addictive. GameSpot and Ars Technica were more neutral. GameSpot noted that it was not as fun to play alone while Ars Technica wrote that it was "As fun and competent as a $10 party game needs to be. If you like MST3K or Rifftrax, then buy."
