= What the Dub? =

2021 video game

What the Dub?!
- Developer: Wide Right Interactive
- Publisher: Wide Right Interactive
- Director: Mark Zorn
- Producer: Jim Dirschberger
- Designer: Kurt Wojda
- Programmer: Mark Zorn
- Writers: Jim Dirschberger; Mark Zorn
- Composer: Jonathan Hylander
- Platforms: macOS; Windows; Nintendo Switch; PlayStation 4; Xbox One
- Release: WW: April 8, 2021
- Genre: Party
- Mode: Multiplayer

What the Dub?! is a 2021 multiplayer party game developed and published by Wide Right Interactive. It was released on April 8, 2021, to positive reviews.

A follow-up, RiffTrax: The Game, based on and featuring cast members from RiffTrax, was released in May 2022.

== Gameplay ==
Gameplay consists of players writing their own lines of dialogue for clips from public domain B movies, PSAs and industrial films. After the line is played back using text-to-speech, the players then choose which line is the best. Between two and six players can play in a game, and up to twelve audience members can watch and vote on the best lines per game.

== Films and shows ==
- Night of the Living Dead (1968)
- Teenagers from Outer Space (1959)
- Cheating (1952)
- The Brain That Wouldn't Die (1962)
- The Terror (1963)
- House on Haunted Hill (1959)
- Scarlett Street (1945)
- The City of the Dead (1960)
- The Little Shop of Horrors (1960)
- McLintock! (1963)
- Young Man's Fancy (1952)
- The Red House (1947)
- The Great Rights (1963)
- Stop Driving Us Crazy (1961)
- Killers From Space (1954)
- A Date with Your Family (1950)
- Horror Express (1972)
- Cosmos: War of the Planets (1977)
- Duck and Cover (1951)
- Dating Do's and Don't's (1949)
- Dressed to Kill (1946)
- Curious Alice (1968)
- Wild Guitar (1962)
- A Word to the Wives (1955)
- Mel-O-Toons
- ABC News

== See also ==
- Mystery Science Theater 3000
- List of films in the public domain
