= The Cool Ones =

1967 film by Gene Nelson

- Directed by: Gene Nelson
- Written by: Joyce Geller; Gene Nelson (adaptation); Robert Kaufman (adaptation)
- Produced by: William Conrad (executive producer); Jimmy Lydon (uncredited)
- Starring: Roddy McDowall; Debbie Watson; Gil Peterson; Phil Harris; Robert Coote; Nita Talbot; George Furth
- Cinematography: Floyd Crosby
- Edited by: James T. Heckert
- Music by: Ernie Freeman
- Distributed by: Warner Bros. Pictures
- Release date: April 12, 1967
- Running time: 95 minutes
- Country: United States

The Cool Ones (also known as Cool, Baby Cool) is a 1967 American film directed by Gene Nelson, starring Roddy McDowall and Debbie Watson. It was written by Joyce Geller from an adaptation by Gene Nelson and Robert Kaufman.

Novelty singer Mrs. Miller performs in a cameo role, and the film features performances by the bands The Leaves and The Bantams as well as a brief appearance by Glen Campbell, playing a fictional singer.

== Plot ==
Hallie Rodgers is a backup singer on the TV show Whizbang. One evening, she boldly steps out of the chorus and begins singing “Just One of Those Things.” The young people in the audience love her singing, but the producer Fred MacElewine fires her.

A little later she goes into a bar, and Cliff Donner, a former singing star, tells Hallie he saw her on television and liked her singing. Tony Krum, a music promoter, suggests Hallie and Cliff sing together, and the duo become popular recording artists. They also fall in love.

== Cast ==
- Roddy McDowall as Tony Krum
- Debbie Watson as Hallie Rodgers
- Gil Peterson as Cliff Donner
- Phil Harris as Fred MacElewine
- Robert Coote as Herbert Krum
- Nita Talbot as Deedee Howitzer
- George Furth as Howie
- Glen Campbell as Patrick
- James Millhollin as Manager
- Ilona Massey as Toni Karpathy (uncredited)

In an uncredited appearance, one of the dancers is Teri Garr, as one of the Whiz-Bam girls.

== Reception ==
The film received mostly negative reviews, and it now is viewed as something of a 1960s cult musical.

Kine Weekly wrote: "Lacking in originality and star value, this film carnot expect to command any wide attention. Solely for the unsophisticated young. ... This film does not even have the advantage of a big name to sell it to pop fans. It has a novelettish plot, directed in routine fashion, and the songs include nothing particularly memorable."

Boxoffice wrote: "Fans of the rock 'n' roll school should respond with enthusiasm to this film ... The film will do its best business among the teenage audience, although adults not repelled by the music offered should also enjoy it. ... Roddy McDowall gives an often hilarious performance as the youngest self-made rock n' role [sic] talent manager in the world, rolling in millions and reveling in neurotic quirks"

Variety wrote: "The Cool Ones is a refreshing entry for the youth market. Loosely-constructed, story-wise, and frequently burdened with confusing continuity and some way-out characters, the William Conrad production still packs the type of ingredients acceptable to the juve crowd who compose much of today's audience. ... Gene Nelson's direction establishes a wild pace ... Action carries few surprises and telegraphs ahead, but it's pleasant enough as entertainment strikes a light note."

The New York Times wrote: "The Cool Ones [is] a rock 'n' roll comedy, so-called, about a pop singer (Debbie Watson) who is on the rise and a big-name crooner (Gil Peterson) who is on the skids. Roddy McDowall is their manager who engineers them into a publicity romance which has – shall we say? – repercussions. I venture to guess this will disgust even the kids."

== See also ==
- List of American films of 1967
