= Rocket Attack U.S.A. =

- Theatrical release poster
- Directed by: Barry Mahon
- Produced by: Barry Mahon; Al Barron; Steve Broidy; Rick Carrier
- Starring: Monica Davis; John McKay; Daniel Kern; Edward Czerniuk; Phillip St. George
- Cinematography: Mike Tabb
- Edited by: Alan Smiler
- Production company: Exploit Films
- Distributed by: Joseph Brenner Associates
- Release dates: March 24, 1960 (New Brunswick, New Jersey)
- Running time: 68 min.
- Country: United States
- Language: English

Rocket Attack U.S.A., also known as Five Minutes to Zero, is a 1958 propaganda espionage/science fiction film produced, directed, and edited by Barry Mahon, who intended to exploit the launching of Sputnik.

== Plot ==
American secret agents, John and Tanya, are sent to the USSR after British agents relay information on a Russian plot to bomb America. The duo discover that the Soviets intend launching an ICBM sneak attack against the United States on the night that they arrive. The Russians are using information gathered by Sputnik to plan the attack, and as the American spies' attempt to sabotage one rocket fails, they are shot. And because of this, the Russians now have the reason for launching the missile: Americans are attempting to stop them.

Back in the United States, as the missile closes in, a radio reporter stays on the air to assist those threatened in the emergency as American defense missiles prove too slow to defend the country. The reporter's wife knows this will be his death sentence. As Manhattan is hit and three million are killed, a general bemoans the lack of a functioning ICBM missile defense system. The efforts to strengthen the US defense system were unsuccessful owing to limited funding and effort. The US retaliation is expected to be minimal as the Russian defenses have been properly funded and maintained. The end title begs the audience not to let this be the end.

== Cast ==
- John McKay as John Manston
- Monica Davis as Tanya / Tannah
- Daniel Kern
- Edward Czerniuk
- Phillip St. George as Gen. Watkins
- Art Metrano as truck driver

== Reception ==
The Albany Herald stated the movie is so melodramatic and with such hilariously bad dialogue that it has developed a cult following, while The Meridian Record-Journal found that it was among the worst movies produced. In Apocalypse Then, the movie was found to be full of cheapness and histrionics, and despite being a sincere attempt, the movie is padded and some of the special effects are literally cartoons. The Encyclopedia of Science Fiction found the movie of interest only as an example of US paranoia over Communism in the 1950s.

== In popular culture ==
It was featured in a 1986 episode of Canned Film Festival as well as a 1990 episode (#205) of Mystery Science Theater 3000, which included the first use of the "stinger."

== Home media ==
It was included as part of the Sci-Fi Invasion 50 movie DVD set released by Mill Creek Entertainment as well as the Mystery Science Theater 3000: Volume 27 DVD set.

== See also ==
- The Lost Missile
