= Gil Peterson =

American actor

Gil Peterson is an American former actor and singer best known for such films and television series as The Cool Ones and The F.B.I..

== Early life and education ==
Peterson was born to H. W. and Mable Peterson in Winona, Mississippi. His older brother, Donald, would later become a NASA astronaut. Peterson played football at both Winona High School and Mississippi State in the position of halfback and left-footed punter, graduating from the university in 1958 as a physical education major. During college vacations, Peterson sang in night clubs in the south, and had a screen test in his senior year. He served for several months with the United States Air Force Reserve.

== Career ==
Peterson moved to Los Angeles, and worked in the physical education department of the school system while pursuing a performing career. Peterson began as a singer with the DownBeats. In 1962, he recorded a single, "Baby, Baby All the Time" with "Nobody's Fool on the B-side, released by the Karle Company, and recorded an album with Bobby Troup, about which Peterson joked, "It sold seven copies. My folks bought six and I bought one." He recorded two other albums which were also not successes.

He performed in summer stock theater and studied acting with James Best. After making a number of commercials, his first television role was on Combat!. Peterson appeared in Never Too Young, Paradise Bay, Run for Your Life, and The Young Marrieds.

In 1966, Peterson was cast as the lead in The Cool Ones. Turner Classic Movies notes that The Cool Ones was not favorably reviewed on its release, but quotes a modern reviewer: "Some bad movies are more entertaining than their much better cousins, and The Cool Ones falls squarely into that category." After The Cool Ones, Peterson was offered a five-year, five-film deal by Jack L. Warner.

Peterson appeared on Death Valley Days in 1967. Other roles included 12 O'Clock High, The F.B.I., and Valley of the Dolls. In 1974, Peterson appeared on Emergency!.

Peterson established JaXon Productions, a film corporation in Mississippi, in 1969, intending to change his career from acting and singing to producing.

By 1989, Peterson had retired from acting and moved to Winchester, Oregon.

== Personal life ==
After first moving to California, Peterson married a model from Sacramento, who died of cancer. Peterson is a licensed flight instructor and owned an aviation business in California.

== Partial filmography ==
- The Brain Machine (1977) as Dr. Elton Morris
- Valley of the Dolls (1967) (uncredited)
- The Cool Ones (1967) as Cliff Donner
