= Barry Mahon =

American film director, producer, and World War II flying ace

- Born: Jackson Barrett Mahon; February 5, 1921; Bakersfield, California
- Died: December 4, 1999 (aged 78); Las Vegas, Nevada
- Other name: T.A. Dee / Barrett Mahon / J. Barrett Mahon / J. Barret Mahon / Jackson B. Mahon / James Michael
- Occupations: Film director, cinematographer, producer
- Years active: 1959–1994
- Spouse: Clelle Mahon (? –1999)

Barry Mahon, born Jackson Barrett Mahon (February 5, 1921 – December 4, 1999) was an American film director, cinematographer and producer.

== Early years ==
Mahon was born in Bakersfield, California and attended the Page Military Academy (now Page Private School) in Los Angeles and graduated from Laguna Blanca Boys School in Santa Barbara, California. He learned to fly while in high school.

== World War II ==
In 1941 he joined the Royal Air Force, and by the winter was flying combat with No. 121 (Eagle) Squadron, composed of American volunteers. Pilot Officer Mahon damaged three German fighters and two Focke-Wulf Fw 190s in April and a Messerschmitt Bf 109 in May, before scoring his first confirmed victories of two Fw 190s, downed in the Saint-Omer area, on June 8, 1942. On July 31 he destroyed two more Fw 190s over the Berck-Sur-Mer area and became an ace while covering the commando raid on Dieppe, August 19, 1942, his 98th fighter pilot mission. At 08:30, flying his Spitfire Vb, nicknamed "Barry", Mahon shot down an Fw 190 and another Fw 190 before his plane was hit and he was forced to bail out of the burning aircraft. Landing in the sea, he was taken prisoner. Although Mahon filed a claim for shooting down two Germans that day, he was only given credit for one after the war. Thus, for a tally-record of five confirmed, two probables and three damaged Mahon received the British Distinguished Flying Cross in 1985.

Mahon was imprisoned at Stalag Luft III and managed to escape, but was captured on the Czechoslovak border. He escaped later, only to be recaptured again, and was finally liberated by Patton's 3rd Army in 1945.

== Post war cinema career ==
After the war he became the personal pilot for, and later the manager of, Errol Flynn. Having produced a number of Flynn and Gina Lollobrigida pictures (including the abortive Story of William Tell), as well as a considerable output of children's programs, Mahon established The Production Machine, a high-tech film production company in Hollywood. He made motion pictures for theatrical and television release. Mahon was the first film producer to adapt and apply computer technology (as well spreadsheet applications, such as MultiPlan) to the breakdown, scheduling, budgeting and financial analysis of feature-length motion pictures and movies-of-the-week for Columbia Pictures.

== Other names ==
T.A. Dee / Barrett Mahon / J. Barrett Mahon / J. Barret Mahon / Jackson B. Mahon / James Michael

== Personal and family life ==
Mahon was married to Clelle until his death. He is the father of Columbia/CBS producer Doris Keating.

== Selected filmography ==
- 1954 – Crossed Swords
- 1959 – Cuban Rebel Girls
- 1961 – Rocket Attack U.S.A.
- 1961 – The Dead One
- 1961 – Pagan Island
- 1964 – Crazy, Wild and Crazy
- 1965 – The Beast That Killed Women
- 1966 – The Love Cult
- 1966 – Prostitutes Protective Society
- 1967 – Fanny Hill Meets Lady Chatterly
- 1967 – Fanny Hill Meets Dr. Erotico
- 1967 – I Was a Man
- 1967 – Run Swinger Run!
- 1967 – Sex Killer
- 1967 – The Adventures of Busty Brown
- 1968 – Fanny Hill Meets the Red Baron
- 1968 – The Warm, Warm Bed
- 1968 – Prowl Girls
- 1969 – The Wonderful Land of Oz
- 1970 – Santa's Christmas Elf (Named Calvin)
- 1970 – Jack and the Beanstalk (attached to R. Winer's Santa and the Ice Cream Bunny in 1972)
- 1970 – Thumbelina (attached to R. Winer's Santa and the Ice Cream Bunny in 1972)
- 1994 – Nudes, Nudists, and Nudism Vol. 2 (1994) (V) (episode "Art School for Nudists") (Mahon's last movie)

== In popular culture ==
Some of his films have been spoofed by Mystery Science Theater 3000 (Rocket Attack U.S.A.) and RiffTrax (Wonderful Land of Oz, both versions of Santa and the Ice Cream Bunny featuring both Thumbelina and Jack and the Beanstalk).
