= Thomas Leitch =

American academic and film scholar (born 1951)

Thomas M. Leitch (born June 23, 1951) is an American academic and film scholar, the author of several authoritative books on film studies and one on Wikipedia.

== Early life ==
Leitch was born in Orange, New Jersey, and educated at Columbia University, where in 1972 he graduated BA magna cum laude in English and Comparative Literature, and then at Yale University, where he became an MA in 1973 and a PhD in 1976.

== Academic career ==
Leitch's first academic post was as assistant professor in the department of English at Yale, from 1976 to 1983. He then had the same position at the department of English, University of Delaware, from 1983 to 1986, when he became an associate professor there. He advanced to professor of English at the University of Delaware in 1991, and remains in post. He has also taught as a Fulbright Lecturer at the Hebrew University of Jerusalem.

His fields of study are American and British literature, cultural studies, film and new media, and public humanities. He “drifted into film studies” in the 1980s and since then has taught undergraduate courses in film and graduate courses in cultural and literary theory.

== Reception ==
Times Higher Education reviewed Leitch's Wikipedia U: Knowledge, Authority and Liberal Education in the Digital Age (2014), noting his view that the assumptions made by Wikipedia's critics about accuracy and authority are themselves open to debate. In the book, Leitch argues that Wikipedia is “an ideal instrument for probing the central assumptions behind liberal education”.

== Personal life ==
Leitch married in 1977 and has two children. He is a Roman Catholic and a Democrat.

== Selected publications ==
- What Stories Are: Narrative Theory and Interpretation (University Park: Penn State University Press, 1986)
- Find the director and Other Hitchcock Games (Athens: University of Georgia Press, 1991)
- Lionel Trilling: An Annotated Bibliography (New York: Garland, 1992)
- The Encyclopedia of Alfred Hitchcock (New York: Facts on File, 2002)
- Crime Films (Cambridge: Cambridge University Press, 2002)
- Perry Mason (Detroit: Wayne State University Press, 2005)
- Film Adaptation and its Discontents: From Gone with the Wind to The Passion of the Christ (Baltimore: Johns Hopkins University Press, 2007)
- A Companion to Alfred Hitchcock, with Leland A. Poague (Wiley-Blackwell, 2011) (ed.)
- Wikipedia U: Knowledge, Authority, and Liberal Education in the Digital Age (Baltimore: Johns Hopkins University Press, 2014)
- Oxford Handbook of Adaptation Studies. (Oxford: Oxford University Press, 2017) (ed.)
- The History of American Literature on Film (Bloomsbury Press, 2019)
