= The Girl with the Hungry Eyes (1967 film) =

1967 film by William Rotsler

- Theatrical release poster
- Directed by: William Rotsler
- Written by: William Rotsler
- Produced by: William Rotsler
- Starring: Adele Rein; Cathy Crowfoot; Pat Barrington; Charlotte Stewart; William Rotsler
- Cinematography: Dwayne Avery
- Edited by: William Rotsler
- Distributed by: Boxoffice International Pictures
- Release date: 1967
- Country: United States
- Language: English

The Girl with the Hungry Eyes is a 1967 American film written and directed by William Rotsler and starring Adele Rein and Cathy Crowfoot. It contains an early film appearance by Charlotte Stewart and a dance scene by Pat Barrington.

== Plot ==
Kitty and Tigercat are two lesbians obsessed with one another.

== Cast ==
- Adele Rein as Kitty (as Vicky Dee)
- Cathy Crowfoot as Tigercat
- Scott Avery as Tom
- Oswald Fenwick as the man
- Pat Barrington as the dancer
- Charlotte Stewart as girl
- William Rotsler as Brian (as Shannon Carse)
