= 2023 deaths in the United States (October–December) =

- Decades: 2000s; 2010s; 2020s; 2030s
- See also: History of the United States (2016–present); Timeline of United States history (2010–present); List of years in the United States

The following notable deaths in the United States occurred in October–December 2023. Names are reported under the date of death, in alphabetical order as set out in WP:NAMESORT. A typical entry reports information in the following sequence: Name, age, country of citizenship at birth and subsequent nationality (if applicable), what subject was noted for, year of birth (if known), and reference.

== October ==
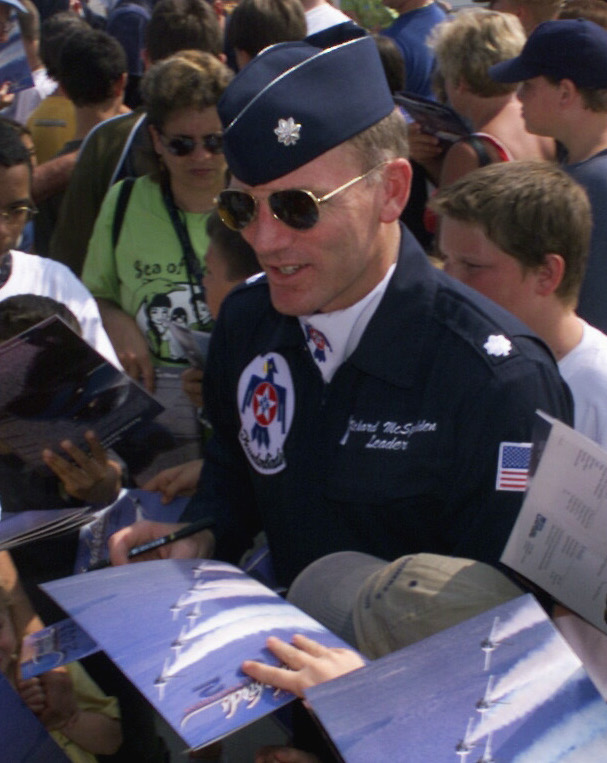
Richard McSpadden

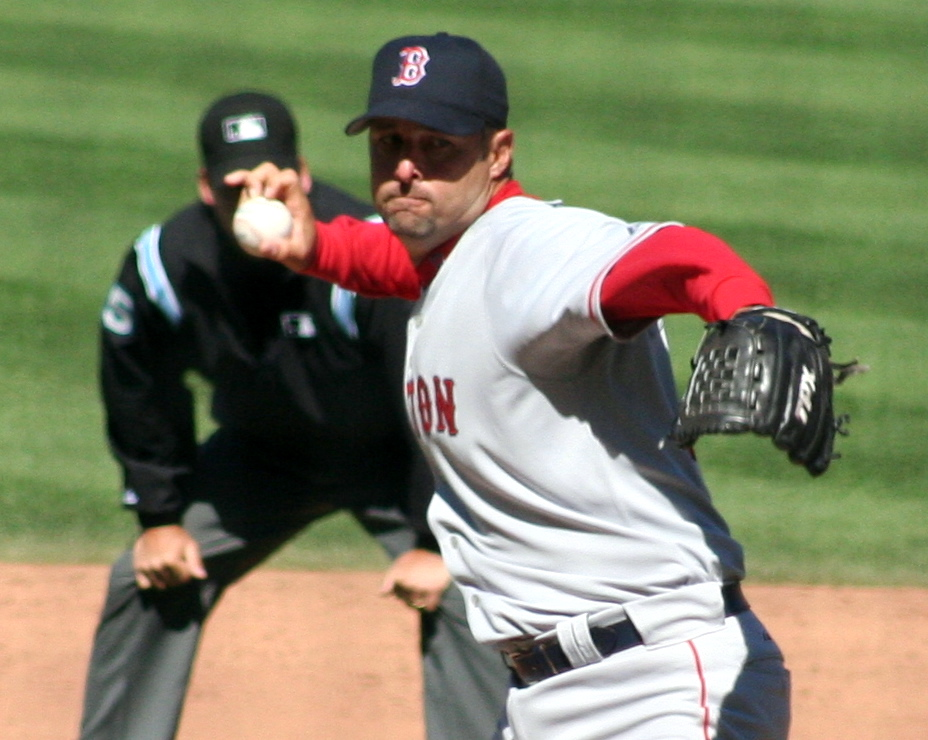
Tim Wakefield

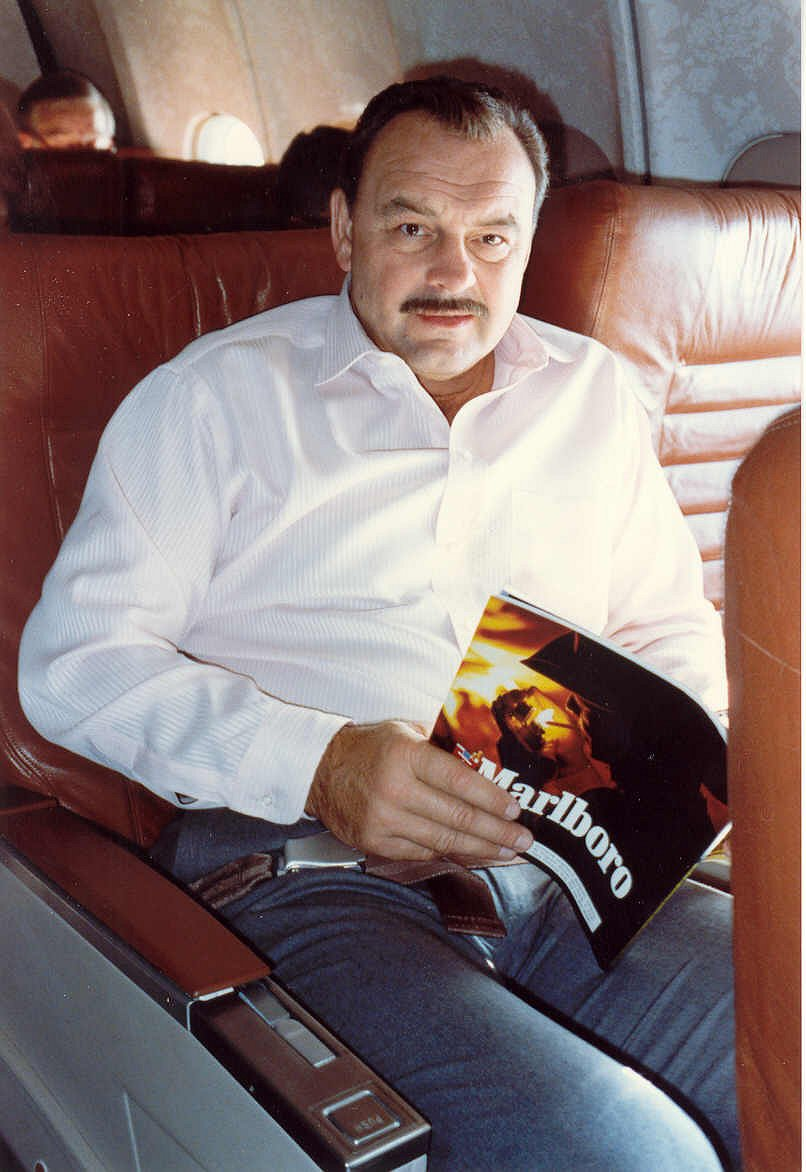
Dick Butkus

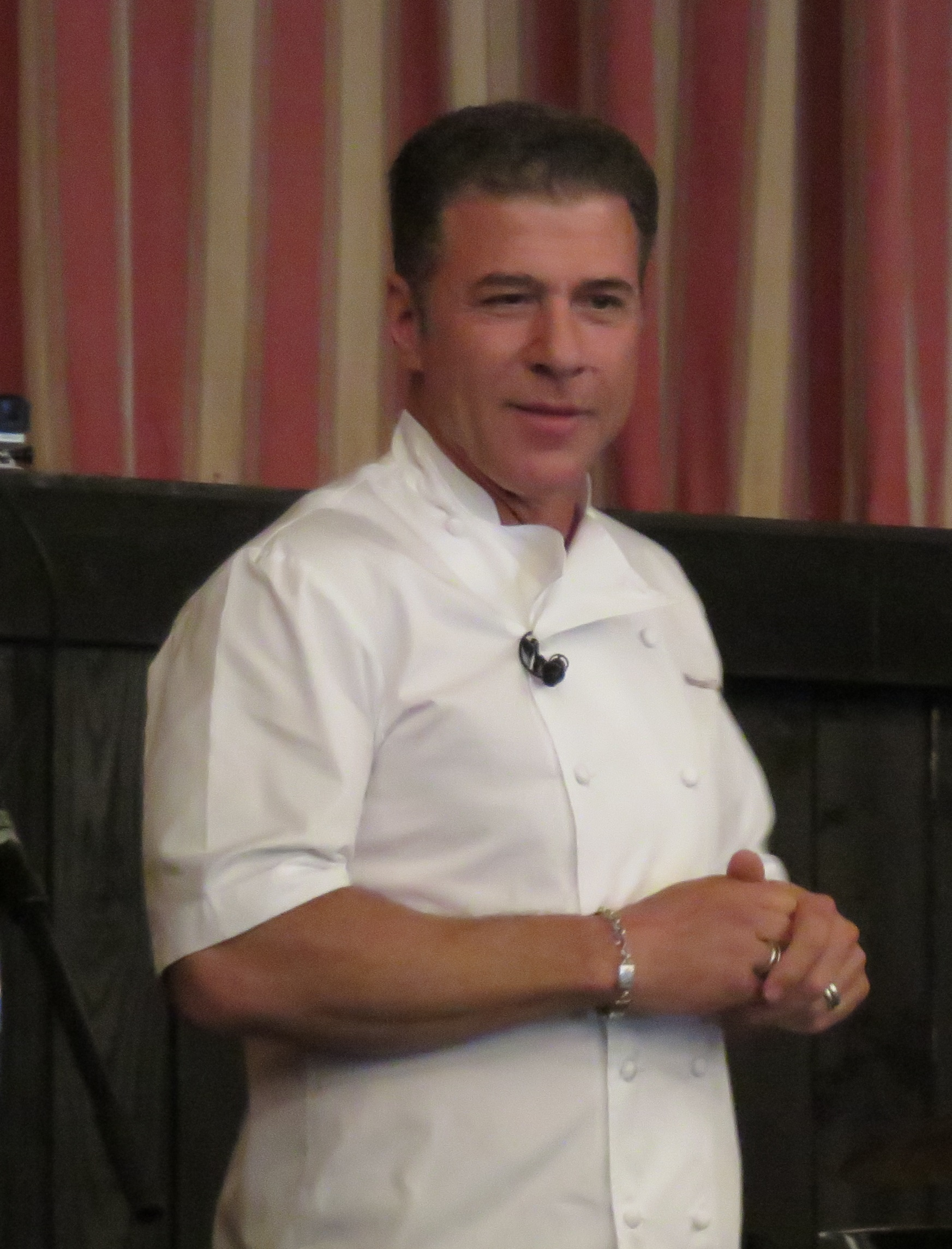
Michael Chiarello

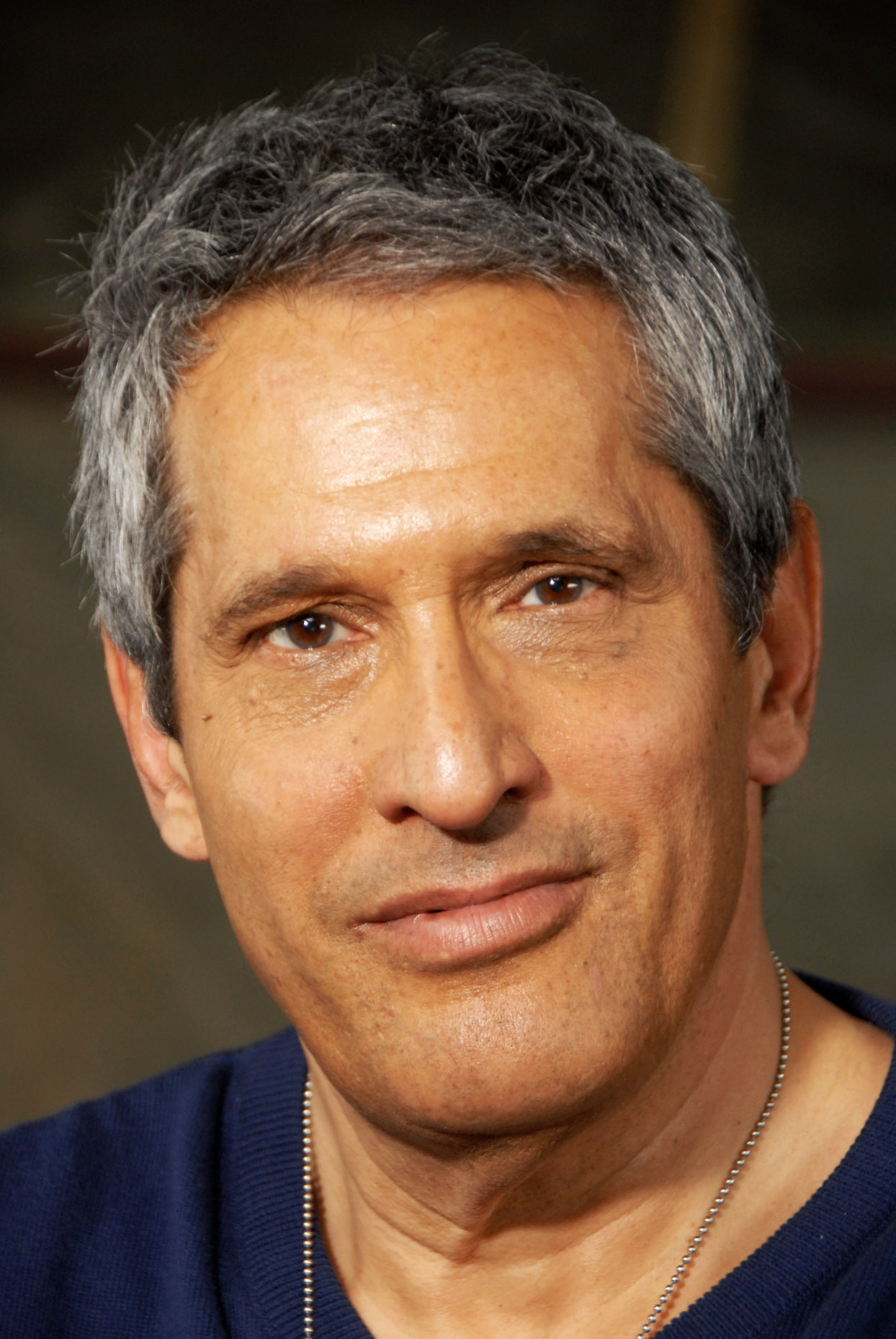
Herschel Savage

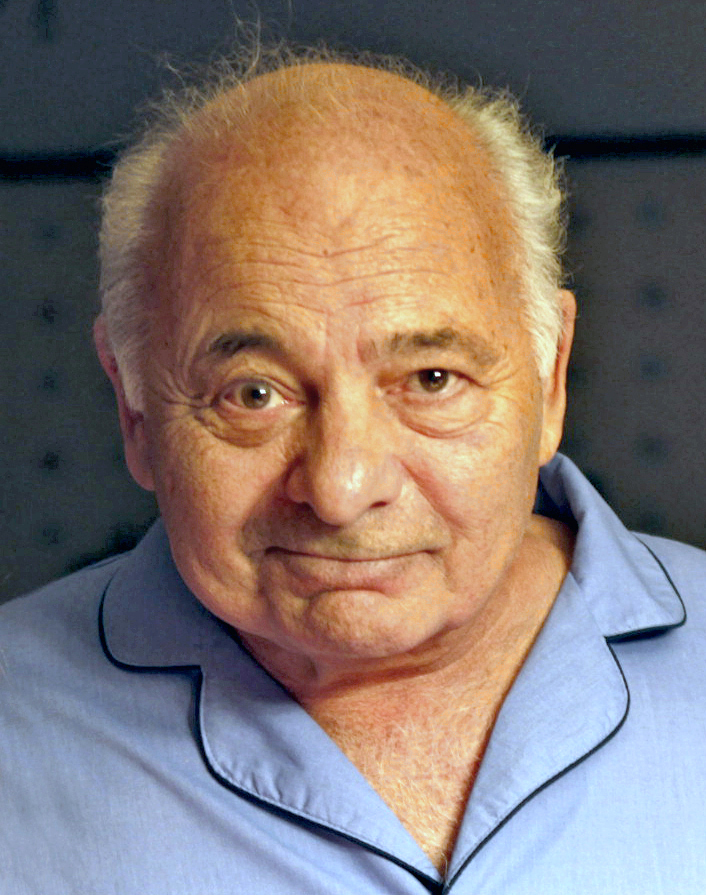
Burt Young

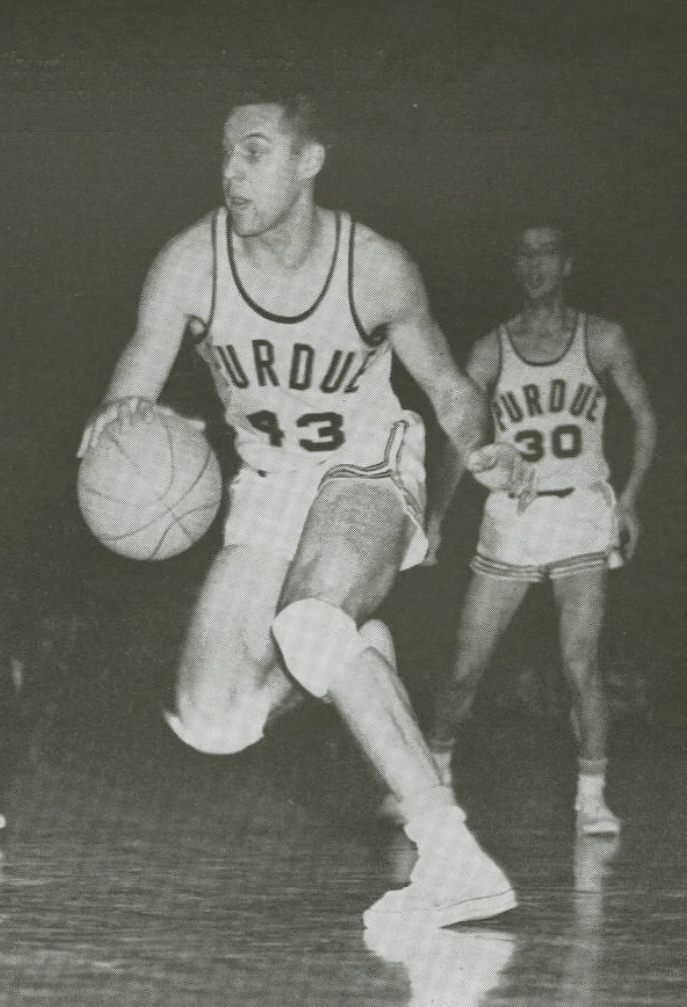
Terry Dischinger

Mark Goddard

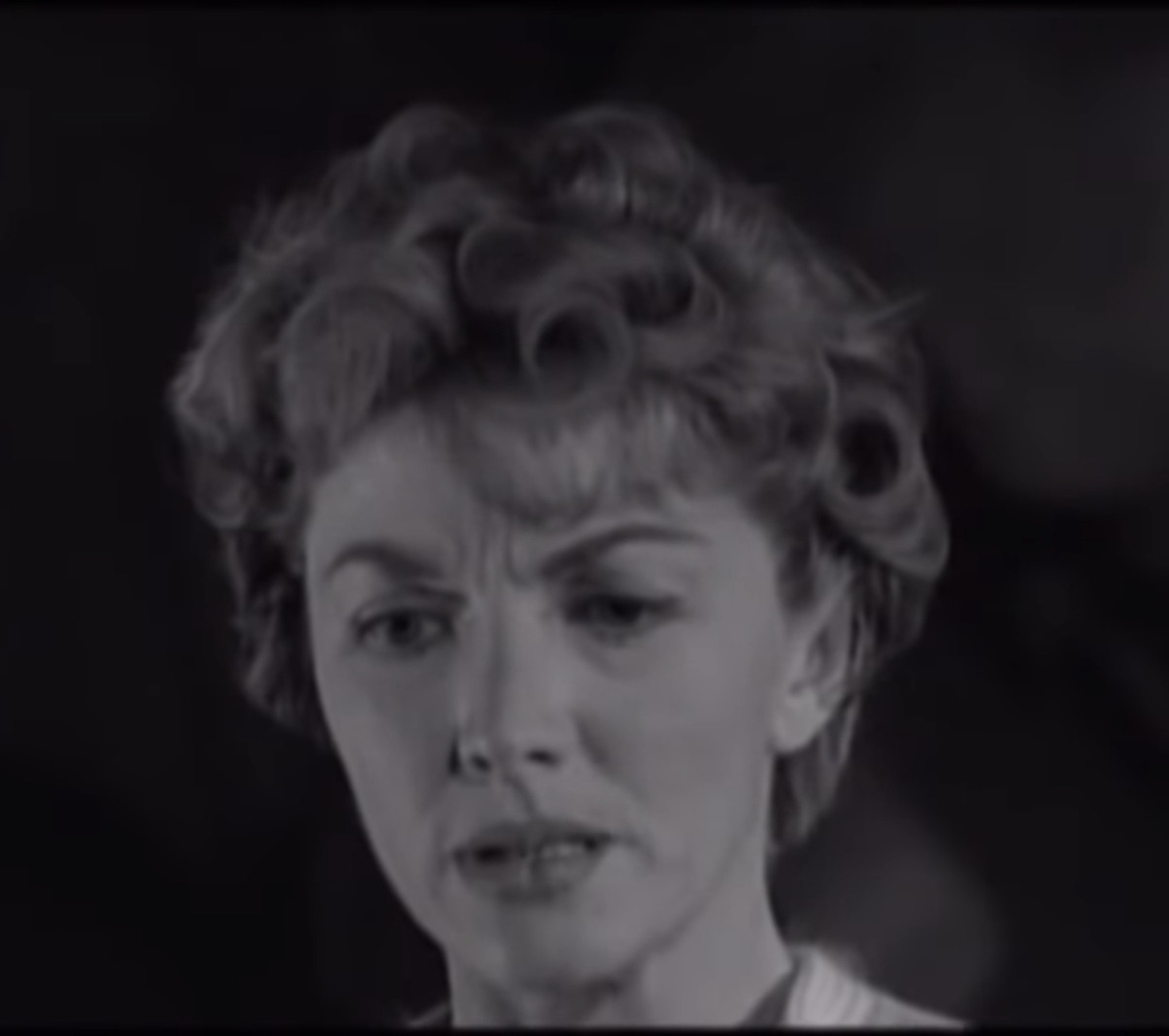
Phyllis Coates

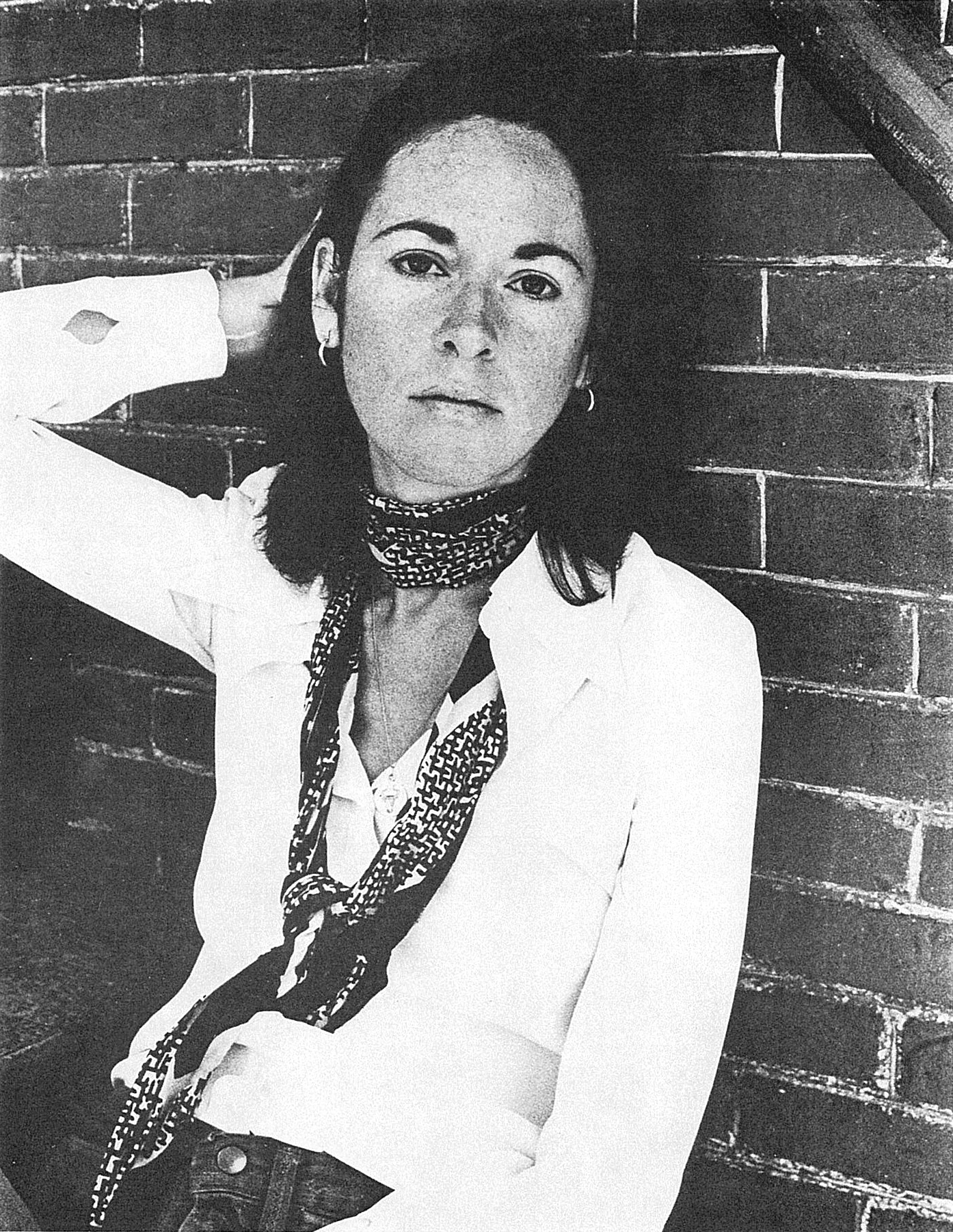
Louise Glück

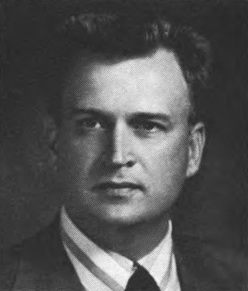
Ronald M. Mottl

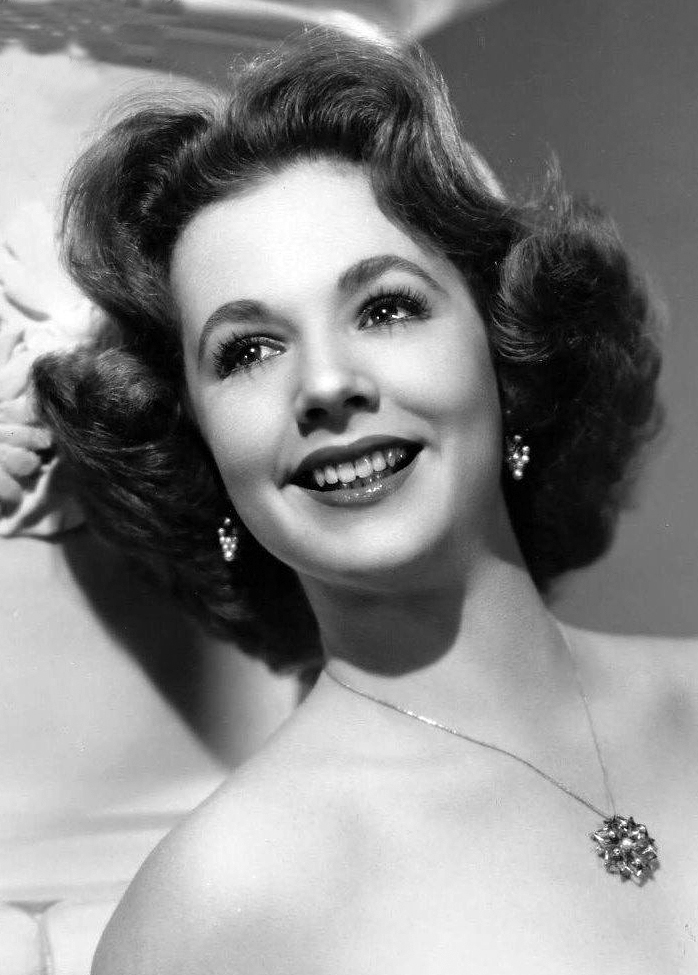
Piper Laurie

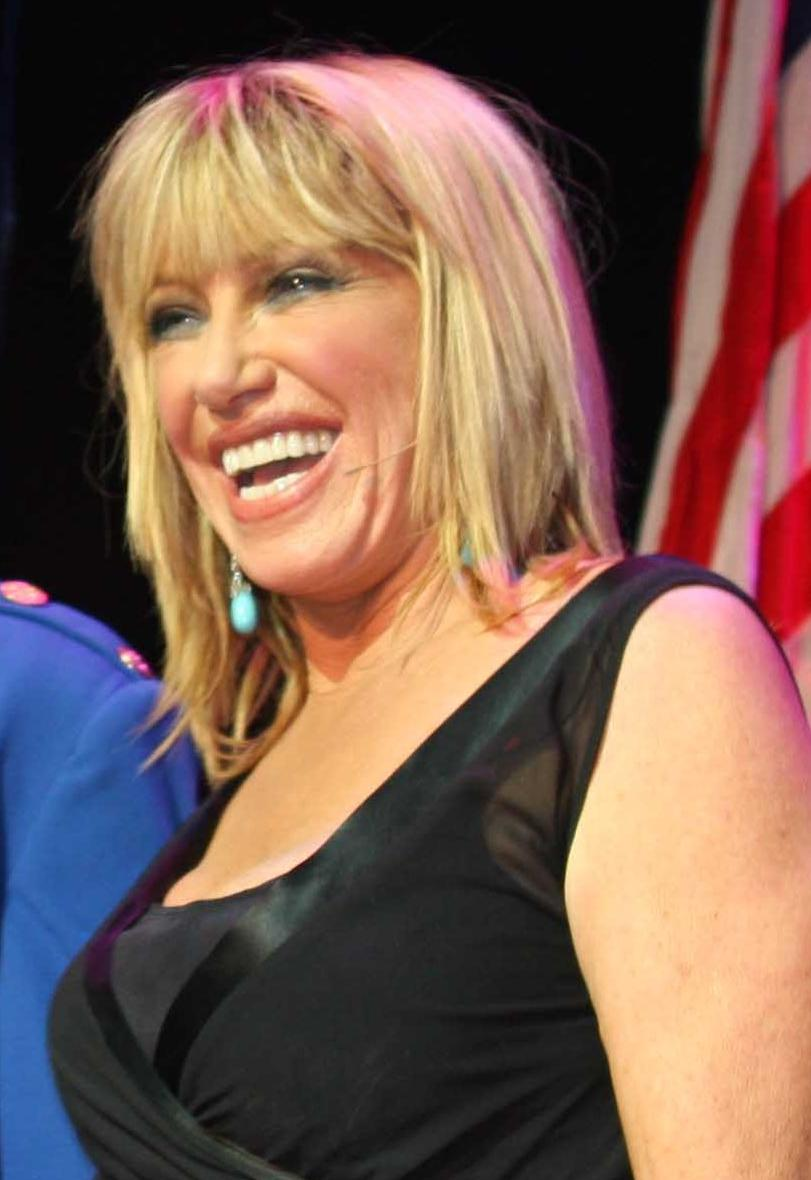
Suzanne Somers

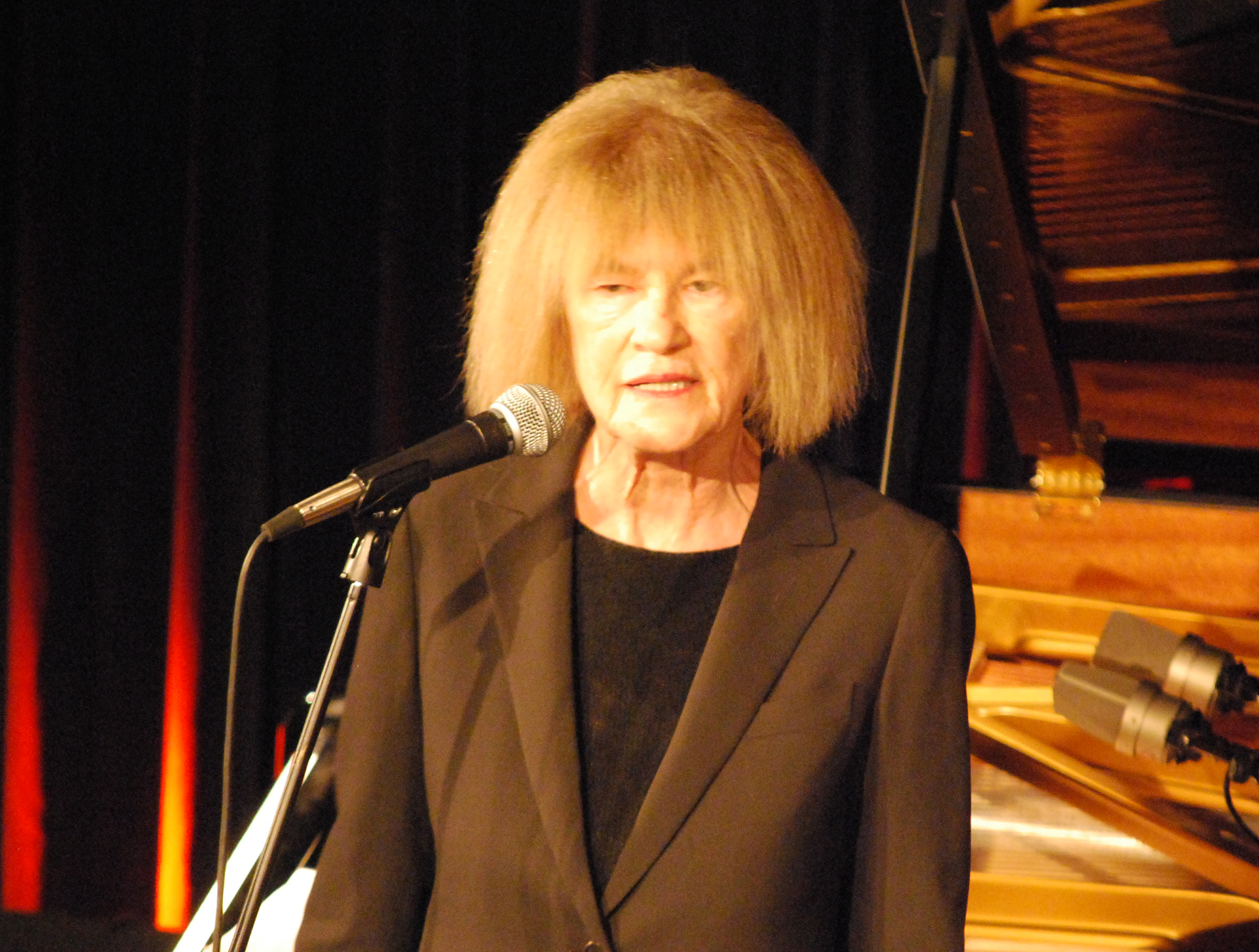
Carla Bley

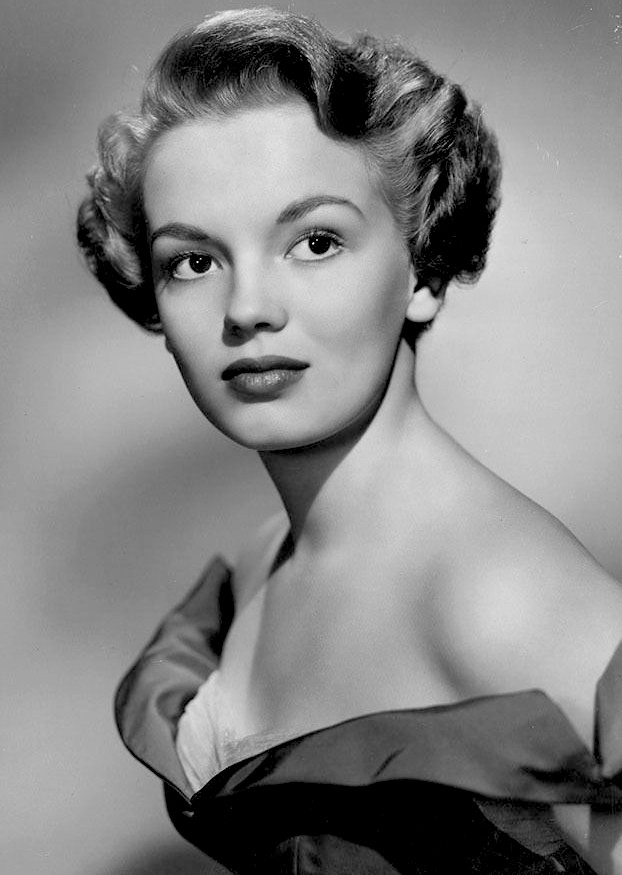
Joan Evans

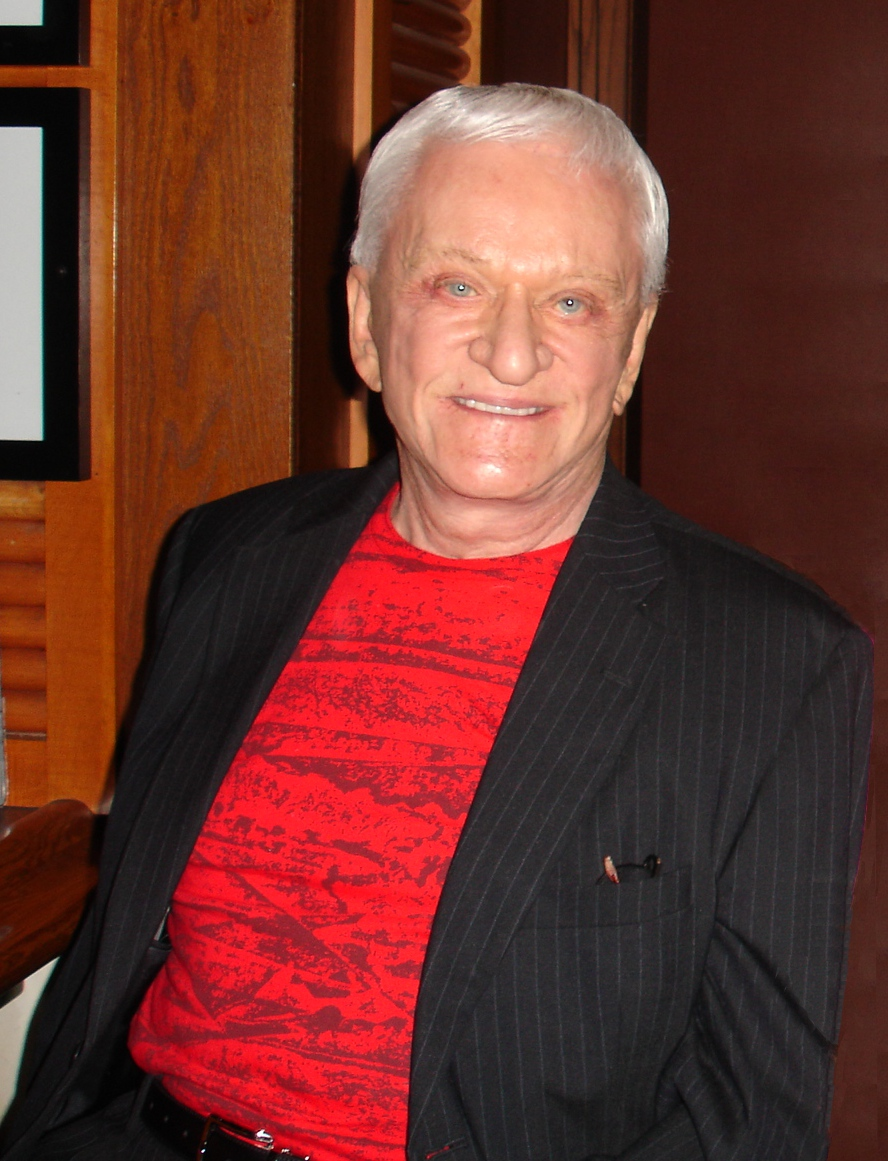
Don Laughlin

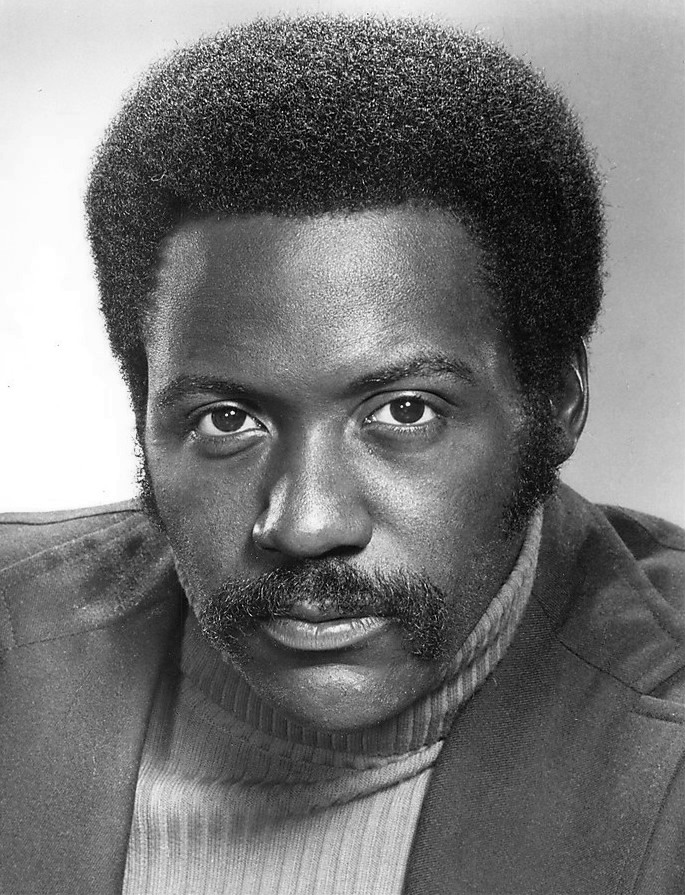
Richard Roundtree

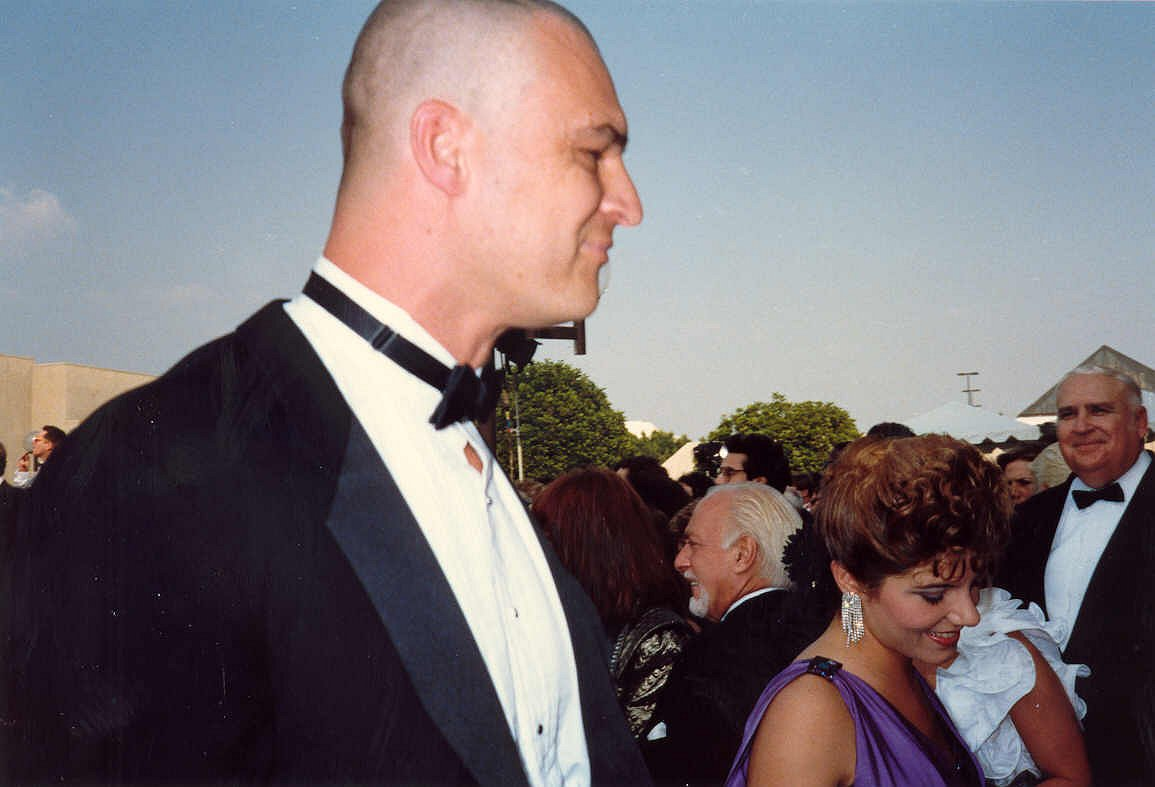
Richard Moll

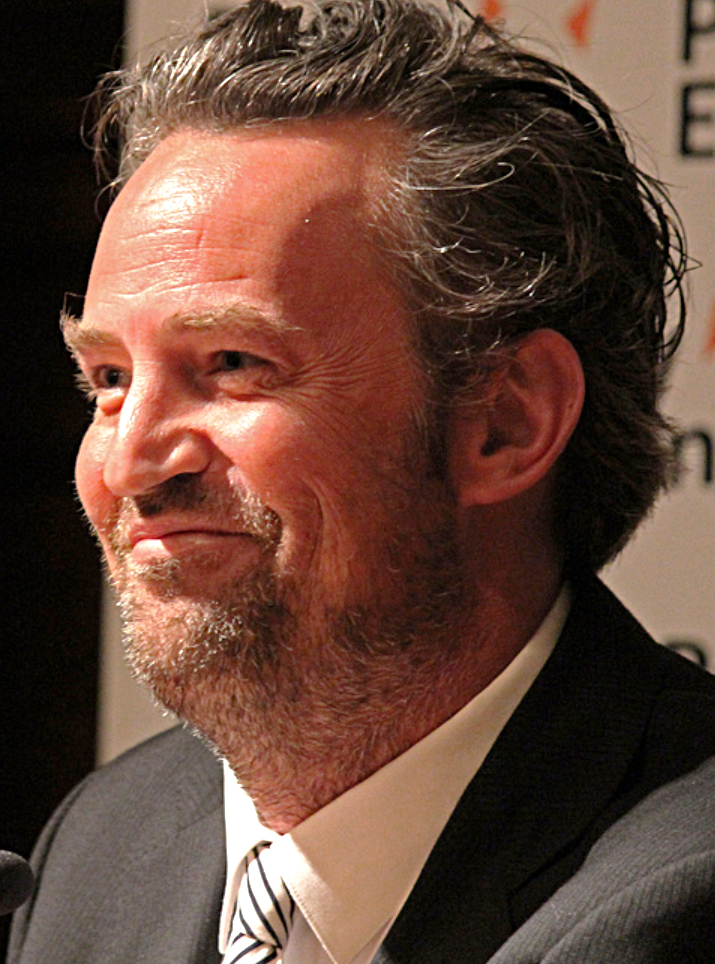
Matthew Perry

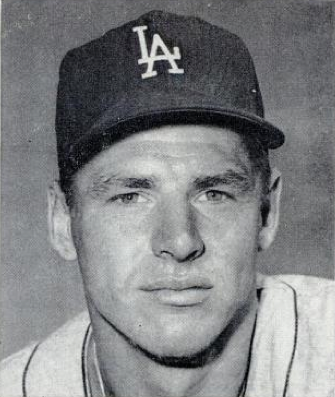
Frank Howard

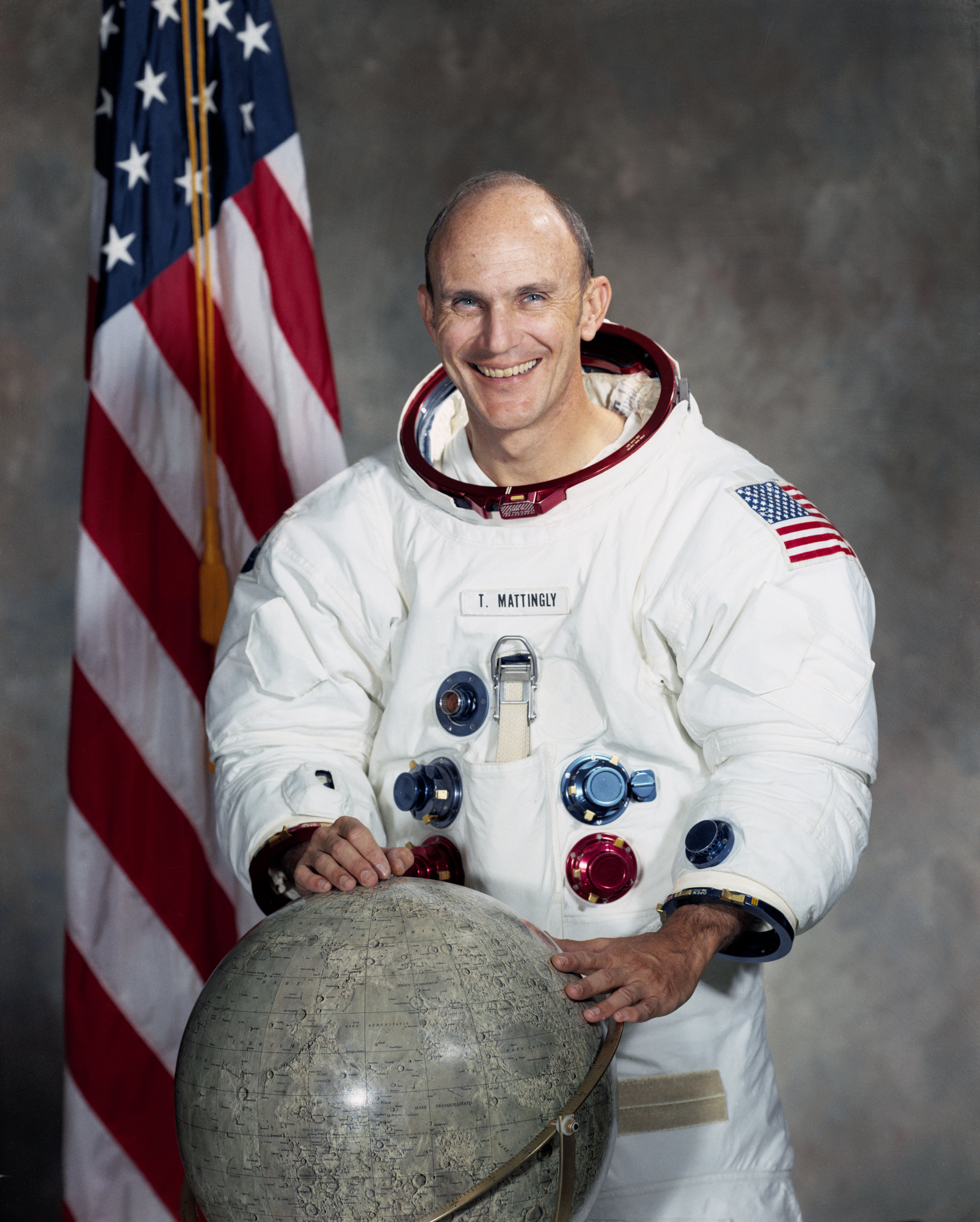
Ken Mattingly

- October 1
  - Eve Bunting, 94, Northern Irish-born author (Smoky Night, The Presence: A Ghost Story) (b. 1928)
  - Jim Caple, 61, sports journalist (ESPN.com) and writer (b. 1962)
  - Russ Francis, 70, football player (New England Patriots, San Francisco 49ers) (b. 1953)
  - Ron Haffkine, 84, record producer and music manager (Dr. Hook & the Medicine Show) (b. 1938)
  - Doug Larsen, 46–47, politician, member of the North Dakota Senate (since 2020) (b. 1976)
  - Richard J. Lesniak, 84, politician, member of the Indiana House of Representatives (1968–1972) (b. 1939)
  - Sir Christopher Lewinton, 91, British-born businessman (b. 1932)
  - Richard McSpadden, 63, educator and pilot (b. 1959/1960)
  - George Reed, 83, football player (Saskatchewan Roughriders) (b. 1939)
  - Tim Wakefield, 57, baseball player (Boston Red Sox, Pittsburgh Pirates) and commentator (NESN) (b. 1966)
  - Claudius E. Watts III, 87, Air Force general, president of The Citadel (1989–1996) (b. 1936)
  - Beverly Willis, 95, architect (b. 1928)
- October 2
  - Kevin M. Birmingham, 51, Roman Catholic prelate, auxiliary bishop of Chicago (since 2020) (b. 1971)
  - Mack C. Chase, 92, businessman (b. 1931)
  - Casey Cox, 81, baseball player (Washington Senators/Texas Rangers, New York Yankees) (b. 1941)
  - Herbert Handt, 97, operatic tenor and conductor (b. 1926)
  - James Jorden, 69, journalist and music critic (Parterre Box) (b. 1954) (body found on this date)
  - Josh Kruger, 39, journalist and activist (b. 1984)
  - David H. Montplaisir, 87, politician, member of the North Dakota House of Representatives (1965–1966) (b. 1936)
  - Hampton Smith, 89, football coach (Albany State Golden Rams) (b. 1934)
- October 3
  - Joe Christopher, 87, baseball player (Pittsburgh Pirates, New York Mets, Boston Red Sox) (b. 1935)
  - Jennie M. Forehand, 87, politician, member of the Maryland Senate (1995–2015) and House of Delegates (1978–1994) (b. 1935)
  - Thomas Gambino, 94, mobster (Gambino crime family) (b. 1929)
  - Lena McLin, 95, music teacher, composer and pastor (b. 1928)
  - Howard Murphy, 79, football coach (Westfield State) (b. 1944)
  - Harriet Pattison, 94, landscape architect (b. 1928)
  - Bob Wagner, 76, football coach (Hawaii Rainbow Warriors) (b. 1947)
- October 4
  - Wayne Comer, 79, baseball player (Detroit Tigers, Milwaukee Brewers, Washington Senators) (b. 1944)
  - Pat Hays, 76, politician, mayor of North Little Rock, Arkansas (1989–2013) and member of the Arkansas House of Representatives (1987–1989) (b. 1947)
  - Rives McBee, 84, golfer (b. 1938)
  - Boris M. Schein, 85, Russian-born mathematician (b. 1938)
  - Shawna Trpcic, 56, costume designer (Mighty Morphin Power Rangers, Angel, Ahsoka) (b. 1966)
  - George Tyndall, 74, gynecologist (b. 1948/1949)
- October 5
  - Dick Butkus, 80, Hall of Fame football player (Chicago Bears) and actor (Hang Time, Johnny Dangerously) (b. 1942)
  - Keith Jefferson, 53, actor (Django Unchained, The Hateful Eight, Once Upon a Time in Hollywood) (b. 1970)
  - Jordan Levy, 79, radio host (WTAG) and politician, mayor of Worcester, Massachusetts (1980–1981, 1988–1993) (b. 1943)
- October 6
  - Michael Chiarello, 61, celebrity chef (Top Chef, Top Chef Masters, The Next Iron Chef) (b. 1962)
  - Loren Cunningham, 88, missionary leader (Youth with a Mission), co-founder of the University of the Nations (b. 1935)
  - Vincent Patrick, 88, author and screenwriter (The Pope of Greenwich Village, Family Business, The Devil's Own) (b. 1935)
  - Jim Poole, 57, baseball player (Baltimore Orioles, Cleveland Indians, San Francisco Giants) (b. 1966)
- October 7
  - Sy Becker, 87, reporter and movie critic (WWLP, WSPR) (b. 1936) (death announced on this date)
  - Patricia Cray, 82, actress (Wonder Boys, The Kill Point, Love and Other Drugs) (b. 1941)
  - Eric Griffin, 55, Olympic boxer (1992) (b. 1967)
  - Anna Gutu, 31–32, Ukrainian-born mountaineer (b. 1990/1991)
  - Brian Iwata, 75, psychologist (b. 1948)
  - Loyal Jones, 95, folklorist (b. 1928)
  - Gina Marie Rzucidlo, 45, mountaineer (b. 1978)
  - Ted Schwinden, 98, politician, governor (1981–1989) and lieutenant governor (1977–1981) of Montana, member of the Montana House of Representatives (1959–1963) (b. 1925)
- October 8
  - Fred Boyd, 73, basketball player (Philadelphia 76ers, New Orleans Jazz) (b. 1950)
  - David Dollar, 68, economist (b. 1954)
  - Bret Gilliam, 72, technical diver (b. 1951)
  - James P. Kauahikaua, 72, geophysicist and volcanologist and first Native Hawaiian scientist-in-charge of the Hawaiian Volcano Observatory (b. 1951)
  - Jeff Peterek, 60, baseball player (Milwaukee Brewers) (b. 1963)
  - Herschel Savage, 70, pornographic actor (Debbie Does Dallas, Memphis Cathouse Blues, The Texas Vibrator Massacre) and director (b. 1952)
  - Burt Young, 83, actor (Rocky, Chinatown, The Pope of Greenwich Village) (b. 1940)
- October 9
  - Greg Butcher, 71, politician, member of the West Virginia House of Delegates (b. 1952)
  - Terry Dischinger, 82, basketball player (Chicago Zephyrs, Detroit Pistons, Portland Trail Blazers), Olympic champion (1960) (b. 1940)
  - Chuck Feeney, 92, travel retailer and philanthropist, founder of DFS Group and Atlantic Philanthropies (b. 1931)
  - Keith Giffen, 70, comic book artist and writer (Legion of Super-Heroes, Justice League), co-creator of Rocket Raccoon (b. 1952)
  - Steven Lutvak, 64, composer and singer-songwriter (A Gentleman's Guide to Love and Murder) (b. 1959)
  - Kevin Phillips, 82, political commentator (NOW on PBS) (b. 1940)
  - Dick Rauh, 98, graphic artist and visual effects artist (Little Shop of Horrors, Star Trek V: The Final Frontier, Working Girl) (b. 1925)
  - Buck Trent, 85, country musician and television personality (Hee Haw) (b. 1938)
  - Allan Weisbecker, 75, surfer, novelist, and screenwriter (Crime Story) (b. 1948) (death announced on this date)
- October 10
  - Roger Bedford Jr., 67, politician, member of the Alabama Senate (1982–1990, 1994–2014) (b. 1956)
  - Jeff Burr, 60, film director (Leatherface: The Texas Chainsaw Massacre III, Stepfather II, Puppet Master 4) (b. 1963)
  - Shirley Jo Finney, 74, actress (Nashville Girl, Echo Park, Moving) and stage director (b. 1949)
  - Mark Goddard, 87, actor (Lost in Space, Blue Sunshine, Roller Boogie) (b. 1936)
  - Martin Goetz, 93, software engineer (b. 1930)
  - John Klenke, 65, politician, member of the Wisconsin State Assembly (2011–2015) (b. 1958)
  - Eva Kollisch, 98, Austrian-born lesbian rights activist and writer (b. 1925)
  - Ken Lally, 52, actor (Heroes, Mortal Kombat, Red Dead Redemption) and stuntman (b. 1971)
  - Dick Leach, 83, tennis player and coach (b. 1940)
  - Brendan Malone, 81, basketball coach (Rhode Island Rams, Toronto Raptors) (b. 1942)
  - Louise Meriwether, 100, author (Daddy Was a Number Runner) and activist (b. 1923)
  - Gail O'Neill, 61, model and journalist (The Early Show) (b. 1962)
- October 11
  - Doug Clark, 75, serial killer (b. 1948)
  - Phyllis Coates, 96, actress (Superman and the Mole Men, Adventures of Superman, The Incredible Petrified World) (b. 1927)
  - Walt Garrison, 79, football player (Dallas Cowboys) (b. 1944)
  - Rudolph Isley, 84, singer-songwriter (The Isley Brothers) and songwriter ("It's Your Thing", "That Lady") (b. 1939)
  - Jim Jensen, 89, politician, member of Nebraska Legislature (1994–2006) and contractor (b. 1934)
  - Rosemarie Myrdal, 94, politician, lieutenant governor of North Dakota (1992–2000) (b. 1929)
  - Cynthia Whittaker, 82, academic and author (b. 1941)
- October 12
  - Robert von Dassanowsky, 58, Austrian-born writer, historian, and film producer (b. 1965) (death announced on this date)
  - Howard Forman, 77, politician, member of the Florida Senate (1989–2000) (b. 1946)
  - Tom O'Lincoln, 76, Marxist historian and author (b. 1947)
  - Lara Parker, 84, actress (Dark Shadows, Save the Tiger, Race with the Devil) (b. 1938)
  - Colette Rossant, 91, French-born restaurateur (b. 1932)
- October 13
  - Michael J. Bragman, 83, politician, member (1981–2001) and majority leader (1993–2000) of the New York State Assembly (b. 1940)
  - Louise Glück, 80, poet (The Triumph of Achilles, The Wild Iris), Pulitzer Prize winner (1993), Nobel Prize laureate (2020) (b. 1943)
  - Burdette Haldorson, 89, basketball player, Olympic champion (1956, 1960) (b. 1934)
  - Frank A. Herda, 76, army soldier, Medal of Honor recipient (b. 1947)
  - Ronald M. Mottl, 89, lawyer and politician, member of the U.S. House of Representatives (1975–1983), Ohio House of Representatives (1987–1997) and twice of Ohio Senate (b. 1934)
  - Loren Parks, 97, businessman (b. 1926)
  - Bud Somerville, 86, curler (b. 1937)
  - Lois Wright, 95, artist (b. 1928)
- October 14
  - Wadea Al-Fayoume, 6, Palestinian-born child (b. 2017)
  - Andy Bean, 70, professional golfer (b. 1953)
  - Maurice W. Long, 98, electrical engineer and physicist (b. 1925)
  - Piper Laurie, 91, actress (The Hustler, Children of a Lesser God, Twin Peaks), Emmy winner (1987) (b. 1932)
  - Mei Tsu-lin, 90, Chinese-born linguist, member of Academia Sinica (b. 1933)
- October 15
  - Dick Bielski, 91, football player (Philadelphia Eagles, Dallas Cowboys) and coach (Baltimore Colts) (b. 1932)
  - Neal Brooks Biggers Jr., 88, jurist, judge of the U.S. District Court for Southern Mississippi (since 1984) (b. 1935)
  - Tod Brown, 86, Roman Catholic prelate, bishop of Boise City (1988–1998) and Orange in California (1998–2012) (b. 1936)
  - Joanna Merlin, 92, actress (Fame, Mystic Pizza, Law & Order: Special Victims Unit) and casting director (b. 1931)
  - Todd Reynolds, 56, Olympic pair skater (1994) (b. 1966)
  - David Shaffer, 87, South African-born physician and pediatrician (b. 1936)
  - Suzanne Somers, 76, actress (Three's Company, Step by Step, She's the Sheriff) (b. 1946)
- October 16
  - Roland R. Griffiths, 77, psychopharmacologist (b. 1946)
  - Geri M. Joseph, 100, diplomat, ambassador to the Netherlands (1978–1981) (b. 1923)
  - Steven Weisberg, 68, film editor (Harry Potter and the Prisoner of Azkaban, Men in Black II, The Cable Guy, Great Expectations) (b. 1955)
- October 17
  - Carol Berman, 100, politician, member of the New York Senate (1979–1984) (b. 1923)
  - Edward Bleier, 94, television executive (b. 1929)
  - Carla Bley, 87, jazz composer and pianist (b. 1936)
  - Bob George, 51, film producer, (Endings, Beginnings) (b. 1971)
  - Tom Rychlec, 89, football player (Buffalo Bills, Detroit Lions, Denver Broncos) (b. 1934)
- October 18
  - Roger Brown, 73, basketball player (Detroit Pistons, Denver Nuggets, Carolina Cougars) (b. 1950)
  - Dave Puddington, 95, football coach (Washington University Bears) (b. 1928)
  - Dwight Twilley, 72, singer-songwriter ("I'm on Fire") (b. 1951)
- October 19
  - The 45 King, 62, record producer and DJ (b. 1961)
  - Judy Balaban, 91, actress and author (b. 1932)
- October 20
  - Jack Anderson, 88, poet and dance critic (b. 1935)
  - Jack Brennan, 86, political aide (b. 1937)
  - Pete Ladd, 67, baseball player (Houston Astros, Milwaukee Brewers, Seattle Mariners) (b. 1956)
  - Richard M. Osgood Jr., 79, physicist (b. 1943)
- October 21
  - Vincent Asaro, 86, mobster (Bonanno crime family) (b. 1937)
  - Natalie Zemon Davis, 94, historian (b. 1928)
  - Joan Evans, 89, actress (Edge of Doom, On the Loose, Skirts Ahoy!) (b. 1934)
  - Rob Gardner, 78, baseball player (New York Mets, New York Yankees, Oakland Athletics) (b. 1944)
  - Stephen Kandel, 96, television writer (Iron Horse, MacGyver) (b. 1927)
  - Cindy Montañez, 49, politician, member of the California State Assembly (2002–2006) and mayor of San Fernando (2001–2002) (b. 1974)
  - Betsy Rawls, 95, golfer (b. 1928)
  - Dusty Street, 77, radio disc jockey (KROQ, SiriusXM) (b. 1945/1946)
  - Samantha Woll, 40, synagogue leader, president of Isaac Agree Downtown Synagogue (b. 1983)
- October 22
  - Ida Applebroog, 93, multimedia artist (b. 1929)
  - Jeffrey A. Bader, 78, diplomat, ambassador to Namibia (1999–2001) (b. 1945)
  - Lee Eliot Berk, 81, academic, president of Berklee College of Music (1979–2004) (b. 1942)
  - Tasha Butts, 41, basketball player (Minnesota Lynx) and coach (Georgetown Hoyas) (b. 1982)
  - Vic Fischer, 99, German-born politician, member of the Alaska Senate (1981–1987).
  - Don Laughlin, 92, gambling entrepreneur (b. 1931)
  - Anita Summers, 98, educator (b. 1925)
  - Gregg Sutton, 74, musician (Lone Justice) and songwriter ("Stop!", "Breathe") (b. 1948/1949)
  - Charles E. Young, 91, academic administrator, president of University of Florida (1999–2003) and chancellor of UCLA (1968–1997) (b. 1931)
- October 23
  - J. Frederick Motz, 80, jurist, U.S. attorney for the district of Maryland (1981–1985), judge (since 1985) and chief judge (1994–2001) of the U.S. District Court for the District of Maryland (b. 1942)
  - Harry Porterfield, 95, newscaster (WBBM-TV, WLS-TV) (b. 1928)
  - Betty Price, 92, music teacher, art director and ambassador (b. 1931)
  - Mervin Shiner, 102, country singer-songwriter and guitarist (b. 1921)
  - Tom Walker, 74, baseball player (Montreal Expos, Detroit Tigers, St. Louis Cardinals) (b. 1948)
- October 24
  - Arnold Díaz, 74, journalist (WPIX, WCBS-TV) (b. 1949)
  - Steve Riley, 67, drummer (Keel, L.A. Guns, W.A.S.P.) (b. 1956)
  - Richard Roundtree, 81, actor (Shaft, Se7en, Speed Racer) (b. 1942)
- October 25
  - Bertie Bowman, 92, congressional staffer (b. 1931)
  - Steve Erwin, 63, comics artist (Checkmate, Gunfire) (b. 1960)
  - Robert Irwin, 95, installation artist (Getty Center) (b. 1928)
  - David V. Mitchell, 79, newspaper editor (Point Reyes Light) (b. 1943)
  - Byron Wien, 90, business investor (b. 1933)
- October 26
  - Ray Brown, 74, football player (Atlanta Falcons, New Orleans Saints) (b. 1949)
  - Goa Gil, 72, musician, DJ, and remixer (b. 1951)
  - Phillip Isenberg, 84, politician, mayor of Sacramento (1975–1982) and member of the California State Assembly (1982–1996) (b. 1939)
  - Richard Moll, 80, actor (Night Court, Batman: The Animated Series, Mighty Max) (b. 1943)
  - Harvey Munford, 83, politician, member of the Nevada Assembly (2004–2016) (b. 1940)
  - Judy Nugent, 83, actress (The Ruggles, Magnificent Obsession, There's Always Tomorrow) (b. 1940)
  - Bingo Smith, 77, basketball player (Tulsa Golden Hurricane, Cleveland Cavaliers) (b. 1946)
- October 27
  - Curtis LeRoy Hansen, 90, jurist, judge of the U.S. District Court for the District of New Mexico (since 1992) (b. 1933)
  - William F. May, 96, ethicist (b. 1927)
  - Brandon Smith, 71, actor (Jeepers Creepers, Bernie, From Dusk till Dawn: The Series) (b. 1952)
- October 28
  - Adam Johnson, 29, ice hockey player (Pittsburgh Penguins) (b. 1994)
  - Roland Lajoie, 87, major general (b. 1936)
  - Patricia Mahan, 71, politician, mayor of Santa Clara (2002–2014) (b. 1952)
  - Bill Rice, 84, country music singer and songwriter (b. 1939)
  - Matthew Perry, 54, actor (Friends, The Whole Nine Yards, Fallout: New Vegas) (b. 1969)
  - Dean Weese, 88, Hall of Fame basketball coach (Wayland Baptist Flying Queens) (b. 1935)
- October 29
  - Robert Brustein, 96, theater critic (New Republic), playwright, and political commentator (HuffPost) (b. 1927)
  - Reed McNeil Izatt, 97, chemist (b. 1926)
  - Thierry Rautureau, 64, French-born celebrity chef (b. 1959)
- October 30
  - Sam Ball, 79, football player (Baltimore Colts) (b. 1944)
  - Peter S. Fischer, 88, television writer (Murder, She Wrote, Columbo, Ellery Queen) (b. 1935)
  - Frank Howard, 87, baseball player (Los Angeles Dodgers, Washington Senators/Texas Rangers, Detroit Tigers) and coach (Milwaukee Brewers, New York Mets) (b. 1936)
  - Tim Parenton, 61, college baseball coach (Samford Bulldogs, North Florida Ospreys) (b. 1961)
  - Lois Galgay Reckitt, 78, politician, member of the Maine House of Representatives (since 2016) (b. 1944)
- October 31
  - Tyler Christopher, 50, actor (General Hospital, Days of Our Lives, The Lying Game) (b. 1972)
  - Lawrence Cohn, 91, lawyer, record company executive, and blues record collector (b. 1932)
  - Ken Mattingly, 87, astronaut (Apollo 16) (b. 1936)
  - George W. Owings III, 78, politician, member of the Maryland House of Delegates (1988–2004) (b. 1945)
  - Taraja Ramsess, 41, stuntman (Black Panther, Avengers: Endgame, The Suicide Squad) (b. 1982)
  - Mel Sembler, 93, diplomat, ambassador to Italy (2001–2005) and Australia (1989–1993) (b. 1930)

== November ==
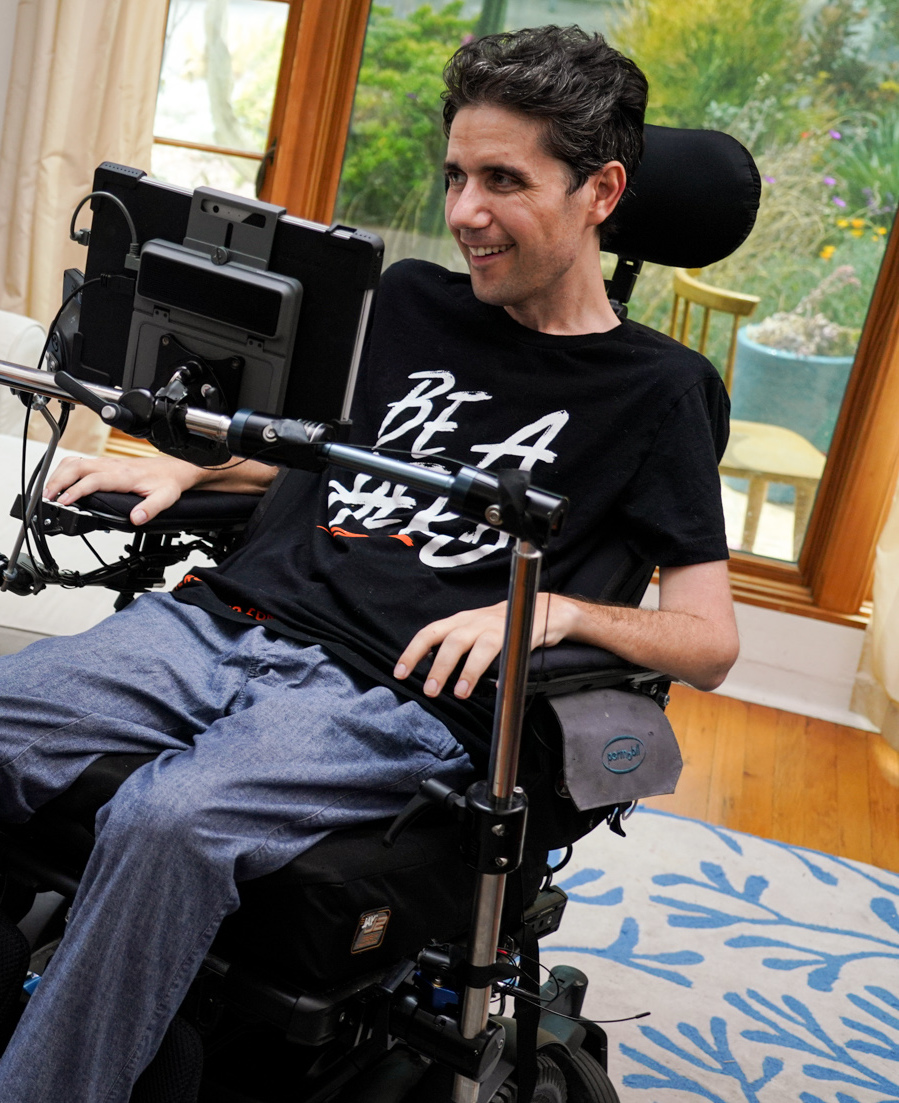
Ady Barkan

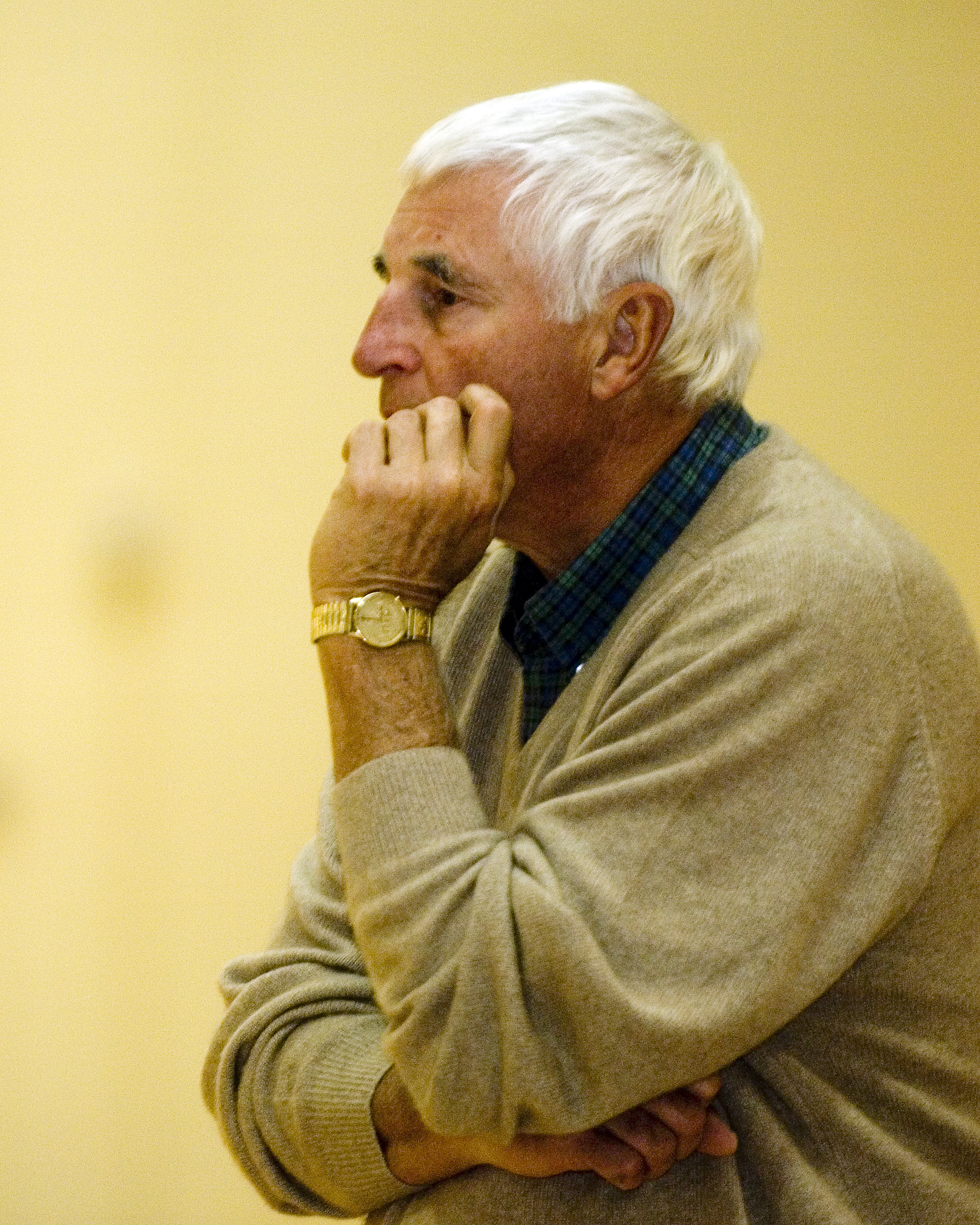
Bob Knight

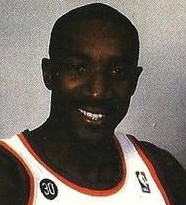
Walter Davis

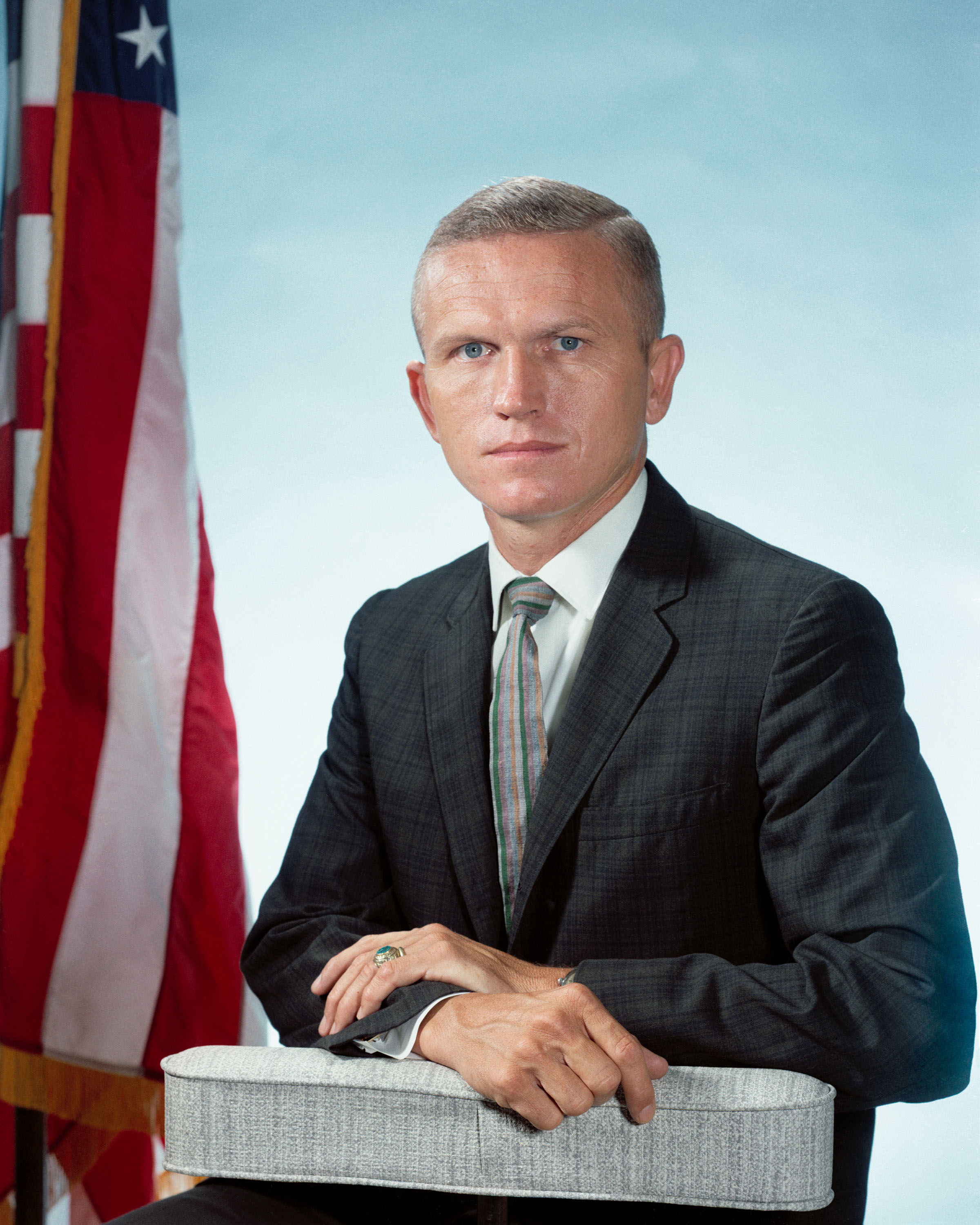
Frank Borman

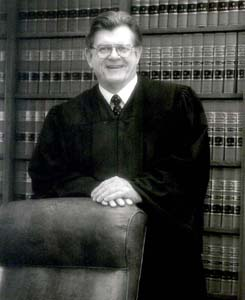
Bruce Sterling Jenkins

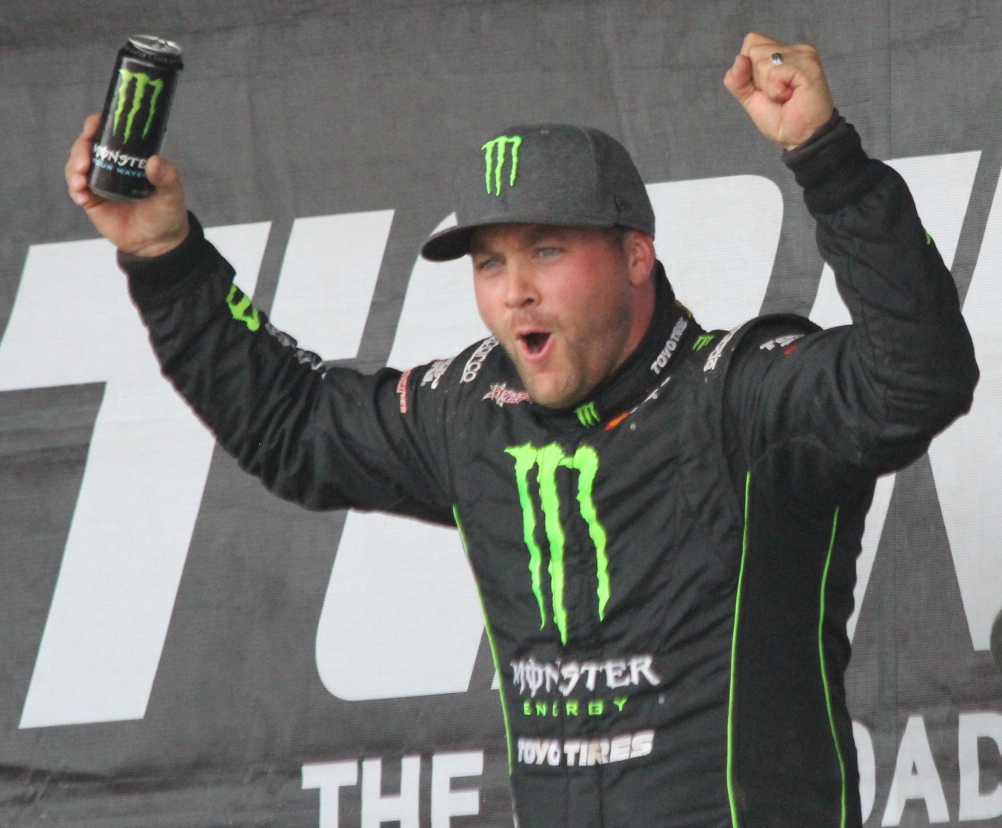
Kyle LeDuc

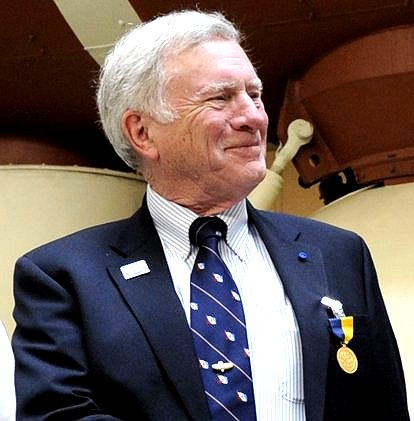
Don Walsh

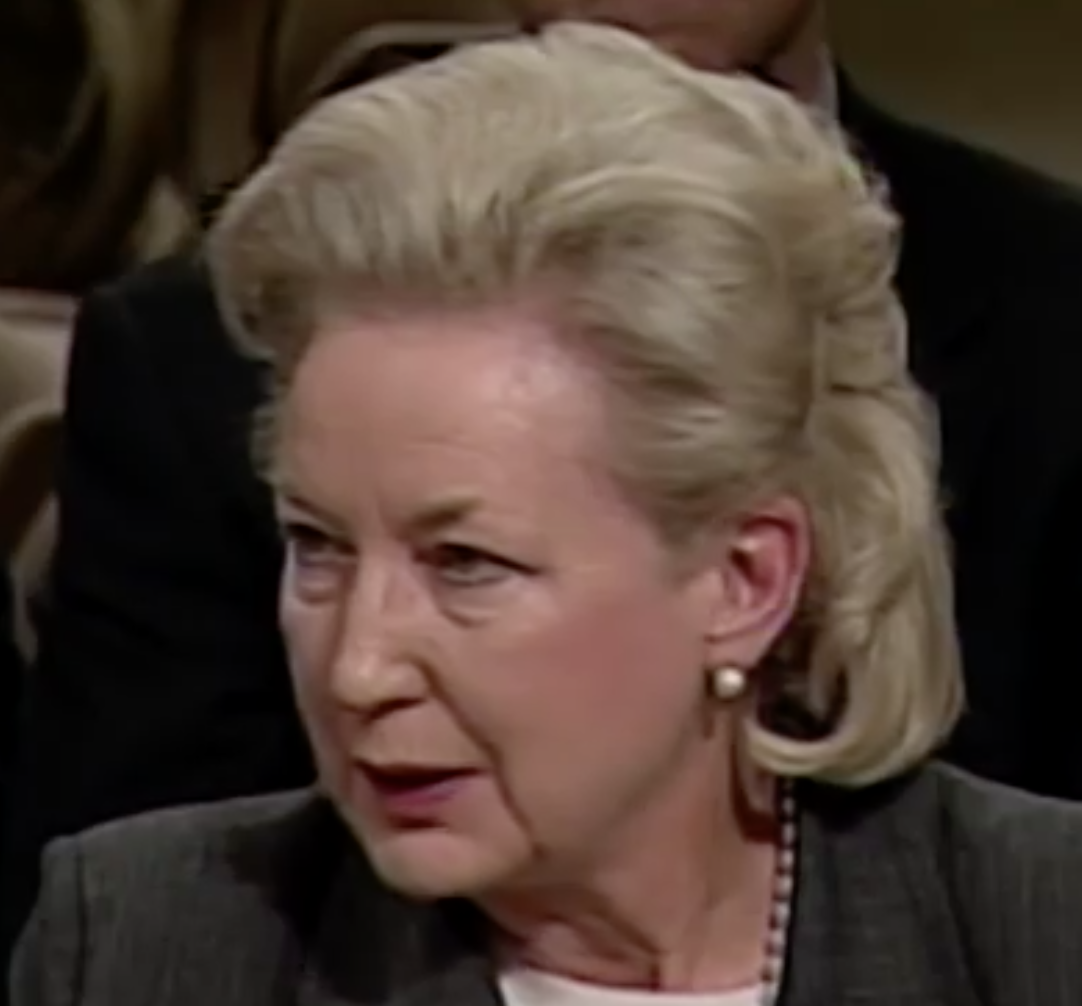
Maryanne Trump Barry

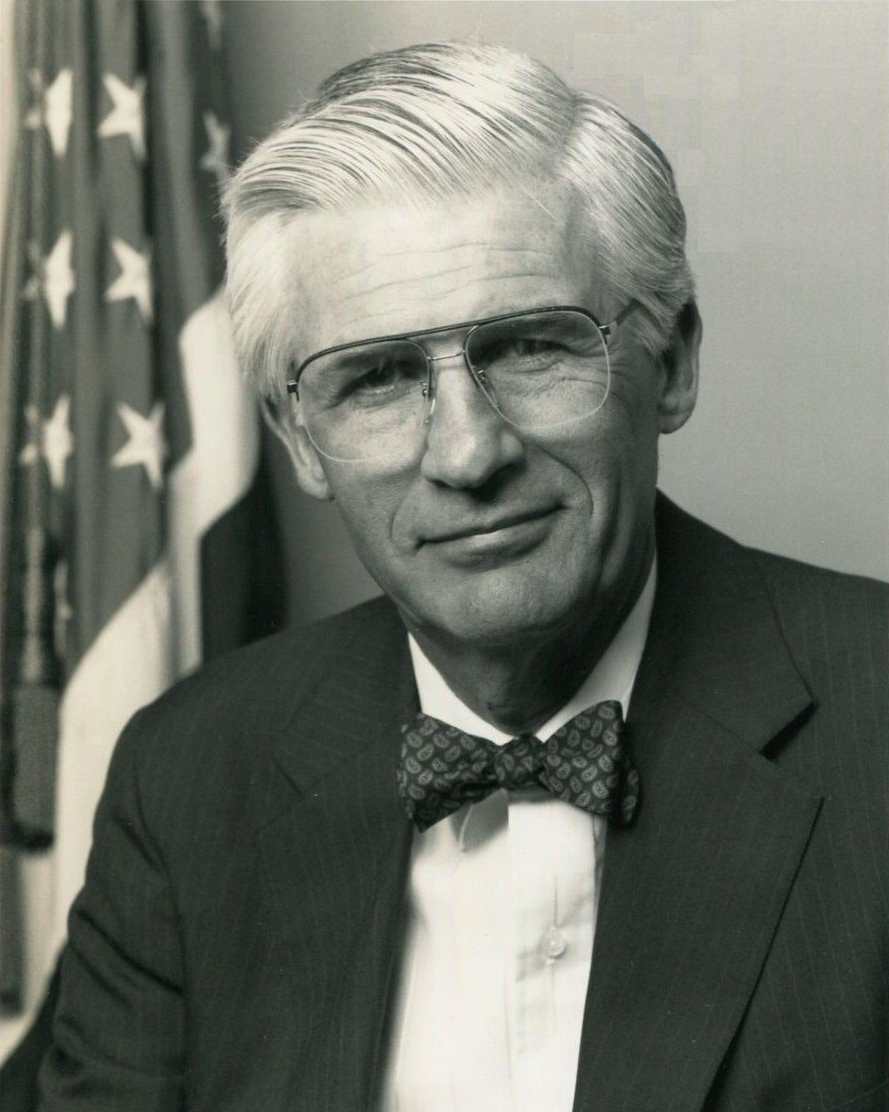
Thomas J. Bliley Jr.

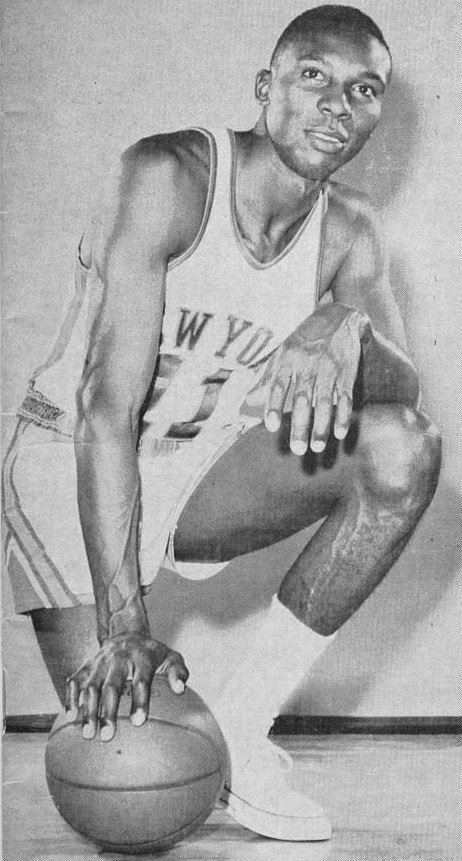
Johnny Green

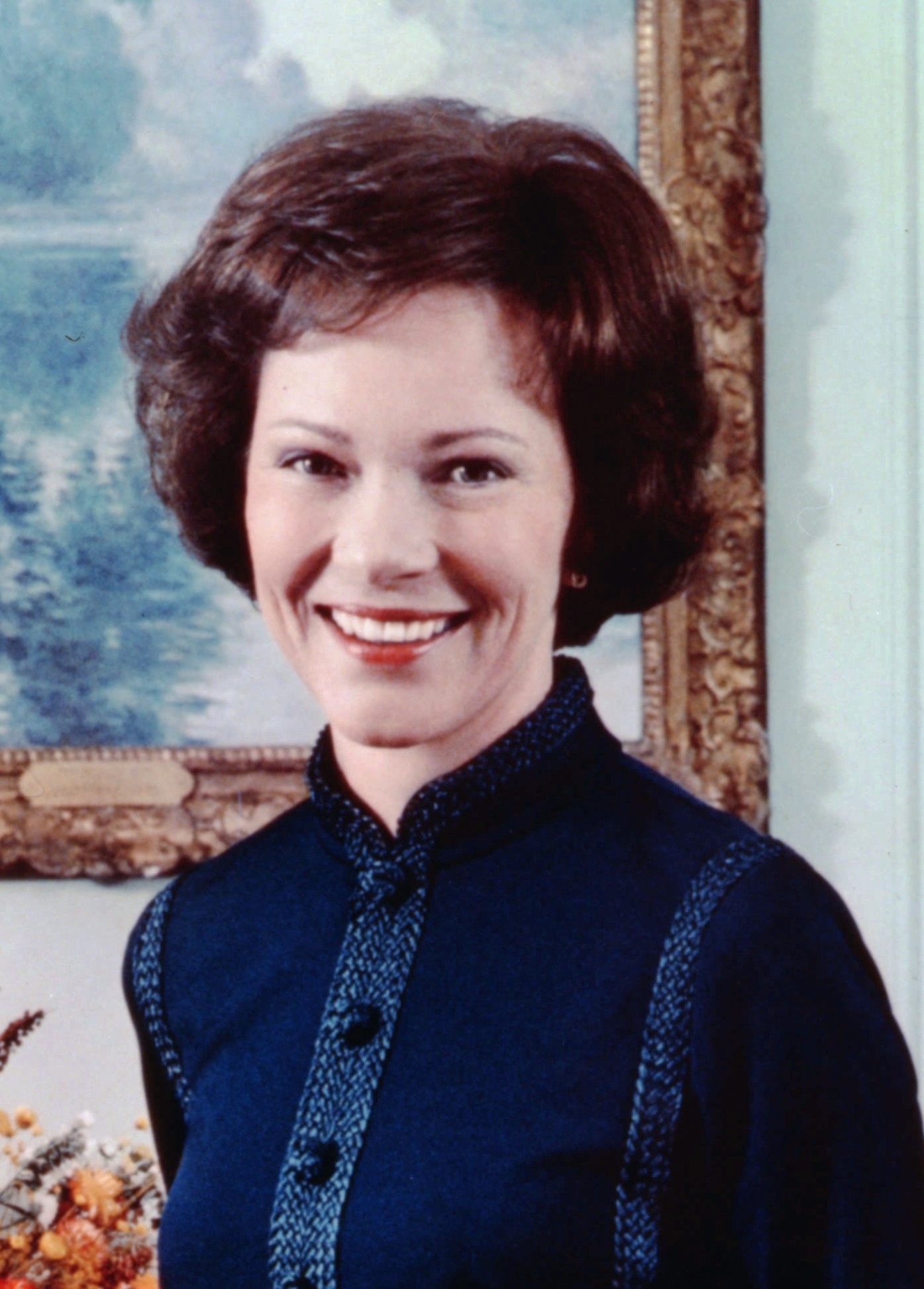
Rosalynn Carter

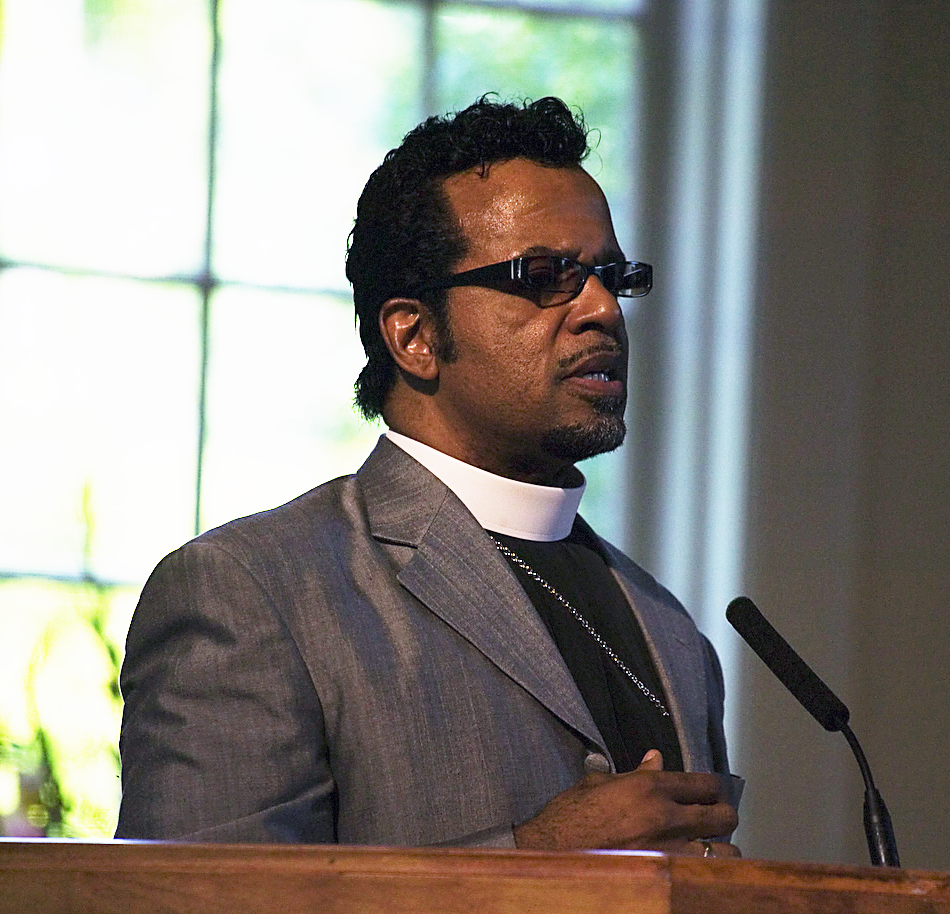
Carlton Pearson

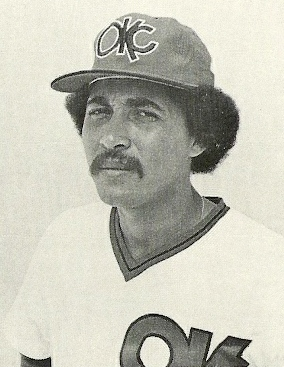
Willie Hernández

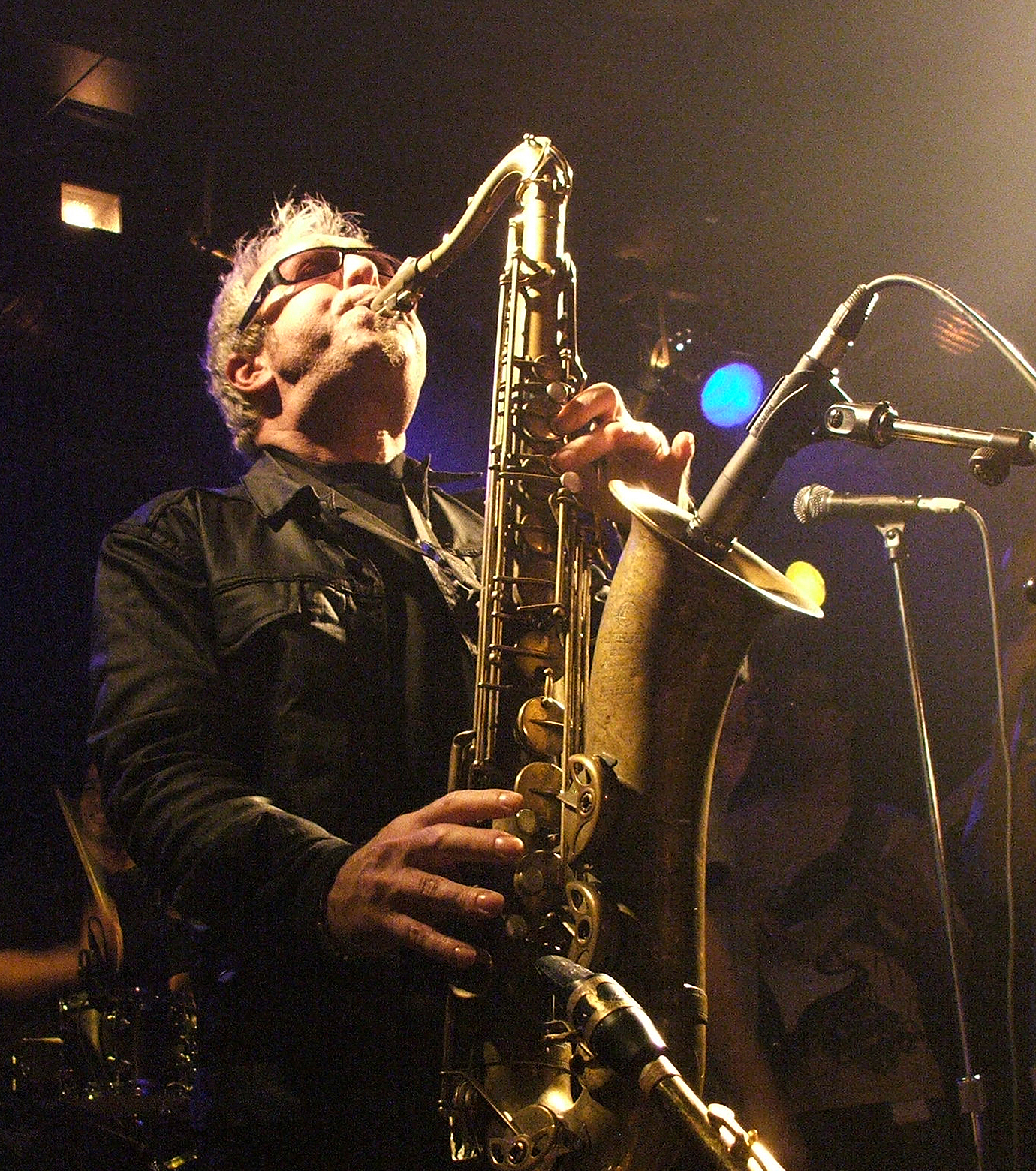
Mars Williams

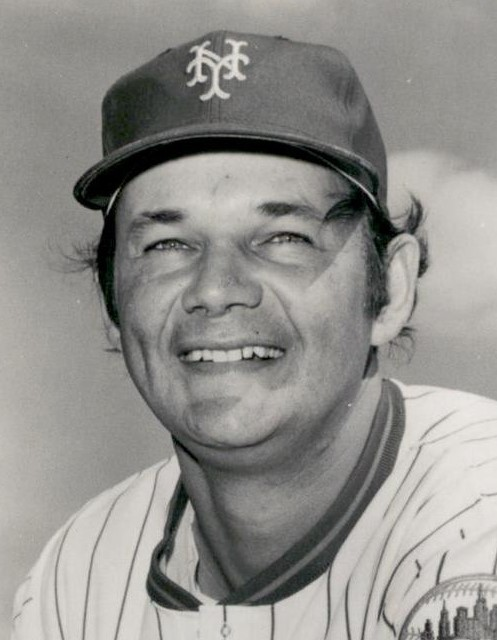
Ron Hodges

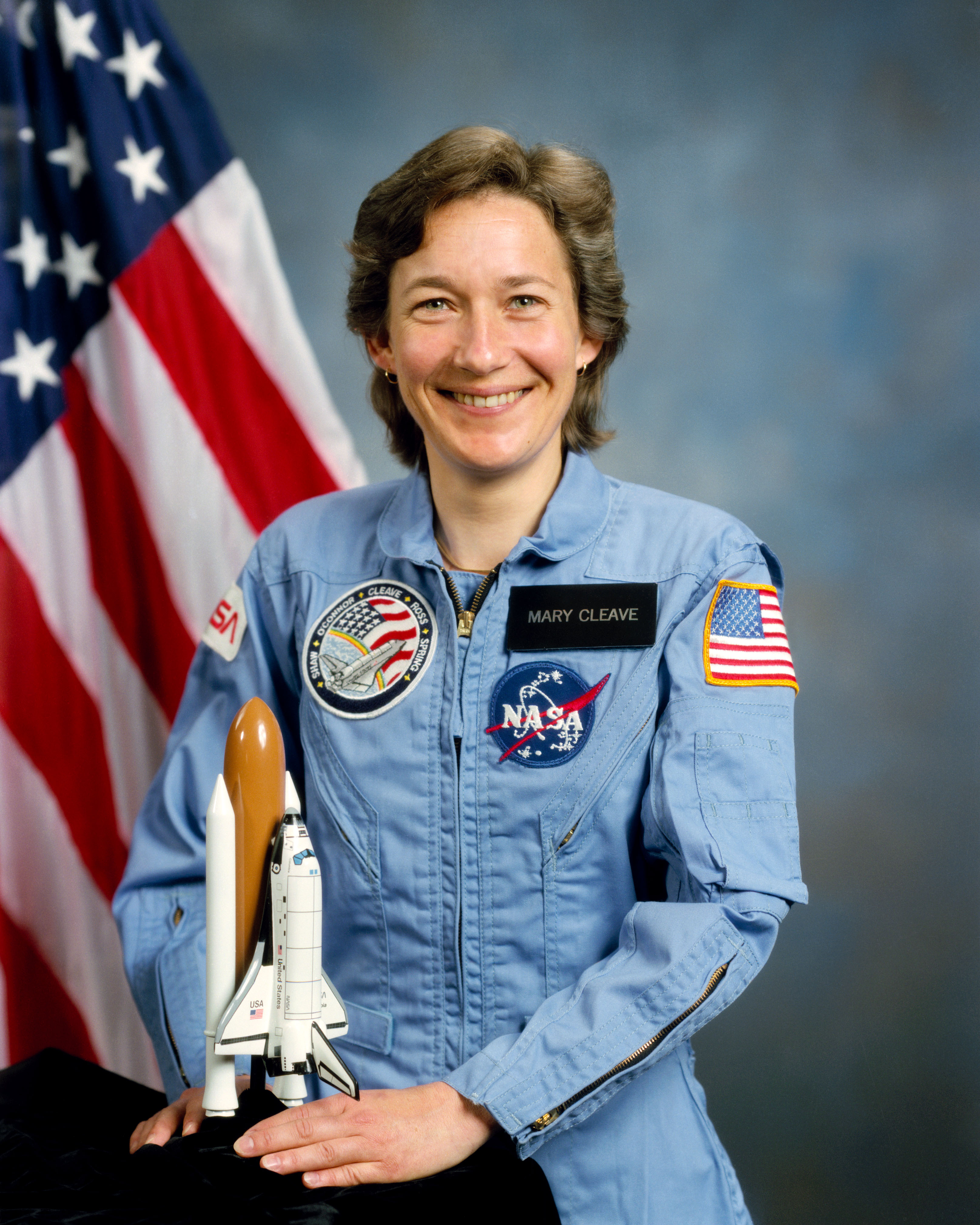
Mary L. Cleave

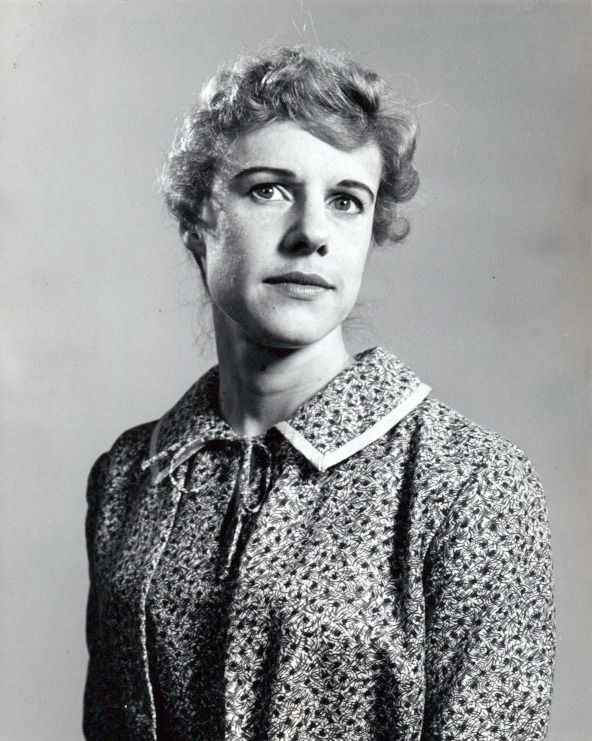
Frances Sternhagen

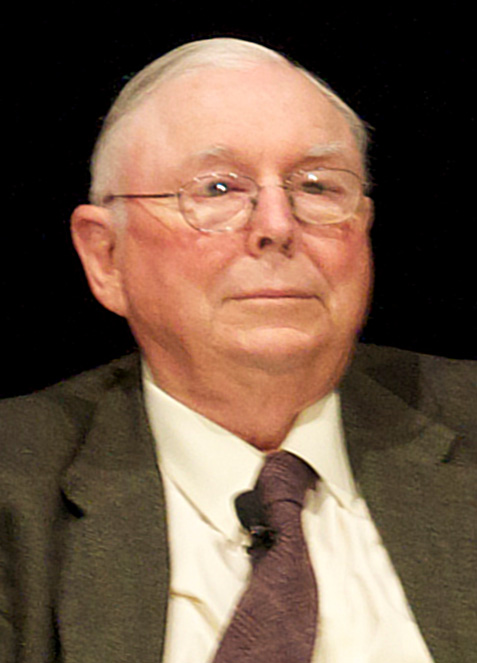
Charlie Munger

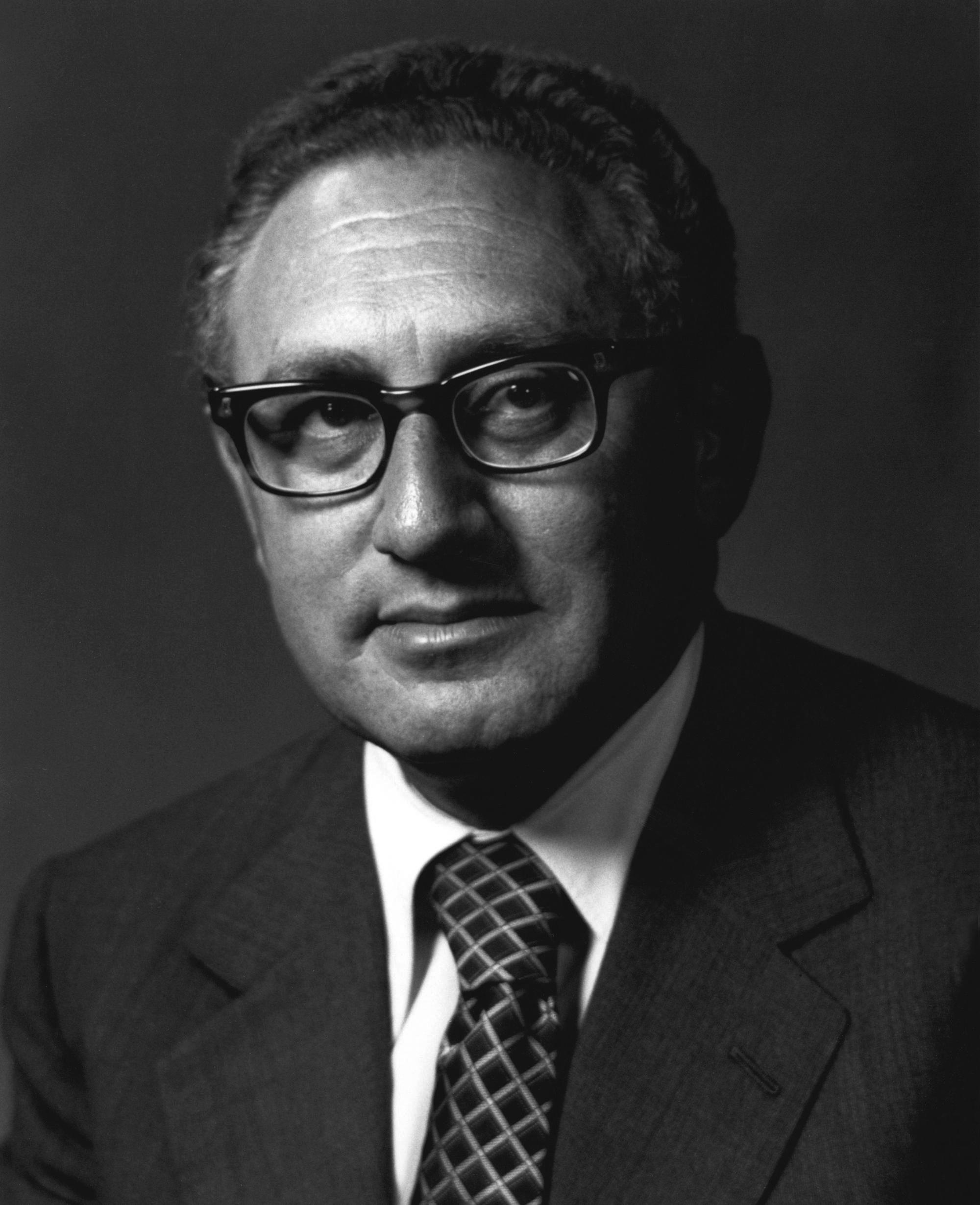
Henry Kissinger

- November 1
  - Ady Barkan, 39, political activist and lawyer (b. 1983)
  - Norma Berger, 90, baseball player (Springfield Sallies) (b. 1932)
  - Geaux Rocket Ride, 3, Thoroughbred racehorse (b. 2020)
  - Bob Knight, 83, Hall of Fame basketball coach (Indiana Hoosiers, Texas Tech Red Raiders, 1984 Olympic Team), Olympic champion (1984) (b. 1940)
  - Peter Tarnoff, 86, politician, under secretary for political affairs (1993–1997), president of the Council on Foreign Relations (1986–1993) (b. 1937)
  - Peter White, 86, actor (The Boys in the Band, All My Children, Dallas) (b. 1937)
- November 2
  - Walter Davis, 69, basketball player (Phoenix Suns, Denver Nuggets), Olympic champion (1976) (b. 1954)
  - Mortimer L. Downey, 87, politician, deputy secretary of transportation (1993–2001) (b. 1936)
  - Dick Drago, 78, baseball player (Boston Red Sox, Kansas City Royals, California Angels) (b. 1945)
  - R. H. Sikes, 83, professional golfer (b. 1940)
  - Brenda Snipes, 80, public official, supervisor of elections for Broward County, Florida (2003–2018) (b. 1943)
  - Leroy Stover, 90, police officer, first black officer in the Birmingham Police Department (b. 1932/1933)
  - Howard Wayne, 75, politician, member of the California State Assembly (1996–2002) (b. 1948)
- November 3
  - Robert Butler, 95, film and television director (Batman, The Computer Wore Tennis Shoes, Hill Street Blues, Remington Steele) (b. 1927)
  - Gary Colson, 89, basketball coach (Valdosta State Blazers, Pepperdine Waves, New Mexico Lobos) (b. 1934)
  - Bubba Copeland, 49, politician, mayor of Smiths Station, Alabama (since 2016) (b. 1974)
  - Dennis Higgins, 84, baseball player (Chicago White Sox, Washington Senators, St. Louis Cardinals) (b. 1939)
  - Betty Reardon, 94, teacher (b. 1929)
  - Martin Shefter, 79, political scientist and author (b. 1943)
  - Priit Vesilind, 80, Estonian-born photojournalist and author (b. 1943)
- November 4
  - Karen Davis, 79, animal rights activist, founder of United Poultry Concerns (b. 1944)
  - Robert G. Doumar, 93, jurist, judge of the U.S. District Court of Eastern Virginia (since 1981) (b. 1930)
  - Art Eckman, 81, sports broadcaster (ESPN, San Francisco Giants, WXIA-TV) (b. 1942)
  - Aaron Harper, 42, basketball player (Chorale Roanne, Levski Sofia, Ferro Carril Oeste) (b. 1981)
  - Philip Meyer, 93, journalist and scholar (b. 1930)
  - Ahmad Tousi, 76, Iranian-born soccer manager (Sanat Naft) (b. 1947)
  - Gary Winnick, 76, businessman, industrialist and billionaire (b. 1946)
- November 5
  - Russell Camilleri, 86, Olympic wrestler (1960, 1964) (b. 1936)
  - John Contoulis, 84, football player (New York Giants) (b. 1939)
  - Evan Ellingson, 35, actor (CSI: Miami, 24, Complete Savages, My Sister's Keeper) (b. 1988)
  - David Ferry, 99, poet, translator and educator (b. 1924)
  - John L. Heilbron, 89, academic and science historian (b. 1934)
  - Pat E. Johnson, 84, choreographer (Enter the Dragon, The Karate Kid, Mortal Kombat) (b. 1939)
  - Matt Ulrich, 41, football player (Indianapolis Colts) (b. 1981)
- November 6
  - Bill Dellastatious, 101, football player (Missouri Tigers) and coach (Missouri State Bears) (b. 1922)
  - Janet Landgard, 75, actress (The Swimmer, The Donna Reed Show, Land Raiders) (b. 1947)
  - Joe Sharkey, 77, author and columnist (b. 1946)
  - Mike Shuster, 76, journalist and blogger (NPR) (b. 1947)
  - Simon Sze, 87, Taiwanese-born electrical engineer (Floating-gate MOSFET) (b. 1936)
  - Carl Torbush, 72, college football (Ole Miss Rebels, North Carolina Tar Heels) and baseball (Southeastern Louisiana Lions) coach (b. 1951)
- November 7
  - Frank Borman, 95, astronaut (Apollo 8) (b. 1928)
  - C-Knight, 52, rapper (The Dove Shack) (b. 1970/1971)
  - Julius Otto Duncan, 97, politician, member of the Texas House of Representatives (1951–1953) (b. 1928)
  - Bruce Sterling Jenkins, 96, judge and politician, member of the U.S. District Court for the District of Utah (since 1978) and Utah Senate (1959–1965) (b. 1927)
  - LaMar Lemmons Jr., 87, politician, member of the Michigan House of Representatives (2005–2010) and businessman (b. 1936)
- November 8
  - Roger Kastel, 92, film poster artist (Jaws, The Empire Strikes Back, Doc Savage: The Man of Bronze) (b. 1931)
- November 9
  - R.L. Boyce, 68, blues musician (b. 1955)
  - David Gauthier, 91, Canadian-born philosopher (b. 1932)
  - Alan Hevesi, 83, politician, comptroller of New York City (1994–2001) and New York State (2003–2006) (b. 1940)
  - Kurt Olson, 75, politician, member of the Alaska House of Representatives (2005–2017) (b. 1948)
  - John Sayre, 87, rower, Olympic champion (1960) (b. 1936)
  - John Tooby, 71, anthropologist (b. 1952)
- November 10
  - John Bailey, 81, cinematographer (Ordinary People, The Big Chill, Groundhog Day), president of the Academy of Motion Picture Arts and Sciences (2017–2019) (b. 1942)
  - Henry Dunay, 88, goldsmith and jewelry designer (b. 1935)
  - Charles Jordan, 69, basketball player (Indiana Pacers, ASVEL, Fortitudo Bologna) (b. 1954)
- November 11
  - D. J. Hayden, 33, football player (Oakland Raiders, Detroit Lions, Jacksonville Jaguars) (b. 1990)
  - Clarence A. Holland, 94, politician, member of the Virginia Senate (1984–1996) and mayor of Virginia Beach (1976–1978) (b. 1929)
  - Kyle LeDuc, 42, racing driver (Lucas Oil Off Road Racing Series, Championship Off-Road, Extreme E) (b. 1981)
  - Dave Stenhouse, 90, baseball player (Washington Senators) (b. 1933)
  - Conny Van Dyke, 78, singer and actress (Hell's Angels '69, W.W. and the Dixie Dancekings, Framed) (b. 1945)
  - Edith D. Warren, 86, politician and educator, member of the North Carolina General Assembly (1999–2012) (b. 1937)
  - Tom Zych, 83, politician and minister (b. 1940)
- November 12
  - M. Russell Ballard, 95, Mormon leader, member of the Quorum of the Twelve Apostles (since 1985) (b. 1928)
  - Peter J. Boylan, 87, major general (b. 1936)
  - Paul Martin Lester, 70, professor (b. 1953)
  - Elinor Otto, 104, factory worker, an original Rosie the Riveter (b. 1919)
  - Kevin Turen, 44, film and television producer (Euphoria, X, The Unbearable Weight of Massive Talent, Pieces of a Woman) (b. 1979)
  - Don Walsh, 92, oceanographer, explorer, and marine policy specialist (b. 1931)
- November 13
  - Maryanne Trump Barry, 86, judge and attorney, judge of the United States Court of Appeals for the Third Circuit (1999–2019) (b. 1937)
  - Rob Belloir, 75, baseball player (Atlanta Braves) (b. 1948)
  - Michael Bishop, 78, science fiction author (No Enemy But Time, Who Made Stevie Crye?, Brittle Innings) (b. 1945)
  - Lundy Kiger, 69, politician, member of the Oklahoma House of Representatives (2018–2020) (b. 1954)
  - Hoy Menear, politician, member of the New Hampshire House of Representatives (2012–2014, 2022–2023)
  - Robert Philibosian, 83, politician, Los Angeles County district attorney (1981–1984) (b. 1940)
  - George Tscherny, 99, Hungarian-born graphic designer and educator (b. 1924)
  - Work All Week, 14, Throughbred racehorse (b. 2009)
  - Devon Wylie, 35, football player (Kansas City Chiefs, Tennessee Titans) (b. 1988) (death announced on this date)
- November 14
  - Rick Ahearn, 74, political consultant (b. 1949)
  - Ken Adamson, 85, football player (Denver Broncos) (b. 1938)
  - Neville Garrick, 73, Jamaican-born graphic artist and photographer (b. 1950)
  - Betty Rollin, 87, journalist (b. 1936)
  - Peter Seidler, 63, baseball executive, chairman of San Diego Padres (since 2020) (b. 1960)
  - Terry R. Taylor, 71, sports editor (Associated Press) (b. 1952)
  - Thelda Williams, 82, politician, interim mayor of Phoenix (1994, 2011–2012, 2018–2019) (b. 1941)
- November 15
  - Radcliffe Bailey, 54, visual artist (b. 1968)
  - Dex Carvey, 32, comedian (b. 1991)
  - Sandy Farina, 68, singer-songwriter and actress (Sgt. Pepper's Lonely Hearts Club Band) (b. 1955)
  - Frank Heffron, 87, politician, member of the New Hampshire House of Representatives (2012–2016).
  - Willard Johnson, 87, political scientist and africanist (b. 1935) (death announced on this date)
  - Worta McCaskill-Stevens, 74, physician-scientist (b. 1949)
  - Ken Squier, 88, Hall of Fame motorsport sportscaster (NASCAR on CBS), co-founder of Motor Racing Network (b. 1935)
  - Jeanette Stocker, 96, baseball player (Kenosha Comets) (b. 1927)
- November 16
  - Thomas J. Bliley Jr., 91, politician, member of the U.S. House of Representatives (1981–2001) and mayor of Richmond (1970–1977) (b. 1932)
  - George Brown, 74, drummer (Kool & the Gang) (b. 1949)
  - Johnny Green, 89, basketball player (New York Knicks) (b. 1933)
  - James Paul Johnson, 93, lawyer, politician, member of the Colorado House of Representatives (1973–1981) (b. 1930)
  - Sarah Louise Keys, 95, civil rights activist (b. 1928)
  - Bobby Ussery, 88, Hall of Fame jockey (b. 1935)
- November 17
  - Charlie Dominici, 72, singer (Dream Theater, Dominici) (b. 1951) (death announced on this date)
  - Merle Goldman, 92, historian and academic scholar (b. 1931)
  - H. Roger Grant, 79, railroad historian and author (b. 1943/1944)
  - Suzanne Shepherd, 89, actress (Mystic Pizza, Goodfellas, Requiem for a Dream, The Sopranos) (b. 1934)
  - Lou Skizas, 91, baseball player (Kansas City Athletics, Detroit Tigers, Chicago White Sox) (b. 1932)
- November 18
  - David Del Tredici, 86, composer (b. 1937)
- November 19
  - Rosalynn Carter, 96, mental health activist, first lady of the United States (1977–1981) and of Georgia (1971–1975) (b. 1927)
  - Roslynn Cobarrubias, 43, television presenter, producer and speaker (b. 1980)
  - Herbert Gold, 99, novelist (b. 1924)
  - Carlton Pearson, 70, minister and gospel music artist (b. 1953)
  - Peter Spellos, 69, voice actor (Transformers: Robots in Disguise, Digimon Adventure, Men in Black II) (b. 1954)
- November 20
  - Alice Denney, 101, art curator (b. 1922)
  - Preston Hanna, 69, baseball player (Atlanta Braves, Oakland Athletics) (b. 1954)
  - Willie Hernández, 69, baseball player (Chicago Cubs, Philadelphia Phillies, Detroit Tigers) (b. 1954)
  - John E. Walsh, 65, political consultant, chair of the Massachusetts Democratic Party (2007–2013) (b. 1958)
  - Mars Williams, 68, saxophonist (The Psychedelic Furs, The Waitresses) (b. 1955)
- November 21
  - Ron Acks, 79, football player (Atlanta Falcons, New England Patriots, Green Bay Packers) (b. 1944)
  - Francis R. Nicosia, 79, historian (b. 1944)
  - James Philip, 93, politician, president of the Illinois Senate (1993–2003) (b. 1930)
  - Stravinsky, 27, Thoroughbred racehorse (b. 1996)
  - Dave Young, 64, football player (New York Giants, Baltimore/Indianapolis Colts) (b. 1959)
- November 22
  - Tom Larson, 84, sportscaster (WSBK-TV, NESN) (b. 1938/1939)
  - Jean Knight, 80, singer ("Mr. Big Stuff") (b. 1943)
  - Nguyen Qui Duc, 64–65, Vietnamese-born radio broadcaster, writer and translator (b. 1958)
  - Steve Pool, 70, television meteorologist (KOMO-TV) (b. 1953)
  - Phil Quartararo, 67, music industry executive (b. 1956)
  - Jim Salestrom, 67, singer-songwriter (b. 1956)
  - Linda Salzman Sagan, 83, artist and writer (b. 1940)
- November 23
  - Jim Carter, 75, football player (Green Bay Packers) (b. 1948)
  - Steve Jurczyk, 61, engineer, acting administrator of NASA (2021) (b. 1962)
  - Mark Kellar, 71, football player (Minnesota Vikings, San Antonio Wings, Chicago Fire) (b. 1952)
  - Charles Peters, 96, journalist, editor, author, founder and editor-in-chief of Washington Monthly (b. 1926)
  - Greg "Fingers" Taylor, 71, harmonica player (b. 1952)
- November 24
  - Douglas Ahlstedt, 78, operatic tenor (b. 1945)
  - George Cohon, 86, American-born Canadian fast food executive, founder of McDonald's Canada and McDonald's Russia (b. 1937)
  - Ron Hodges, 74, baseball player (New York Mets) (b. 1949)
  - Herb Klein, 93, politician, member of the U.S. House of Representatives (1993–1995) (b. 1930)
  - Elliot Silverstein, 96, film and television director (Naked City, Cat Ballou, A Man Called Horse) (b. 1927)
  - Marc Thorpe, 77, visual effects artist (Star Wars, Raiders of the Lost Ark, Howard the Duck) (b. 1945/1946)
- November 25
  - Douglas D. Alder, 91, historian and academic administrator, president of Utah Tech University (1986–1993) (b. 1932)
  - Whitney Anderson, 91, politician and businessman (b. 1931)
  - Robert Hart Baker, 69, symphonic and operatic conductor and music director (b. 1954)
  - Larry Fink, 82, photographer (b. 1941) (death announced on this date)
  - Clarke Ingram, 66, historian and radio personality (b. 1957/1958)
- November 26
  - Tim Dorsey, 62, novelist (Florida Roadkill, Hammerhead Ranch Motel) (b. 1961)
  - Pablo Guzmán, 73, television journalist (WCBS-TV) (b. 1950)
  - Jimmy Owens, 93, songwriter (Jimmy and Carol Owens) (b. 1930)
- November 27
  - Bob Albright, 87, politician, member of the Alabama House of Representatives (1974–1986) (b. 1936)
  - William Anastasi, 90, conceptual artist (b. 1933)
  - Susan Catania, 81, politician, member of the Illinois House of Representatives (1973–1983) (b. 1941)
  - Mary L. Cleave, 76, astronaut (b. 1947)
  - Victor J. Kemper, 96, cinematographer (Dog Day Afternoon, National Lampoon's Vacation, Pee-wee's Big Adventure), president of the American Society of Cinematographers (1993–1996, 1999–2001) (b. 1927)
  - John Nichols, 83, novelist (The Sterile Cuckoo, The Wizard of Loneliness, The Milagro Beanfield War) (b. 1940) (death announced on this date)
  - Edward G. Smith, 62, jurist, judge of the U.S. District Court for Eastern Pennsylvania (since 2014) (b. 1961)
  - William Michael Stankewicz, 78, teacher and convicted attempted murderer (b. 1944/1945)
  - Frances Sternhagen, 93, actress (The Hospital, Outland, Cheers), Tony winner (1974, 1995) (b. 1930)
- November 28
  - Thomas Augsberger, 60, German-born film producer (Tucker & Dale vs. Evil, Waiting..., Mr. Brooks) (b. 1962/1963)
  - Julius W. Becton Jr., 97, military officer, director of FEMA (1985–1989) (b. 1926)
  - Mark Candon, 71, politician (b. 1952)
  - John Colianni, 61, jazz pianist (b. 1962)
  - Charlie Munger, 99, investor and businessman (Berkshire Hathaway) (b. 1924)
- November 29
  - Charles Gilchrist Adams, 86, Baptist minister (b. 1936)
  - Richard L. Berkley, 92, politician, mayor of Kansas City, Missouri (1979–1991) (b. 1931)
  - Elliott Erwitt, 95, French-born photographer (b. 1928)
  - Scott Kempner, 69, guitarist (The Dictators, The Del-Lords) (b. 1954)
  - Henry Kissinger, 100, German-born diplomat, national security advisor (1969–1975) and secretary of state (1973–1977), Nobel Peace Prize recipient (1973) (b. 1923)
  - Mildred Miller, 98, mezzo-soprano (b. 1924)
  - Michael Oleksa, 76, Russian Orthodox priest, linguist and writer (b. 1947)
- November 30
  - William P. Murphy Jr., 100, physician and inventor (b. 1923)
  - Paul Snyder, 88, baseball executive (Atlanta Braves) (b. 1935)
  - Edwin Yoder, 89, journalist (b. 1934)

== December ==
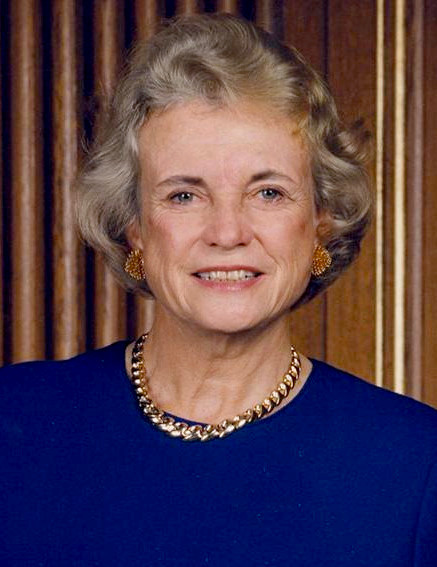
Sandra Day O'Connor

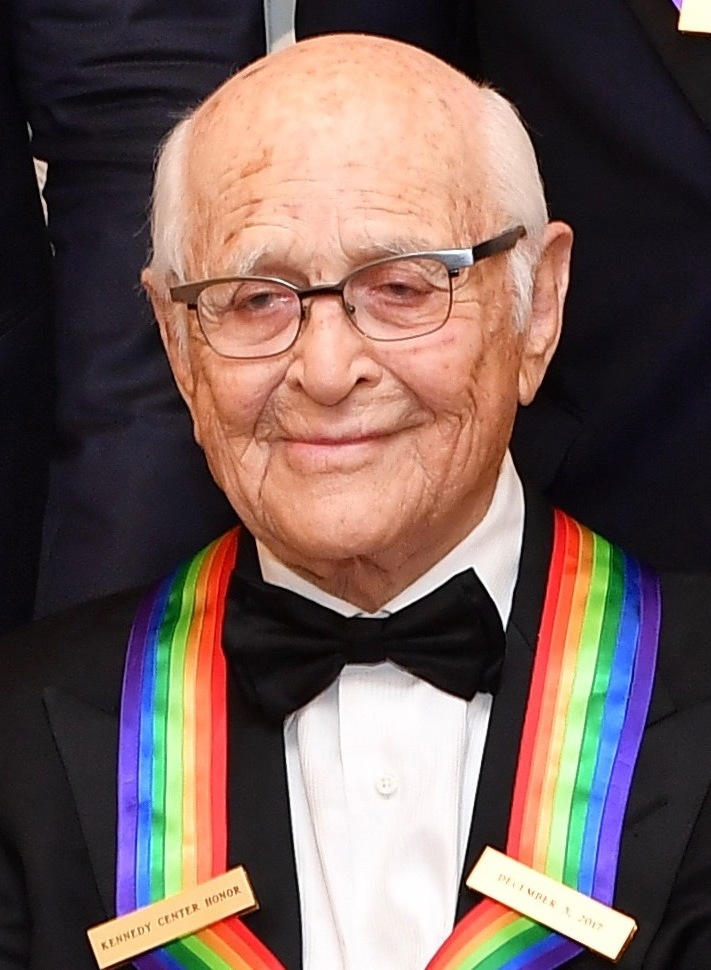
Norman Lear

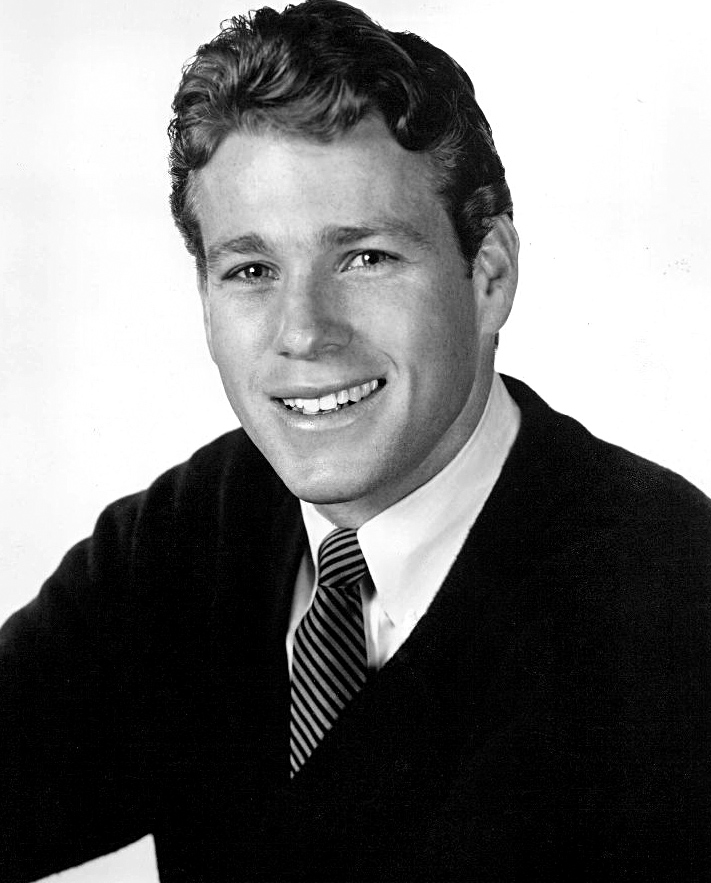
Ryan O'Neal

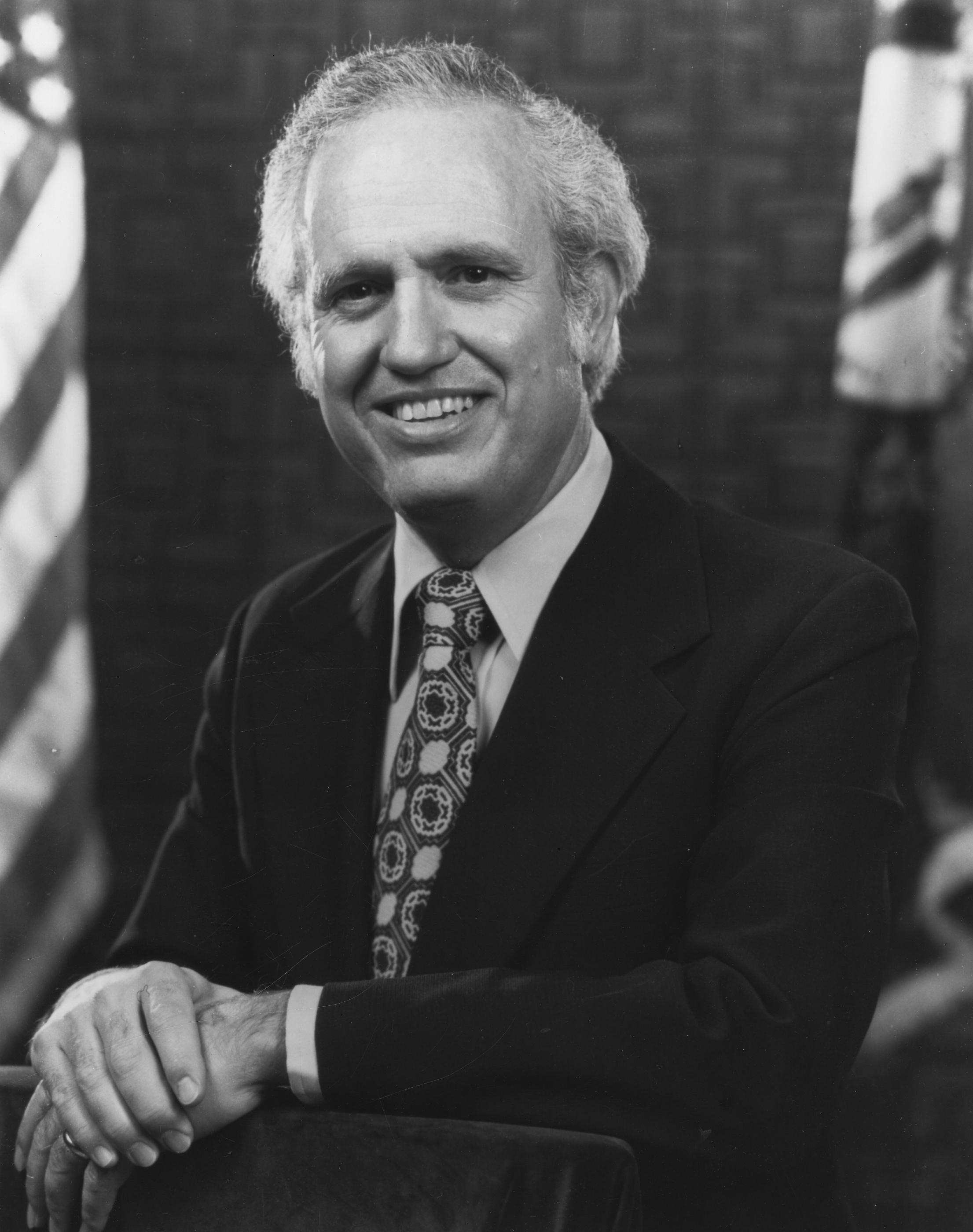
Julian Carroll

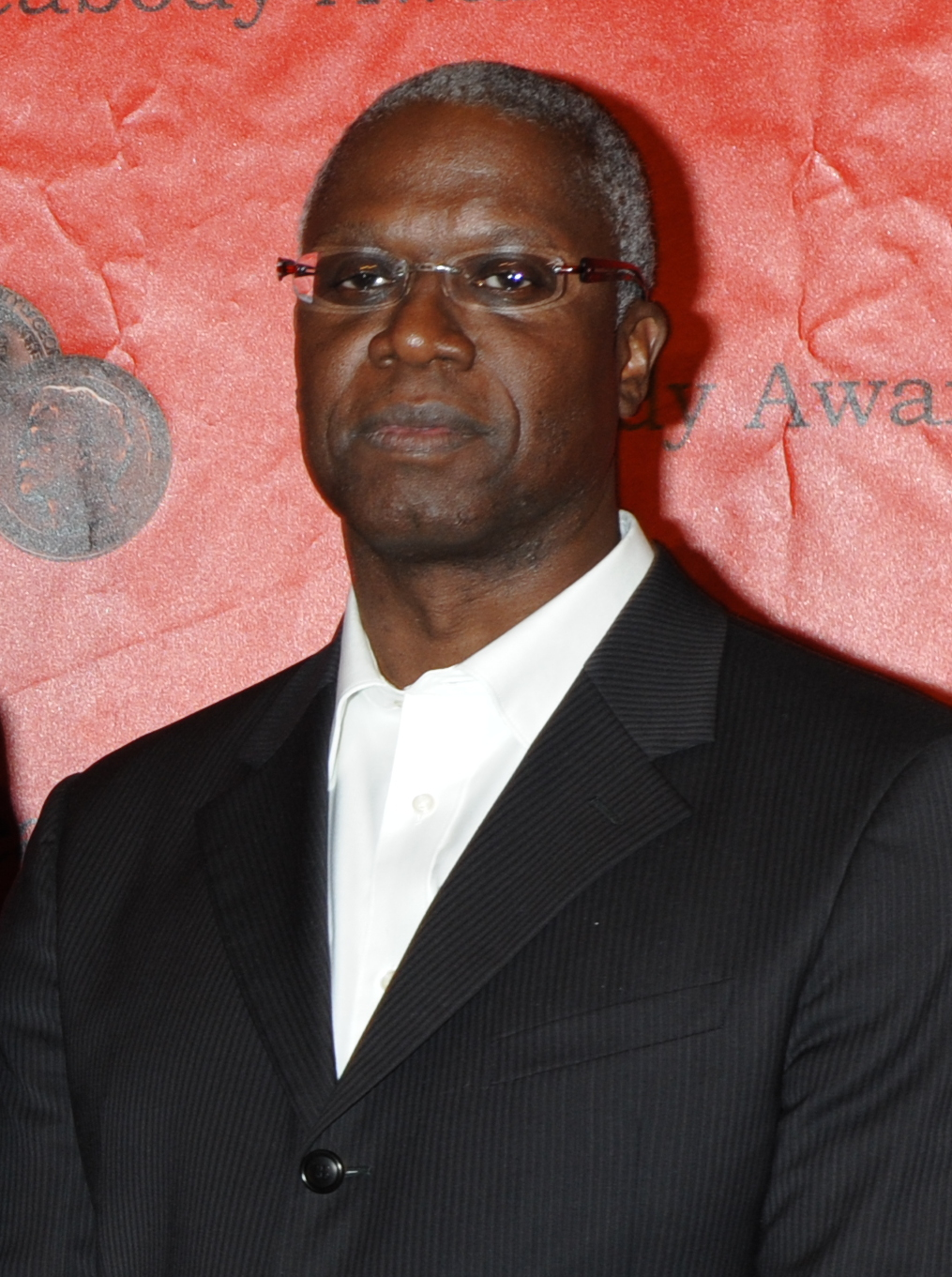
Andre Braugher

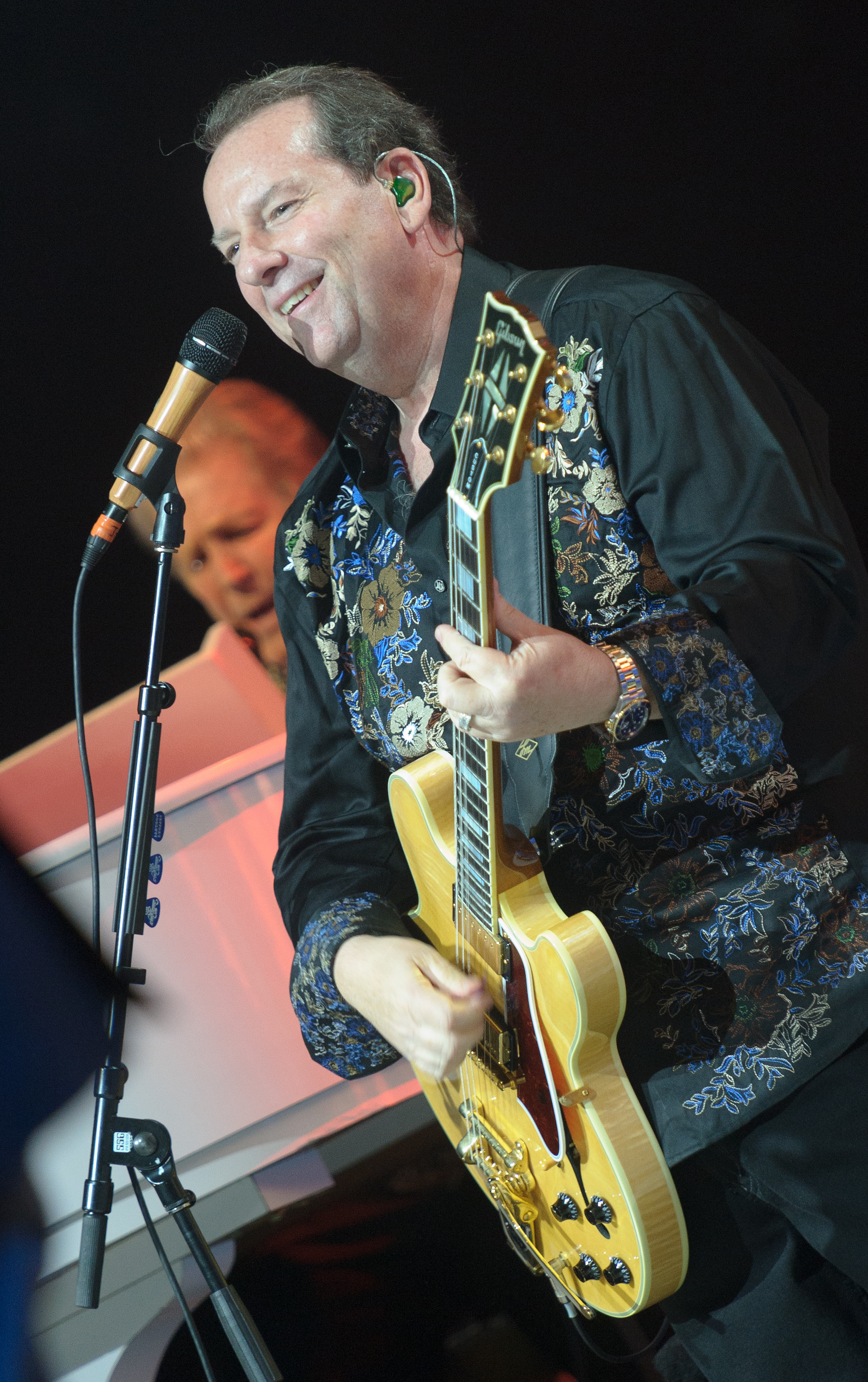
Jeffrey Foskett

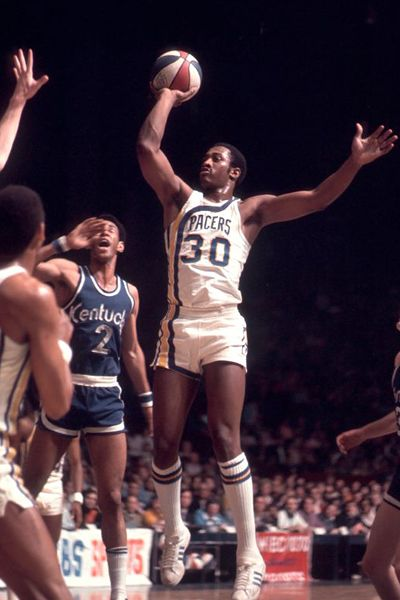
George McGinnis

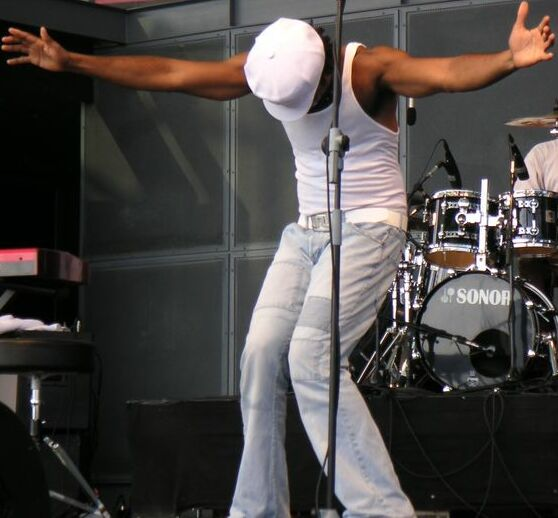
Amp Fiddler

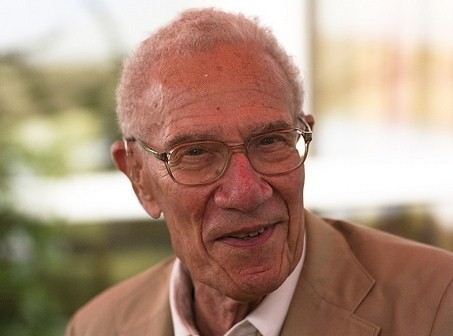
Robert Solow

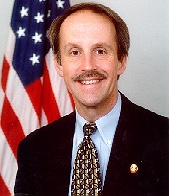
Frank Riggs

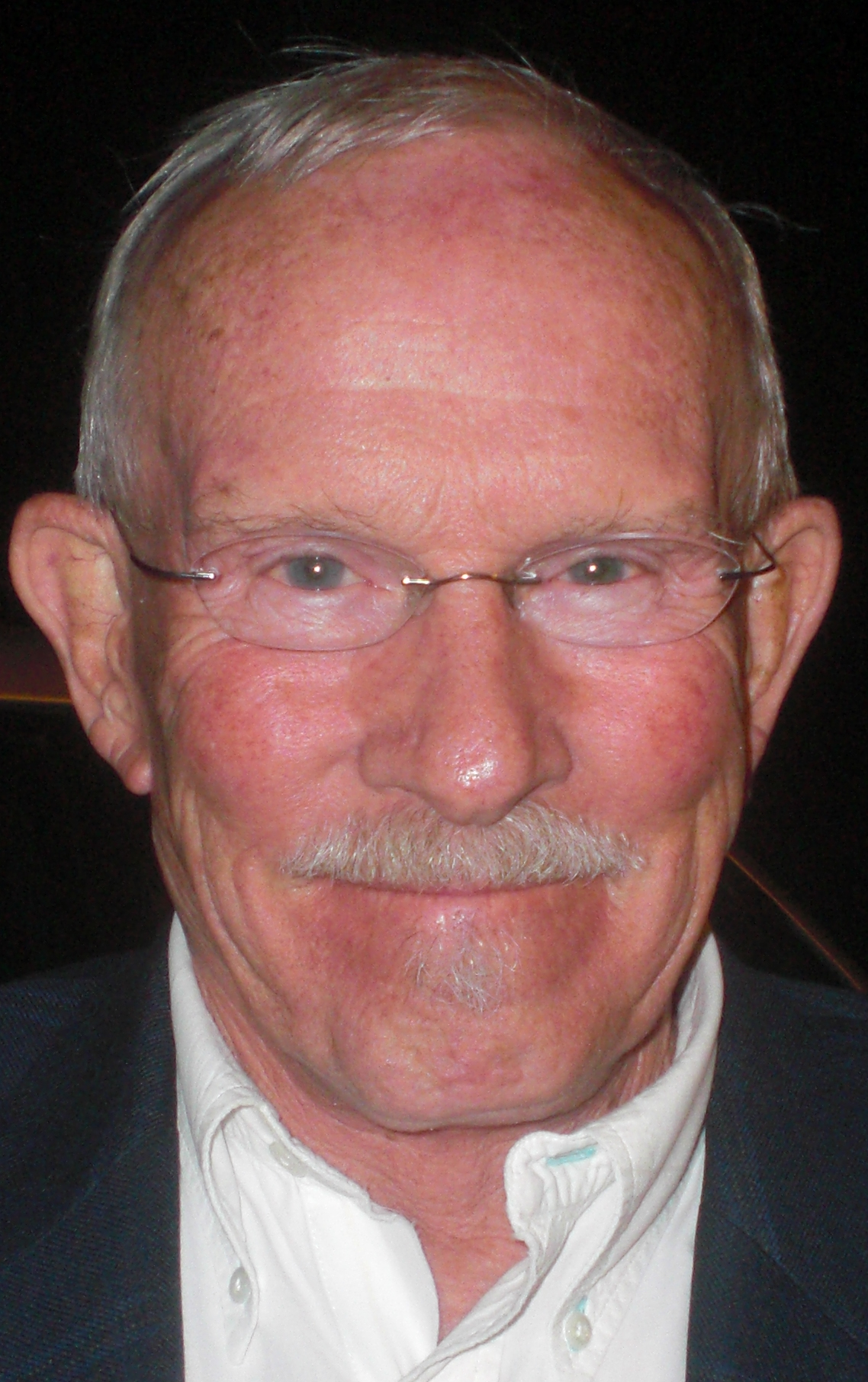
Tom Smothers

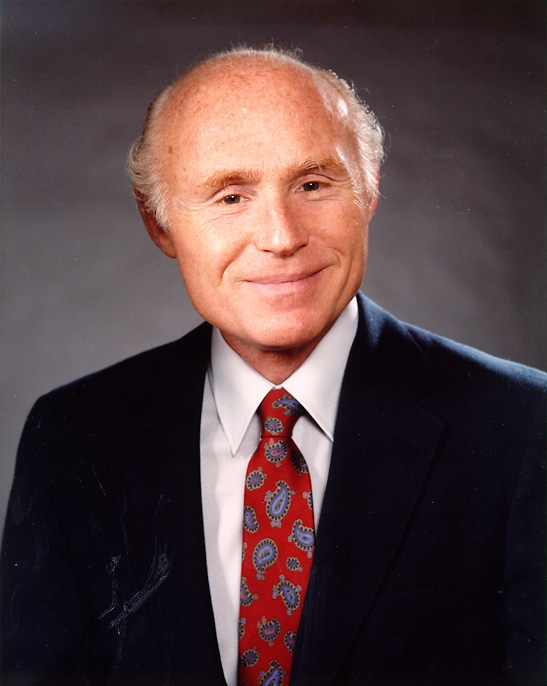
Herb Kohl

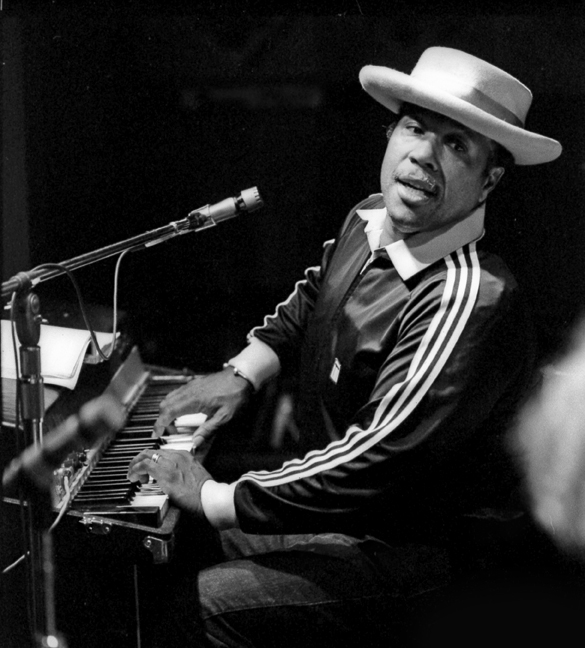
Les McCann

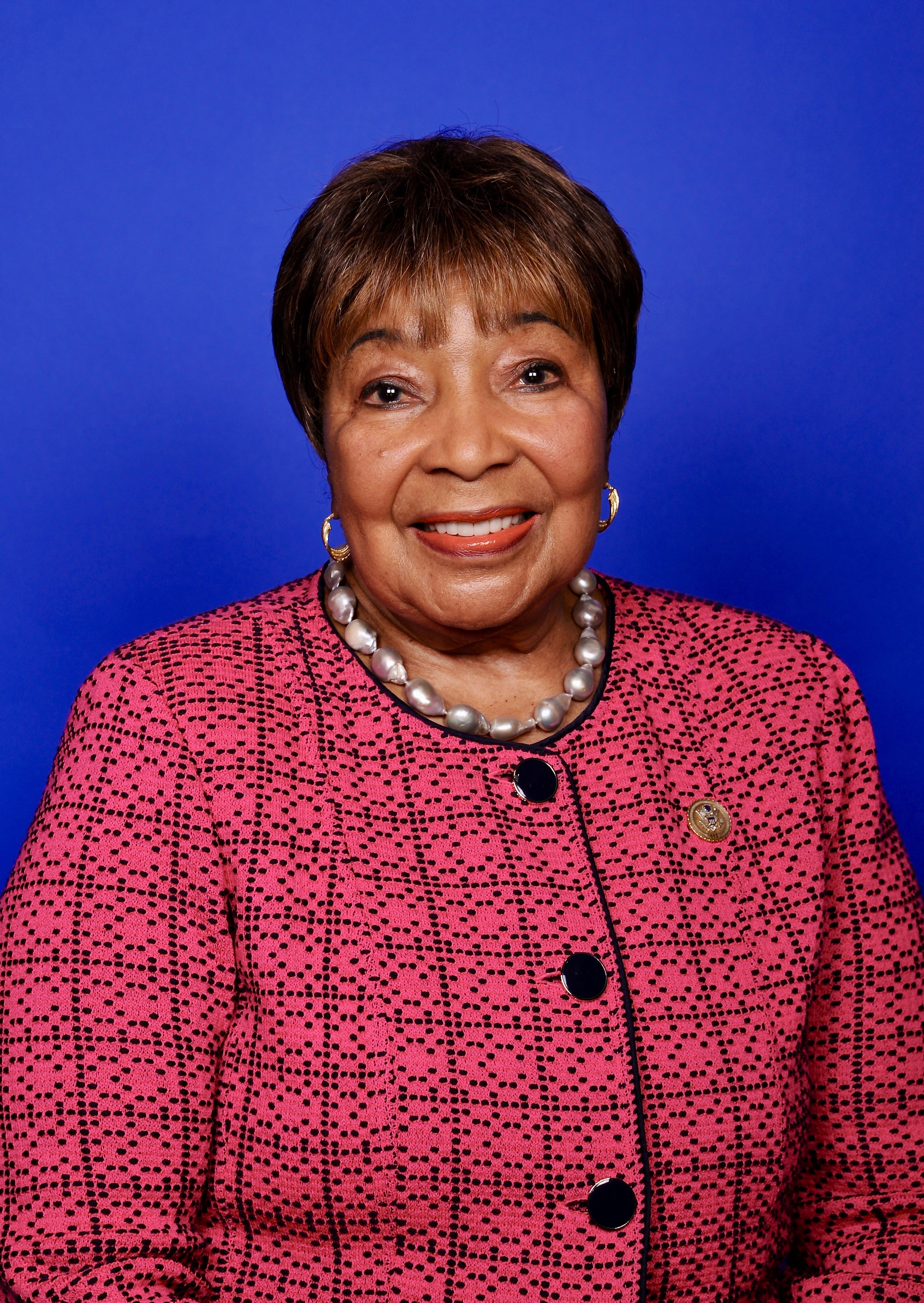
Eddie Bernice Johnson

- December 1
  - Sandra Day O'Connor, 93, jurist, associate justice of the supreme court (1981–2006), member of the Arizona Senate (1969–1975) and chancellor of the College of William & Mary (2005–2012) (b. 1930)
  - Lyle Elmer Strom, 98, jurist, judge (since 1985) and chief judge (1987–1994) of the U.S. District Court for Nebraska (b. 1925)
- December 2
  - Stanley Graham, 97, psychologist, president of the American Psychological Association (1990) (b. 1926)
  - Clarence Kelly, 82, sedevacantist traditionalist Catholic prelate, superior general of the Society of Saint Pius V (since 1983) (b. 1941)
  - Joe Hicks, 91, baseball player (Chicago White Sox, Washington Senators, New York Mets) (b. 1932)
  - Maria Martin, 72, Mexican-born radio journalist (Latino USA) (b. 1951)
  - Edwin J. Peterson, 93, jurist, justice (1979–1993) and chief justice (1983–1991) of the Oregon Supreme Court (b. 1930)
  - Edwin Wilson, 96, theater critic (The Wall Street Journal) (b. 1927)
- December 3
  - Claude Engle, 85, electrical engineer (b. 1938)
  - Andrea Fay Friedman, 53, actress (Life Goes On, Family Guy) (b. 1970)
  - David McKnight, 87, actor (J. D.'s Revenge, Hollywood Shuffle, The Five Heartbeats) (b. 1936)
  - Jerome O'Neill, 77, attorney, U.S. attorney for the District of Vermont (1981) (b. 1946)
- December 4
  - Juanita Castro, 90, Cuban-born activist (b. 1933)
  - James L. Easton, 88, businessman, philanthropist, and Hall of Fame archer, president of the World Archery Federation (1989–2005) (b. 1935)
  - Edgar S. Woolard Jr., 89, businessman (DuPont) (b. 1934)
- December 5
  - Ralph Cirella, 58, stylist and makeup artist (b. 1964/1965)
  - Lionel Dahmer, 87, chemist (b. 1936)
  - Ron Fernandes, 72, football player (Baltimore Colts) (b. 1951)
  - Vojislav Govedarica, 82–83, Serbian-born actor (Rambo: First Blood Part II, Little Nikita, Lionheart) (b. 1940)
  - Norman Lear, 101, screenwriter and producer (All in the Family, Maude, The Jeffersons) (b. 1922)
  - Lawrence Steven Meyers, 67, actor (Dick Tracy, Battle Beyond the Stars) and film producer (Unfaithful) (b. 1956)
- December 6
  - Jack Hogan, 94, actor (The Legend of Tom Dooley, The Cat Burglar, Combat!) (b. 1929)
  - Ellen Holly, 92, actress (One Life to Live, Cops and Robbers, School Daze) (b. 1931)
  - Neil B. Shulman, 78, doctor and medical writer (b. 1945)
  - John Brooks Slaughter, 89, electrical engineer (National Science Foundation) (b. 1934)
  - Dave Wehrmeister, 71, baseball player (San Diego Padres, Chicago White Sox, Philadelphia Phillies) (b. 1952)
- December 7
  - Terry Baucom, 71, bluegrass singer and banjo player (Russell Moore and IIIrd Tyme Out) (b. 1952)
  - Lola Dee, 95, singer (b. 1928)
  - David Ellenson, 76, rabbi and academic administrator, president of HUC-JIR (2001–2013, 2018) (b. 1947)
  - Ken Long, 70, football player (Detroit Lions) (b. 1953)
  - Stan Rogow, 75, film and television producer (Fame, The Clan of the Cave Bear, Lizzie McGuire) (b. 1948)
  - Guy Stern, 101, German-born intelligence officer (Ritchie Boys) (b. 1922)
  - Keisha Whitaker, 51, actress and producer (b. 1972) (death announced on this date)
- December 8
  - Nidra Beard, 71, singer (Dynasty) (b. 1951/1952) (death announced on this date)
  - Frank Fiscalini, 101, politician and educator (b. 1922)
  - Ryan O'Neal, 82, actor (Love Story, Paper Moon, Barry Lyndon) (b. 1941)
  - Paul Webb, 94, college basketball coach (Randolph–Macon Yellow Jackets, Old Dominion Monarchs) (b. 1929)
- December 9
  - Anna Cardwell, 29, reality television personality (Here Comes Honey Boo Boo) (b. 1994)
  - Raymond E. Goedert, 96, Roman Catholic prelate, auxiliary bishop of Chicago (1991–2003) (b. 1927)
  - Dærick Gröss Sr., 76, illustrator (The Guide to Getting it On) and writer (b. 1946)
  - Mary Ann Handley, 87, politician (b. 1936)
  - Frank Wycheck, 52, football player (Tennessee Titans) (b. 1971)
- December 10
  - Julian Carroll, 92, politician, governor (1974–1979) and lieutenant governor (1971–1974) of Kentucky, member of the Kentucky Senate (2005–2021) (b. 1931)
  - Michael L. Cowan, 78, navy admiral (b. 1944)
  - David Drake, 78, writer (Hammer's Slammers, RCN Series) (b. 1945)
  - Mort Engelberg, 86, film producer (Smokey and the Bandit, The Hunter, The Big Easy) (b. 1937)
  - Barbara Iglewski, 85, microbiologist (b. 1938)
  - James L. Robertson, 83, jurist, justice of the Supreme Court of Mississippi (1983–1992) (b. 1940)
  - Cayle Sain, 31, drummer (Twitching Tongues) (b. 1992) (death announced on this date)
- December 11
  - Andre Braugher, 61, actor (Homicide: Life on the Street, Brooklyn Nine-Nine, Glory) (b. 1962)
  - Jeffrey Foskett, 67, singer, songwriter, and producer (The Beach Boys) (b. 1956)
  - Kenny Graham, 82, football player (San Diego Chargers, Cincinnati Bengals, Pittsburgh Steelers) (b. 1941)
  - Ken Kelsch, 76, cinematographer (The Driller Killer, Bad Lieutenant, Return to Sleepaway Camp) (b. 1947)
  - Essra Mohawk, 75, singer-songwriter ("Primordial Lovers", "Change of Heart") (b. 1948)
  - Camden Toy, 68, actor (Buffy the Vampire Slayer, Angel, The Bay) and film editor (b. 1955)
- December 12
  - Bob Allen, 86, baseball player (Cleveland Indians) (b. 1937)
  - William G. Connolly, 86, newspaper editor (The New York Times) (b. 1937)
  - Larry Miggins, 98, baseball player (St. Louis Cardinals) (b. 1925)
  - Craig Watkins, 56, lawyer and politician, district attorney for Dallas County, Texas (2007–2015) (b. 1967)
- December 13
  - Bill Burgess, 82, football player (Auburn Tigers) and coach (Jacksonville State) (b. 1941)
  - Kenny DeForest, 37, comedian (b. 1986)
  - Travis Dopp, guitarist (Small Brown Bike).
  - Julia Gentleman, 92, politician, member of the Iowa State House of Representatives (1975–1979) and Iowa State Senate (1979–1991) (b. 1931)
  - Mike Grgich, 100, Croatian-born winemaker (b. 1923)
  - Steve Junker, 88, football player (Detroit Lions, Washington Redskins) (b. 1935)
  - Roger McMurrin, 84, conductor and pastor (b. 1939)
  - Ted Morgan, 91, French-born historian (b. 1932)
  - Geraldine Peten, 75, politician, member of the Arizona House of Representatives (2017–2021) (b. 1947)
  - John Wade, 95, Olympic rower (1948) (b. 1928)
- December 14
  - Selma Archerd, 98, actress (Die Hard, Lethal Weapon, Melrose Place) (b. 1925)
  - Cari Beauchamp, 74, author, historian, journalist and documentary filmmaker (b. 1949)
  - Clyde Berry, 92, football and baseball player and coach (b. 1931)
  - Betty Cooper Hearnes, 96, politician, first lady of Missouri (1965–1973) and member of the Missouri House of Representatives (1979–1989) (b. 1927)
  - George McGinnis, 73, Hall of Fame basketball player (Indiana Pacers, Philadelphia 76ers, Denver Nuggets) (b. 1950)
  - Lee Redmond, 82, world record holder, longest fingernails on both hands (b. 1941)
  - Gus Morrison, 88, politician, mayor of Fremont, California (1985–1989, 1994–2004, 2012–2013) (b. 1934/1935)
- December 15
  - Jim Ashmore, 88, basketball player (Mississippi State Bulldogs) (b. 1935)
- December 16
  - Richard Hunt, 88, sculptor (b. 1935)
  - Scott Lautenbaugh, 59, politician, member of the Nebraska Legislature (2007–2014) (b. 1964)
  - Manny Martínez, 69, drummer (The Misfits) (b. 1954)
- December 17
  - Norma Barzman, 103, screenwriter (Never Say Goodbye, The Locket, Finishing School) (b. 1920)
  - Amp Fiddler, 65, musician (Enchantment, Parliament, Funkadelic), composer and record producer (b. 1958)
  - Jim Ladd, 75, disc jockey and radio host (b. 1948)
  - James McCaffrey, 65, actor (Rescue Me, Max Payne, Alan Wake 2) (b. 1958)
  - Eric Montross, 52, basketball player (Boston Celtics, Dallas Mavericks, Detroit Pistons) (b. 1971)
  - Gary Richards, 72, American journalist (Bay Area News Group) (b. 1951)
- December 18
  - Larry V. Faircloth, 75, politician (b. 1948) (death announced on this date)
  - Dan Greenburg, 87, writer (How to Be a Jewish Mother, The Zack Files, Maximum Boy) (b. 1936)
  - Arno J. Mayer, 97, Luxembourgish-born historian (b. 1926)
- December 19
  - Ed Budde, 83, football player (Kansas City Chiefs) (b. 1940)
  - Lyda Green, 85, politician, member (1995–2009) and president (2007–2009) of the Alaska Senate (b. 1938)
  - Bram Inscore, 41, musician (Electrocute), songwriter ("Youth", "Don't Give Up on Me") and producer (b. 1982)
- December 20
  - Carl Barzilauskas, 72, football player (New York Jets, Green Bay Packers) (b. 1951)
  - Philip H. Hayes, 83, politician, member of the Indiana House of Representatives (1975–1977) (b. 1940) (death announced on this date)
  - Frank Riggs, 73, politician and charter school executive, member of the U.S. House of Representatives (1991–1993, 1995–1999) (b. 1950)
- December 21
  - John C. Kornblum, 80, diplomat, ambassador to Germany (1997–2001) (b. 1943)
  - Paula Murphy, 95, racing driver (b. 1928)
  - David L. Norvell, 88, politician, attorney general of New Mexico (1971–1975) and member of the New Mexico House of Representatives (1962–1970) (b. 1935)
  - Ian Punnett, 63, radio broadcaster (Coast to Coast AM), author and academic (b. 1960)
  - Robert Solow, 99, economist (Solow–Swan model), Nobel Prize recipient (1987) (b. 1924)
- December 22
  - Laura Lynch, 65, musician (The Dixie Chicks) (b. 1968)
  - Ryan Minor, 49, baseball player (Baltimore Orioles) (b. 1974)
  - Ruth Seymour, 88, radio executive (KCRW) (b. 1935)
- December 23
  - Hugh Aynesworth, 92, journalist and author (b. 1931)
  - Bobbie Jean Carter, 41, television personality (House of Carters) (b. 1982)
  - Mike Nussbaum, 99, actor (Fatal Attraction, Field of Dreams, Men in Black) (b. 1923)
  - William Pope.L, 68, visual artist (b. 1955)
  - Richard Romanus, 80, actor (Mean Streets, Heavy Metal, Hey Good Lookin') (b. 1943)
- December 24
  - Cheri Barry, 68, politician, mayor of Meridian, Mississippi (2009–2013) (b. 1955)
  - Richard Bowes, 79, science fiction author (b. 1944)
  - John Cutler, 73, audio engineer (Grateful Dead) and record producer (In the Dark) (b. 1950)
  - Kamar de los Reyes, 56, actor (One Life to Live, Call of Duty: Black Ops II, Sleepy Hollow) (b. 1967)
  - Naomi Feil, 91, gerontologist (b. 1932)
  - Alice Parker, 98, composer, arranger, and choral conductor (b. 1925)
  - Willie Ruff, 92, jazz musician and educator (b. 1931)
  - Milan Zeleny, 81, Czech-born economist (b. 1942)
- December 25
  - Vinie Burrows, 99, stage actress (b. 1924)
  - David Freeman, 84, record producer (County Records) (b. 1939)
- December 26
  - James Ray, 66, basketball player (Denver Nuggets, Berloni Torino, Fenerbahçe) (b. 1957)
  - Bobby Rivers, 70, television personality (WISN-TV, WPIX, VH1) (b. 1953)
  - Tom Smothers, 86, comedian and musician (Smothers Brothers) (b. 1937)
- December 27
  - Ken Bowman, 81, football player (Green Bay Packers) (b. 1942)
  - Forestry, 27, Thoroughbred racehorse (b. 1996)
  - Michael Gibbons Jr., guitarist (Leeway)
  - Herb Kohl, 88, politician and businessman (Kohl's), member of the U.S. Senate (1989–2013) (b. 1935)
  - Ignacio E. Lozano Jr., 96, diplomat, ambassador to El Salvador (1976–1977) (b. 1927)
- December 28
  - Kelly Doran, 66, businessman and real estate developer (b. 1957)
  - Bill McColl, 93, football player (Chicago Bears) (b. 1930)
  - Herman Raucher, 95, screenwriter (Summer of '42, Class of '44, The Other Side of Midnight) (b. 1928)
  - Tommy Talton, 74, guitarist (We the People, Cowboy) (b. 1949)
  - Donald Wildmon, 85, United Methodist minister, author, and radio host, founder of the American Family Association (b. 1939)
- December 29
  - Maurice Hines, 80, actor (The Cotton Club), singer and choreographer (b. 1943)
  - Roland Leong, 78, drag racer (b. 1945)
  - Les McCann, 88, jazz pianist and singer ("Compared to What") (b. 1935)
  - Joey Meyer, 74, basketball player and coach (DePaul Blue Demons) (b. 1949)
  - Sandra Reaves-Phillips, 79, actress (Ma Rainey's Black Bottom, Round Midnight, Lean on Me), writer, and singer (b. 1944)
- December 30
  - Martha Diamond, 79, painter (b. 1944)
  - Cindy Morgan, 69, actress (Caddyshack, Tron, Galaxis) (b. 1954) (death announced on this date)
  - Douglas J. J. Peters, 60, politician, member of the Maryland Senate (2007–2021) (b. 1963)
- December 31
  - Shecky Greene, 97, comedian and actor (History of the World, Part I, Splash, Tony Rome) (b. 1926)
  - Eddie Bernice Johnson, 88, politician, member of the U.S. House of Representatives (1993–2023) and Texas Senate (1987–1993) (b. 1935)
  - Cale Yarborough, 84, Hall of Fame racing driver, founder of Cale Yarborough Motorsports and NASCAR Cup Series champion (1976, 1977, 1978) (b. 1939)
