= Deaths in November 2023 =

The following is a list of notable deaths in November 2023.

Entries for each day are listed alphabetically by surname. A typical entry lists information in the following sequence:

- Name, age, country of citizenship at birth, subsequent country of citizenship (if applicable), reason for notability, cause of death (if known), and reference.

== November 2023 ==
=== 1 ===
- Carlo Ambrosini, 69, Italian cartoonist (Ken Parker, Dylan Dog).
- Ady Barkan, 39, American political activist, complications from amyotrophic lateral sclerosis.
- Norma Berger, 90, American baseball player (Springfield Sallies).
- Luigi Berlinguer, 91, Italian politician, minister of education (1996–2000).
- Brian Brain, 83, English cricketer (Worcestershire, Gloucestershire).
- Chen Wei-ling, 48, Taiwanese film director and screenwriter (Autumn's Concerto), cervical cancer.
- Wesley P. Dahlberg, 106, American car designer.
- Irving Dardik, 87, American vascular surgeon.
- Bob Duckworth, 94, New Zealand motorcycle speedway rider (Belle Vue Aces, St Austell Gulls, Newcastle Diamonds).
- Pierre Dutour, 91, French trumpeter.
- Geaux Rocket Ride, 3, American Thoroughbred racehorse, euthanized.
- Gregor Hammerl, 81, Austrian politician, member (2010–2014, 2015–2018) and president (2012) of the Federal Council.
- Brian Hebditch, 75, British Olympic sports shooter (1976), traffic collision.
- Jonathan Hill, 65, English architect and architectural historian, cancer.
- Morgan Hout, 76, American college football coach.
- Jawaher, 45, Kuwaiti actress, cancer.
- Bob Knight, 83, American Hall of Fame basketball coach (Indiana Hoosiers, Texas Tech Red Raiders, 1984 Olympic team).
- Grégoire Lassalle, 68, French entertainer, businessman (AlloCiné) and film producer (Crash Test Aglaé, The Extraordinary Journey of the Fakir).
- Francis Mer, 84, French economist, minister of finance (2002–2004).
- Claude Michely, 64, Luxembourgish racing cyclist, heart attack.
- Eddy Monsels, 75, Surinamese Olympic sprinter (1968).
- Esther T. Mookini, 95, American linguist.
- Leela Omchery, 94, Indian classical singer and musicologist.
- Ageeda Paavel, 93, Estonian anti-Soviet activist.
- Saraswati Pradhan, 98, Indian politician, MP (1972–1978) and Odisha MLA (1961–1971).
- Jaan Rannap, 92, Estonian children's writer.
- Ann Schlee, 89, English novelist.
- Zanele Situ, 52, South African athlete, Paralympic champion (2000, 2004).
- Cláudio Strassburger, 95, Brazilian politician, federal deputy (1979–1983)
- Paride Taban, 87, South Sudanese Roman Catholic prelate, auxiliary bishop of Juba (1980–1983) and bishop of Torit (1983–2004).
- Peter Tarnoff, 86, American politician, under secretary for political affairs (1993–1997), president of the Council on Foreign Relations (1986–1993).
- Vladimir Urbanovich, 85, Russian baritone.
- Vic Vergeat, 72, Italian guitarist, singer-songwriter and record producer.
- Peter White, 86, American actor (The Boys in the Band, All My Children, Mr. Wrong), melanoma.
- Gerry Wiedel, 90, Canadian Olympic fencer (1968, 1972).
- Erich Zakowski, 89, German racing team owner (Zakspeed).

=== 2 ===
- Antonio Aranda Lomeña, 80, Spanish Roman Catholic priest, theologian and academic.
- Asashio Tarō IV, 67, Japanese sumo wrestler, small intestine cancer.
- Junior Balaiah, 70, Indian actor (Dhooram Adhighamillai, Saattai, Thani Oruvan), asphyxiated.
- Jack Bamford, 86, English George Cross recipient.
- Daisy Lee Bitter, 95, American science educator.
- Bob Bugden, 87, Australian rugby league player (St. George Dragons, Parramatta Eels, national team).
- Walter Davis, 69, American basketball player (Phoenix Suns, Denver Nuggets), Olympic champion (1976).
- Mortimer L. Downey, 87, American politician, deputy secretary of transportation (1993–2001), pulmonary fibrosis.
- Dick Drago, 78, American baseball player (Boston Red Sox, Kansas City Royals, California Angels).
- Freddy Elie, 77, Haitian-born Venezuelan football player (Deportivo Galicia, Portuguesa, Venezuela national team) and manager.
- Oussama Falouh, 24, Moroccan footballer (FUS Rabat, Angers, Wydad), injuries sustained in a traffic collision.
- Fung Ying Ki, 43, Hong Kong wheelchair fencer, Paralympic champion (2000, 2004).
- Angus Graham, 86, Scottish businessman and philanthropist.
- Salman Habaka, 33, Israeli lieutenant colonel, commander of the 188 Barak Brigade.
- John Havers, 92, English badminton player (national team).
- Humaira Himu, 37, Bangladeshi actress (Amar Bondhu Rashed), suicide by hanging.
- Natrah Ismail, 73, Malaysian politician, MP (2018–2022).
- Kaia Iva, 59, Estonian politician, MP (2007–2015), minister of social protection (2016–2019).
- Henri Korn, 89, French neuroscientist.
- Henri Lopes, 86, Congolese writer, diplomat and politician, prime minister (1973–1975).
- Jim McManus, 87, American baseball player (Kansas City Athletics).
- Larry K. Monteith, 90, American electrical engineer.
- Christopher Morley, 72, American actor (General Hospital, Freebie and the Bean, Bachelor Party).
- Jutta Müller, 94, German Hall of Fame figure skating coach.
- Michel Pilz, 78, German jazz clarinetist.
- Shin Gu-beom, 81, South Korean politician, governor of Jeju Province (1993–1995, 1995–1998).
- R. H. Sikes, 83, American professional golfer.
- Brenda Snipes, 80, American public official, supervisor of elections for Broward County, Florida (2003–2018).
- Leroy Stover, 90, American police officer.
- Yuri Temirkanov, 84, Russian conductor.
- Tom Trail, 88, American politician.
- Howard Wayne, 75, American politician, member of the California State Assembly (1996–2002).
- Wei Wei, 101, Chinese actress (Night Inn, Spring in a Small Town, The Truth About Jane and Sam).

=== 3 ===
- Adele Änggård, 90, Swedish-British stage and costume designer.
- David Berglas, 97, German-born British magician and mentalist.
- Patrick Brownsey, 75, British-born New Zealand botanist and philatelist.
- Dame Alexandra Burslem, 83, British academic and public servant.
- Robert Butler, 95, American film and television director (Batman, Star Trek, Remington Steele).
- José María Carrascal, 92, Spanish television presenter, journalist (Diario de Barcelona, La Razón) and writer.
- Gary Colson, 89, American basketball coach (Valdosta State Blazers, Pepperdine Waves, New Mexico Lobos), lymphoma.
- Bubba Copeland, 49, American politician, mayor of Smiths Station, Alabama (since 2016), suicide by gunshot.
- Zdeněk Douša, 76, Czech Olympic basketball player (1972, 1976, 1980).
- Elizângela, 68, Brazilian actress (Locomotivas, O Clone, Just Short of Perfect).
- Ian Ferrier, 68–69, Canadian poet and musician.
- Orlando Garibay, 30, Mexican racing cyclist (Cylance, Crisa–SEEI), traffic collision.
- Goutam Halder, 67, Indian actor and director, heart attack.
- Dennis Higgins, 84, American baseball player (Chicago White Sox, Washington Senators, St. Louis Cardinals).
- Francette Lazard, 86, French teacher and politician.
- Angela Marinescu, 82, Romanian poet.
- Gieve Patel, 83, Indian poet, playwright, and painter, cancer.
- Betty Reardon, 94, American teacher.
- Matti Reunamäki, 83, Finnish Olympic ice hockey player (1964, 1968).
- Govardhan Mangilal Sharma, 74, Indian politician, Maharashtra MLA (since 1995), cancer.
- Martin Shefter, 79, American political scientist and author.
- Valery Shmukler, 77, Ukrainian engineer.
- Colin Smith, 87, British-Nepali lepidopterist, gastrointestinal stromal tumor.
- Ari Tissari, 71, Finnish footballer (KTP, Vasalund, national team).
- Béla Turi-Kovács, 87, Hungarian politician, MP (since 1998).
- Priit Vesilind, 80, Estonian-American photojournalist and author.
- Zhou Tienong, 84, Chinese politician, vice chairperson of the CPPCC (1998–2008) and the Standing Committee of the NPC (2008–2013).

=== 4 ===
- Marina Cicogna, 89, Italian film producer (Belle de Jour, Investigation of a Citizen Above Suspicion), cancer.
- Karen Davis, 79, American animal rights activist.
- Robert G. Doumar, 93, American jurist, judge of the U.S. District Court of Eastern Virginia (since 1981).
- Akbar Golpayegani, 89, Iranian singer.
- L. C. Gordon, 86, American basketball player (Oklahoma State Cowboys).
- Aaron Harper, 42, American basketball player (Chorale Roanne, Levski Sofia, Ferro Carril Oeste), traffic collision.
- Kosuke Hori, 89, Japanese politician, MP (1979–2014), minister of education (1990) and internal affairs (1999–2000), aspiration pneumonia.
- Robert Knecht, 97, British historian.
- Ando Leps, 87, Estonian jurist and politician, MP (1995–2003).
- Hans Melchers, 85, Dutch businessman.
- Philip Meyer, 93, American journalist and scholar, complications from Parkinson's disease.
- Bill Milbank, 75, New Zealand art curator.
- Jean Mouton, 94, French politician, deputy (1986–1988).
- Charles Piaget, 95, French watchmaker and trade unionist.
- Cristina Quintarelli, 60, Italian Olympic swimmer (1984).
- Luigi Saidelli, 84, Italian Olympic sailor (1964), emphysema.
- Gord Smith, 86, Canadian sculptor, medically assisted death.
- Ken Timms, 85, Australian footballer (Essendon).
- Ahmad Tousi, 76, Iranian-American football manager (Sanat Naft).
- Haruo Wakō, 75, Japanese communist militant (Japanese Red Army).
- Mary Willis Walker, 81, American crime fiction author (Under the Beetle's Cellar), complications from dementia.
- John Whitney, 92, British writer and producer.
- Gary Winnick, 76, American businessman, industrialist and billionaire.

=== 5 ===
- Michael J. Alexander, 82, British translator (Beowulf), poet and broadcaster.
- Imre Bíró, 65, Romanian footballer (ASA Târgu Mureș, Universitatea Cluj, national team).
- Russell Camilleri, 86, American Olympic wrestler (1960, 1964).
- John Contoulis, 84, American football player (New York Giants).
- Ryland Davies, 80, Welsh operatic tenor and voice teacher (Royal College of Music), mesothelioma.
- Enrique Dussel, 88, Argentine-Mexican philosopher, historian and theologian, interim rector of UACM (2013–2014).
- Olaf Eliassen, 74, Norwegian farmer and politician, Sámi MP (2001–2013).
- Evan Ellingson, 35, American actor (CSI: Miami, 24, My Sister's Keeper), accidental fentanyl overdose.
- Susi Eppenberger, 92, Swiss politician, MP (1979–1991).
- David Ferry, 99, American poet, translator and educator.
- Willard F. Goodwin, 81, American politician, member of the Georgia House of Representatives (1983–1997).
- Anne Hart, 90, English actress (Z-Cars, Play of the Week).
- Harald Heckmann, 98, German musicologist (International Association of Music Libraries, Archives and Documentation Centres, Répertoire International des Sources Musicales).
- John L. Heilbron, 89, American academic and science historian.
- David Hilditch, 60, Northern Irish politician, MLA (1998–2023), cancer.
- Ole N. Hoemsnes, 95, Norwegian journalist (Morgenbladet, Morgenposten, Aftenposten), chairman of the Norwegian Union of Journalists (1966–1970).
- Donald Hunsberger, 91, American conductor (Eastman Wind Ensemble, 1965–2002), professor of conducting (Eastman School of Music) and arranger.
- Pat E. Johnson, 84, American martial artist, stuntman and actor (Enter the Dragon, The Karate Kid, Mortal Kombat).
- Juan Jumalon, 57, Filipino journalist and radio broadcaster, shot.
- Theodoros Kotsonis, 78, Greek physician and politician, MP (1989–2004).
- Malo Louarn, 74, French comic book author.
- Paolo Magnani, 96, Italian Roman Catholic prelate, bishop of Lodi (1977–1988) and Treviso (1988–2003).
- Philippe-Armand Martin, 74, French politician, deputy (1993–2017) and MEP (1994–1999).
- Ross McDonnell, 44, Irish photographer, film director and cinematographer (Colony, Elián, The First Wave).
- Jim Morrissey, 93, American politician, member of the California State Assembly (1994–1998).
- Bongi Ntuli, 32, South African footballer (Golden Arrows, Platinum Stars, AmaZulu), cancer.
- Cēzars Ozers, 86, Latvian basketball player, Olympic silver medalist (1960).
- Mike Picciotti, 66, American boxer.
- Vladimir Prifti, 81, Albanian film director and screenwriter.
- Lolita Rodrigues, 94, Brazilian singer and actress (Rainha da Sucata, Despedida de Solteiro, Kubanacan), pneumonia.
- Samuel Sanford Shapiro, 93, American statistician (Shapiro–Wilk test, Shapiro–Francia test).
- Donald Shebib, 85, Canadian film director, screenwriter and editor (Goin' Down the Road, Running Brave, The Climb).
- Ato Tolentino, 75, Filipino basketball player (Great Taste Coffee Makers) and coach (PCU Dolphins).
- Carl Torbush, 72, American college football (Ole Miss Rebels, North Carolina Tar Heels) and baseball (Southeastern Louisiana Lions) coach.
- Matt Ulrich, 41, American football player (Indianapolis Colts).
- Mitar Vasiljević, 69, Bosnian Serb convicted war criminal and paramilitary group member (White Eagles).
- William Yule, 83, British psychologist.
- Stanisław Zahradnik, 91, Polish-Czech historian.
- Xabier Zumalde, 85, Spanish Basque nationalist militant, military chief of ETA (1965–1976).

=== 6 ===
- Matevos Asatryan, 37, Armenian politician, MP (since 2019).
- Darryl Beardall, 87, American long-distance runner.
- Nadira Begum, Bangladeshi folk singer.
- Bill Dellastatious, 101, American football player (Missouri Tigers) and coach (Missouri State Bears).
- Conrado de Quiros, 72, Filipino journalist, columnist and writer.
- Ivaylo Ditchev, 68, Bulgarian anthropologist.
- John Fahy, 80, Scottish footballer (Germiston Callies, Oxford United).
- Magora Kennedy, 85, American minister and activist.
- Manu Korovulavula, 89, Fijian politician.
- Bronius Kuzmickas, 87, Lithuanian politician and philosopher, signatory of the Act of the Re-Establishment.
- Janet Landgard, 75, American actress (The Swimmer, The Donna Reed Show, Land Raider), brain cancer.
- Janko Lukovski, 77, Yugoslav and Macedonian basketball player (Rabotnički, MZT Skopje) and coach (Spartak Subotica).
- David Lund, 98, American artist.
- Roel Luynenburg, 78, Dutch rower, Olympic bronze medalist (1972).
- Vincent Marks, 93, British clinical pathologist and biochemist.
- Antoni Martí, 60, Andorran architect and politician, twice prime minister, mayor of Escaldes-Engordany (2003–2011) and general councillor (1994–2003).
- Sandy McGregor, 84, Canadian ice hockey player (New York Rangers).
- Yoshiko Miura, 74, Japanese lyricist ("Cat's Eye", "Mayonaka no Door", "Please"), pneumonia.
- Norman Munnoch, 94, Scottish rugby union player (Watsonian, Edinburgh District, national team).
- Dino Piana, 93, Italian jazz musician.
- Joe Sharkey, 77, American author and columnist.
- Neil B. Shulman, 78, American doctor and medical writer.
- Mike Shuster, 76, American journalist and blogger (NPR), complications from Parkinson's disease.
- Lars Svantesson, 90, Swedish Olympic swimmer (1952).
- Simon Sze, 87, Taiwanese-American electrical engineer (Floating-gate MOSFET).
- Roger Verplaetse, 92, Belgian racing cyclist (Faema, Flandria).
- Berend-Jan van Voorst tot Voorst, 79, Dutch politician, Queen's commissioner of Limburg (1993–2005), state secretary for defence (1989–1993) and foreign affairs (1988–1989).
- Bruno Zanoni, 71, Italian racing cyclist.

=== 7 ===
- Arputhan, 52, Indian film director (Arputham, Love Today, Manathodu Mazhaikalam), traffic collision.
- Frank Borman, 95, American astronaut (Gemini 7, Apollo 8) and airline executive (Eastern Air Lines), stroke.
- Aloisio Butonidualevu, 40, Fijian rugby union player (Auch, FC Grenoble Rugby, national team).
- Dean Byrne, 39, Irish professional boxer.
- Werner Carobbio, 86, Swiss politician, member of the National Council (1975–1999).
- D. B. Chandregowda, 87, Indian politician, MP (1971–1978, 1986–1989, 2009–2014) and three-times Karnataka MLA.
- Julius Otto Duncan, 97, American politician, member of the Texas House of Representatives (1951–1953).
- Alain Estève, 77, French rugby union player (AS Béziers, national team).
- Diethelm Ferner, 82, German football player (Werder Bremen, West Germany national team) and manager (Rot-Weiss Essen).
- Gerald Frug, 84, American legal scholar.
- Nikos Gioutsos, 81, Greek footballer (Olympiacos, Ethnikos Piraeus, national team).
- Stuart Jardine, 90, British Olympic sailor (1968, 1972).
- Bruce Sterling Jenkins, 96, American jurist and politician, judge of the U.S. District Court for the District of Utah (since 1978) and member of the Utah Senate (1959–1965).
- Igor Judge, Baron Judge, 82, English judge, lord chief justice (2008–2013).
- Maso Karipe, Papua New Guinean politician, MP (since 2022), stomach cancer.
- LaMar Lemmons Jr., 87, American politician, member of the Michigan House of Representatives (2005–2010) and businessman.
- Garfield McMahon, 91, Canadian Olympic sport shooter (1960, 1964).
- Maheswar Mohanty, 67, Indian politician, Odisha MLA (1995–2019), stroke.
- Mário Moinhos, 74, Portuguese footballer (Boavista, Benfica, national team).
- Elizabeth Moynihan, 94, American historian and writer.
- Donald Pizer, 94, American academic and literary critic.
- Betty Rollin, 87, American author and journalist, assisted suicide.
- Federico Sacchi, 87, Argentinian footballer (Racing, Newell's Old Boys, national team).
- Ken'ichi Sakemi, 59, Japanese writer (Kōkyū Shōsetsu, Bokkō).
- Albert Strickler, 68, French poet and author.
- George Sunga, 91, American television producer (The Jeffersons, Three's Company, All in the Family).
- Dev Virahsawmy, 81, Mauritian political activist, founder of Mauritian Militant Movement.
- Józef Wybieralski, 77, Polish Olympic field hockey player (1972).
- Haris Xanthoudakis, 73, Greek composer.

=== 8 ===
- Hannelore Auer, 81, Austrian singer and film actress (I'm Marrying the Director, The Merry Wives of Tyrol, ...denn die Musik und die Liebe in Tirol).
- Ziyad al-Din al-Ayyubi, 76–77, Syrian preacher and politician, minister of endowments (2004–2007).
- Marcus Besen, 99, Romanian-born Australian businessman, philanthropist and Holocaust survivor.
- Sandra Elkin, 85, American television talk show host and women's rights advocate.
- Peter Elzinga, 79, Canadian politician, MP (1974–1986) and Alberta MLA (1986–1993).
- Rainer Erler, 90, German film director and screenwriter (Fleisch, Das Blaue Palais).
- Alcides Franciscato, 94, Brazilian engineer and politician, mayor of Bauru (1969–1973), three-time deputy.
- Laurent Greilsamer, 70, French journalist and essayist, deputy director of Le Monde (2007–2011).
- Frank Houben, 84, Dutch politician, Queen's commissioner of North Brabant (1987–2003).
- Aderonke Kale, 84, Nigerian army psychiatrist (Nigerian Army Medical Corps).
- Roger Kastel, 92, American film poster artist (Jaws, The Empire Strikes Back, Doc Savage: The Man of Bronze), kidney and heart failure.
- Sawar Khan, 98, Pakistani general, vice chief of the army staff (1980–1984) and governor of Punjab (1978–1980).
- Søren Krarup, 85, Danish Lutheran pastor, author, and member of the Danish Parliament (2001–2011).
- Bernard Lemaire, 87, Canadian papermaking executive, co-founder and CEO of Cascades.
- Louis Oster, 95, French lawyer and musicologist.
- Valentina Ponomaryova, 90, Russian cosmonaut, pilot, and scientist.
- Dale Reid, 64, Scottish golfer, cancer.
- Georges Salmon, 90, Belgian long jumper and hurdler.
- Tony Thirlwall, 82, British economist.
- Giorgio Veneri, 84, Italian footballer and manager (Atalanta, AC Prato, Italy U-20).
- Jean-Pierre Verheggen, 81, Belgian writer.
- Keel Watson, 59, British opera singer.
- Adrian Webster, 72, English football player (Seattle Sounders, Colchester United) and manager (Phoenix Inferno).
- Bob White, 87, English cricketer (Middlesex, Nottinghamshire).

=== 9 ===
- Albert Alföldi, 83, Hungarian folk writer and politician, MP (1994–1998, 2004–2010).
- François Bacqué, 87, French Roman Catholic prelate, apostolic nuncio to the Netherlands (2001–2011).
- R. L. Boyce, 68, American blues musician.
- Sheila Burns, 73, American singer-songwriter (The Burns Sisters).
- Alfred L. Bush, 90, American library curator.
- Fred van Dorp, 85, Dutch Olympic water polo player (1960, 1964, 1968).
- Al Endress, 94, American football player (San Francisco 49ers).
- K. A. Francis, 75, Indian painter.
- David Gauthier, 91, Canadian-American philosopher.
- Manuel Gusmão, 77, Portuguese academic, poet and politician, member of the constituent assembly (1975–1976) and of the assembly of the republic (1975–1980).
- Kalabhavan Haneef, 63, Indian actor (Sandesam, Thenkasipattanam, Amar Akbar Anthony) and impressionist.
- Albert Heinemann, 84, German jurist and politician, member of the Landtag of Lower Saxony (1990–2003).
- Alan Hevesi, 83, American politician, comptroller of New York City (1994–2001) and New York State (2003–2006), complications from Lewy body dementia.
- Juha Leiviskä, 87, Finnish architect and designer.
- Luis Guillermo Lumbreras, 87, Peruvian archaeologist, anthropologist and academic, director of the MNAAHP (1973–1978) and president of the Museo de la Nación (1990).
- Ali Niakani, 72, Iranian footballer (Malavan, national team).
- John Nuttall, 56, British Olympic long-distance runner (1996), heart attack.
- Junko Ohashi, 73, Japanese singer, esophageal cancer.
- Kurt Olson, 75, American politician, member of the Alaska House of Representatives (2005–2017), pancreatic cancer
- Timothy O'Neill, 80, American Army officer, camouflage expert, and author (The Individuated Hobbit).
- Jørgen Reenberg, 96, Danish actor (Europa, The Wolf at the Door, I Am Dina).
- James Robertson, 95, British political activist, economist, and writer.
- John Sayre, 87, American rower, Olympic champion (1960).
- Hugh Seidman, 82–83, American poet.
- William Stoddart, 98, Scottish-Canadian physician, author and philosopher.
- Ashutosh Tandon, 63, Indian politician, Uttar Pradesh MLA (since 2014), heart failure.
- Joe Tilson, 95, British visual artist.
- John Tooby, 71, American anthropologist.
- Jim Vienneau, 97, American record producer ("It's Only Make Believe").
- Tim Woodward, 70, English actor (Wings, Piece of Cake, Families), cancer.

=== 10 ===
- Padmanabha Acharya, 92, Indian politician, governor of Nagaland (2014–2019), Tripura (2014–2015) and Assam (2014–2016).
- Danilo Astori, 83, Uruguayan economist and politician, vice president (2010–2015), minister of economy (2005–2008, 2015–2020) and twice senator, respiratory failure.
- John Bailey, 81, American cinematographer (Ordinary People, The Big Chill, Groundhog Day), president of the Academy of Motion Picture Arts and Sciences (2017–2019).
- Abraham Bergman, 91, American pediatrician.
- Max Black, 87, American politician.
- David G. Compton, 93, British author (Synthajoy, The Unsleeping Eye).
- Lorraine Day, 86, American author and orthopedic trauma surgeon.
- Miah Dennehy, 73, Irish footballer (Walsall, Bristol Rovers, national team).
- Henry Dunay, 88, American goldsmith and jewelry designer.
- Spiros Focás, 86, Greek actor (Rocco and His Brothers, The Jewel of the Nile, A Man for Burning).
- Ewan Fordyce, 70, New Zealand palaeontologist, fellow of the Royal Society of New Zealand (since 2014).
- Gordon Gibson Jr, 86, Canadian politician, British Columbia MLA (1974–1979).
- Rahman Gumbo, 59, Zimbabwean football player (Highlanders, national team) and manager (Gaborone United), heart attack.
- Mike Hamilton, 60, American athletic director (University of Tennessee), cancer.
- Hiroyuki Hosoda, 79, Japanese politician, member (since 1990) and speaker (2021–2023) of the House of Representatives and chief cabinet secretary (2004–2005).
- Charles Jordan, 69, American basketball player (Indiana Pacers, ASVEL, Fortitudo Bologna).
- Pavel Kantorek, 93, Czech Olympic runner (1956, 1960, 1964).
- Colin MacKay, 79, Scottish journalist (BBC Radio Scotland, Scottish Television).
- Pierre Michel, 93, French Olympic cyclist (1952).
- Earl T. O'Loughlin, 93, American general.
- Davide Renne, 46, Italian fashion designer (Moschino), heart attack.
- Johnny Ruffo, 35, Australian singer ("On Top") and actor (Home and Away), brain cancer.
- Marcel Schlechter, 95, Luxembourgish politician, minister for transport and public works (1984–1989), MEP (1989–1999).
- Jan Schwarz, 65, Czech theologian, Patriarch of the Czechoslovak Hussite Church (2001–2006).
- Jean-Philippe Thierry, 75, French businessman.
- Sir Eric Thomas, 70, British gynaecologist and academic administrator, vice-chancellor of the University of Bristol (2001–2015), lung cancer.
- Mihai Timofti, 75, Moldovan actor, singer, and professor.
- Penelope Walton Rogers, 73, British archaeologist.
- Yaw Shin Leong, 47, Singaporean politician, MP (2011–2012).

=== 11 ===
- Francis Agbo, 65, French Olympic high jumper (1980).
- Hammam Alloh, 36, Palestinian nephrologist, airstrike.
- Wyatt Anderson, 84, American geneticist and evolutionary biologist.
- Ron Anton, 82, Canadian Hall of Fame curler.
- Louis Belton, 79, Irish politician, TD (1989–1992, 1997–2002), and senator (1993–1997).
- Giulia Cecchettin, 22, Italian student, stabbed.
- Antonio Del Monaco, 67, Italian military officer and politician, deputy (2018–2022).
- Gema Díaz, 75, Spanish politician, senator (1995–2003) and member of the Parliament of Cantabria (1987–1995, 2003–2007).
- Raphael Dwamena, 28, Ghanaian footballer (Zürich, Egnatia, national team), ventricular arrhythmia.
- D. J. Hayden, 33, American football player (Oakland Raiders, Detroit Lions, Jacksonville Jaguars), traffic collision.
- Clarence A. Holland, 94, American politician, member of the Virginia Senate (1984–1996) and mayor of Virginia Beach (1976–1978).
- Md. Imdadul Hoque, Bangladeshi academic administrator, vice-chancellor of Jagannath University (since 2021), cancer.
- Muhammad Azam Khan, 89, Pakistani civil servant, caretaker minister of interior (2018), caretaker chief minister (since 2023) and twice chief secretary of Khyber Pakhtunkhwa.
- Kyle LeDuc, 42, American racing driver (Lucas Oil Off Road Racing Series, Championship Off-Road, Extreme E), head and neck cancer.
- Jovan Marić, 82, Serbian psychiatrist, author, and university professor.
- Chandra Mohan, 82, Indian actor (Rangula Ratnam, Padaharella Vayasu, Siri Siri Muvva), heart attack.
- Peter J. Moore, 67, Canadian record producer (Cowboy Junkies, Willie P. Bennett).
- Dimitrie Popescu, 62, Romanian rower, Olympic champion (1992).
- Kari Rahkamo, 90, Finnish Olympic athlete (1956, 1960) and politician, mayor of Helsinki (1991–1996).
- Ferario Spasov, 61, Bulgarian football player (Osam Lovech) and manager (CSKA Sofia, Montana), traffic collision.
- Dave Stenhouse, 90, American baseball player (Washington Senators).
- Rena Stewart, 100, Scottish codebreaker (Bletchley Park) and journalist.
- Nino Strano, 73, Italian politician, deputy (2001–2006) and senator (2006–2008, 2011–2012).
- Conny Van Dyke, 78, American singer and actress (Hell's Angels '69, W.W. and the Dixie Dancekings, Framed), complications from vascular dementia.
- Angelita Vargas, 77, Spanish flamenco singer and dancer, stroke.
- Masatoshi Wakabayashi, 89, Japanese politician, three-time MP, minister of the environment (2006–2007) and agriculture (2007–2008).
- Edith D. Warren, 86, American politician and educator, member of the North Carolina General Assembly (1999–2012).
- Gamini Weerakoon, Sri Lankan journalist and editor (The Sunday Leader, The Sunday Times).
- Tom Zych, 83, American politician and minister.

=== 12 ===
- Mohammed al Amin, 80, Sudanese musician.
- M. Russell Ballard, 95, American Latter-Day Saint leader, member of the Quorum of the Twelve Apostles (since 1985).
- Aldo Bet, 74, Italian footballer (Roma, Milan, national team).
- Peter J. Boylan, 87, American major general.
- Jacques Bérès, 82, French orthopedic surgeon, co-founder of Médecins Sans Frontières.
- Roman Čechmánek, 52, Czech ice hockey player (Philadelphia Flyers, Los Angeles Kings), Olympic champion (1998).
- Hugo Chamberlain, 88, Costa Rican Olympic sports shooter (1968, 1972, 1976).
- Hanna Gucwińska, 91, Polish zootechnician and politician, MP (2001–2005).
- Mustafa Hasanagić, 82, Serbian football player (Partizan, Yugoslavia national team) and manager (Ankaragücü).
- Davoud Hermidas-Bavand, 89, Iranian diplomat and political scientist.
- Rahim Huseynov, 87, Azerbaijani politician, prime minister (1992–1993).
- Joan Jara, 96, British-Chilean dancer and human rights activist.
- Erica Jen, 71, American applied mathematician.
- Rina Jimenez-David, 68, Filipino journalist (Philippine Daily Inquirer).
- Akgün Kaçmaz, 88, Turkish footballer (Fenerbahçe, national team).
- Mehmet Kakil, 56, Turkish football manager (Dynamic Herb Cebu).
- Kan, 61, Japanese singer-songwriter.
- Paul Martin Lester, 70, American professor.
- Tony Mason, 91, British Royal Air Force officer, Air Secretary (1985–1989).
- Camara Nangala, 68, Ivorian writer and teacher.
- Elinor Otto, 104, American factory worker, an original Rosie the Riveter.
- Usman Baba Pategi, 81, Nigerian actor and broadcaster.
- Helena Pilejczyk, 92, Polish speed skater, Olympic bronze medallist (1960).
- Kurt Reumann, 89, German journalist (Frankfurter Allgemeine Zeitung).
- Nina Sadur, 73, Russian writer and playwright.
- Kraft Schepke, 89, German rower, Olympic champion (1960).
- Anna Scher, 78, British-Irish drama school founder.
- Karel Schwarzenberg, 85, Czech politician, aristocrat and diplomat, senator (2004–2010), twice minister of foreign affairs and deputy (2010–2021), heart and kidney disease.
- Patrick Smith, 71, Australian sportswriter (The Age, The Australian).
- Kevin Turen, 44, American film and television producer (Euphoria, X, The Unbearable Weight of Massive Talent), heart failure.
- Hans Waldenfels, 92, German Jesuit priest, theologian, and biblist.
- Don Walsh, 92, American oceanographer, explorer, and marine policy specialist.
- Kusuma Wardhani, 59, Indonesian archer, Olympic silver medallist (1988).
- Zhong Wanxie, 89, Chinese engineer, member of the Chinese Academy of Sciences.

=== 13 ===
- Basudeb Acharia, 81, Indian politician, MP (1980–2014).
- Ociel Baena, 38, Mexican magistrate and LGBT rights activist.
- Maryanne Trump Barry, 86, American jurist and attorney, judge of the U.S. District Court of New Jersey (1983–1999) and Court of Appeals for the Third Circuit (1999–2019), cancer.
- Rob Belloir, 75, American baseball player (Atlanta Braves).
- Héctor Benavides, 82, Mexican news anchor and radio personality.
- Michael Bishop, 78, American science fiction writer (No Enemy But Time, Who Made Stevie Crye?, Brittle Innings).
- Akram Hossain Chowdhury, 68, Bangladeshi politician, MP (2008–2014).
- Michel Ciment, 85, French film critic (Positif) and historian.
- Abel Ignacio Cuevas Melo, 58, Mexican politician, deputy (2000–2003, 2006–2009).
- Mohammed Dababish, Palestinian intelligence official (Hamas), airstrike.
- Masaharu Ikuta, 88, Japanese businessman.
- Lundy Kiger, 69, American politician, member of the Oklahoma House of Representatives (2018–2020), traffic collision.
- Tengiz Kitovani, 85, Georgian politician and military commander, minister of defence (1992–1993) and leader of the Military Council (1992), co-leader of the 1991–1992 coup d'état.
- Ivo Kuusk, 86, Estonian opera singer.
- Gérard de La Martinière, 80, French businessman.
- Sjachrani Mataja, 75, Indonesian politician, MP (2014–2019).
- Ozay Mehmet, 84, Cypriot academic.
- Hoy Menear, American politician.
- Robert Philibosian, 83, American politician, Los Angeles County district attorney (1981–1984).
- Ignacio Poletti, 93, Argentine Olympic basketball player (1952).
- T. B. Silalahi, 85, Indonesian military officer, minister of public servants (1993–1998).
- Jim Traue, 91, New Zealand librarian.
- George Tscherny, 99, Hungarian-born American graphic designer and educator.
- Judith Tucker, 63, British artist and academic, traffic collision.
- Gordon Wallace, 74, Scottish footballer (Raith Rovers, Dundee United, Berwick Rangers).
- Work All Week, 14, American Throughbred racehorse, paddock accident.
- Devon Wylie, 35, American football player (Kansas City Chiefs, Tennessee Titans).

=== 14 ===
- Rick Ahearn, 74, American political consultant.
- Ken Adamson, 85, American football player (Denver Broncos).
- Sir Tom Arnold, 76, British politician, MP (1974–1997), chair of the Treasury Select Committee (1995–1996).
- Radcliffe Bailey, 54, American visual artist, brain cancer.
- Alessandra Bianchi, 59, Italian sports journalist (Corriere dello Sport, L'Équipe, Le Parisien).
- Angela Maria Bottari, 78, Italian politician, deputy (1978–1987).
- Buzy, 66, French singer.
- Ramesh Chander, 88, Malaysian economist and statistician.
- Jake Cook, 30, British racing driver, suicide.
- Brian Cotter, Baron Cotter, 87, British politician, MP (1997–2005) and member of the House of Lords (since 2006), complications from dementia.
- Shanta Das Manandhar, 89, Nepalese writer.
- Neville Garrick, 73, Jamaican graphic artist and photographer, cancer.
- Robert Koenig, 71–72, English-Polish sculptor.
- John Lachs, 89, Hungarian-born American philosopher.
- Tapfumaneyi Masaya, 51, Zimbabwean bishop, kidnap victim and political activist.
- Zbigniew Meres, 71, Polish firefighter and politician, senator (2007–2015).
- William Neill, 93, Irish Anglican priest, archdeacon of Dromore (1985–1997).
- Prithvi Raj Singh Oberoi, 94, Indian hotelier, CEO of The Oberoi Group (2002–2013).
- Arthur Parkin, 71, New Zealand field hockey player (national team), Olympic champion (1976).
- Abdelkader Retnani, 78, Moroccan editor, writer, and sporting director.
- Subrata Roy, 75, Indian conglomerate executive, founder of Sahara India Pariwar, complications from cancer, hypertension and diabetes.
- Colombo Machado Salles, 97, Brazilian engineer and politician, governor of Santa Catarina (1971–1975).
- Peter Seidler, 63, American baseball executive, chairman of San Diego Padres (since 2020).
- Arthur Simon, 93, American Lutheran minister, founder of Bread for the World.
- Terry R. Taylor, 71, American sports editor (Associated Press), cancer.
- Thelda Williams, 82, American politician, interim mayor of Phoenix (1994, 2011–2012, 2018–2019), cancer.
- Stanislav Žalud, 91, Czech architect and politician, MP (1990–1992).
- Palestinians killed in a Gaza war airstrike:
  - Ahmed Ghandour, 56, senior militant in the Izz al-Din al-Qassam Brigades of Hamas (death announced on this date)
  - Ayman Siam, senior militant in the Izz al-Din al-Qassam Brigades of Hamas (death announced on this date)
  - Ibrahim Qusaya, 31, volleyball player
  - Mohammed Shabir, 77, politician and academic administrator, president of the Islamic University of Gaza (1990–2005)

=== 15 ===
- James Jim Demoss, Car impact. Benton La (1947-2023)
- Gus Bogina, 96, American politician, member of the Kansas House of Representatives (1975–1980) and senate (1981–1995).
- George Chigova, 32, Zimbabwean footballer (Polokwane City, SuperSport United, national team), heart disease.
- Finis E. Cowan, 94, American jurist, judge of the U.S. District Court for Southern Texas (1977–1979).
- James Allan Stewart Evans, 92, Canadian historian.
- Sandy Farina, 68, American singer-songwriter and actress (Sgt. Pepper's Lonely Hearts Club Band).
- Anna Felder, 85, Swiss writer.
- Michio Fukuoka, 87, Japanese sculptor.
- Gerry Hand, 81, Australian politician, minister for Aboriginal and Torres Strait Islander affairs (1987–1990) and immigration (1990–1993) and MP (1983–1993).
- Aage Hansen, 88, Norwegian motorcycle speedway rider (Ipswich Witches).
- Frank Heffron, 87, American politician, member of the New Hampshire House of Representatives (2012–2016).
- Hans Herbjørnsrud, 85, Norwegian author.
- Daisaku Ikeda, 95, Japanese Buddhist philosopher and nuclear disarmament activist, president of Soka Gakkai (1960–1979) and Soka Gakkai International (since 1975).
- Jim Johnston, 87, American television director (Babylon 5, Tour of Duty, Miami Vice).
- Hitoshi Kimura, 89, Japanese politician, MP (1998–2010).
- Gurmeet Singh Kooner, 75, Indian politician, Rajasthan MLA (1998–2003, 2008–2013, since 2018).
- Žarko Laušević, 63, Serbian-Montenegrin actor (The Dagger, The Black Bomber, The Original of the Forgery).
- Worta McCaskill-Stevens, American physician-scientist.
- P. K. Narayanan Nambiar, 96, Indian musician.
- William R. Richardson, 94, American Army general, complications of Alzheimer's disease.
- David Rowe-Beddoe, Baron Rowe-Beddoe, 85, Welsh banker and life peer, chairman of the Wales Millennium Centre and member of the House of Lords (since 2006).
- N. Sankaraiah, 102, Indian politician, Tamil Nadu MLA (1967–1971, 1977–1984).
- Onaolapo Soleye, 90, Nigerian economist, minister of finance (1984–1985).
- Ken Squier, 88, American Hall of Fame motorsport sportscaster (NASCAR on CBS), co-founder of Motor Racing Network, complications from intestinal blockage.
- Volodymyr Stryzhevskyi, 70, Ukrainian football player (Kolos Mezhyrich, Kryvbas Kryvyi Rih) and manager (Podillya Khmelnytskyi).
- Paul Tandou, 76, Congolese footballer (CSMD Diables Noirs, CARA Brazzaville, national team).
- Karl Tremblay, 47, Canadian folk singer (Les Cowboys Fringants), prostate cancer.

=== 16 ===
- Kailash Bhansali, 82, Indian politician, Rajasthan MLA (2008–2018), lung disease.
- Thomas J. Bliley Jr., 91, American politician, member of the U.S. House of Representatives (1981–2001) and mayor of Richmond (1970–1977).
- Albert Burger, 68, German Olympic alpine skier (1976, 1980).
- Dame A. S. Byatt, 87, British author (Possession, The Virgin in the Garden, The Djinn in the Nightingale's Eye).
- Michael Chapdelaine, 67, American classical and fingerstyle guitarist.
- James Couchman, 81, British politician, MP (1983–1997).
- Ryszard Engelking, 88, Polish mathematician.
- Merle Goldman, 92, American historian and academic scholar, skin cancer.
- Ricky Graham, 77, Australian rules footballer (Geelong), prostate cancer.
- Johnny Green, 89, American basketball player (New York Knicks, Baltimore Bullets, Cincinnati Royals / Kansas City-Omaha Kings).
- Fernando Jara, 93, Chilean footballer (Universidad Católica, 1952 Olympics).
- James Paul Johnson, 93, American politician, member of the U.S. House of Representatives (1973–1981).
- Meto Jovanovski, 77, Macedonian actor (Happy New Year '49, Dust, When Day Breaks).
- Sarah Louise Keys, 95, American civil rights activist.
- Takao Kondo, 75, Japanese biologist, pneumonia.
- Ivan Korshynskyi, 95, Ukrainian doctor and politician, deputy (1994–1998).
- Hubert Mono Ndjana, 77, Cameroonian academic and philosopher, traffic collision.
- Sir Peter Newsam, 95, British educationist.
- Protectionist, 13, German Thoroughbred racehorse. (death announced on this date)
- Korney Shperling, 76, Russian football manager (Irtysh Omsk, Ural Yekaterinburg, Baltika Kaliningrad).
- Peter Solley, 75, English musician (Fox, Procol Harum) and record producer ("What I Like About You").
- Thành Được, 89, Vietnamese actor and singer.
- Bobby Ussery, 88, American Hall of Fame jockey, heart failure.
- Robert Walker, Baron Walker of Gestingthorpe, 85, British jurist, justice of the Supreme Court (2009–2013), lord of appeal in ordinary (2002–2009) and lord justice of appeal (1997–2002).

=== 17 ===
- Gohar Ayub Khan, 86, Pakistani politician, minister of foreign affairs (1997–1998) and speaker of the National Assembly (1990–1993).
- Ahmad Bahar, 74, Palestinian politician, deputy speaker of the Legislative Council (since 2006), airstrike.
- Ana Clara Benevides, 23, Brazilian university student.
- Christiane Bervoets, 75, Belgian singer ("Eviva España").
- Seóirse Bodley, 90, Irish composer.
- Ron Bryant, 76, American baseball player (San Francisco Giants, St. Louis Cardinals).
- Bob de Groot, 82, Belgian comic books artist (Chlorophylle, Clifton).
- Charlie Dominici, 72, American singer (Dream Theater, Dominici).
- Anthony Farquhar, 83, Irish Roman Catholic prelate, auxiliary bishop of Down and Connor (1983–2015).
- B. N. Goswamy, 90, Indian art critic and historian.
- H. Roger Grant, 79, American railroad historian and author.
- Zdeněk Groessl, 82, Czech volleyball player, Olympic bronze medallist (1968).
- Fikret Güler, 70, Turkish taekwondo grand master.
- Agustín Ibarrola, 93, Spanish painter and sculptor.
- Ellen Jens, 83, Dutch television producer (De Fred Haché Show, We zijn weer thuis) and director.
- Claude Kahn, 88, French pianist.
- Dennis Kemp, 92, Australian Olympic field hockey player (1956).
- Luis Larraín, 42, Chilean LGBT rights activist, blood cancer.
- Henning Munk Jensen, 76, Danish footballer (AaB, PSV Eindhoven, national team).
- Garth Norman, 84, English archdeacon.
- John C. G. Röhl, 85, British historian, prostate cancer.
- Brian Sampson, 88, Australian racing driver, Bathurst 1000 winner (1975).
- Suzanne Shepherd, 89, American actress (The Sopranos, Goodfellas, Requiem for a Dream), chronic obstructive pulmonary disease and kidney failure.
- Lou Skizas, 92, American baseball player (Kansas City Athletics, Detroit Tigers, Chicago White Sox).
- Henri Stambouli, 62, Algerian-born French football player (Monaco, Marseille) and manager (Togo national team).
- Grzegorz Stellak, 72, Polish rower, Olympic bronze medallist (1980).
- Nan Witcomb, 95, Australian poet and radio broadcaster (Cruise 1323).
- Gregory Woolley, 51, Haitian-born Canadian mobster (Hells Angels), shot.

=== 18 ===
- Akif Asgarov, 83, Azerbaijani sculptor.
- António Carvalho, 62, Portuguese football player (Vitória, national team) and manager (Caçadores das Taipas).
- Mario Castaño, 51, Colombian politician and convicted fraudster, representative (2014–2018) and senator (2018–2022), heart attack.
- James Cumberland, 90, American politician.
- David Del Tredici, 86, American composer.
- Ben Dunne, 74, Irish businessman, director of Dunnes Stores (since 1983) and founder of Ben Dunne Gyms, heart attack.
- Ruud Geels, 75, Dutch footballer (Ajax, Feyenoord, national team).
- João Lima, 62, Portuguese Olympic hurdler (1988).
- Jerome Markson, 94, Canadian architect.
- Taku Miki, 88, Japanese poet and novelist.
- Joyce Mpanga, 89, Ugandan politician, member of the Parliament of Uganda (1996–2001) and Lukiiko (since 2009), minister of state for primary education (1989–1992).
- Myitung Naw, 89, Burmese Olympic long-distance runner (1956, 1960).
- Fredrik Ohlsson, 92, Swedish actor (Pippi Longstocking, The Girl with the Dragon Tattoo).
- Ekundayo Opaleye, 77, Nigerian general and politician, governor of Ondo State (1986–1987), heart attack.
- C. L. Porinchukutty, 91, Indian artist and art educator.
- Shi Wen-long, 95, Taiwanese resin industry executive, founder of Chi Mei Corporation.
- S. Venkitaramanan, 92, Indian economist, governor of the RBI (1990–1992).
- Paul Watson, 81, British documentary filmmaker (The Family, Sylvania Waters), complications from dementia.

=== 19 ===
- Joss Ackland, 95, British actor (White Mischief, Lethal Weapon 2, The Mighty Ducks).
- Chris Alli, 78, Nigerian military officer, chief of army staff (1993–1994) and governor of Plateau State (1985–1986, 2004).
- Giuseppe Arzilli, 82, Sammarinese politician, captain regent (1986–1987, 1999–2000, 2004–2005).
- Gene Beery, 86, American painter and photographer.
- Rosalynn Carter, 96, American activist and humanitarian, first lady of the United States (1977–1981) and Georgia (1971–1975), complications from dementia.
- Roslynn Cobarrubias, 43, American television presenter, producer and speaker.
- Ninie Doniah, 56, Malagasy singer and composer.
- Sanjay Gadhvi, 57, Indian film director (Dhoom, Ajab Gazabb Love, Operation Parindey), heart attack.
- Ernesto Garzón Valdés, 96, Argentine philosopher.
- Herbert Gold, 99, American novelist.
- Catherine Christer Hennix, 75, Swedish musician, poet and philosopher.
- Marisa Jossa, 85, Italian model, Miss Italia winner (1959).
- Mushtaq Kak, 62, Indian actor (Hijack, Vishwaroopam, Dishoom) and stage director.
- Anna Kanakis, 61, Italian actress (2019, After the Fall of New York, The New Barbarians), writer and model, Miss Italia winner (1977), lymphoma.
- Wim van der Leegte, 76, Dutch manufacturing industry executive, president of VDL Groep (1972–2016).
- Marcel Lessard, 97, Canadian politician, MP (1962–1965, 1968–1980).
- Eddie Linden, 88, Scottish publisher and poet, complications from dementia.
- Phyllis Linton, 94, British Olympic swimmer (1952).
- Colette Maze, 109, French classical pianist.
- Sitiveni Moceidreke, 86, Fijian Olympic sprinter (1960). (death announced on this date)
- Carlton Pearson, 70, American minister and gospel singer, subject of Come Sunday, prostate cancer.
- Vincentius Sensi Potokota, 72, Indonesian Roman Catholic prelate, bishop of Maumere (2006–2007) and archbishop of Ende (since 2007).
- Erich Schutt, 92, German photographer.
- Noma Shepherd, 88, New Zealand community leader.
- Peter Spellos, 69, American voice actor (Transformers: Robots in Disguise, Digimon Adventure, Eagle Riders), pancreatic cancer.
- Hannes Strydom, 58, South African rugby union player (Eastern Province Elephants, Transvaal/Golden Lions, national team), world champion (1995), traffic collision.
- Mizuho Suzuki, 96, Japanese actor (The Sands of Kurobe, Battles Without Honor and Humanity: Final Episode, Never Give Up).
- Sara Tavares, 45, Portuguese singer, brain tumour.
- Guy Vattier, 84, French politician, deputy (1988).
- Wiris, 23, Brazilian footballer (Lokomotiv Plovdiv, Fluminense), traffic collision.

=== 20 ===
- Stephanie B. Alexander, 82, American mathematician.
- Background Bob, 15, British artist.
- Ana Bereciartúa, 87, Spanish politician, member of the Basque parliament (1980–1986, 1989–1990).
- Bai Bibyaon Ligkayan Bigkay, 90, Filipino Lumad rights activist.
- Anthony Boam, 91, British army officer, commander of British Forces in Hong Kong (1985–1987).
- Alberto Pinto Coelho Júnior, 78, Brazilian politician, governor of Minas Gerais (2014–2015).
- Frankie Connolly, 78, Irish footballer (Cork Hibernians, Cork Alberts).
- Josephine Cook, 92, British shot putter.
- Mike Craig, 92, Australian Olympic field hockey player (1960).
- Ramón Díaz del Río, 82, Spanish naval engineer and politician, MEP (1987–1989).
- Alice Denney, 101, American art curator, stroke.
- Filip Robar Dorin, 83, Slovenian film director and screenwriter.
- James H. Fallon, 76, American neuroscientist.
- Annabel Giles, 64, British actress (Riders, Firelight) and psychotherapist, glioblastoma.
- Zdena Hadrbolcová, 86, Czech actress (How the World Is Losing Poets, The Idiot Returns, František je děvkař).
- Preston Hanna, 69, American baseball player (Atlanta Braves, Oakland Athletics).
- Willie Hernández, 69, Puerto Rican baseball player (Detroit Tigers, Chicago Cubs), World Series champion (1984).
- Ted Hopkins, 74, Australian footballer (Carlton), businessman and writer.
- Noah Jackson, 72, American football player (Chicago Bears, Toronto Argonauts, Tampa Bay Buccaneers).
- Nina Katerli, 89, Russian writer, publicist, and human rights activist.
- Valentin Khokhryakov, 95, Russian biologist.
- Rob Krier, 85, Luxembourgish sculptor, architect, and urban designer.
- Martina Lubyová, 56, Slovak politician, minister of education (2017–2020).
- Ann Rachlin, 90, British musician and author.
- Norm Storey, 87, Australian rugby union player (national team).
- Jock Sutherland, 95, American basketball coach.
- G. T. Tallas, 79, American racing driver, glioblastoma.
- Susan Tucker, 79, American politician, member of the Massachusetts House of Representatives (1983–1991) and senate (1999–2011).
- Aman Tuleyev, 79, Russian politician, governor (1997–2018) and chairman of the council of people's deputies (1994–1996, 2018) of Kemerovo Oblast.
- John E. Walsh, 65, American political consultant and campaign manager, stomach cancer.
- Jan Westdorp, 89, Dutch racing cyclist.
- Mars Williams, 68, American saxophonist (The Waitresses, The Psychedelic Furs, Liquid Soul), ampullary cancer.

=== 21 ===
- Ron Acks, 79, American football player (Atlanta Falcons, New England Patriots, Green Bay Packers).
- Chad Allan, 80, Canadian musician (The Guess Who, Brave Belt).
- Henry E. Allee, 81, American politician, member of the Texas House of Representatives (1977–1983).
- S. S. Badrinath, 83, Indian ophthalmologist, founder of Sankara Nethralaya.
- Henri Bangou, 101, Guadeloupean politician, senator (1986–1995) and mayor of Pointe-à-Pitre (1965–2008).
- Patricia Barraclough, 72, Australian television producer, lung cancer.
- Arthur Bethell, 82, Barbadian cricketer (national team).
- Lothar Buchmann, 87, German football player (Wormatia Worms) and manager (Eintracht Frankfurt, Kickers Offenbach).
- Benjamin-Gunnar Cohrs, 58, German conductor, scholar, and music publicist, heart attack.
- Tertius Delport, 84, South African academic, lawyer and politician, MP (1999–2009).
- Aivars Endziņš, 82, Latvian jurist and politician, MP (1993–1998) and chief justice of the Constitutional Court (2000–2007).
- Saprang Kalayanamitr, 75, Thai military officer (2006 Thai coup d'état, Council for National Security), lung cancer.
- Alec Knight, 84, English Anglican priest, dean of Lincoln (1998–2006).
- Kamal Kumar, Fijian jurist, chief justice (2019–2023).
- Danutė Kvietkevičiūtė, 84, Lithuanian textile designer.
- Horacio Malvicino, 94, Argentine jazz and tango guitarist and composer.
- Anne Michel, 64, Belgian Olympic sprinter (1980).
- Bettina Moissi, 100, German stage and film (The Original Sin, Long Is the Road, The Orplid Mystery) actress.
- Francis R. Nicosia, 79, American historian.
- Paul Tịnh Nguyễn Bình Tĩnh, 93, Vietnamese Roman Catholic prelate, bishop of Đà Nẵng (2000–2006).
- Linda Parry, 78, British textiles historian and museum curator, breast cancer and pneumonia.
- Georges Perroud, 82, Swiss footballer (Sion, Servette, national team).
- James Philip, 93, American politician, member (1975–2003) and president (1993–2003) of the Illinois Senate.
- David Pytches, 92, English Anglican clergyman, bishop of Chile, Bolivia and Peru (1972–1976).
- R. Ramachandran, 71, Indian politician, Kerala MLA (2016–2021), liver disease.
- Jerónimo Saavedra, 87, Spanish politician, president of the Canary Islands (1982–1987, 1991–1993) and minister of education and science (1995–1996).
- Dale Spender, 80, Australian feminist scholar, teacher, and writer (Man Made Language, Mothers of the Novel: 100 Good Women Writers Before Jane Austen).
- Stravinsky, 27, American Thoroughbred racehorse.
- Patrick Stuart, 8th Earl Castle Stewart, 95, British hereditary peer, member of the House of Lords (1961–1999).
- P. Vatsala, 84, Indian novelist, heart failure.
- Hana Vlasáková, 75, Czech Olympic volleyball player (1968, 1972).
- Irene N. Watts, 92, German-born Canadian writer and educator.
- Dave Young, 64, American football player (New York Giants, Baltimore/Indianapolis Colts).

=== 22 ===
- Mike Bickle, 79, English footballer (Plymouth Argyle, Gillingham).
- Poseci Bune, 77, Fijian civil servant and politician, MP (1991–2006), prostate cancer.
- Mike D'Amato, 82, American football player (New York Jets).
- Tony Genato, 94, Filipino Olympic basketball player (1952, 1956).
- Santi Gutiérrez Calle, 78, Spanish footballer (Racing de Santander).
- Barbara Haščáková, 43, Slovak singer, stroke.
- Per Hedenberg, 87, Swedish Olympic rower (1960).
- Sead Jesenković, 80, Bosnian football player (Sarajevo, Famos Hrasnica, Jedinstvo Brčko) and manager.
- Jean Knight, 80, American singer ("Mr. Big Stuff").
- Emmanuel Le Roy Ladurie, 94, French historian.
- Tom Larson, 84, American sportscaster (WSBK-TV, NESN), cancer.
- Émile Martel, 82, Canadian diplomat and writer.
- François Musy, 68, Swiss-born French sound engineer (First Name: Carmen, Marguerite, Lost Illusions).
- Nguyen Qui Duc, 64–65, Vietnamese-American radio broadcaster, writer and translator, cancer.
- Sture Ohlin, 88, Swedish Olympic biathlete (1964).
- Steve Pool, 70, American television meteorologist (KOMO-TV), complications from Alzheimer's disease.
- Phil Quartararo, 67, American music industry executive.
- Christiane Rimbaud, 79, French historian.
- Jim Salestrom, 67, American singer-songwriter.
- Linda Salzman Sagan, 83, American artist and writer.
- Rutger Stuffken, 76, Dutch Olympic rower (1972).
- Óscar Felipe Ventura, 80, Peruvian academic and politician, deputy (1985–1990).
- Herbert Weiz, 99, German politician, minister of science and technology (1962–1966, 1974–?) and deputy chairman of the Council of Ministers (1967–1989).

=== 23 ===
- Absolute Andy, 40, German professional wrestler (wXw).
- Fathima Beevi, 96, Indian jurist, judge of the Supreme Court (1989–1992) and governor of Tamil Nadu (1997–2001).
- Jim Carter, 75, American football player (Green Bay Packers).
- Anan Chaisaeng, 96, Thai politician, MP (1969–1976, 1983–1986, 2001–2005).
- Ánchel Conte, 81, Spanish writer and poet.
- Pat Gibson, 81, British cricket journalist.
- Rona Hartner, 50, Romanian actress (The Crazy Stranger, Time of the Wolf, Le Divorce), singer and painter, lung and brain cancer.
- Harald Hasselbach, 56, Dutch football player (Calgary Stampeders, Denver Broncos), Super Bowl champion (1997, 1998), mucinous adenocarcinoma.
- Glyn Hopkins, 95, Welsh Olympic gymnast.
- Gabe Hudson, 52, American author (Gork, the Teenage Dragon), complications from diabetes and kidney disease.
- Steve Jurczyk, 61, American engineer, acting administrator of NASA (2021), pancreatic cancer.
- Mark Kellar, 71, American football player (Minnesota Vikings, San Antonio Wings, Chicago Fire).
- Francisco Luna Kan, 97, Mexican politician, governor of Yucatán (1976–1982) and deputy (1964–1967).
- Antoni Marí Calbet, 91, Spanish doctor and politician, member of the Parliament of the Balearic Islands (1983–2003).
- Rubens Minelli, 94, Brazilian football manager (Internacional, São Paulo, Saudi Arabia national team), infection.
- Russell Norman, 57, English cook, restaurateur and author (Saturday Kitchen).
- Tom Pauling, 76, Australian lawyer, administrator of the Northern Territory (2007–2011).
- Charles Peters, 96, American journalist (Washington Monthly).
- Guy Armand Romano, 86, French Roman Catholic prelate, apostolic administrator of Niamey (1984–1997) and bishop of Niamey (1997–2003).
- Michael J. Shannon, 80, American actor and playwright.
- Paul Sait, 76, Australian rugby league player (South Sydney, national team) and coach.
- Greg "Fingers" Taylor, 71, American harmonica player, complications from Alzheimer's disease.
- Steve Voce, 89, British journalist and music critic.

=== 24 ===
- Alfredo Adum, 71, Ecuadorian lawyer and politician, deputy (1988–1990), minister of energy (1996–1997).
- Douglas Ahlstedt, 78, American operatic tenor (Metropolitan Opera).
- Keith Beckwith, 84, Australian footballer (Collingwood).
- Derek John Blundell, 90, British geologist.
- Camilo Cascolan, 59, Filipino police officer, chief of the national police (2020).
- George Cohon, 86, American-born Canadian fast food executive, founder of McDonald's Canada and McDonald's Russia.
- Bruno Fagnoul, 87, Belgian politician, minister-president of the German-speaking community (1984–1986).
- Rod Fletcher, 78, English footballer (Scunthorpe United, Lincoln City, Grimsby Town).
- Jukka Haavisto, 93, Finnish musician.
- František X. Halas, 86, Czech historian of Christianity, academic and diplomat.
- Ron Hodges, 74, American baseball player (New York Mets).
- Shizuka Ijūin, 73, Japanese writer and lyricist.
- Herb Klein, 93, American politician, member of the U.S. House of Representatives (1993–1995).
- Rajkumar Kohli, 93, Indian film director (Nagin, Jaani Dushman, Raaj Tilak), heart attack.
- Avraham Menchel, 87, Israeli footballer (Maccabi Haifa, national team).
- Chris Parr, 80, British theatre director, television producer (Takin' Over the Asylum) and executive (BBC Birmingham), pneumonia.
- Elliot Silverstein, 96, American film and television director (Cat Ballou, A Man Called Horse, The Car).
- Chris Stone, 64, Australian footballer (St Kilda), brain cancer.
- Henry Tilly, 91, English cricketer (Middlesex, MCC, Hertfordshire).
- Heidelinde Weis, 83, Austrian actress (I'm Marrying the Director, Don't Tell Me Any Stories, Aunt Frieda).
- Derek Wilford, 90, British military officer, complications from Parkinson's disease.

=== 25 ===
- Douglas D. Alder, 91, American historian and academic administrator, president of Utah Tech University (1986–1993), complications from Parkinson's disease.
- Whitney Anderson, 91, American politician and businessman.
- Robert Hart Baker, 69, American classical conductor and music director.
- Jean-Marc Brûlé, 58, French politician, member of the Regional Council of Île-de-France (2004–2015).
- Gérard Collomb, 76, French politician, senator (1999–2017, 2018), minister of the interior (2017–2018), and twice mayor of Lyon, stomach cancer.
- Jean-Claude Cornu, 85, French Olympic sailor (1960).
- Maurizio Creuso, 80, Italian politician, senator (1992–1994).
- Bita Farrahi, 65, Iranian actress (Hamoun, A House Built on Water, Island), heart and lung disease.
- Larry Fink, 82, American photographer.
- Ivan Havlíček, 78, Czech physicist, academic and senator (1996–2000).
- Tras Honan, 93, Irish politician, senator (1977–1992) and cathaoirleach (1982–1983, 1987–1989).
- Clarke Ingram, 66, American radio personality (WPXY, WZUM, WKHB).
- Daryl Johnson, 77, American football player (Boston Patriots).
- Papi Khomane, 48, South African footballer (Jomo Cosmos, Orlando Pirates, national team), traffic collision.
- Marty Krofft, 86, Canadian puppeteer (H.R. Pufnstuf, Land of the Lost, Sigmund and the Sea Monsters), kidney failure.
- Aldo Lado, 88, Italian film director (Short Night of Glass Dolls, Who Saw Her Die?, The Humanoid), screenwriter and author.
- Luwellyn Landers, South African politician. (death announced on this date)
- Martin Lockley, 73, Welsh palaeontologist, cancer.
- Les Maguire, 81, English musician (Gerry and the Pacemakers).
- Jorge Martín Montenegro, 40, Argentine-Spanish racing cyclist.
- Fabio Martínez Castilla, 73, Mexican Roman Catholic prelate, bishop of Ciudad Lázaro Cárdenas (2007–2013) and archbishop of Tuxtla (since 2013), ischemic crisis and neoplasm.
- Leila Mustafa, 35, Syrian politician, co-chair of the civil council of Raqqa (2017–2022), complications during surgery.
- Leo Narducci, 91, American fashion designer.
- Yngvar Numme, 79, Norwegian singer (Dizzie Tunes) and actor.
- Alfredo Prieto Valiente, 89, Spanish businessman and politician, deputy (1977–1982).
- B. Sasikumar, 74, Indian violinist.
- Volodymyr Shapoval, 89, Ukrainian politician, deputy (1990–1994).
- Terry Venables, 80, English football player (Chelsea, Tottenham Hotspur) and manager (national team).
- Alex J. Walling, 75, Canadian sports analyst and broadcaster.
- Ursula Bethell, Baroness Westbury, 99, British noblewoman and philanthropist.
- Layachi Yaker, 93, Algerian diplomat and politician, secretary-general of the United Nations Economic Commission for Africa (1992–1995).

=== 26 ===
- Papa Arko, Ghanaian footballer (Asante Kotoko, national team).
- Maurie Considine, 91, Australian footballer (Hawthorn).
- Alberto da Costa e Silva, 92, Brazilian historian, poet, and diplomat.
- Theodore J. Cusson, 87, American politician, member of the New Hampshire House of Representatives (1986–1988).
- Tim Dorsey, 62, American novelist (Florida Roadkill, Hammerhead Ranch Motel, Orange Crush).
- Enzo Erminero, 92, Italian businessman and politician, deputy (1968–1983), mayor of Verona (1993).
- Brian Godding, 78, Welsh jazz rock guitarist (Blossom Toes, Centipede).
- Pablo Guzmán, 73, American television journalist (WCBS-TV).
- Magda Hollander-Lafon, 96, Hungarian-born French Holocaust survivor and psychologist.
- Rudy Insanally, 87, Guyanese diplomat, minister of foreign affairs (2001–2008) and president of the United Nations General Assembly (1993–1994).
- Norman Irons, 82, Scottish councillor and honorary consul, lord provost of Edinburgh (1992–1996).
- Péter Kozma, 62, Hungarian Olympic skier (1984).
- Norris McDonald, 81, Canadian journalist (Toronto Star, The Globe and Mail).
- Robert Precht, 93, American film and television (The Ed Sullivan Show) producer.
- Michel Roumégoux, 75, French veterinarian and politician, deputy (2002–2007).
- Rodolfo Stange, 98, Chilean police officer and politician, senator (1998–2005) and member of the government junta (1985–1990).
- Don Tannas, 85, Canadian politician, Alberta MLA (1989–2004).
- Geordie Walker, 64, English guitarist (Killing Joke) and songwriter ("Love Like Blood", "Eighties"), complications from a stroke.
- Siegfried Wustrow, 87, German cyclist.

=== 27 ===
- Bob Albright, 87, American politician, member of the Alabama House of Representatives (1974–1986).
- William Anastasi, 90, American conceptual artist.
- Maria Barmich, 89, Russian linguist, stroke.
- Henk Buck, 93, Dutch organic chemist.
- Susan Catania, 81, American politician, member of the Illinois House of Representatives (1973–1983).
- Roger Chaussabel, 91, French racing cyclist.
- Mary L. Cleave, 76, American astronaut (STS-61-B, STS-30).
- Mike Corkins, 77, American baseball player (San Diego Padres).
- Heinz Dürr, 90, German businessman, chairman of AEG (1980–1990) and Deutsche Bahn (1994–1997).
- Alessandro Figà Talamanca, 85, Italian mathematician.
- Jim Heron, 83, Canadian politician.
- Paweł Huelle, 66, Polish writer.
- Pim Jungerius, 90, Dutch physical geographer.
- Victor J. Kemper, 96, American cinematographer (Dog Day Afternoon, National Lampoon's Vacation, The Last Tycoon).
- Helen Lucas, 92, Canadian artist.
- Parvaneh Massoumi, 78, Iranian actress (Reverse, Downpour, Prophet Joseph).
- Zaverilal Mehta, 96, Indian photographer.
- John Nichols, 83, American novelist (The Sterile Cuckoo, The Wizard of Loneliness, The Milagro Beanfield War).
- Ibrahim Oweiss, 92, Egyptian-born American economist.
- Wanderley Paiva, 77, Brazilian football player (Atlético Mineiro, national team) and manager (Ponte Preta, CRAC), prostate cancer.
- Mohy Quandour, 85, Jordanian author and film producer (A Facebook Romance).
- Reggie Redding, 55, American football player (Atlanta Falcons, New England Patriots).
- Edward G. Smith, 62, American jurist, judge of the U.S. District Court for Eastern Pennsylvania (since 2014).
- William Michael Stankewicz, 78, American teacher and convicted attempted murderer.
- Frances Sternhagen, 93, American actress (Equus, ER, Misery), Tony winner (1974, 1995).
- Dalia Teišerskytė, 79, Lithuanian politician, journalist and poet, MP (2000–2016).
- Mihály András Vajda, 88, Hungarian philosopher.

=== 28 ===
- Jack Axelrod, 93, American actor.
- Julius W. Becton Jr., 97, American military officer, director of FEMA (1985–1989).
- Mark Candon, 71, American politician, member of the Vermont House of Representatives, traffic collision.
- Queenzy Cheng, 37, Malaysian actress and singer.
- George Chin, 94, Canadian ice hockey player (Michigan Wolverines, Chatham Maroons, Nottingham Panthers).
- John Colianni, 61, American jazz pianist.
- Josip Čorak, 80, Croatian wrestler, Olympic silver medallist (1972).
- Agyemang Diawusie, 25, German footballer (Dynamo Dresden, Wehen Wiesbaden, Jahn Regensburg).
- Dan Dobbek, 88, American baseball player (Washington Senators/Minnesota Twins), heart failure.
- James Douglas-Hamilton, Baron Selkirk of Douglas, 81, Scottish politician, MP (1974–1997), MSP (1999–2007) and member of the House of Lords (1997–2023), pneumonia.
- Lanny Gordin, 72, Brazilian guitarist and composer.
- Mali, Sri Lankan-born Asian elephant (Manila Zoo).
- Martin Mate, 94, Canadian Anglican priest, bishop of Eastern Newfoundland and Labrador (1980–1992).
- Máire Mulcahy, 85–86, Irish zoologist and ecologist.
- Charlie Munger, 99, American investor, vice chairman of Berkshire Hathaway (since 1978) and chairman of Wesco Financial (1984–2011).
- Antonis Parayios, 94, Greek footballer (AEK Athens, national team).
- Eugenijus Petrovas, 87, Lithuanian politician, signatory of the act of re-establishment.
- Jessie T. Pettway, 94, American artist.
- Allan Rogers, 91, British politician, MP (1983–2001) and MEP (1979–1984).
- Richard Rydze, 73, American diver, Olympic silver medalist (1972).
- Cecil Sandford, 95, British motorcycle road racer, Grand Prix World Riders' Champion (1952, 1957).
- Leighton W. Smith Jr., 84, American navy admiral, commander of United States Naval Forces Europe (1994–1996), complications from Parkinson's disease.

=== 29 ===
- Charles Gilchrist Adams, 86, American Baptist minister, pneumonia.
- Luis Bates, 89, Chilean lawyer and politician, minister of justice (2003–2006).
- Richard L. Berkley, 92, American politician, mayor of Kansas City, Missouri (1979–1991).
- Colin Buchanan, 89, British Anglican bishop and academic.
- Frank Corrigan, 71, English footballer (Wigan Athletic).
- Elliott Erwitt, 95, French-born American photographer.
- Rolf Geiger, 89, German footballer (Stuttgarter Kickers, VfB Stuttgart, national team).
- Roman Hodovanyi, 33, Ukrainian footballer (Nyva Ternopil, Volyn Lutsk, Slavia Mozyr).
- Scott Kempner, 69, American guitarist (The Dictators, The Del-Lords, The Brandos), complications from dementia.
- Irene Kerwin, 98, American baseball player (Peoria Redwings).
- Henry Kissinger, 100, German-born American diplomat and politician, national security advisor (1969–1975), secretary of state (1973–1977) and Nobel Prize laureate (1973), heart failure.
- Darcy McKeough, 90, Canadian politician, Ontario MPP (1963–1978), treasurer of Ontario (1971–1972, 1975–1978), pneumonia.
- Mildred Miller, 98, American mezzo-soprano.
- Yasuhiro Noguchi, 77, Japanese volleyball player, Olympic champion (1972), kidney failure.
- Michael Oleksa, 76, American Russian Orthodox priest, linguist, and writer, stroke.
- David Ratnavale, 95, Sri Lankan-born American psychiatrist.
- Michèle Rivasi, 70, French politician, MEP (since 2009), heart attack.
- Dean Sullivan, 68, English actor (Brookside), prostate cancer.
- John A. Talbott, 88, American psychiatrist.
- Sticky Vicky, 80, Spanish dancer and illusionist (Benidorm).
- Ulla-Britt Wieslander, 81, Swedish Olympic sprinter (1960, 1964, 1968).
- Taichi Yamada, 89, Japanese screenwriter (Childhood Days) and novelist (Strangers, In Search of a Distant Voice).

=== 30 ===
- Sophie Anderson, 36, English pornographic actress and internet personality (Slag Wars: The Next Destroyer), suicide by GHB overdose.
- Shlomo Avineri, 90, Israeli political scientist.
- Joan Botam, 97, Spanish Roman Catholic priest and political dissident.
- Rolf Wilhelm Brednich, 88, German Europeanist ethnologist, ethnographer and folklorist.
- John Bryant, 93, American Olympic sailor.
- John Byrne, 83, Scottish playwright (The Slab Boys Trilogy, Tutti Frutti, Your Cheatin' Heart) and designer.
- José Catieau, 77, French road bicycle racer (Pelforth–Sauvage–Lejeune, Bic, Peugeot).
- Alistair Darling, Baron Darling of Roulanish, 70, British politician, chancellor of the Exchequer (2007–2010), MP (1987–2015) and member of the House of Lords (2015–2020), cancer.
- Bolesław Fleszar, 89, Polish chemist and politician, senator (1989–1991).
- Sante Gaiardoni, 84, Italian cyclist, double Olympic champion (1960).
- Oleksandr Kalynychenko, Russian canoer.
- Vladimir Lebedev, 61, Russian politician, senator (since 2014), stroke.
- Shane MacGowan, 65, English-born Irish singer (The Pogues, Shane MacGowan and the Popes) and songwriter ("Fairytale of New York"), pneumonia and encephalitis.
- Mikhail Marov, 90, Russian astronomer.
- Viktor Mikhailov, 87, Russian politician, governor of Magadan Oblast (1991–1996).
- William P. Murphy Jr., 100, American physician and inventor.
- Jan Plamper, 53, German professor of history (University of Limerick).
- Luis Antonio Rivera, 93, Puerto Rican comedian, heart disease.
- Mamdouh bin Abdulaziz Al Saud, 83, Saudi royal and politician, governor of Tabuk Province (1986–1987).
- Paul Snyder, 88, American baseball executive (Atlanta Braves).
- Subbalakshmi, 87, Indian actress (Kalyanaraman, Pandippada, Nandanam), composer and singer.
- Vassilis Vassilikos, 89, Greek writer (Z) and diplomat, MP (2019–2023).
- Dominic Welsh, 85, English mathematician.
- Edwin Yoder, 89, American journalist.
