= Petrovas =

Petrovas is a Lithuanian surname. Notable people with the surname include:

- Andrius Petrovas (born 1972), Lithuanian equestrian
- Eugenijus Petrovas (1936–2023), Lithuanian politician
