= Jawaher =

Kuwaiti actress (1977–2023)

- Born: Manal Misfer Hajaj Misfer; 4 November 1977
- Died: 1 November 2023 (aged 45)
- Occupation: Actress
- Years active: 1990–2018

Manal Al Mesfer (4 November 1977 – 1 November 2023), better known as Jawaher (Arabic: جواهر) was a Kuwaiti actress.

== Career ==
Jawaher's first acting role was in a children's play, The Bat. In the late 1990s, she acted in four television series, before retreating from acting for several years. She acted again from 2003 to 2005, and from 2010 until 2018.

== Personal life and death ==
In February 2020, Jawaher announced that she had been diagnosed with stomach cancer. She sought treatment in London before returning to Kuwait in late 2023. Jawaher died from cancer on 1 November 2023 at the age of 45.
