= Santi Gutiérrez Calle =

Spanish footballer (1945–2023)

Personal information
- Full name: Santiago Gutiérrez Calle
- Date of birth: 15 August 1945
- Place of birth: Laredo, Spain
- Date of death: 22 November 2023 (aged 78)
- Place of death: Santander, Spain
- Height: 1.76 m (5 ft 9 in)
- Position: Defender

Youth career
- Laredo

Senior career*
Years	Team	Apps	(Gls)
1964–1969	Rayo Cantabria		
1969–1977	Racing de Santander	143	(3)
- * Club domestic league appearances and goals

Santiago Gutiérrez Calle (15 August 1945 – 22 November 2023) was a Spanish professional footballer who played as a defender.

== Career ==
Born in Laredo, Gutiérrez Calle spent his early career with Laredo and Rayo Cantabria. He then played for Racing de Santander, retiring in 1977 following an Achilles injury, having made 191 appearances for the club. He then became a coach with the club, remaining until his retirement in 2007. A training pitch at Racing's facility was named after him in 2021.

== Death ==
Gutiérrez Calle died in Santander on 22 November 2023, at the age of 78.
