= Willard F. Goodwin =

American politician (1942–2023)

Member of the Georgia House of Representatives
- In office 1983–1997

Personal details
- Born: March 20, 1942 Kings County, New York, U.S.
- Died: November 5, 2023 (aged 81)
- Party: Republican
- Education: Adelphi University; Atlanta Law School

Willard F. Goodwin (March 20, 1942 – November 5, 2023) was an American politician. He served as a Republican member of the Georgia House of Representatives.

== Life and career ==
Goodwin was born in Kings County, New York. He attended Adelphi University and Atlanta Law School.

Goodwin served in the Georgia House of Representatives from 1983 to 1997.

Goodwin died on November 5, 2023, at the age of 81.
