= Pim Jungerius =

Dutch physical geographer (1933–2023)

Pieter Dirk "Pim" Jungerius (10 June 1933 – 27 November 2023) was a Dutch physical geographer. He was a professor of physical geography, climatology and cartography at the University of Amsterdam between 1970 and 1998.

== Life and career ==
Pieter Dirk Jungerius was born on 10 June 1933 in Rijnsburg. He started studying in 1951 and obtained a degree in physical geography at the University of Amsterdam in 1957. Jungerius obtained his doctorate in physical geography in 1959 at the same university under Jan Pieter Bakker with a thesis titled: Zur Verwitterung, Bodenbildung und Morphologie der Keuper-Liaslandschaft bei Moutfort in Luxembourg. He was lector of general physical geography and physical landscape geography at the University of Amsterdam between 1963 and 1970. He subsequently was a professor of physical geography, climatology and cartography between 1970 and his retirement in 1998.

In his research Jungerius made links to geomorphology, soil science as well as social geography. Jungerius performed significant research into dune systems and the formation of cuesta. He was in part responsible for the reintroduction of aeolian processes in the Dutch dunes. In 2012 he contributed to a large publication on earthen walls by the Rijksdienst voor het Cultureel Erfgoed. Jungerius was a proponent of introducing legal protection for geological heritage. He was a long-time editor of Earth Surface Processes and Catena.

Jungerius was elected a member of the Royal Netherlands Academy of Arts and Sciences in 1987.

Jungerius died in Bennekom on 27 November 2023, at the age of 90.
