= Antonio Aranda Lomeña =

Spanish Roman Catholic priest (1942–2023)

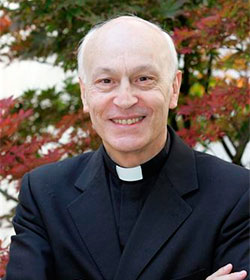
Antonio Aranda Lomeña

Antonio Aranda Lomeña (22 December 1942, Córdoba – 2 November 2023) was a Spanish Roman Catholic priest, theologian, and academic.

== Publications ==
- A imagen de Dios en Cristo: cuestiones de antropología teológica, Pamplona, Eunsa, 2023, 411 pp. ISBN 978-84-313-3847-3
- El hecho teológico y pastoral del Opus Dei: Una indagación en las fuentes fundacionales, Pamplona, Eunsa, 2020, 1ª, 369 pp. ISBN 978-84-313-3492-5 (2021, 2ª, 369 pp. ISBN 978-84-313-3611-0).
- Amigos de Dios. Edición crítico-histórica preparada por Antonio Aranda, Madrid, Rialp, 2019, [35ª] (1ª ed. crítico-histórica), LII, 955 pp. ISBN 978-84-321-5105-7
- Es Cristo que pasa. Edición crítico-histórica preparada por Antonio Aranda, Madrid, Rialp, 2013, 45ª (1ª ed. crítico-histórica), XLI, 1033 pp., ISBN 978-84-321-4330-4 2º ed., 2013, 46ª [2ª ed. crítico-histórica], XLI, 1033 pp. ISBN 978-84-321-4317-5
- Dios busca al hombre: Curso Internacional de Actualización Teológica, Lima, CDSCO, 2013, 247 pp.
- Creemos y conocemos. Lectura teológica del catecismo de la Iglesia Católica: Lectura teológica del Catecismo de la Iglesia Católica, Pamplona, Eunsa, 2012. ISBN 978-84-313-4995-0
- María, camino de retorno: Nueva evangelización y piedad mariana, Pamplona, Eunsa, 2012. ISBN 84-313-4972-7
- Identidad cristiana: coloquios universitarios, Pamplona, Eunsa, 2007. ISBN 978-84-313-2499-5 Traducido al italiano: Identità cristiana: i fondamenti, Roma, Edizioni Università della Santa Croce, 2007, 1ª, 400 pp. ISBN 978-88-8333-121-3
- «El bullir de la sangre de Cristo»: estudio sobre el cristocentrismo del beato Josemaría Escrivá, Madrid, Rialp, 2000, 1ª, 304 pp. ISBN 84-321-3283-7 Traducido al italiano: «Vedo scorrere in voi il sangue di Cristo». Studio sul cristocentrismo di san Josemaría Escrivá, Roma, Edizioni Università della Santa Croce, 2003, 1ª ed. italiana, 263 pp. ISBN 8883330374.
- La lógica de la unidad de vida. Identidad cristiana en una sociedad pluralista, Pamplona, Eunsa, 2000, 1ª, 224 pp. ISBN 978-84-313-1797-3
