= Camara Nangala =

Ivorian writer and teacher (1955–2023)

- Born: 10 November 1955; Katiola, French Ivory Coast, French West Africa
- Died: 12 November 2023 (aged 68)
- Occupations: Writer; Teacher

Camara Nangala (10 November 1955 – 12 November 2023) was an Ivorian writer and teacher.

== Biography ==
Born in Katiola on 10 November 1955, Nangala studied electronics and telecommunications and became a professor of mathematics and physical science. He also taught general secondary education in Abidjan. Alongside this salaried job, he wrote books of poetry, novels, and youth works. In 1989 and 1999, he was awarded the prize Raconte-moi une histoire et Une histoire pour l'an 2000, organized by the Centre d'édition et de diffusion africaines in Abidjan. Throughout his career, he was considered one of the most prolific Ivorian writers.

Camara Nangala died on 12 November 2023, at the age of 68.

== Books ==
- Le cahier noir (1994)
- La poupée (1998)
- Le printemps de la liberté (1999)
- La fille au grand cœur (2000)
- Le messager (2000)
- La ronde des hyènes (2000)
- Histoire de fous (2003)
- Le médaillon magique (2003)
- L'autre versant (2004)
- Un papy sympa (2004)
- La dernière chance (2005)
- Princesse Ebla (2006)
- Zaouli (2012)
- Procès dans les entrailles de la terre (2017)
- Avec le temps: l'enfant qui va naître gaucher (2021)
