= Kurt Reumann =

German journalist (1934–2023)

- Born: 24 September 1934; Wesselburen, Germany
- Died: 12 November 2023 (aged 89); Eschborn, Hesse, Germany
- Education: Free University of Berlin
- Occupation: Journalist

Kurt Reumann (24 September 1934 – 12 November 2023) was a German journalist.

== Biography ==
Born in Wesselburen on 24 September 1934, Reumann earned money during a two-year apprenticeship at the Holsteinischen Courier. He then studied journalism, German, art history, and political science at the Free University of Berlin. In 1964, he drew political cartoons under Emil Dovifat, for whom he was an assistant from 1963 to 1965. He then did opinion research for Elisabeth Noelle-Neumann at the Allensbach Institute and at the University of Mainz.

In 1970, Reumann joined the editorial team of Frankfurter Allgemeine Zeitung, responsible for publishing reports on education policy, particularly for universities. He also conducted survey research using psephology. In 1992, he wrote the volume Lesefreuden und Lebenswelten within the "Texte + Thesen". From 1995 to 2004, he was deputy chairman of the board of trustees of the University of Music Franz Liszt Weimar. In 2008, he joined the Academy of Science for Public Utility. Throughout his career, he worked extensively on spelling reform.

Kurt Reumann died in Eschborn on 12 November 2023, at the age of 89.

== Works ==
- Das antithetische Kampfbild (1964)
- Waffengleichheit in der Gegendarstellung (1971)
- Blick ins Innere, Berichte von der akademischen Front (1975)
- Öffentliche Meinung und sozialer Wandel. Public Opinion and Social Change (1981)
- Öffentliche Meinung und sozialer Wandel (1982)
- Jugend heute: Aufbruch oder Aufstand? (1982)
- Gibt es den Fallbeil-Effekt für die kleinen Parteien? (1983)
- Lesefreuden und Lebenswelten (1992)
- Wider das tödliche Amüsement (1992)
- Die Kultusminister gehen nicht unter (1998)
- Die Reform als Diktat. Zur Auseinandersetzung über die deutsche Rechtschreibung (2000)
