= Pat Gibson (journalist) =

British cricket journalist

John Patrick Gibson (24 March 1942 – 23 November 2023) was a British cricket journalist.

== Early life and education ==
Born in South Ferriby, Lincolnshire, Gibson was the son of Sydney Gibson, a clerk who served in the World War II, and Dorothy, a nurse. He was educated at Barton-upon-Humber Grammar School and was a supporter of Grimsby Town F.C. and rugby, though his primary interest was cricket.

== Career ==
Gibson began his career at the Nottingham Evening Telegraph, where he met his wife, Enid Bennett, in 1958. They married in 1965 and had a son, Sean.

Gibson covered notable events in cricket, including the arrival of Garfield Sobers at Trent Bridge and the performances of Ian Botham. He served as the cricket correspondent for the Daily Express from 1975 to 1987 and for the Sunday Express from 1987 to 1994. Gibson later worked for The Times from 1994 until his retirement in 2016. He also served as the chairman of the Cricket Writers' Club from 2008 to 2014.
