= Norm Storey =

Australian rugby union player (1936–2023)

- Full name: Norman John David Storey
- Born: 6 October 1936 Sydney, Australia
- Died: 20 November 2023 (aged 87)

Rugby union career
- Position: Fly-half
International career
Years	Team	Apps	(Points)
1962	Australia	1	(0)

Norman John David Storey (6 October 1936 — 20 November 2023) was an Australian rugby union international.

A Scots College product, Storey debuted in first-grade for Eastern Suburbs while still a schoolboy.

Storey's first ever representative match in 1958 was for South Australia, one of several players brought in as the team had been impacted by the influenza pandemic. It wasn't until 1962 that he appeared for his actual state, playing at fly-half in New South Wales' upset victory over the touring All Blacks. For his part in the win, Storey was called up by the Wallabies for the 1st Test in Brisbane, which they lost 6–20. He was surprisingly discarded from the team for the 2nd Test.

== See also ==
- List of Australia national rugby union players
