= Gema Díaz =

Spanish politician (1948–2023)

Gema Díaz (10 July 1948 – 11 November 2023) was a Spanish politician. She was a senator from 1995 to 2003 and member of the Parliament of Cantabria from 1987 to 1995 and from 2003 to 2007. Díaz died on 11 November 2023, at the age of 75.
