= Theodoros Kotsonis =

Greek politician (1945–2023)

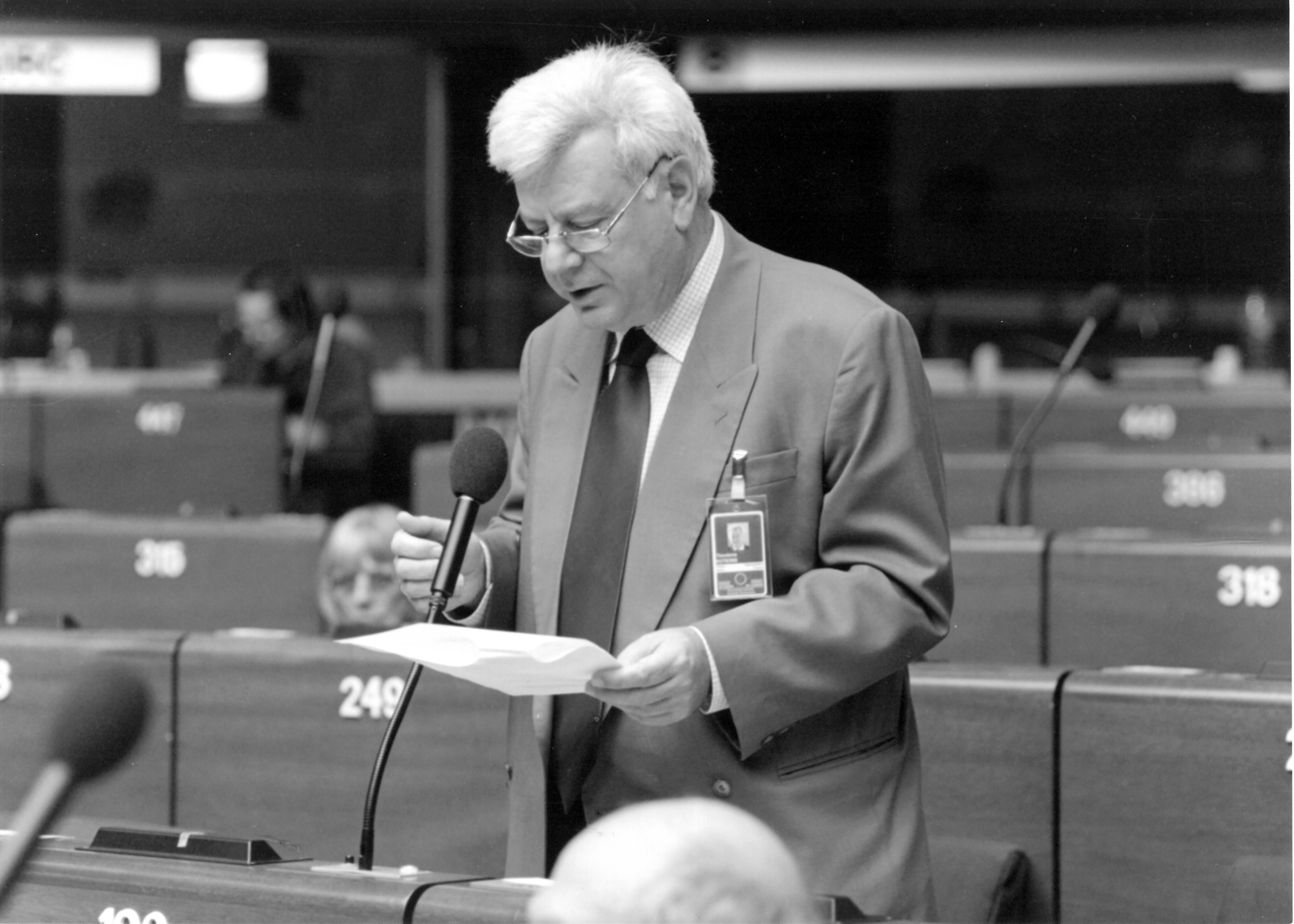

Member of the Hellenic Parliament
- In office 5 November 1989 – 11 February 2004
- Constituency: Corinth

Personal details
- Born: 11 March 1945 Corinth, Greece
- Died: 5 November 2023 (aged 78)
- Party: PASOK
- Education: National and Kapodistrian University of Athens
- Occupation: Physician

Theodoros Kotsonis (Greek: Θεόδωρος Κοτσώνης; 11 March 1945 – 5 November 2023) was a Greek physician and politician. A member of PASOK, he served in the Hellenic Parliament from 1989 to 2004.

Kotsonis died on 5 November 2023, at the age of 78.
