= William Neill (priest) =

Irish Anglican priest (1930–2023)

William Barnett Neill (1930 – 14 November 2023) was an Irish Anglican priest who was Archdeacon of Dromore from 1985 to 1997.

== Biography ==
William Barnett Neill was born in Drumbeg and educated at Trinity College, Dublin. He was ordained in 1964 and his first post was a curacy at Dundonald. He was the incumbent of Drumgath from 1972 to 1980; Drumgooland from 1976 to 1980; Mount Merrion from 1980 to 1983; and of Dromore Cathedral from 1983 until his retirement in 1997. Neill died on 14 November 2023, at the age of 93.
