= John A. Talbott =

American psychiatrist (1935–2023)

John Andrew Talbott (November 8, 1935 – November 29, 2023) was an American psychiatrist. He was President of the American Psychiatric Association from 1984 to 1985. Talbott was an early proponent of deinstitutionalization. He died on November 29, 2023, at the age of 88. He graduated from Harvard College and Columbia University College of Physicians and Surgeons. He taught at University of Maryland School of Medicine.
