= Francette Lazard =

French teacher and politician (1937–2023)

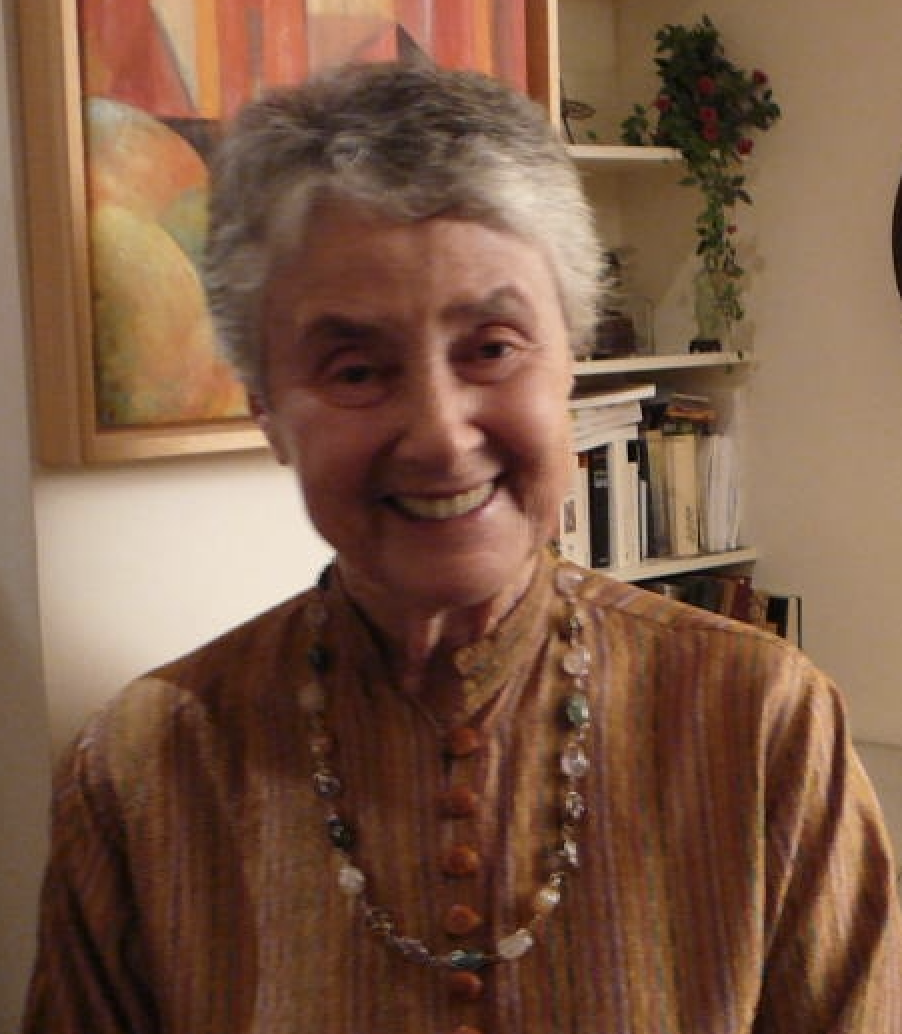
- Lazard in 2022

Director of the Institut de recherches marxistes

Personal details
- Born: Francette Alice Lazard; 7 January 1937 Neuilly-sur-Seine, France
- Died: 3 November 2023 (aged 86)
- Party: PCF
- Education: University of Paris
- Occupation: Teacher

Francette Alice Lazard (7 January 1937 – 3 November 2023) was a French teacher and politician of the French Communist Party (PCF).

== Biography ==
Born in Neuilly-sur-Seine on 7 January 1937, Lazard was the granddaughter of economist and sociologist Max Lazard. Her father, Francis, was a surgeon and her mother, Françoise Levaillant, was a doctor. After the German occupation of the Zone libre, her father joined the Free French Forces in North Africa. Lazard hid in Le Chambon-sur-Lignon with her older sister. After Liberation, her parents both joined the PCF, while she joined the Federation of Communist Youth of France and later the PCF herself in 1952.

In July 1956 she married François Widemann, a physicist. The couple had two children, Benoît (b. 1957) and Thomas (b. 1961), and divorced in 1965. After graduating from the University of Paris, Lazard became an associate teacher of history and geography in 1960 in Orléans and later the Lycée Fénelon, Paris. At the same time, she was heavily involved in the economic sector of the PCF and was elected to the party's central committee in 1969. She contributed to the magazine Économie & Politique, of which she became deputy editor-in-chief in 1966.

Lazard participated in the management of the weekly magazine France nouvelle from 1970 to 1976 before her appointment as deputy editor-in-chief of L'Humanité, serving from 1976 to 1979. She was a member of the politburo from 1979 to 1996 and participated in the foundation of the Institut de recherches marxistes, of which she became the first director. She then took over leadership of Espaces Marx in 1995. She took part in Left Front meetings in 2012.

Francette Lazard died on 3 November 2023, at the age of 86, with homage given by PCF national secretary Fabien Roussel.

== Publications ==
- L'intéressement des ouvriers et les mythes sur la solidarité entre le capital et le travail (1968)
- Propriété, pouvoir et participation, mythes et réalités (1969)
- La révolution inattendue (1991)
- Les vérités du matin : regards croisés sur un engagement (2011)
- L'engagement dans le passé, aujourd'hui et demain (2011)
