= Mike Craig (field hockey) =

Australian field hockey player (1931–2023)

Personal information
- Nationality: Australian
- Born: 7 February 1931 Melbourne, Victoria, Australia
- Died: 20 November 2023 (aged 92) Malvern East, Victoria, Australia

Sport
- Sport: Field hockey

Michael Lindsay Craig (7 February 1931 – 20 November 2023) was an Australian field hockey player. He competed in the men's tournament at the 1960 Summer Olympics. Craig died in Malvern East on 20 November 2023, at the age of 92.
