= David Ratnavale =

Sri Lankan psychiatrist

David Nesaraja Ratnavale (1928 – November 29, 2023) was a Sri Lankan-born psychiatrist who specialized in disaster relief on which he advised the Sri Lankan president.

Ratnavale graduated from the University of Ceylon and in 1973 was the first Western-trained psychiatrist invited to China. He was the chairman of Human Disaster Management council of Sri Lanka. Dr Ratnavale had his primary and secondary education in Trinity College, Kandy where he won The Ryde Gold Medal for the best all round boy in 1947.

As of 2015, he was still privately practicing in Bethesda, Maryland. He died on November 29, 2023, at the age of 95.
