= Albert Heinemann =

German jurist and politician (1938–2023)

Member of the Landtag of Lower Saxony
- In office 1990–2003

Personal details
- Born: 15 December 1938 Celle, Germany
- Died: 9 November 2023 (aged 84)
- Party: CDU
- Education: Kiel University; University of Vienna
- Occupation: Jurist

Albert Heinemann (15 December 1938 – 9 November 2023) was a German jurist and politician. A member of the Christian Democratic Union, he served in the Landtag of Lower Saxony from 1990 to 2003.

Heinemann died on 9 November 2023, at the age of 84.
