= Albert Strickler (poet) =

French poet and author (1955–2023)

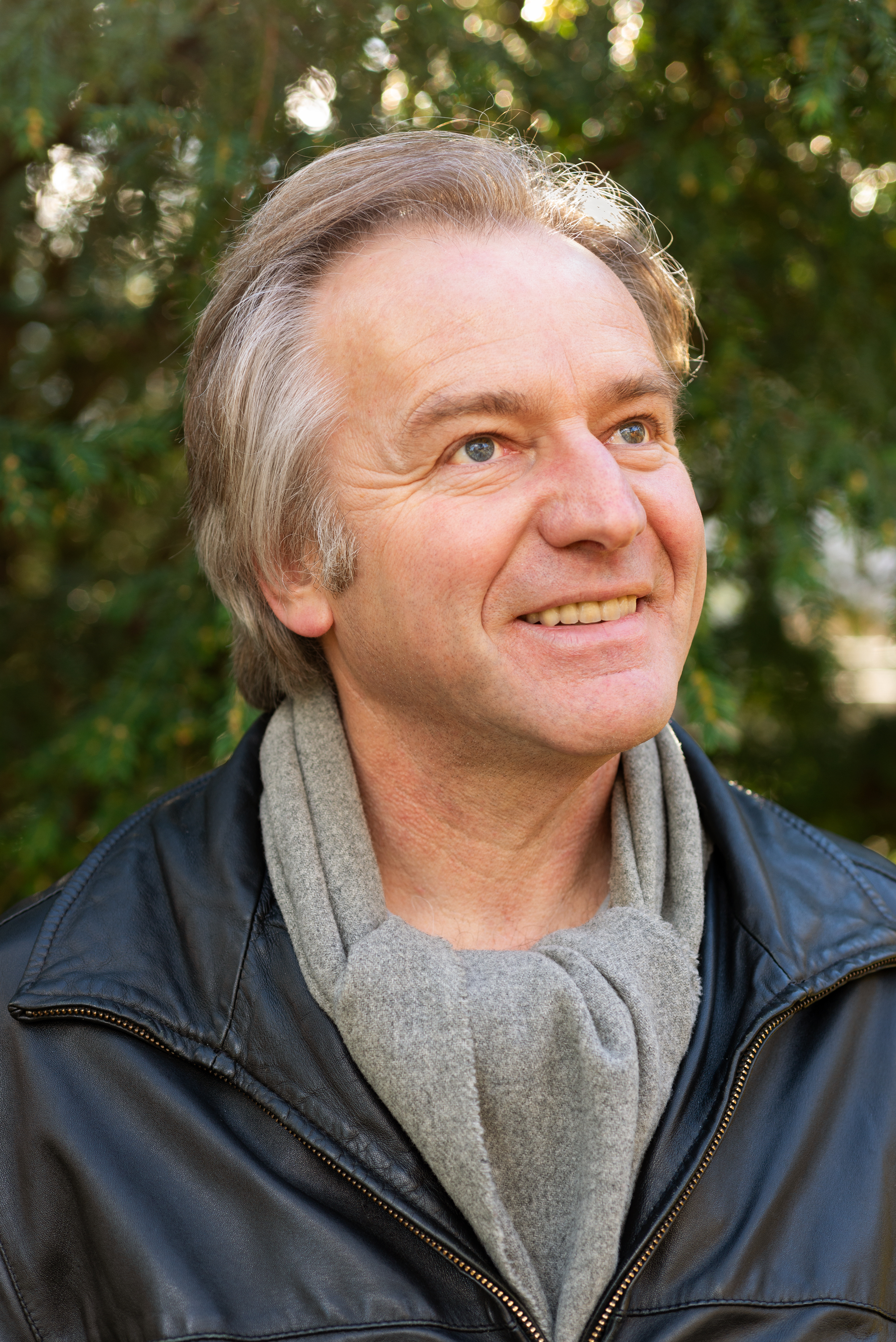
- Born: 22 May 1955; Sessenheim, France
- Died: 7 November 2023 (aged 68)
- Occupations: Poet; Author

Albert Strickler (22 May 1955 – 7 November 2023) was a French poet and author.

A public figure, Strickler directed cultural affairs for Sélestat from 1999 to 2002.

== Publications ==
=== Poems ===
- Graphologie des Horloges (1983)
- L’Établi musical (1984)
- La Voix Lactée (1988)
- Vigilance Éblouie (1990)
- Effleurante fertilité (1993)
- Dans l'ogive d'une larme (1995)
- Éloge des semaines (1998)
- Le brûlis du cœur (1988)
- À celle qui est venue (2003)
- Lettre à Jean-Paul de Dadelsen (2007)

=== Books ===
- Comme un roseau de lumière (1994)
- De feuilles mortes et d'étourneaux (1995)
- Des sillons dans la neige (1995)
- Il a plu sur les cerises (1995)
- Le cœur saxifrage (1999)
- Au-dessus du brouillard (2008)
- Le Bréviaire de l'écureuil (2009)

=== With Gilbert Moser ===
- Mon cœur est une étoile (1991)

=== With Rolf Ball ===
- Peins-moi un poème (1996)

=== With Patrice Thébault ===
- Passions (1998)

=== With Colette Ottmann ===
- Le Tourneciel (2005)
- L’Homme qui marche (2008)

=== With Sylvie Lander ===
- Au souffle de l'ange (2006)

=== With Benjamin Strickler ===
- Le Voyage de l'arbre (2007)

=== With Gérard Brand ===
- Gérard Brand une vie en mosaïque (2011)
