= Fikret Güler =

Turkish taekwondo practitioner (1953–2023)

Fikret Güler (6 May 1953 – 17 November 2023) was a Turkish Taekwondo Grand Master and 9th-degree black belt. He was a key figure in the development of martial arts in Scandinavia, particularly in Finland. Throughout his Taekwondo career, he remained affiliated with the International Taekwon-Do Federation. For many years, he served as the coach of the Finnish national taekwondo team, leading it to significant international success in competitions. Güler was also influential at both national and international organizational levels and served as the President of the Turkish National Governing Body of the International Taekwon-Do Federation. He died on 17 November 2023, at the age of 70.
