= Jacques Bérès =

French orthopedic surgeon (1941–2023)

- Born: 20 June 1941; Aurillac, France
- Died: 12 November 2023 (aged 82)
- Occupation: Orthopedic surgeon

Jacques Bérès (20 June 1941 – 12 November 2023) was a French orthopedic surgeon. He was a co-founder of Médecins Sans Frontières and Médecins du Monde.

Bérès died on 12 November 2023, at the age of 82.
