= Alcides Franciscato =

Brazilian politician (1929–2023)

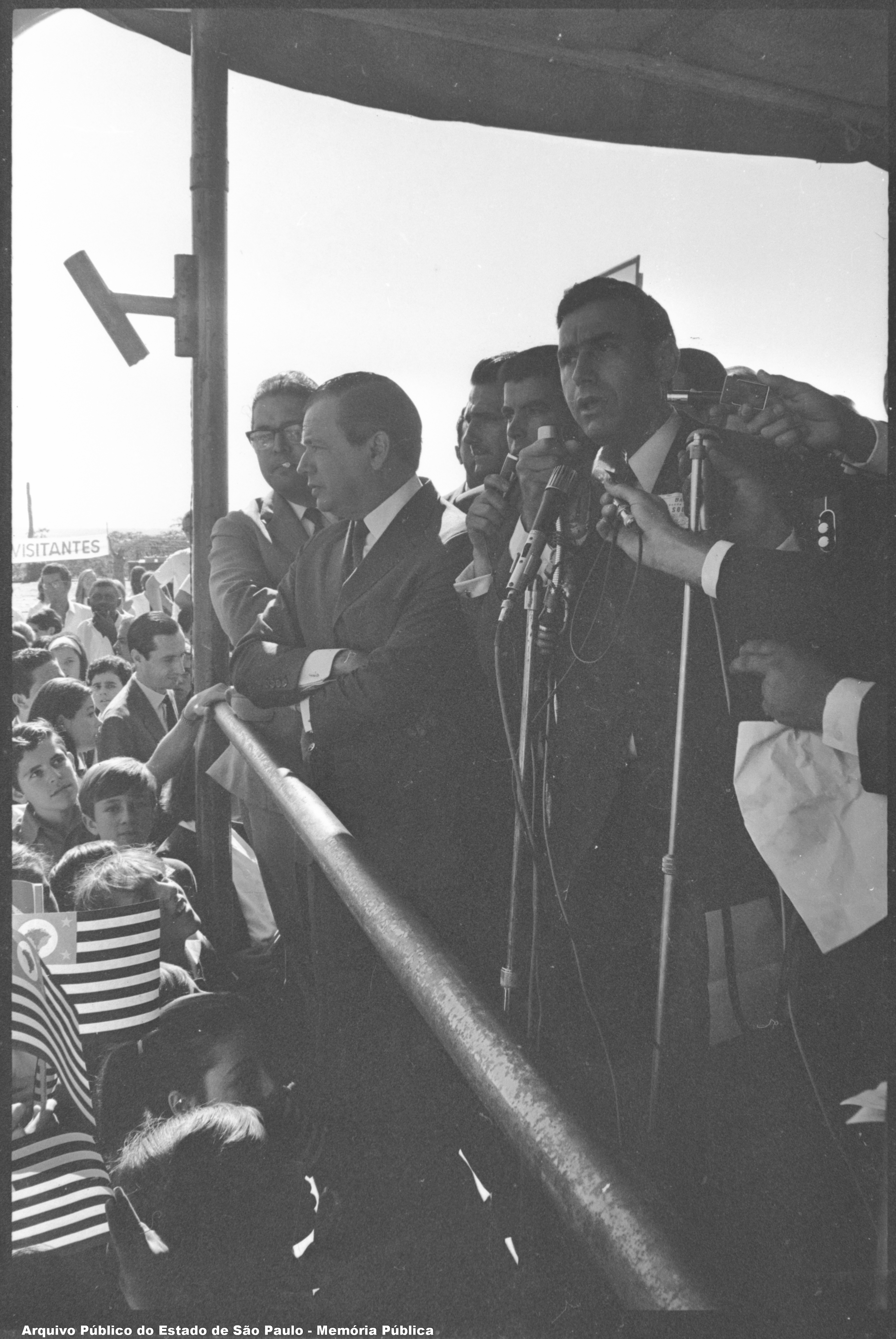
- Franciscato in 1970

Member of the Chamber of Deputies of Brazil for São Paulo
- In office 12 March 1983 – 11 March 1987
- In office 12 March 1979 – 11 March 1983
- In office 12 March 1975 – 11 March 1979

Mayor of Bauru
- In office 1 January 1969 – 10 March 1973
- Preceded by: Nuno de Assis
- Succeeded by: Luís Edmundo Coube

Personal details
- Born: 3 June 1929 Piracicaba, São Paulo, Brazil
- Died: 8 November 2023 (aged 94) São Paulo, Brazil
- Party: ARENA; PDS; PP
- Education: University of São Paulo
- Occupation: Engineer

Alcides Franciscato (3 June 1929 – 8 November 2023) was a Brazilian engineer and politician. A member of the National Renewal Alliance, the Democratic Social Party, and the Progressive Party, he was a three-time deputy and was mayor of Bauru from 1969 to 1973.

Franciscato died in São Paulo on 8 November 2023, at the age of 94.
