= H. Roger Grant =

American railroad historian and author (1943/1944–2023)

H. Roger Grant (1943/1944 – November 17, 2023) was an American railroad historian and author. He died on November 17, 2023, at the age of 79.

== Education ==
In 1970, Grant received a PhD from the University of Missouri.

== Career ==
In 1970, Grant started teaching at The University of Akron. In 1996, he began teaching at Clemson University.

== Books ==
- Sunset Cluster: A Shortline Railroad Saga (Indiana University Press, 2023)
- The Station Agent and the American Railroad Experience (Indiana University Press, 2022).
- A Mighty Fine Road: A History of the Chicago, Rock Island & Pacific Railroad Company (Indiana University Press, 2020)
- Transportation and the American People (Indiana University Press, 2019)
- John W. Barringer III: Railroad Legend (Indiana University Press, 2018)
- Rails to the Front: The Role of Railroads in Wartime (with A. J. Veenendaal Jr.), (Karwansaray Publishers, 2017)
- Electric Interurbans and the American People (Indiana University Press (2016)
- Railroaders without Borders: A History of the Railroad Development Corporation (Indiana University Press, 2015)
- The Louisville, Cincinnati, & Charleston Railroad: Dreams of Linking North and South (Indiana University Press, 2014)
- Railroads and the American People (Indiana University Press (2012)
- Twilight Rails: The Final Era of Railroad Building in the Midwest (University of Minnesota Press, 2010).
- Visionary Railroader: Jervis Langdon Jr. and the Transportation Revolution (Indiana University Press, 2008).
- Rails Through the Wiregrass: A History of the Georgia and Florida Railroad (Northern Illinois University Press, 2006)
- The Railroad: The Life Story of a Technology (Greenwood Publishing, 2005)
- Follow the Flag: A History of the Wabash Railroad Company (Northern Illinois University Press, 2004).
- Getting Around: Exploring Transportation History (Krieger Publishing, 2003).
- Iowa Railroads: The Essays of Frank P. Donovan, Jr (University of Iowa Press, 2000)
- Ohio on the Move: Transportation in the Buckeye State (Ohio University Press, 2000)
- The North Western: A History of the Chicago & North Western Railway (Northern Illinois University Press, 1996)
- Erie Lackawanna: Death of An American Railroad (Stanford University Press, 1994)
- Living in the Depot: The Two-Story Railroad Station (University of Iowa Press, 1993)
- Brownie the Boomer: The Life of Charles P. Brown, An American Railroader (Northern Illinois University Press, 1991)
- Spirit Fruit: A Gentle Utopia Northern Illinois University Press, 1988)
- The Corn Belt Route: A History of the Chicago Great Western Railroad Company (Northern Illinois University Press, 1984)
- Self-Help in the 1890s Depression (Iowa State University Press, 1983)
- Insurance Reform: Consumer Action in the Progressive Era (Iowa State University Press, 1979)
