= Keel Watson =

British opera singer

Keel Harvey Watson (9 August 1964 – 8 November 2023) was a British opera singer.

== Biography ==
=== Early life and education ===
Born in Greenford, West London, he was the son of Frank, a specialist in paint mixing, and Calda, an employee at Beechams Pharmaceuticals Initially aspiring to a career in brass music, Watson studied trombone at Trinity College of Music under Roger Brenner and vocal performance with Elizabeth Hawes. A turning point in his career came with a vocal role in an opera, which shifted his focus from brass instruments to opera singing.

=== Career ===
During his career, Watson appeared as the Second Armed Man in Kenneth Branagh's "The Magic Flute" (2006) and provided vocals for Harasta in the BBC's animated broadcast of The Cunning Little Vixen (2003).

In the latter part of his career, despite health challenges, Watson remained active on stage. He performed as Wotan for Regents Opera and various roles at various opera houses, including his debut at the Royal Opera House in 2000.

=== Personal life ===
Keel Watson has two children from his previous marriage. Watson's later partner, Ingeborg Børch, is a Danish mezzo-soprano who often performed alongside him.
