= Louis Oster =

French lawyer (1928–2023)

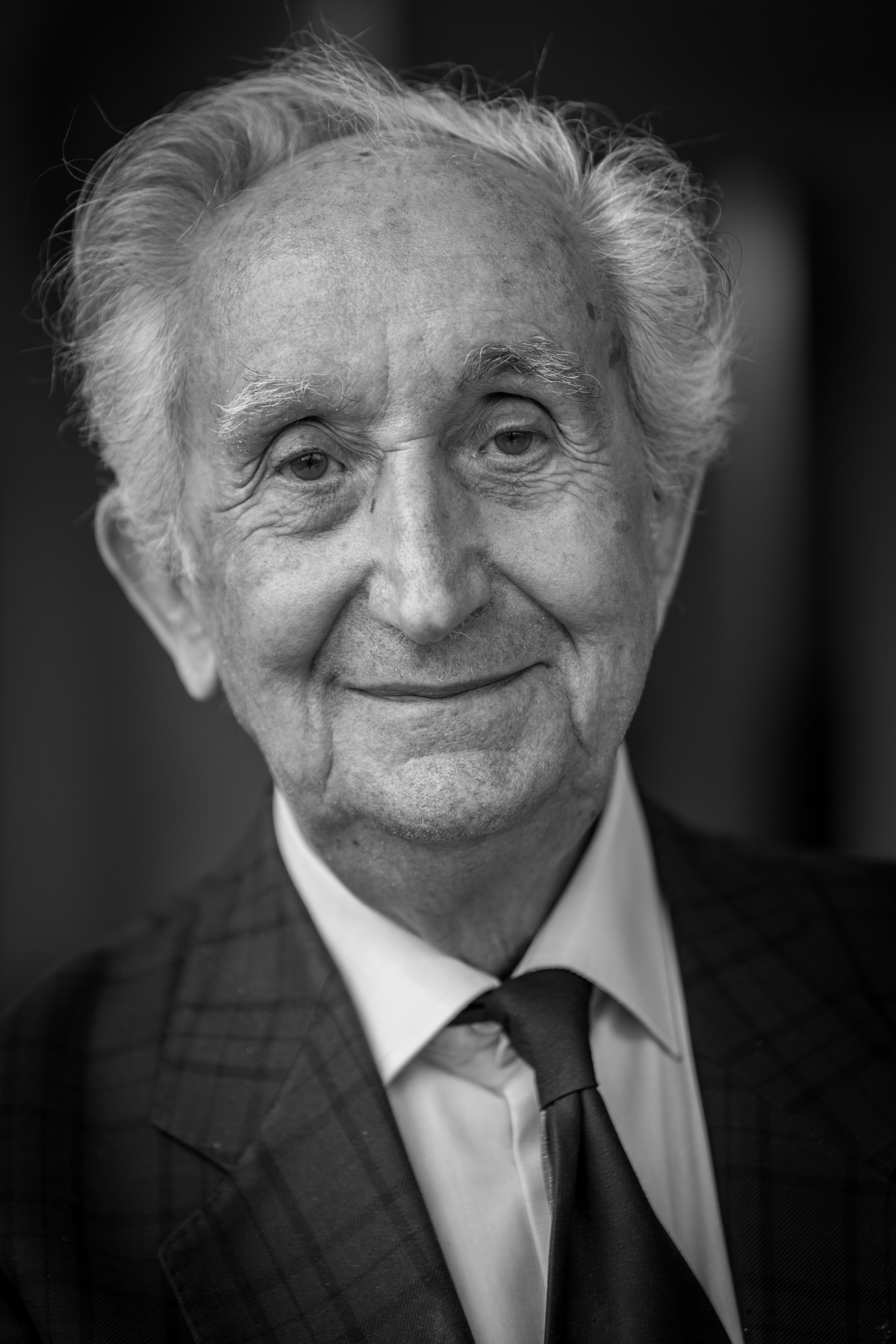
- Oster in 2014
- Born: 13 September 1928; Strasbourg, France
- Died: 8 November 2023 (aged 95)
- Education: University of Strasbourg
- Occupation: Lawyer

Louis Oster (French: [lwi ɔstɛʁ]; 13 September 1928 – 8 November 2023) was a French lawyer. He was the president of the Strasbourg Bar Association and also did work as a musicologist, the author of lyrical works.

== Biography ==
Born in Strasbourg on 13 September 1928, Oster spent the entirety of his studies in his hometown, with the exception of a few years during World War II, when he studied in Fribourg, Switzerland. He earned his law degree from the University of Strasbourg and joined the office of Strasbourg Bar president Pierre Schreckenberg. He was first tasked with preparing the defence for the youth involved in the Oradour-sur-Glane massacre. He spent ten years in public law before opening his own practice.

In 1978, Oster became president of the Strasbourg Bar and counsel for the Conseil national de l'Ordre des médecins. In 1981, he created the École des avocats de Strasbourg, of which he was founding president. In 1982, he became president of the Alsace section of the Union nationale des associations de professions libérales (UNAPL). In 1984, he joined the Conseil économique et social d’Alsace (CESA), of which he was elected president of the organization's culture and sports commission. He also helped to drive the renewal of the Office des langues et des cultures régionales, of which he served as longtime vice-president. He served as treasurer of the Agence culturelle d’Alsace in Sélestat and a member of the board of directors of the Comédie de Colmar.

Marcel Rudloff, at the time President of the Regional Council of Alsace, tasked Oster with harmonization of local law in Alsace-Moselle. In 1983, he was elected president of Groupe Banque Populaire's Alsace branch. That same year, he founded the Cercle Richard Wagner, an association of more than 1000 members.

Louis Oster died on 8 November 2023, at the age of 95.

== Distinctions ==
- Knight of the Legion of Honour
- Officer of the Ordre national du Mérite
- Officer of the Ordre des Palmes académiques
- Officer of the Ordre des Arts et des Lettres (2022), Knight in 2007

== Publications ==
- Le charme opéra : Guide de nos opéras favoris (2005)
- Guide raisonné et déraisonnable de l’opérette et de la comédie musicale (2008)
