= Magda Hollander-Lafon =

Hungarian-born French writer and psychologist (1927–2023)

- Born: Magdolna Hollander; 15 June 1928; Záhony, Hungary
- Died: 26 November 2023 (aged 95); Rennes, France
- Occupations: Writer; Psychologist

Madga Hollander-Lafon (15 June 1928 – 26 November 2023) was a Hungarian-born French writer, psychologist, and educator.

Of Jewish origin, Hollander-Lafon was deported to Auschwitz but survived the Holocaust. She moved to France in 1954 and wrote the books Quatre petits bouts de pain and Demain au creux de nos mains.

== Biography ==
Born in Záhony on 15 June 1928, Hollander-Lafon's mother, Esther, and her younger sister, Irène, were killed during the Holocaust. However, Hollander-Lafon lied about her age, claiming to be eighteen, so that she could work in forced labor and survive. During a transfer in April 1945, she escaped alongside four other deportees, who were found by American soldiers. She attributed her survival to a dying woman who shared bread with her and a guard who gave her shoes to help with her work.

After her freedom, Hollander-Lafon became an educator and child psychologist, having trained in France and Belgium. She moved to France in 1954, where she remained for the rest of her life. She spent 44 years caring for children in an orphanage, where she converted to Christianity.

Madga Hollander-Lafon died in Rennes on 26 November 2023, at the age of 95.

== Works ==
- Quatre petits bouts de pain (2012)
- Demain au creux de nos mains (2021)

== Tributes ==
- The Établissement Régional d’Enseignement Adapté de Rennes was named after her
- A square in Vern-sur-Seiche was named after her on 26 March 2022
