= Danutė Kvietkevičiūtė =

Lithuanian textile designer (1939–2023)

Danutė Kvietkevičiūtė (5 June 1939 – 21 November 2023) was a Lithuanian textile designer.

After graduating from the Lithuanian Institute of Fine Arts, from 1967 she participated in exhibitions in Lithuania and abroad. Her works are on display at the Lithuanian National Museum and Čiurlionis National Museum of Fine Arts. Kvietkevičiūtė died on 21 November 2023, at the age of 84.
