= Ivan Korshynskyi =

Ukrainian doctor and politician (1928–2023)

- Іван Коршинський
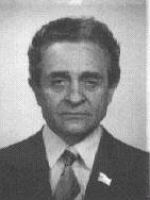
- Korshynskyi in 1994

People's Deputy of Ukraine
- In office 11 May 1994 – 12 May 1998

Personal details
- Born: Ivan Yuriyovich Korshynskyi; 5 June 1928 Bushtyna, Carpathian Ruthenia, Czechoslovakia
- Died: 16 November 2023 (aged 95) Uzhhorod, Ukraine
- Party: Independent
- Education: Uzhhorod National University
- Occupation: Doctor

Ivan Yuriyovich Korshynskyi (Ukrainian: Іван Юрійович Коршинський; 5 June 1928 – 16 November 2023) was a Ukrainian doctor and politician. An independent, he served in the Verkhovna Rada from 1994 to 1998.

Korshynskyi was born in Bushtyna, Czechoslovakia on 5 June 1928.

Korshynskyi died in Uzhhorod, Ukraine, on 16 November 2023, at the age of 95.
