= Antoni Marí Calbet =

Spanish doctor and politician (1932–2023)

Member of the Parliament of the Balearic Islands
- In office 31 May 1983 – 31 March 2003

Personal details
- Born: 26 January 1932 Ibiza, Spain
- Died: 23 November 2023 (aged 91) Ibiza, Spain
- Party: PP
- Education: University of Valencia; Institute of Tropical Medicine Antwerp
- Occupation: Doctor

Antoni Marí Calbet (26 January 1932 – 23 November 2023) was a Spanish doctor and politician. A member of the People's Party, he served in the Parliament of the Balearic Islands from 1983 to 2003.

Calbet was born in Ibiza on 26 January 1932, and died there on 23 November 2023, at the age of 91.
