= Jean Mouton (politician) =

French politician (1929–2023)

President of the General Council of Drôme
- In office 18 September 2002 – 1 April 2004
- Preceded by: Charles Monge
- Succeeded by: Didier Guillaume
- In office 1992 – 23 March 2001
- Preceded by: Rodolphe Pesce
- Succeeded by: Charles Monge

Deputy of the French National Assembly for Drôme
- In office 2 April 1986 – 14 May 1988

General Councillor of the Canton of Pierrelatte
- In office 1973–2004
- Preceded by: Gustave Jaume
- Succeeded by: Marie-Pierre Mouton

Mayor of Pierrelatte
- In office 27 March 1971 – September 2002
- Succeeded by: Yves Le Bellec

Personal details
- Born: 15 February 1929 Montfrin, France
- Died: 4 November 2023 (aged 94)
- Party: UDF; UMP
- Occupation: Veterinarian

Jean Mouton (15 February 1929 – 4 November 2023) was a French veterinarian and politician of the Union for French Democracy (UDF) and the Union for a Popular Movement (UMP).

== Biography ==
Born in Montfrin on 15 February 1929, Mouton was the son of Alexandre Mouton and Jacqueline Dijol. He was the father of Marie-Pierre Mouton, who would succeed him as General Councillor of the Canton of Pierrelatte and as mayor of Pierrelatte.

Mouton was elected to the National Assembly in 1986. He then served as President of the General Council of Drôme from 1992 to 2004, with a brief interruption from 2001 to 2002 for health reasons. He was then succeeded by Yves Le Bellec as mayor of Pierrelatte.

In 1991, Mouton founded Drôme provençale alongside Senator Jean Besson.

Jean Mouton died on 4 November 2023, at the age of 94.
