= Mario Castaño =

Colombian accountant and politician (1971–2023)

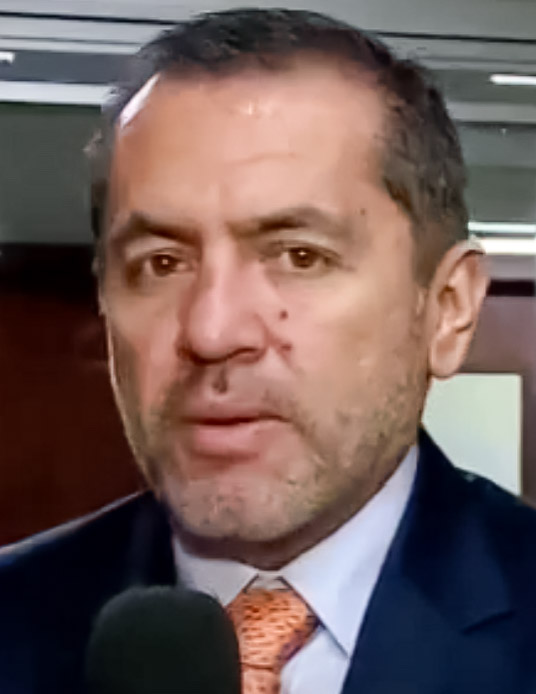

Member of the Senate of Colombia
- In office 20 July 2018 – 7 June 2022

Member of the Chamber of Representatives of Colombia for Caldas
- In office 20 July 2014 – 20 July 2018

Personal details
- Born: Mario Alberto Castaño; 8 December 1971 Pácora, Colombia
- Died: 18 November 2023 (aged 51) Bogotá, Colombia
- Party: PLC
- Education: Autonomous University of Manizales
- Occupation: Accountant

Mario Alberto Castaño (8 December 1971 – 18 November 2023) was a Colombian accountant and politician. A member of the Colombian Liberal Party, he served in the Chamber of Representatives from 2014 to 2018 and in the Senate from 2018 to 2022.

Castaño died of a heart attack in Bogotá on 18 November 2023, at the age of 51.
