= Linda Parry =

Linda Lou Alberta Parry (18 October 1945 - 21 November 2023) was a British textiles historian and museum curator. She was an expert on the textiles of the Arts and Crafts movement with a particular focus on William Morris.

== Books ==
- Parry, Linda (1983). William Morris Textiles. Viking Press. ISBN 978-0-670-77075-5.
- Parry, Linda (2013). William Morris Textiles. Harry N. Abrams. ISBN 978-1-85177-732-7.
- Parry, Linda (1996). William Morris. Harry N. Abrams. ISBN 978-0-8109-4282-0.
- Parry, Linda (2005). Textiles of the Arts and Crafts Movement. Thames & Hudson. ISBN 978-0-500-28536-7.
