= Alessandra Bianchi =

Italian sports journalist (1964–2023)

- Born: 27 September 1964; Rome, Italy
- Died: 14 November 2023 (aged 59); Rome, Italy
- Occupation: Sports journalist

Alessandra Bianchi (27 September 1964 – 14 November 2023) was an Italian sports journalist. She specialized in her coverage of football.

== Biography ==
Born in Rome in 1964, Bianchi started her career with the daily newspaper Corriere dello Sport and was the Italy correspondent for L'Équipe and Le Parisien. In September 2005, she appeared on L'Équipe du dimanche, aired on Canal+ as a correspondent for Italian football. In 2006, she joined the DKP (radio) team on RMC alongside Guy Kédia and Alexandre Delpérier. She left the following year to pursue other endeavors. In March 2008, she published the novel Calcio, Mon Amour with Florent Massot. In September 2013, she joined DieseFoot and worked for L'Équipe du soir and the TV channel L'Équipe. In her private life, she was an ardent supporter of AS Roma and Francesco Totti.

Alessandra Bianchi died in Rome on 14 November 2023, at the age of 59.

== Books ==
- Sabbia tra le dita (2005)
- Calcio mon amour (2008)
