= Guy Vattier =

French politician (1939–2023)

Deputy of the French National Assembly for Meurthe-et-Moselle
- In office 8 May 1988 – 14 May 1988
- Preceded by: René Haby

Personal details
- Born: 8 March 1939 Constantine, French Algeria
- Died: 19 November 2023 (aged 84)
- Party: UDF

Guy Vattier (French: [gi vatje]; 8 March 1939 – 19 November 2023) was a French politician of the Union for French Democracy (UDF).

== Biography ==
Born in Constantine, French Algeria on 8 March 1939, Vattier served in the National Assembly for six days, from 8 to 14 May 1988, following the resignation of René Haby.

Vattier had more success in politics at the communal level, becoming the mayor of Briey (Meurthe-et-Moselle) in 1984, and remaining in that office until 2016. In July 2021, however, Vattier was sentenced to a one-year suspended prison sentence for sexual harassment. On 10 October 2023, he was excluded from the Legion of Honour and the Ordre national du Mérite.

Guy Vattier died on 19 November 2023, at the age of 84.
