= Jean-Philippe Thierry =

French businessman (1948–2023)

- Born: 16 October 1948; Paris, France
- Died: 10 November 2023 (aged 75)
- Education: Sciences Po
- Occupation: Businessman
- Known for: Former CEO of insurance company AGF

Jean-Philippe Thierry (16 October 1948 – 10 November 2023) was a French businessman in the insurance industry who served as CEO of AGF.

== Early life ==
Born in Paris on 16 October 1948, Thierry graduated from the Sciences Po.

== Career ==
He joined GPA Assurances in 1978, where he served as president from 1989 to 2000. In 1992, he was also president of Worms & Cie and became president of Generali France in 1999. On 6 June 2001, he was named CEO of AGF.

In 1996, Thierry became president of the Fédération française des sociétés anonymes d'assurance. During his time as CEO of AGF, he was the highest-paid CEO in France, pocketing a salary of 23.2 million euros. In February 2009, he was appointed to the board of directors of Atos. In 2010, he became vice-president of the French Prudential Supervision and Resolution Authority.

== Death ==
Jean-Philippe Thierry died on 10 November 2023, at the age of 75.

== Recognition ==
- Knight of the Legion of Honour (1997)
- Commander of the Order of Saint-Charles (2011)
