= Michio Fukuoka =

Japanese sculptor (1936–2023)

- Born: 1936; Sakai, Japan
- Died: 15 November 2023 (aged 87)
- Occupation: Sculptor

Michio Fukuoka (Japanese: 福岡道雄 Fukuoka Michio; 1936 – 15 November 2023) was a Japanese sculptor.

== Biography ==
Born in Sakai in 1936, Fukuoka was a professor of fine arts at Kansai University. He began his career in the 1950s by making plaster casts of holes he had dug in sand. In the 1960s, he created a series of sculptures resembling balloons floating in the air. In the 1970s, Michio Fukuoka produced gigantic sculptures of moths in different positions. In the 1980s, he became more focused on self-portraits in landscapes, in which he was gardening or fishing. He also created a series of wooden boxes his size, which represented coffins. In the 1990s, he created black plastic panels on which he engraved the same sentence hundreds of times in white. In the 2000s, he sculpted the "Rotten Balls", which vaguely represented testicles. In 2005, he retired from sculpting.

Fukuoka died on 15 November 2023, at the age of 87.
