= Keith Beckwith =

Australian rules footballer (1938–2023)

Personal information
- Full name: Keith Beckwith
- Born: 9 December 1938
- Died: 24 November 2023 (aged 84)
- Original team: Preston Wanderers
- Height: 163 cm (5 ft 4 in)
- Weight: 71 kg (157 lb)

Playing career^{1}
Years	Club	Games (Goals)
1958	Collingwood	1 (1)
- ^{1} Playing statistics correct to the end of 1958.

Keith Beckwith (9 December 1938 – 24 November 2023) was an Australian rules footballer who played with Collingwood in the Victorian Football League (VFL). He died on 24 November 2023, at the age of 84.
