= Colombo Machado Salles =

Brazilian politician (1926–2023)

- Salles in 1973

Governor of Santa Catarina
- In office 15 March 1971 – 15 March 1975
- Preceded by: Ivo Silveira
- Succeeded by: Antônio Carlos Konder Reis

Personal details
- Born: 20 May 1926 Laguna, Santa Catarina, Brazil
- Died: 14 November 2023 (aged 97) Florianópolis, Santa Catarina, Brazil
- Party: ARENA
- Education: Federal University of Paraná
- Occupation: Engineer

Colombo Machado Salles (20 May 1926 – 14 November 2023) was a Brazilian engineer and politician of the National Renewal Alliance (ARENA).

Salles was Governor of Santa Catarina from 1971 to 1975. His administration's main project was the revitalization of urban areas to stimulate economic growth, including the installation of 85,000 telephone lines. He also led the construction of a bridge, which today bears his name as the Colombo Salles Bridge.

Colombo Machado Salles died in Florianópolis on 14 November 2023, at the age of 97.
