= Laurent Greilsamer =

French journalist and essayist (1953–2023)

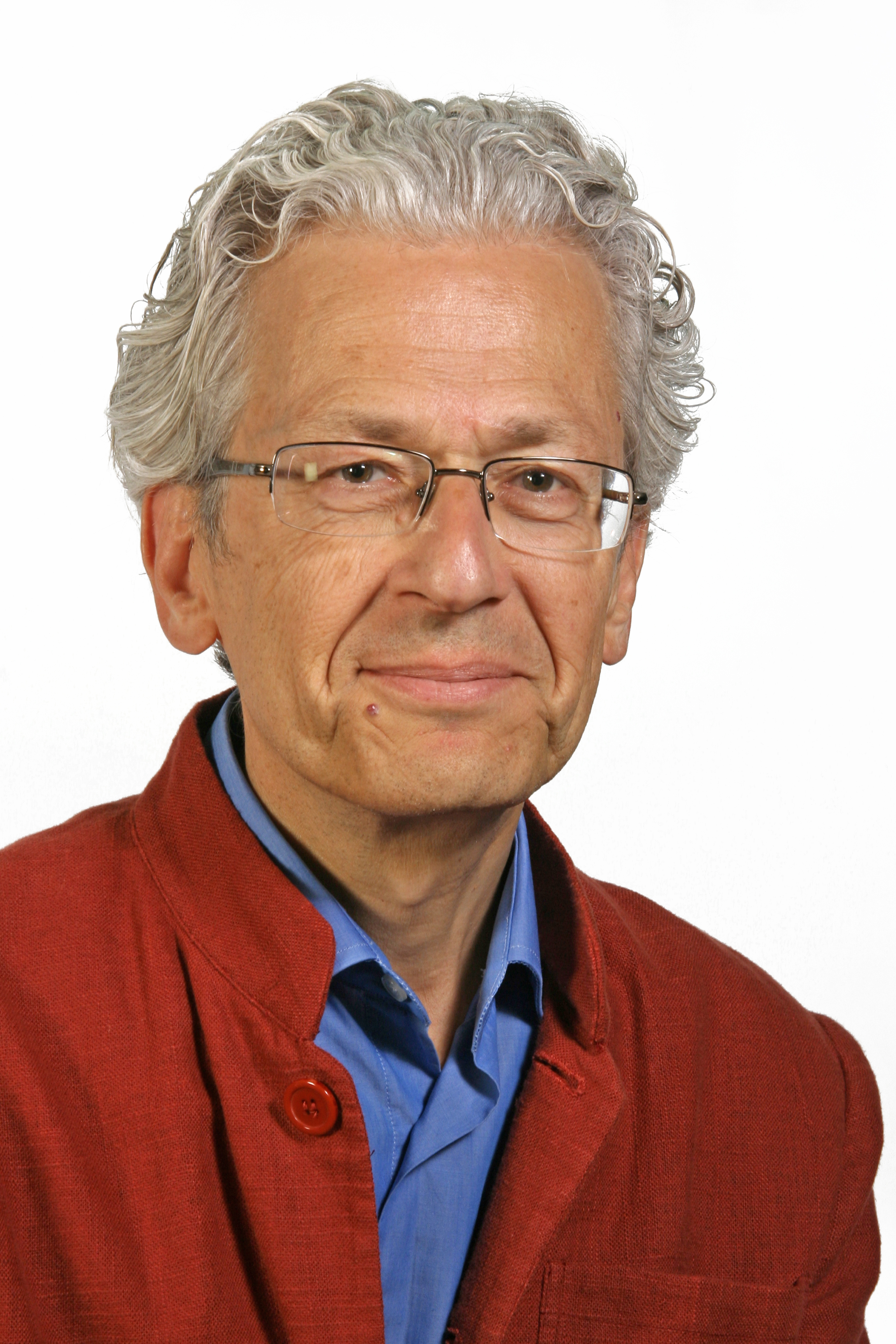
- Greilsamer in 2012
- Born: 2 February 1953; Neuilly-sur-Seine, France
- Died: 8 November 2023 (aged 70)
- Education: École supérieure de journalisme de Lille
- Occupations: Journalist; Essayist

Laurent Greilsamer (2 February 1953 – 8 November 2023) was a French journalist and essayist. He served as deputy director of Le Monde and co-founded the weekly newspaper Le 1 in 2014.

== Biography ==
Born in a Jewish family in Neuilly-sur-Seine on 2 February 1953, Greilsamer graduated from the École supérieure de journalisme de Lille and was a journalist for Le Figaro from 1974 to 1976 and for Le Quotidien de Paris in 1977. He joined Le Monde in 1977 and served in the positions of editor, reporter, senior editor, editor-in-chief, deputy editorial director, and deputy director, where he served from 2007 to 2011.

On television, Greilsamer presented the program Le Monde des idées from 2005 to 2006. He was the author of numerous documentaries, including Le Monde contre le président : Beuve-Méry vs de Gaulle, broadcast on France 5 in April 2014. He also wrote La parole est au garde des Sceaux, broadcast on France 5 in 2016. Additionally, he authored four biographies: Le Prince foudroyé : la vie de Nicolas de Staël, L'Éclair au front : la vie de René Char, L'Homme du Monde : la vie d'Hubert Beuve-Méry, and La Vraie Vie du capitaine Dreyfus. In 2014, alongside Éric Fottorino, he founded the weekly Le 1.

Laurent Greilsamer died on 8 November 2023, at the age of 70.

== Works ==
- Un certain Monsieur Paul (1989)
- Hubert Beuve-Mery (1990)
- Le procès du sang contaminé (1992)
- Les juges parlent (1992)
- Interpol (1997)
- Le prince foudroyé : la vie de Nicolas de Staël (1998)
- Où vont les juges ? (2002)
- René Char, l'éclair au front (2004)
- Le Dico de la présidentielle (2007)
- La Déclaration universelle des droits de l'Homme (2009)
- La Favorite (2012)
- Le Dictionnaire Michelet : un voyage dans l'histoire et la géographie française (2012)
- Jean-Paul Viguier architecture (2013)
- La vraie vie du capitaine Dreyfus (2014)
- Le Dictionnaire George Sand (2014)
- Fromanger, de toutes les couleurs (2018)
