= Leila Mustafa =

Kurdish politician in Syria (1988–2023)

Leyla Mustafa
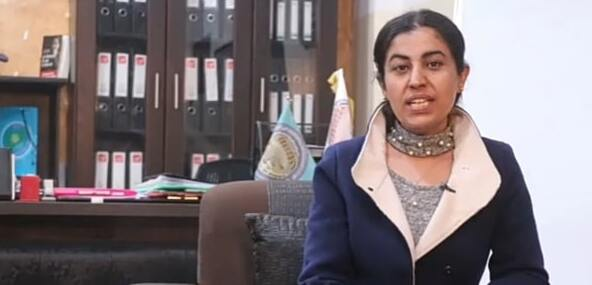
- Born: 12 September 1988; Raqqa, Syria
- Died: 25 November 2023 (aged 35); Damascus, Syria
- Occupations: Civil engineer, Politician
- Years active: 2017–2022
- Organization: Civil Council of Raqqa
- Known for: Co-Chair of the Civil Council of Raqqa, Reconstruction of Raqqa, Women's liberation advocacy
- Notable work: Renaming Al-Naim Square to "Freedom Square", Leading Raqqa's reconstruction after ISIS
- Term: 2017–2022
- Movement: Autonomous Administration of North and East Syria

Leila Mustafa (12 September 1988 – 25 November 2023) was a Syrian civil engineer and politician who was co-chair of the Civil Council of Raqqa, Syria, which has been under joint Arab-Kurdish control since April 2017.

== Early life and education ==
Leila Mustafa was born on 12 September 1988. She studied civil engineering before the Syrian Civil War. In 2013, rebels from the Free Syrian Army and Jabhat Al-Nusra took over Raqqa, before ISIS arrived in 2014, which prompted Mustafa to flee with her family, paying smugglers to take them to al-Hasakah.

== Political career ==
In late 2018, CBS reported that Mustafa was "chosen by a group of community leaders to run the new civilian council and is the closest thing Raqqa has to a mayor."

Before the fall of Raqqa, the Raqqa Civil Council (RCC) was based in Ain Issa, 50 km north of Raqqa. Reuters described the RCC as "a diverse team co-led by Arab tribal leader Sheikh Mahmoud Shawakh al-Bursan, who wears tribal robes, and Kurdish civil engineer Leila Mustafa, dressed in a green shirt and jeans."

The UN estimated that 80% of buildings in Raqqa had been destroyed in the conflict, and the city had been littered with landmines by ISIS. Mustafa aimed to rebuild the city, but said that it would be a difficult task without more international funding. "“We are striving to rehabilitate the city to the best of our ability, but we are facing many challenges restoring basic services due to the massive level of destruction", she told The Intercept. 150,000 people have reportedly returned to Raqqa since the end of ISIS control of the city, but in August 2018, the US announced that it would cut $230 million in stabilisation funding for Northern Syria. Mustafa stated that the RCC has reopened 200 schools and 70 bakeries.

Mustafa was a supporter of jailed Kurdistan Workers' Party (PKK) leader Abdullah Öcalan. The Times reported Mustafa as saying “The thoughts of our leader, Abdullah Ocalan, were the key factor in the liberation of Raqqa”.

== Death ==
Leila Mustafa died from complications during surgery on 25 November 2023, at the age of 35.
