= Ramón Díaz del Río =

Spanish naval engineer and politician (1940–2023)

Ramón Diaz del Río

Member of the European Parliament
- In office 6 July 1987 – 24 July 1989
- Constituency: Spain

Personal details
- Born: Ramón Diaz del Río Jáudenes; 11 December 1940 Vigo, Spain
- Died: 20 November 2023 (aged 82) Vigo, Spain
- Party: AP
- Education: Escuela Técnica Superior de Ingenieros Navales; Naval Military Academy
- Occupation: Naval engineer

Ramón Diaz del Río Jáudenes (11 December 1940 – 20 November 2023) was a Spanish naval engineer and politician. A member of the People's Alliance, he served as a Member of the European Parliament from 1987 to 1989.

Del Río died in Vigo on 20 November 2023, at the age of 82.
