= Henry E. Allee =

American politician (1942–2023)

Member of the Texas House of Representatives from the 98th district
- In office January 11, 1977 – January 11, 1983

Personal details
- Born: January 1, 1942
- Died: November 21, 2023 (aged 81)
- Party: Democratic
- Education: University of Houston

Henry E. Allee (January 1, 1942 – November 21, 2023) was an American politician. He served as a Democratic member for the 98th district of the Texas House of Representatives.

== Life and career ==
Allee attended the University of Houston. He served in the Texas House of Representatives from 1977 to 1983. Allee died on November 21, 2023, at the age of 81.
