= Hanna Gucwińska =

Polish politician (1932–2023)

Hanna Guzwińska
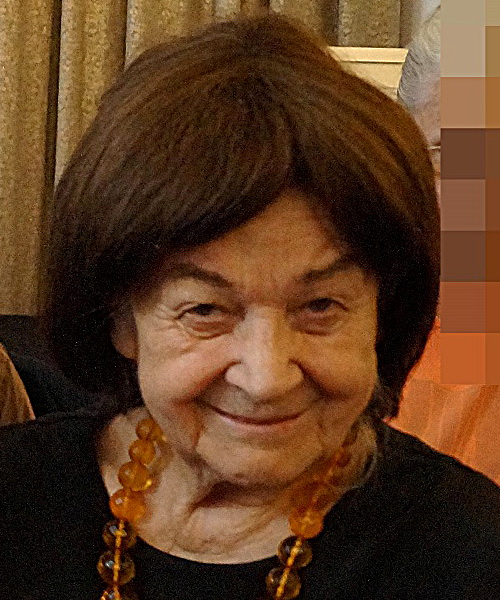
- Gucwińska in 2018

Member of the Sejm
- In office 19 October 2001 – 29 August 2005

Personal details
- Born: Hanna Stefania Gucwińska; 25 May 1932 Warsaw, Poland
- Died: 12 November 2023 (aged 91) Kraków, Poland
- Party: UP
- Education: Wrocław University of Environmental and Life Sciences
- Occupation: Zootechnician

Hanna Stefania Gucwińska (25 May 1932 – 12 November 2023) was a Polish zootechnician and politician. A member of the Labour Union, she served in the Sejm from 2001 to 2005.

Gucwińska died in Kraków on 12 November 2023, at the age of 91.
