= Christiane Rimbaud =

French historian (1944–2023)

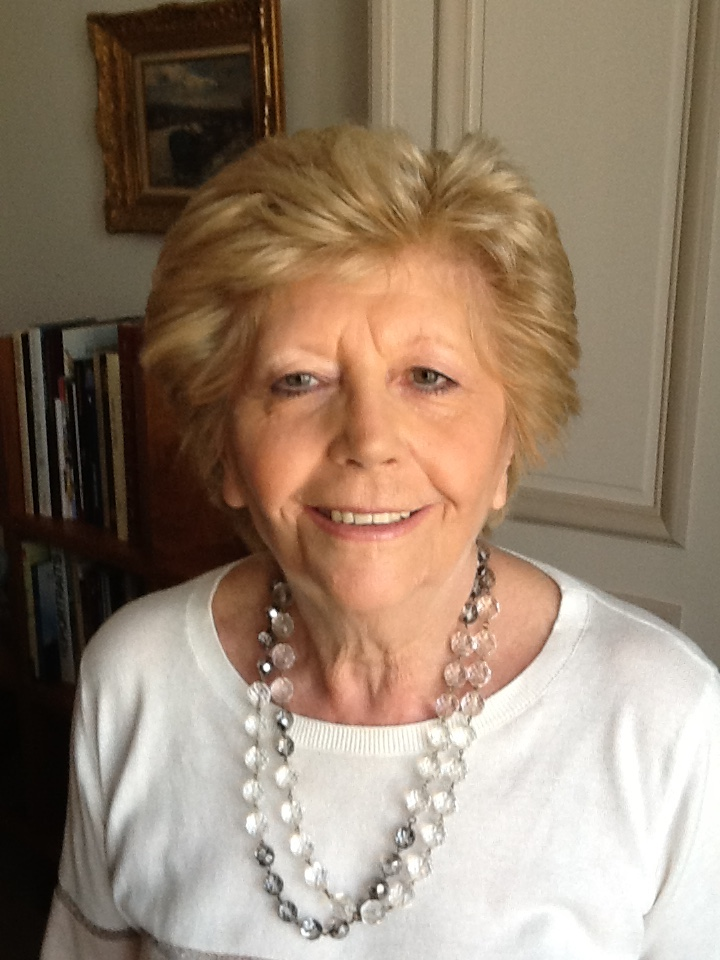
- Born: 22 July 1944; Paris, German-occupied France
- Died: 22 November 2023 (aged 79); Paris, France
- Education: University of Paris; Sciences Po
- Occupation: Historian

Christiane Rimbaud (22 July 1944 – 22 November 2023) was a French historian. After her secondary studies at the Lycée Victor-Duruy and undergraduate studies at the University of Paris, she graduated from the Sciences Po.

Rimbaud co-authored a television program Presse, pouvoir et société alongside Philippe Prince, broadcast on Antenne 2 in 1981.

Christiane Rimbaud died in Paris on 22 November 2023, at the age of 79.

== Publications ==
- Le Procès de Riom (1973)
- Rédactions (1975)
- La Gazette d'un Parisien sous la Révolution (1976)
- 52 millions d'enfants au travail (1980)
- L'Affaire du Massilia (1984)
- Le Procès Mendès France (1986)
- Pinay (1990)
- Le Grand Pari, l'aventure du traité de Rome (1991)
- Bérégovoy (1994)
- Lettres à Béré (1995)
- Traversées du désert, de De Gaulle à nos jours: la disgrâce en politique (1998)
- Maurice Schumann, sa voix, son visage (2000)
- Danielle Hunebelle, grand reporter (2001)
- Pierre Sudreau, un homme libre (2004)
- Femmes d'espoir, leur combat pour les Droits de l'Homme (2008)
- Raymond Barre (2015)
