= Maurizio Creuso =

Italian politician (1943–2023)

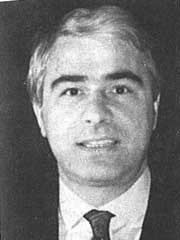
- Creuo in 1992

Member of the Senate of the Republic of Italy
- In office 23 April 1992 – 14 April 1994

Personal details
- Born: 23 May 1943 Boara Pisani, Italy
- Died: 25 November 2023 (aged 80)
- Party: DC
- Education: University of Ferrara

Maurizio Creuso (23 May 1943 – 25 November 2023) was an Italian politician. A member of Christian Democracy, he served in the Senate of the Republic from 1992 to 1994.

Creuso died on 25 November 2023, at the age of 80.
