= Jovan Marić =

Serbian psychiatrist (1941–2023)

Dr. Sci. Med. Jovan Marić
- Born: 11 August 1941; Bijeljina, Independent State of Croatia
- Died: 11 November 2023 (aged 82)
- Citizenship: Serbian, Bosnian
- Education: University of Belgrade Faculty of Medicine
- Occupation: Psychiatrist
- Known for: University professor, Serbian ambassador to Nigeria, Author
- Medical career
- Profession: Medical doctor
- Field: Psychiatry
- Institutions: University of Belgrade Faculty of Medicine, Faculty of Special Education and Rehabilitation, Belgrade Nursing School, University of Belgrade Faculty of Law, Foča Faculty of Medicine; Sveti Vračevi Hospital, Bijeljina
- Sub-specialties: Psychiatry
- Research: Sexology
- Notable works: Klinicka psihijatrija textbook, Ljubav, seks i depresija (Love, Sex and Depression)

Jovan Marić (Serbian Cyrillic: 11 August 1941 – 11 November 2023) was a Serbian psychiatrist, author, Doctor of Medical Sciences and university professor at the Faculty of Medicine in Belgrade.

Marić lectured forensic psychiatry in Faculty of Law in Belgrade, provided psychiatric expertise in court, and served as an ambassador to Nigeria from 2014 until 2016, when he was dismissed following the negative publicity from tabloid media.

Marić died on 11 November 2023, at the age of 82.

== Early life and education ==
Born in Bijeljina, Marić graduated from musical secondary school, his instrument of choice was piano, and he was also the town's chess champion.

Upon graduating from the secondary school, Marić moved to Belgrade and finished the Medical School there, later pursuing his doctoral degree at that university.
