= Alfredo Prieto Valiente =

Spanish politician (1934–2023)

Member of the Congress of Deputies for Asturias
- In office 29 June 1977 – 31 August 1982

Personal details
- Born: 10 September 1934 Oviedo, Spain
- Died: 25 November 2023 (aged 89) Oviedo, Spain
- Party: UCD
- Education: University of Oviedo
- Occupation: Businessman

Alfredo Prieto Valiente (10 September 1934 – 25 November 2023) was a Spanish businessman and politician. A member of the Union of the Democratic Centre, he served in the Congress of Deputies from 1977 to 1982.

Prieto died in Oviedo on 25 November 2023, at the age of 89.
