= Eugenijus Petrovas =

Lithuanian politician (1936–2023)

Eugenijus Petrovas (Russian: Евгений Петров; 26 April 1936 – 28 November 2023) was a Lithuanian politician of Russian descent who came from Leningrad. He graduated from Šiauliai Pedagogical Institute in 1960. In 1990 he was among those who signed the Act of the Re-Establishment of the State of Lithuania. He died on 28 November 2023, at the age of 87.
