= William Davis (photographer) =

American photographer

William Davis is an American photographer based in Taos, New Mexico. Originally from High Point, North Carolina, Davis moved to Taos, New Mexico in 1969. He creates work inspired by the area. In 1979, Davis's work was published in a collaborative effort with the writer, John Nichols (The Milagro Beanfield War) in a photo-memoir “If Mountains Die”. The book helped to increase awareness of Davis's work, and in the following years his work was included in the collection of the Harwood Museum in Taos.

== Honors ==
- Selected as a Living Master for the 2007 Fall Arts Celebration Invitational Show, Taos Civic Center, Taos, NM, September–October 2007.
- Photography Award, Taos Fall Arts Celebration Invitational Show, Taos Civic Center, Taos, NM, September–October 2002, Stephen Fleming, Director of Roswell Artists-in-Residence Program; Kathleen Howe, Curator of Prints and Photography, UNM Art Museum; Barbara Lucero-Sand, Professor of Museum Studies, IAIA, Jurors.
- Photography Award, Taos Fall Arts Celebration Invitational Show, Taos Civic Center, Taos, NM, September–October 1999. Blake Larson, Roswell Museum; Mary Stephenson, Artist-In-Residence; Terry Bumpass, Governor's Gallery, Jurors.
- Curator, Pueblos of New Mexico, an exhibition of historical and contemporary photographs, Stables Art Center, Taos, NM, 1986.
- First Prize [cash award], Fall Arts Festival Photography Show, Mission Gallery, Taos, NM, 1985.
- Curator, Architecture of the Southwest, a juried and invitational photography exhibition, Stables Art Center, Taos, NM, 1984.
- Photography Award, Taos Art Association Open Awards Show, Stables Art Center, Taos, NM, 1978.
