= The Sterile Cuckoo =

1969 film by Alan J. Pakula

- Theatrical release poster
- Directed by: Alan J. Pakula
- Screenplay by: Alvin Sargent
- Based on: The Sterile Cuckoo by John Nichols
- Produced by: David Lange; Alan J. Pakula
- Starring: Liza Minnelli; Wendell Burton; Tim McIntire
- Cinematography: Milton R. Krasner
- Edited by: Sam O'Steen
- Music by: Fred Karlin
- Production company: Boardwalk Productions
- Distributed by: Paramount Pictures
- Release date: October 22, 1969
- Running time: 107 minutes
- Country: United States
- Language: English
- Box office: $14 million

The Sterile Cuckoo (released in the UK as Pookie) is a 1969 American comedy-drama film by producer-director Alan J. Pakula that tells the story of an eccentric young couple whose relationship deepens despite their differences and inadequacies. It stars Liza Minnelli, Wendell Burton, and Tim McIntire.

The film was adapted by Alvin Sargent from the 1965 novel by John Nichols, directed by Pakula in his directing debut, and was released by Paramount Pictures.

The film received two Oscar nominations for the 42nd Academy Awards: Liza Minnelli for Best Actress in a Leading Role, and Fred Karlin and Dory Previn's song "Come Saturday Morning" (performed by the Sandpipers) for Best Original Song.

== Plot ==
Mary Ann ("Pookie") Adams is a quirky oddball who meets quiet, reserved Jerry Payne while waiting for a bus heading to their colleges; both are first-year students and their colleges are near each other. Jerry notices that Pookie is different, unpredictable: she even lies to a nun on the bus so she can sit closer to him.

As Jerry settles into college life, the aggressive Pookie arrives unannounced one Saturday morning. The two spend time together over the weekend, and soon see each other regularly. Jerry falls for Pookie but their different personalities keep them apart. They agree to have sex. Later, Pookie tells Jerry she might be pregnant. When the pregnancy scare is over, Jerry invites Pookie to a large party at his college. Pookie is intimidated by the partygoers, becomes intoxicated, and loudly insults several of them, at which Jerry is angry, but he eventually forgives her.

Jerry has invited Pookie to spend Easter vacation (now referred to as spring break) with him and his family. However, he then receives warnings that he is in danger of failing some classes, so he decides not to travel to his family's home, but rather to stay alone at college to catch up on his studies. When he informs Pookie of this, and advises her that she should visit her father during spring break, she desperately begs him to allow her to spend the spring break with him instead, stating that she will not interfere with his studies. Jerry, after refusing several times, reluctantly agrees when Pookie finally breaks down about the prospect of spending time at her family home, where her father will not be present.

A week alone with the needy, somewhat unstable Pookie makes Jerry realize they need time apart. Later he discovers she has dropped out of school. In time, he finds her in the same boarding house she had rented the first time she visited him. He puts her on a bus for home and, for now, the young lovers part ways.

== Cast ==
- Liza Minnelli as Mary Ann "Pookie" Adams
- Wendell Burton as Jerry Payne
- Tim McIntire as Charlie Schumacher

== Production ==
Much of The Sterile Cuckoo was filmed at Hamilton College in Clinton, New York. Some of it was filmed in Sylvan Beach, New York, including the Sylvan Beach Union Chapel. Some scenes, including the later bus-stop scenes, were filmed at the central park in Vernon Center, New York. The first bus-stop scene was filmed in front of the Ontario State Bank Block at 300 South Euclid Avenue in Ontario, California.

== Reception ==
The Sterile Cuckoo was well received by critics. It grossed $14 million in the United States and Canada, making it the 13th highest-grossing film of 1969. Come Saturday Morning, apart from its appearance in the film, debuted in Billboard on 12/20/1969 at number 84 eventually rising to a chart high of number 17 on 6/13/1970 along with reaching #8 on the Easy Listening chart.

== Awards and nominations ==
Award	Category	Nominee(s)	Result
Academy Awards	Best Actress	Liza Minnelli	Nominated
Academy Awards	Best Song – Original for the Picture	"Come Saturday Morning"; Music by Fred Karlin; Lyrics by Dory Previn	Nominated
British Academy Film Awards	Most Promising Newcomer to Leading Film Roles	Liza Minnelli	Nominated
David di Donatello Awards	Best Foreign Actress	Liza Minnelli	Won
Golden Globe Awards	Best Actress in a Motion Picture – Drama	Liza Minnelli	Nominated
Grammy Awards	Best Original Score Written for a Motion Picture or a Television Special	Fred Karlin	Nominated
Kansas City Film Critics Circle Awards	Best Actress	Liza Minnelli	Won
Mar del Plata International Film Festival	Best Film	Alan J. Pakula	Nominated
Mar del Plata International Film Festival	Best Actress	Liza Minnelli	Won
National Society of Film Critics Awards	Best Screenplay	Alvin Sargent	3rd Place

== See also ==
- List of American films of 1969
