= John Sexton (photographer) =

American fine art photographer

John Sexton is an American fine art photographer who specializes in black and white traditional analog photography.

== Life ==
John Sexton was born in 1953. Education: Bachelor of Arts, cum laude, departmental honors, Art – Photography, Chapman University, Orange, California; Associate of Arts, with honors, Photography, Cypress College, Cypress, California

== Career ==
Sexton worked for Ansel Adams from 1979 to 1984 (when Adams died), first as Technical and Photographic Assistant, then as Technical Consultant. Sexton served as Special Projects Consultant to the Ansel Adams Publishing Rights Trust following Adams' death.

Sexton has taught at numerous photographic workshops in the past, and continues to do so, with his wife Anne Larsen, a talented photographer in her own right, through his long-running eponymous fine art photography workshop program. For many years he was a co-director of the Owens Valley Photography Workshops with fellow co-directors Bruce Barnbaum and Ray McSavaney.

Sexton also has lectured at many museums and universities. His work is in numerous permanent collections and exhibitions, and he has been the subject of many articles in the photographic press.

== Style ==
Sexton's process consists of large-format 4x5 photography and black and white silver gelatin prints. Like his mentor Ansel Adams, his prints are characterized by great tonal quality resulting from his darkroom virtuosity - Sexton provides abundant technical notes in his books. Most of Sexton's subjects are the natural world, however, unlike Adams, he is more interested in intimate scenes than wide or dramatic vistas, and often photographs them in long exposures made in the "quiet" light of dusk.

== Honors and awards ==
- International Photography Hall of Fame inductee, St. Louis, Missouri, 2018
- Telly Award - Bronze, for Videography/Cinematography, Epson America's video production, John Sexton: Print Your Legacy, 2018
- George Eastman Medal, Beijing, China, 2014
- American Society of Photographers, International Award, 2014
- SAPPI Award - Silver for Recollections: Three Decades of Photographs, 2007
- North American Nature Photography Association, Lifetime Achievement Award, 2005
- Kodak Professional Icon, 2004
- Kodak Professional Legend Online, 2000
- Cypress College, Thirtieth Anniversary Outstanding Alumnus. 1997
- Photographic Book of the Year Awards, First Place Monograph: Listen to the Trees, 1994
- Honorary Master of Science, Brooks Institute of Photography, 1990
- Imogen Cunningham Award, 1981

== Publications ==
The following books of John Sexton's work have been published:

- Recollections: Three Decades of Photographs, 2006. ISBN 0-9672188-8-8
- Places of Power: The Aesthetics of Technology, 2000. ISBN 0-9672188-1-0
- Listen to the Trees, 1994. ISBN 0-8212-1952-9
- Quiet Light, 1990. ISBN 0-8212-1775-5

== Major exhibitions ==
- John Sexton: Twenty Years of Photographs, major retrospective exhibition, Monterey Peninsula Museum of Art.
- Quiet Light, traveling exhibition organized by the United States Information Agency, toured in fifteen countries in Europe, 1994 to 1996
- Evolutions, International Center of Photography, New York City, 1991.

== Selected One Person Exhibitions ==
- International Center of Photography, New York, NY
- Monterey Museum of Art, Monterey, CA
- Center for Photographic Art, Carmel, CA
- Clarence Kennedy Gallery, Polaroid Corporation, Cambridge, MA
- Polaroid Corporation Cambridge, MA
- The Weston Gallery, Carmel, CA
- Photo Gallery International, Tokyo, Japan
- Focus Gallery, San Francisco, CA
- The Afterimage Gallery, Dallas, TX
- Photokina, Cologne, Germany
- Alinder Gallery, Gualala, CA
- Folio Gallery, Calgary, Canada
- The Ansel Adams Gallery, Yosemite National Park, CA
- Susan Spiritus Gallery, Costa Mesa, CA
- The Friends of Photography, Carmel, CA
- Kathleen Ewing Gallery, Washington, D.C.
