= The Sterile Cuckoo (novel) =

Book by John Nichols

- First edition cover
- Author: John Nichols
- Cover artist: Vivian Berger
- Language: English
- Genre: Comedy novel
- Publisher: David McKay Co. (US) & Heinemann (UK)
- Publication date: 1965
- Publication place: United States
- Media type: Print (Hardback & Paperback)
- Pages: 210 (hardback first edition)

The Sterile Cuckoo is a 1965 novel by John Nichols. It tells the story of a quirky young couple – eccentric, imaginative Pookie Adams and conventional, unimaginative Jerry Payne – whose relationship deepens despite their differences, but eventually falls apart. It is largely set at an eastern college in the early 1960s.

The title comes from a nonsense poem that Pookie writes near the end of the novel, after she and Jerry have made a suicide pact:

Oh, Hi-ho in the Lavender Woods / A Sterile Cuckoo is crying;

Oh, Hi-ho in the Lavender Woods / A Sterile Cuckoo is dying;

Cuckoo! Cuckoo! / Cuckoo! Cuckoo!

In the real dark night of the soul it's always three o'clock in the morning. (F. S. Fitz[gerald] – P. Adams)

== Book summary ==
When 18-year-old Jerry Payne first meets Pookie Adams at the bus depot in Friarsburg, Oklahoma, he is hardly aware that this moment marks the beginning of the most memorable love affair of his life. Overwhelmed (and yet secretly enchanted) by her zany, rambling monologue, Jerry is relieved to leave her in St. Louis as he continues to New York. Thinking he's seen the last of her, he heads off to college, only to be pursued by seventeen lengthy letters, and before he knows it he is involved with a seemingly crazy, startlingly honest girl who adores him. During the next two years, Pookie helps Jerry leave behind the fun-seeking, beer-blasted fraternity man he has become, as she teaches him to open his heart to her. Then, almost as suddenly as she appeared in his life, she disappears from it, leaving in her wake an eternal trail of love and wonder.

A 1969 film version of the novel was adapted by Alvin Sargent and directed by Alan J. Pakula. It starred Liza Minnelli and Wendell Burton.
