= Bernard Lewinsky =

American physician

- Born: Bernard Salomon Lewinsky; January 10, 1943 (age 83); San Salvador, El Salvador
- Education: University of California, Berkeley; University of Oregon; University of California, Irvine
- Occupations: Physician, medical researcher
- Spouses: Marcia Kaye Vilensky (m. 1969; div. 1987) Barbara Lynn Lerner (m. 1987)
- Children: 2, including Monica

Bernard Salomon Lewinsky (born January 10, 1943) is a Salvadoran-born American physician and medical researcher. He is also a photographer, and many of his photographs are displayed at medical offices. He organized a legal defense fund for his daughter Monica during an inquiry into her relationship with President Bill Clinton.

== Early life and education ==
Lewinsky's parents, Susi and George Lewinsky, were German Jews who left Germany in the 1920s, and settled in El Salvador with the help of Consul José Castellanos Contreras. His mother was from Hamburg. Both of them were highly involved in the arts, with his mother being a landscape painter and his father a violinist. Lewinsky was born in San Salvador. During his childhood, Lewinsky was interested in photography, but after the family moved to the United States in 1957 when he was 14, he turned to medicine. His interest in photography renewed in 1987, when he began using photographs in his radiology practice and going to photography workshops. In 1976, he joined the Sinai Temple.

Lewinsky attended the University of California, Berkeley, obtaining a Bachelor of Science in biology. He next attended the University of Oregon for a Master of Science in biology in 1965. Finally, he received his medical degree in 1969 at the University of California, Irvine. His medical internship was at the Los Angeles County+USC Medical Center. Then he spent two years in the army as Chief of Radiation Therapy Services at the Letterman Army Hospital, for which he was awarded a Commendation Medal. After his schooling and training was complete, he began working in 1977 at the Western Tumor Medical Group as a junior assistant. In 1978 Lewinsky became a partner with the group. That same year, he helped open a new facility in West Hills and in 1990 another facility in Valencia. He has worked with the group ever since, becoming its president in 1994. After the other partners sold their stakes to Lewinsky, he became the sole proprietor.

== Medical career ==
Lewinsky is a board-certified radiation oncologist who is among the top 15% of breast cancer researchers in terms of publication volume, according to Vitals.com. He was the President and owner of West Hills Radiation Therapy Center. Lewinsky is a Fellow of the American College of Radiology and also serves on the Medical Advisory Board of The Wellness Community Valley/Ventura, a cancer support organization.

Lewinsky has studied non-surgical cancer treatments that aim to reduce the number of treatments that patients receive. He has also partnered with a veterinarian oncologist to help treat animals with cancer. Lewinsky has published a number of medical papers in collaboration with several other scientists that focus on breast cancer. He has also been published in various textbooks.

His earliest job in oncology was a residency at Mount Zion Hospital in San Francisco, California.

== Photography ==
Lewinsky is also an accomplished photographer. His photographs are displayed in a "healing art gallery" at the West Hills radiation therapy center plus 20 medical offices across the country. Lewinsky has published a book of his photographs titled Nature – Our Healing Partner that is primarily aimed at his patients. The proceeds from its sale benefit the American Cancer Society. In January 2002, a number of his works were featured at the G. Ray Hawkins Gallery in an exhibit titled "The Healing Arts". Divided into two parts, one "focus[ed] entirely on work that Lewinsky has done for his treatment center", while the second featured "work borrowed from hospitals across the country"."

In order to learn to be a better photographer, Lewinsky attended workshops by famous photographers such as Howard Bond, John Sexton, Ray McSavaney, and Tom Morse. Lewinsky has stated that one whose photography he attempted to emulate in his early efforts was Ansel Adams.

== Personal life ==
Lewinsky married Marcia Kaye Vilensky (born 1949), his first wife, in 1969. They had two children—Monica, in 1973, and Michael, in 1977. The couple divorced in 1987.

From 1995–1997, his daughter Monica was involved in a relationship with then-President Bill Clinton. Lewinsky organized a legal defense fund for his daughter, announcing it on the Today Show. In a 1998 CNN interview, he described Monica's defense attorney William H. Ginsburg as a "close friend", and spoke out against government and media scrutiny of his daughter.
