= Sylvan Beach Union Chapel =

Historic church in New York, United States

- U.S. National Register of Historic Places
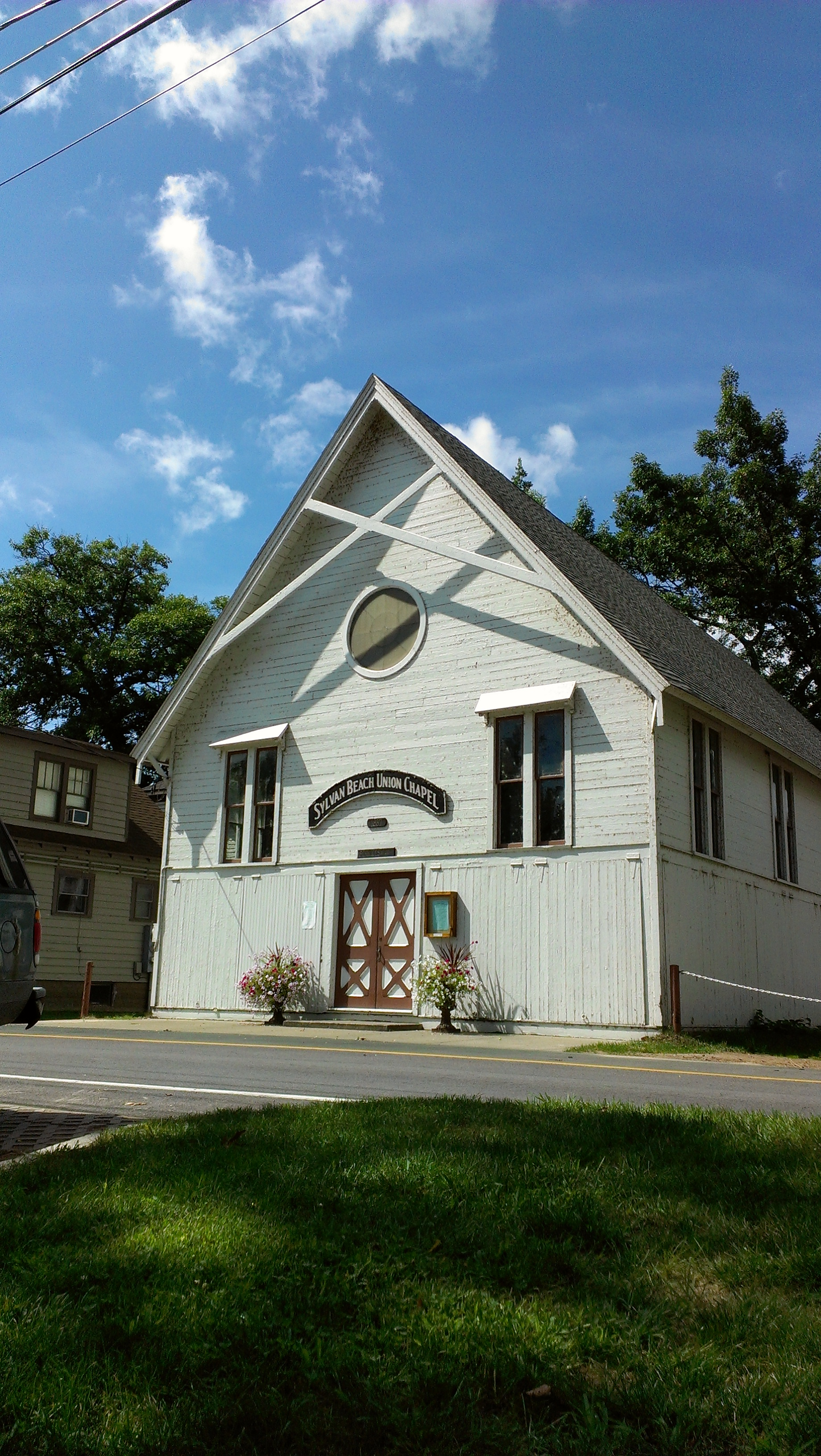
- Sylvan Beach Union Chapel

- Location within New York Location within the United States
- Location: 805 Park Ave., Sylvan Beach, New York
- Coordinates: 43°11′57″N 75°43′47″W
- Built: 1887
- NRHP reference No.: 09000560
- Added to NRHP: July 24, 2009

Sylvan Beach Union Chapel is a historic interdenominational church building located at Sylvan Beach in Oneida County, New York. It opened on July 3, 1887, and worship services have been held there every summer since then. The film The Sterile Cuckoo starring Liza Minnelli was shot in part at the church.

It was listed on the National Register of Historic Places in 2009.
