= Anne Pitoniak =

American actress (1922–2007)

Anne Lillian Pitoniak
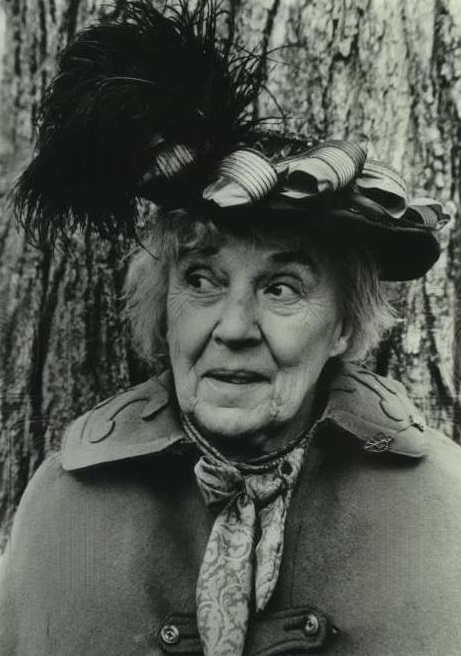
- Pitoniak in 1987
- Born: March 30, 1922; Westfield, Massachusetts, U.S.
- Died: April 22, 2007 (aged 85); New York City, New York, U.S.
- Education: University of North Carolina at Greensboro
- Occupation: Actress
- Spouse: Jerome Milord

Anne Pitoniak (March 30, 1922 – April 22, 2007) was an American actress. She was nominated twice for Broadway's Tony Award as Best Actress (Play) in 1983 for 'night, Mother and as Best Actress (Featured Role – Play) in 1994 for a revival of William Inge's Picnic. She is best known for her roles in The Survivors (1983), Housekeeping (1987), Hiding Out (1987), and Where the Money Is (2000).

== Early life and education ==
Pitoniak was born in Westfield, Massachusetts, the daughter of Sophie (née Porubovic) and John Pitoniak. She was a graduate of the University of North Carolina at Greensboro.

== Career ==
Pitoniak spent two years as a civilian actress immediately after World War II, touring Japan, the Philippines and Korea for the Special Services.

In 'night, Mother she played a mother who tries to talk her grown daughter out of suicide. The play premiered at the American Repertory Theatre in Cambridge, Massachusetts, before moving to Broadway. Pitoniak and co-star Kathy Bates received Best Actress Tony Award nominations for their work. In 1994, Pitoniak received a second Tony nomination for her performance as Helen Potts in the Roundabout Theatre Company's revival of Picnic. She also appeared on Broadway in Agnes of God, The Octette Bridge Club, Amy's View, Uncle Vanya, Dance of Death, and Imaginary Friends.

Pitoniak performed regularly at the Actors Theatre of Louisville for five years, appearing in plays such as Norman's Getting Out, D.L. Coburn's The Gin Game, and Jane Martin's Middle Aged White Guys. She also worked steadily in film and television, including the 1983 comedy film The Survivors, the 1987 comedic drama films Housekeeping and Hiding Out and the 2000 comedy-drama crime film Where the Money Is. Pitoniak also had a supporting role in the 1985 film version of Agnes of God, where she played the mother of Jane Fonda's character after previously playing Mother Miriam Ruth in the Broadway version.

In 1987, Pitoniak played the role of Mary in the 1987 Cheers episode "Pudd'n Head Boyd". In 1988, she played Cornelia in The Wizard of Loneliness. In 2001, she played the role of Mrs. Berry in the Law and Order: SVU episode "Redemption".

== Personal life ==
Pitoniak met her future husband, Jerome Milord, then a soldier, when they were in a United Service Organizations show in Japan. She died from cancer at her home in Manhattan at age 85.

== Filmography ==
=== Film ===
Year	Title	Role	Notes
1983	The Survivors	Betty	
1984	Old Enough	Katherine	
1985	Agnes of God	Dr. Livingston's Mother	
1987	Sister, Sister	Mrs. Bettlehelm	
1987	Best Seller	Mrs. Foster	
1987	Housekeeping	Aunt Lily	
1987	Hiding Out	Grandma Jennie	
1988	The Wizard of Loneliness	Cornelia	
1989	Old Gringo	Mrs. Winslow	
1991	The Ballad of the Sad Café	Mrs. McPhail	
1991	V.I. Warshawski	Lotty	
1993	House of Cards	Judge	
1996	Bed of Roses	Grandma Jean	
1997	Julian Po	Mrs. Danforth	
1997	A Thousand Acres	Mary Livingstone	
1999	The Opportunists	Aunt Dee	
2000	Where the Money Is	Mrs. Tetlow	
2002	Unfaithful	Grandma	

=== Television ===
Year	Title	Role	Notes
1960	The Robert Herridge Theater	Mother's Voice	Episode: "All the Petals of All the Roses in the World"
1984	A Doctor's Story	Gray Lady	Television film
1984–1985	AfterMASH	Mildred Potter	9 episodes
1984–1989	American Playhouse	Various roles	3 episodes
1985	Hill Street Blues	Mrs. Louise Tripp	Episode: "Intestinal Fortitude"
1985	The Equalizer	Lilly	Episode: "Back Home"
1986	Miracle of the Heart: A Boys Town Story	Maggie Scott	Television film
1987	Cheers	Mary	Episode: "Pudd'n Head Boyd"
1988	CBS Summer Playhouse	Mom	Episode: "Whattley by the Bay"
1989	No Place Like Home	Opal	Television film
1990	H.E.L.P.	Mrs. McKee	Episode: "Are You There, Alpha Centauri?"
1990	Working Girl	Mrs. Levitsky	Episode: "I Heard It Through the Grapevine"
1992	Down the Shore	Mrs. Krell	Episode: "Hitting Mrs. Krell"
1994	In the Best of Families	Nanna Newsom	Miniseries
1996	New York Undercover	Mrs. Haggard	Episode: "Tough Love"
1996	The Christmas Tree	Mother Superior Frances	Television film
1998	ER	Ruth Johnson	Episode: "Good Luck, Ruth Johnson"
1998	Grace and Glorie	Bernice Wallace	Television film
1998	Trinity	Mrs. Burris	Episode: "...To Forgive, Divine"
1999	Becker	Tillie	Episode: "Love! Lies! Bleeding!"
2001, 2005	Law & Order: Special Victims Unit	Mrs. Larson / Mrs. Berry	2 episodes
2000–2002	Third Watch	Mrs. Irene Sullivan	4 episodes
