= The Wizard of Loneliness =

1966 novel by John Nichols

- First edition (publ. G. P. Putnam's Sons)
- Author: John Nichols
- Language: English
- Publication date: 1966

The Wizard of Loneliness is a 1966 book written by John Nichols. It's about a boy's experiences on the home front during World War II. A film adaptation was released in 1988.

Synopsis: In World War II, young Wendall Oler is sent to live with his father's family in Vermont. Using this opportunity to act out his resentment for the death of his mother, he does all he can to tyrannize them. But as he grows on his aunt, he begins to feel increasingly at home.
