= The Wizard of Loneliness (film) =

- Directed by: Jenny Bowen
- Written by: Nancy Larson; Jenny Bowen
- Based on: The Wizard of Loneliness by John Nichols
- Produced by: Thom Tyson
- Starring: Lukas Haas; Lea Thompson; Lance Guest; Dylan Baker; John Randolph
- Cinematography: Richard Bowen
- Edited by: Lisa Day
- Production companies: Virgin Vision; American Playhouse Theatrical Films
- Distributed by: Skouras Pictures
- Release date: September 2, 1988
- Running time: 111 minutes
- Country: United States
- Language: English
- Budget: $2.4 million
- Box office: $144,566

The Wizard of Loneliness is a 1988 American drama film directed by Jenny Bowen and starring Lukas Haas, Lea Thompson, Lance Guest, Dylan Baker, and John Randolph. It is based on the 1966 book of the same name by John Nichols.

== Premise ==
Young Wendall Oler is sent to live with his Aunt Sybil and Uncle John when his father is called on to fight in World War II. Lonely and unhappy, Wendall harbors the delusion that he possesses amazing powers and becomes involved in some family secrets.

== Cast ==
- Lukas Haas as Wendall Oler
- Lea Thompson as Aunt Sybil
- Lance Guest as Uncle John
- Dylan Baker as Duffy Kahler
- John Randolph as Doc
- David Moscow as Jimmy Wiggen
- Anne Pitoniak as Cornelia
- Jason Cook as Monroe
- Ken Jenkins as Joel Spender
- Michael Buhl as Chad Spender

== Critical reception ==
Critic Rita Kempley wrote in The Washington Post that the film "is Rockwell with angst, a dour but cutesy drama" with "bad special effects," and described the title character as "a mean-spirited, Walter Mittyish 12-year-old," a "sullen brat," and "nowhere near as lonely as the folks selling tickets will be."
