= The Milagro Beanfield War (novel) =

1974 novel by John Nichols

- Author: John Nichols
- Language: English
- Publication date: 1974

The Milagro Beanfield War is a novel by American writer John Nichols, published in 1974 by Random House. It is the first book in Nichols's New Mexico Trilogy and is set in the early 1970s in Milagro, New Mexico and its environs, including Chamisaville and Donya Luz. Developer Ladd Devine, backed by town and state leaders, seeks to turn the Miracle Valley Recreation Area into a potentially lucrative upscale vacation resort by building the Indian Creek Dam and establishing the Indian Creek Conservancy District. Most residents of Milagro live in severe poverty and are suspicious of this effort, but do not understand the implications of proceeding with the development, which hinges on Devine's securing necessary land and water rights. Joe Mondragon, a ne'er-do-well town resident, sets off the conflict that drives the plot by illegally irrigating his bean field. The forces supporting Ladd Devine's project attempt to put a stop to Mondragon's actions without inflaming tensions of the townspeople, which could derail the development. A discussion of land and water rights issues underlying the novel may be found in an Encyclopedia.com entry.

In 1988 Robert Redford directed a feature film version of the novel.

== Reception ==
Reviews of the book were mixed. Kirkus Reviews called the book "More alive than a grasshopper on a hot skillet", "full of good humor" and "comic drive". However, Frederick Busch, writing in The New York Times, states "Nichols's attempt to make his love for an area and his social concern coincide with his often celebrated sense of humor is doomed by his own always visible hand." He criticizes the prose as slack and the characters as stereotypical.
