= John Nichols (writer) =

American novelist (1940–2023)

- Born: John Treadwell Nichols; July 23, 1940; Berkeley, California, U.S.
- Died: November 27, 2023 (aged 83); Taos, New Mexico, U.S.
- Education: Hamilton College
- Occupation: Novelist
- Children: 2
- Relatives: William Weld (cousin); John Treadwell Nichols (grandfather); Anatole Le Braz (great-grandfather); Tina Weymouth (second cousin); Yann Weymouth (second cousin)
- Writing career
- Period: 1965–2022

John Treadwell Nichols (July 23, 1940 – November 27, 2023) was an American novelist. He wrote the New Mexico Trilogy - The Milagro Beanfield War (1974), The Magic Journey (1978), and The Nirvana Blues (1981) - as well as numerous other works of fiction and nonfiction.

== Early life ==
Nichols was born in Berkeley, California, in 1940. He was the grandson of ichthyologist John Treadwell Nichols and a first cousin of Massachusetts politician William Weld. His mother, who died when Nichols was two years old, was from France but spent much of her childhood in Spain. He moved frequently as a child, and graduated from Hamilton College in 1962.

== Writing career ==
=== Fiction ===
After graduating, he lived in Spain with his grandmother, where he wrote his first novel, The Sterile Cuckoo, which was published in 1965. He lived in Guatemala in the mid-1960s. This period was heavily influential on his political development. The Associated Press said his work was defined by an emphasis on social justice, and noted that he described himself as a "liberation ecologist". Nichols later returned to the United States, living in SoHo, Manhattan for a short time before settling in Taos, New Mexico in 1969.

Nichols was the author of the "New Mexico trilogy", a series about the complex relationship among history, race and ethnicity, and land and water rights in the fictional town of Chamisaville, New Mexico. The trilogy consists of The Milagro Beanfield War (which was adapted into a movie of the same title directed by Robert Redford), The Magic Journey, and The Nirvana Blues.

Two of his other novels have been made into films. The Sterile Cuckoo was adapted for a film by Alan J. Pakula in 1969. The Wizard of Loneliness was published in 1966, and the film version with Lukas Haas was made in 1988. He also had a hand, uncredited due to a decision in an arbitration with the Writers Guild, in the Oscar-winning Best Adapted Screenplay for Costa-Gavras' 1982 film Missing.

=== Non-fiction ===
Nichols also has written non-fiction, including the trilogy If Mountains Die, The Last Beautiful Days of Autumn and On the Mesa. After arriving in Taos in 1969, Nichols remained in northern New Mexico until his death. His last book was the memoir I Got Mine: Confessions of a Midlist Writer, published in 2022. He is the subject of a feature documentary by director Kurt Jacobsen and co-producer Warren Leming entitled The Milagro Man: The Irrepressible Multicultural Life and Literary Times of John Nichols, which premiered at the 2012 Albuquerque Film Festival and screened at a dozen more film festivals.

== Photography ==
Nichols was also a photographer. Many of his photographs appear in his book On the Mesa, among others. He also participated as an instructor in fine art photographic workshops, most notably with the Los Angeles photographer Ray McSavaney. He was long-time political activist for progressive and especially environmental causes.

== Personal life and death ==
Nichols was married three times, with the marriages ending in divorce. He had two children from his first marriage.

Nichols died from heart failure at his home in Taos on November 27, 2023, aged 83.

== Published works ==
=== Novels ===
- The Sterile Cuckoo. David McKay Company, Inc. 1965.
- The Wizard of Loneliness. Putnams. 1966.
- New Mexico Trilogy
  - The Milagro Beanfield War. Holt, Rinehart and Winston. 1974.
  - The Magic Journey. Holt, Rinehart, and Winston. 1978. ISBN 9780345310491.
  - The Nirvana Blues. Holt, Rinehart, and Winston. 1981. ISBN 9780345304650.
- A Ghost in the Music. Holt, Rinehart, and Winston. 1979. ISBN 9780030425769.
- American Blood. Henry Holt & Co. 1987.
- An Elegy for September. Henry Holt & Co. 1992. ISBN 9780805019940.
- Conjugal Bliss: A Comedy of Martial Arts. Henry Holt & Co. 1994.
- The Voice of the Butterfly. Chronicle Books. 2001. ISBN 9780811832014.
- The Empanada Brotherhood. Chronicle Books. 2007.
- On Top Of Spoon Mountain. University of New Mexico Press. 2012.
- The Annual Big Arsenic Fishing Contest!. University of New Mexico Press. 2016.
- Goodbye, Monique. Acequia Madre Press. 2019.

=== Non-fiction ===
- Non-fiction trilogy
  - If Mountains Die: A New Mexico Memoir. With William Davis (photographer). Knopf. 1979.
  - The Last Beautiful Days of Autumn. Henry Holt & Co. 1982.
  - On the Mesa. Gibbs Smith. 1986.
- A Fragile Beauty: John Nichols' Milagro Country. Gibbs Smith. 1987.
- Keep It Simple: A Defense of the Earth. Norton. 1992.
- Dancing on the Stones: Selected Essays. University of New Mexico Press. 2000.
- An American Child Supreme: The Education of a Liberation Ecologist. Milkweed Editions. 2001. ISBN 9781571312532.
- I Got Mine: Confessions of a Midlist Writer University of New Mexico Press 2022
