= Sylvan Beach, New York =

- Village
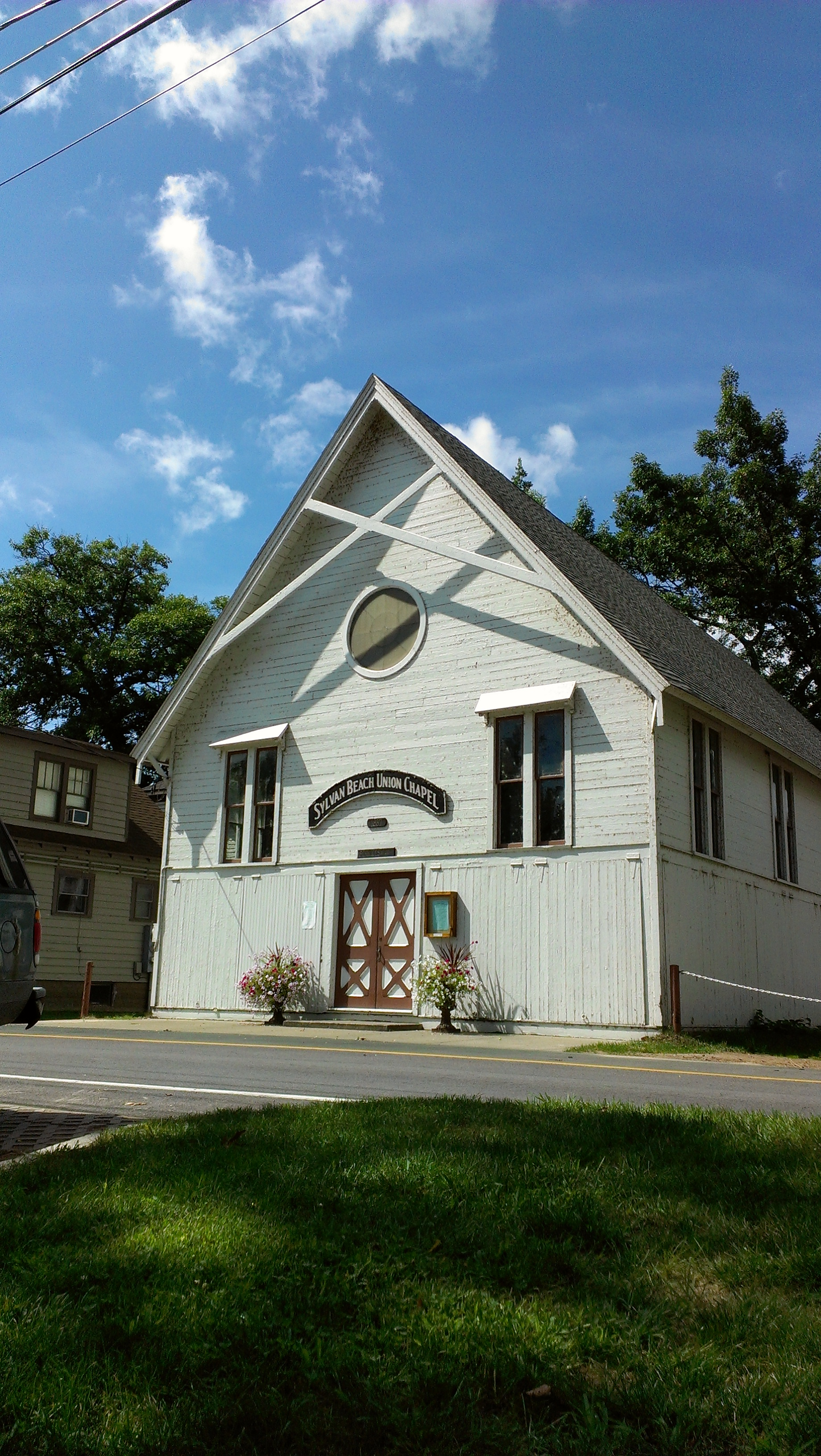
- Sylvan Beach Union Chapel

- Location in Oneida County and the state of New York.
- Coordinates: 43°12′16″N 75°43′35″W
- Country: United States
- State: New York
- County: Oneida

Area
  - Total: 0.71 sq mi (1.83 km^{2})
  - Land: 0.69 sq mi (1.78 km^{2})
  - Water: 0.019 sq mi (0.05 km^{2})
- Elevation: 374 ft (114 m)

Population (2020)
  - Total: 890
  - Density: 1,296.4/sq mi (500.54/km^{2})
- Time zone: UTC-5 (Eastern (EST))
  - Summer (DST): UTC-4 (EDT)
- ZIP Codes: 13157 (Sylvan Beach); 13308 (Blossvale)
- Area code: 315
- FIPS code: 36-72521
- GNIS feature ID: 0966955
- Website: www.villageofsylvanbeachny.gov

Sylvan Beach is a village in Oneida County, New York, United States; in the southeastern end of the Town of Vienna. It is twenty-two miles west of downtown Rome. As of the 2020 census, Sylvan Beach had a population of 890.

== History ==
Before European exploration began, the area was used by Native Americans, mostly for its supply of fish. Many of the areas surrounding Oneida Lake have actually been bearers of artifacts that have helped us learn more about Native Americans. The Oneidas and the Onondagas, of the Iroquois Confederacy chose to settle in the Oneida Lake region.

The community was founded around 1840. Public transportation, in the form of railroads and ferries, made the village a desirable resort community since the 19th century. The Village of Sylvan Beach was incorporated in 1971.

The Sylvan Beach Union Chapel was listed on the National Register of Historic Places in 2009.

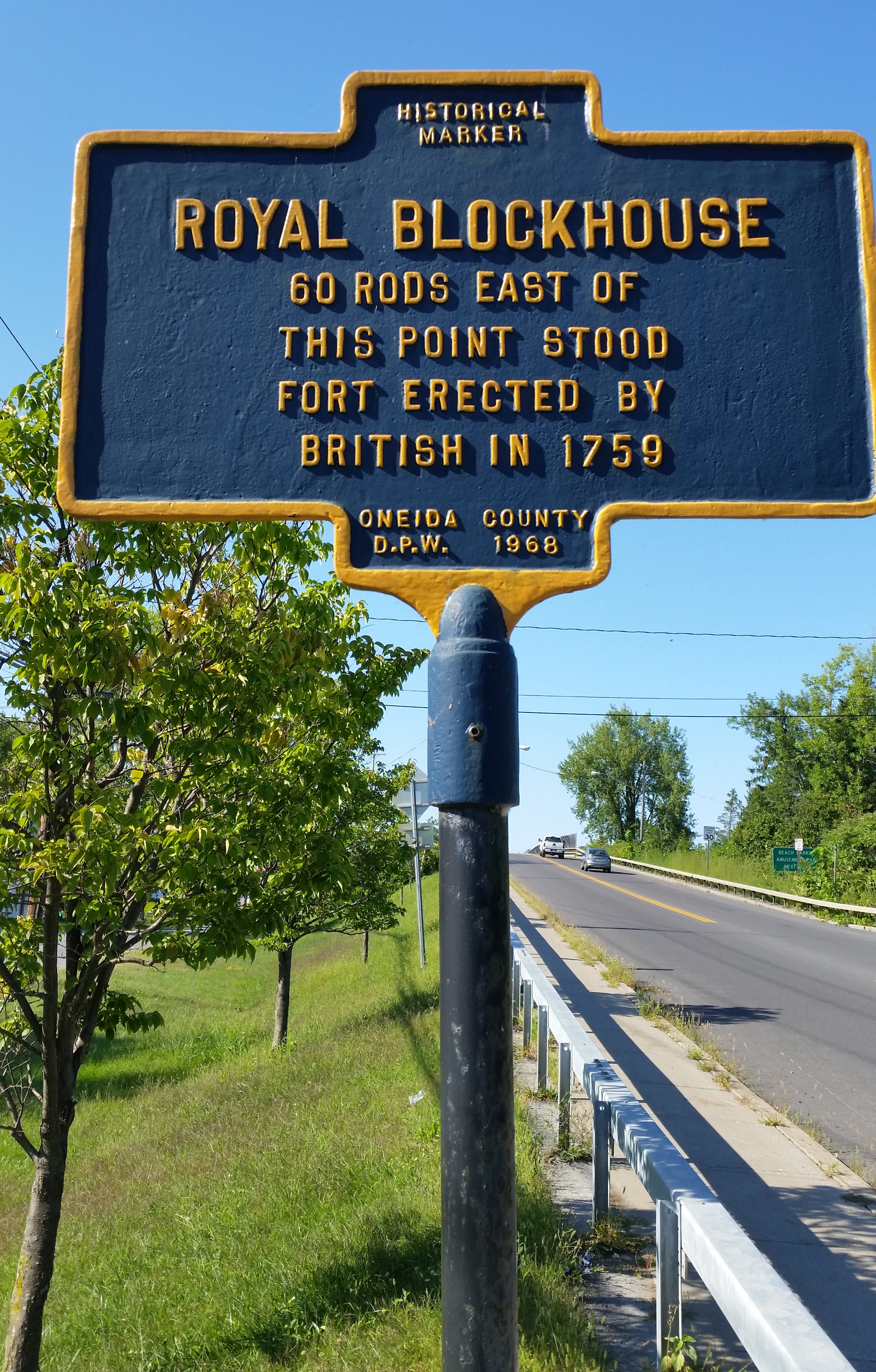
Historical marker

== Geography ==
Sylvan Beach is located at 43°12′16″N 75°43′35″W (43.204358, -75.726428).

According to the United States Census Bureau, the village has a total area of 0.8 square miles (2.1 km^{2}), of which 0.7 square miles (1.8 km^{2}) is land and 0.04 square miles (0.10 km^{2}) (3.95%) is water.

Sylvan Beach is on the eastern shore of Oneida Lake and is adjacent to the Erie Canal, which made the village a convenient shipping port for all of the lake in the 1820s.

== Demographics ==
Historical population
| Census | Pop. | Note | %± |
|---|---|---|---|
| 1980 | 1,243 | | — |
| 1990 | 1,119 | | −10.0% |
| 2000 | 1,071 | | −4.3% |
| 2010 | 897 | | −16.2% |
| 2020 | 890 | | −0.8% |
U.S. Decennial Census

As of the census of 2018, there were 896 people, 495 households, and 284 families residing in the village. The population density was 1,458.4 inhabitants per square mile (563.1/km^{2}). There were 847 housing units at an average density of 1,153.4 per square mile (445.3/km^{2}). The racial makeup of the village was 97.76% White, 0.75% African American, 0.19% Native American, 0.28% Asian, 0.37% from other races, and 0.65% from two or more races. Hispanic or Latino of any race were 0.65% of the population.

There were 495 households, out of which 24.6% had children under the age of 18 living with them, 44.3% were married couples living together, 9.7% had a female householder with no husband present, and 40.7% were non-families. 30.3% of all households were made up of individuals, and 12.1% had someone living alone who was 65 years of age or older. The average household size was 2.27 and the average family size was 2.83.

In the village, the population was spread out, with 21.5% under the age of 18, 6.9% from 18 to 24, 27.3% from 25 to 44, 30.1% from 45 to 64, and 14.3% who were 65 years of age or older. The median age was 41 years. For every 100 females, there were 105.6 males. For every 100 females age 18 and over, there were 103.1 males. In the city's population, 49.5% are males and 50.5% are females.

The median income for a household in the village was $30,978, and the median income for a family was $35,250. Males had a median income of $30,250 versus $18,625 for females. The per capita income for the village was $15,876. About 13.2% of families and 17.0% of the population were below the poverty line, including 25.1% of those under age 18 and 13.5% of those age 65 or over.

The total amount of housing is 946. Of those, 34.4% of those homes are used for recreational, seasonal, or occasional use (which is 325 homes). 46.6% of houses in the beach are vacant, which adds up to 441 homes. 2.7% of homes are for rent and 2.0% are for sale totaling 45 homes.

== Recreation ==
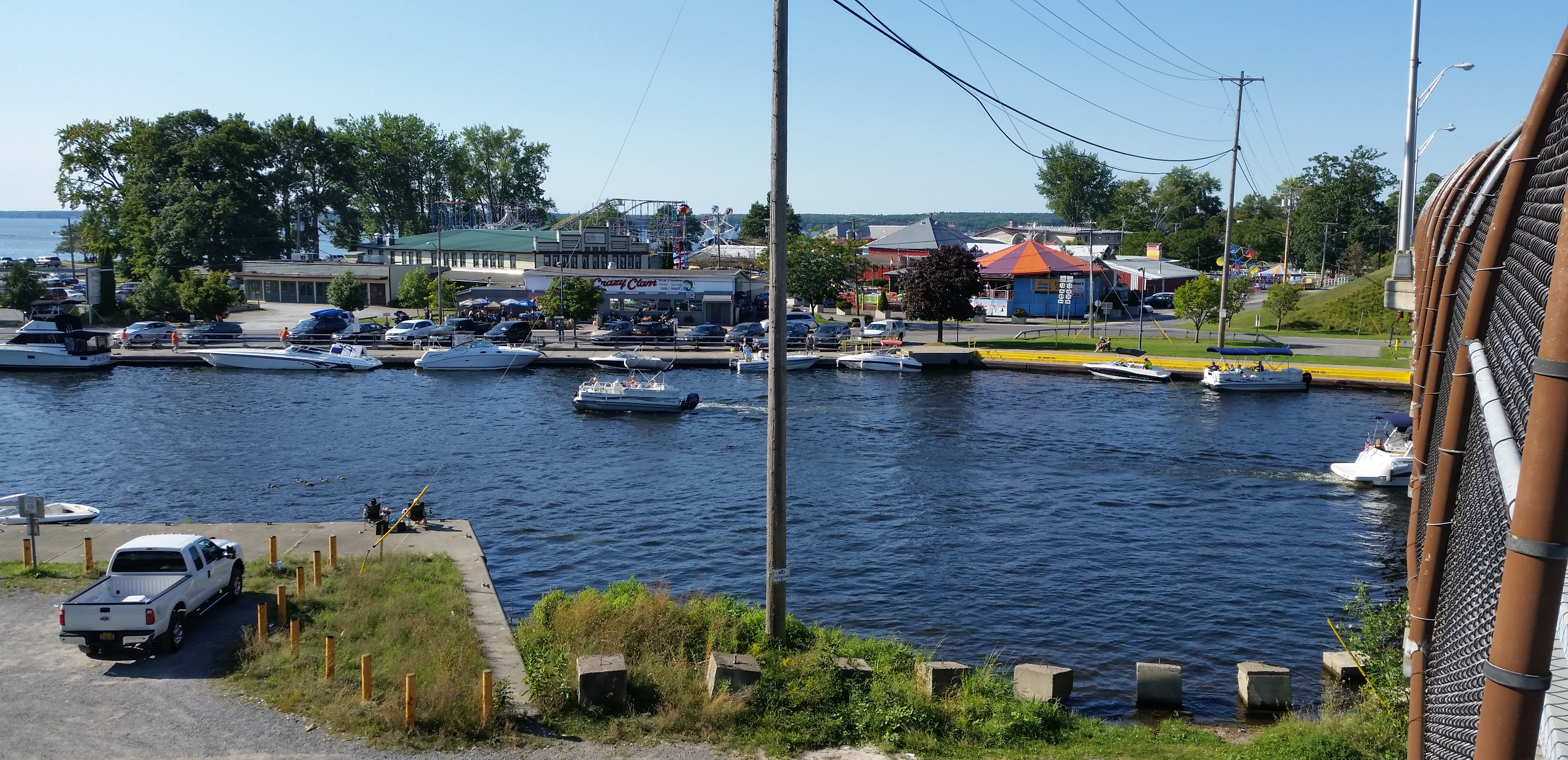
Sylvan Beach, New York, with amusement park in near background, Erie Canal in the foreground, and Oneida Lake in the distant background.

The village is home to a mile long beach, bandstand, a variety of restaurants and shops, casino, hotel-style villas for rent, amusement park, camping facilities and marinas, Situated on the eastern shore of Oneida Lake, the village attracts many boaters and fishing enthusiasts. In the summer there are many different events and many places to eat. In the summer, every Tuesday "Bikes at the Beach", Wednesday night summer concert series, Thursday night Classic Cars at the Beach and Pirates Weekend, Canal Fest, Jeeps at the Beach, Corvettes at the Beach to name a few.
