= Wendell Burton =

American actor

- Born: Wendell Ray Burton; July 21, 1947; San Antonio, Texas, U.S.
- Died: May 30, 2017 (aged 69); Houston, Texas, U.S.
- Occupations: Actor; Television executive
- Spouse(s): Patricia Nann (1978–?) (divorced); Linda Dena (2004–his death)
- Children: 2 (with Nann)

Wendell Ray Burton (July 21, 1947 – May 30, 2017) was an American television executive and actor. He is best known for his co-starring role with Liza Minnelli in the 1969 movie The Sterile Cuckoo (1969).

== Biography ==
Burton was born in San Antonio, Texas, the son of an Air Force sergeant who died when his son was five years old. He became involved in college theatricals while a student at Sonoma State College (later known as Sonoma State University). His acting career began when he won the title role in the San Francisco stage production of You're a Good Man, Charlie Brown. During the run of that successful musical, he continued his education and transferred to San Francisco State University, where he took classes in acting and directing. While performing in You're a Good Man, Charlie Brown, Burton was seen by director Alan J. Pakula and was chosen over hundreds of more experienced movie actors to star opposite Liza Minnelli in the role as Jerry Payne, the young college student with whom she falls in love in The Sterile Cuckoo (1969).

In 1970, he went on the road with the national touring company of Leonard Gershe's Broadway hit Butterflies Are Free, co-starring opposite Eve Arden as her son. Burton accepted the role as Smitty in the Metro-Goldwyn-Mayer drama film Fortune and Men's Eyes (1971), portraying an inmate who was raped shortly after entering prison, then turned into a sexual predator himself. Turning to television, he played the role of Fred Kramer, an innocent man framed for murder, in the well-received TV movie Murder Once Removed (1971). In 1973, he reprised his role as "Charlie Brown" in the Hallmark Hall of Fame TV adaptation of the musical. That same year, he appeared in the role as Joel Clements in the anti-drug TV movie Go Ask Alice co-starring William Shatner and Ruth Roman. He played the role as Pvt. Wilson in a TV adaptation of The Red Badge of Courage (1974).

Among his guest appearances on television, Burton appeared on Medical Center, Longstreet, Room 222, Love, American Style, The Rookies, and Kung Fu. He also played Dick Van Dyke and Hope Lange's son for one episode of The New Dick Van Dyke Show. His career began to wane in the 1980s due to the quality of roles offered and his turning down roles he deemed morally unsuitable. In 1986, he played "Osgood", a mild-mannered man who fights Burt Reynolds in the big screen action crime drama Heat. He taught acting for a time in Hollywood. Burton began working in ad sales for TV in 1988, and eventually became the West Coast Director of Sales for the Family Channel.

== Personal life ==
In 1977, Burton embraced evangelical Christianity and associated with the Vineyard Christian Fellowship under Pastor Kenn Gulliksen in Los Angeles. On September 23, 1978, he and Patricia Nann were married in Los Angeles. They had two children, Haven Burton (born February 22, 1980), an actress, and Adam Burton (born May 30, 1983), a musician. In 1995, after his divorce, his career took a turn. He worked in online sales until 1997, when he moved to Houston and helped launch a local independent TV station. During this time he also became the Director of Creative Ministries at Lakewood Church, where he met Linda Dena. On November 13, 2004, he and Linda Dena were married in Houston.

Burton lived in Houston. There, he served as a Senior Director of the Champions Network, an association of pastors linked with Joel Osteen and the Lakewood Church which gives recommendations of local Champions Network churches to broadcast viewers. He also served as Drama Director at Lakewood Church. He died from brain cancer at his home in Houston on May 30, 2017.

== Partial filmography ==
- The Sterile Cuckoo (1969) – Jerry Payne
- Fortune and Men's Eyes (1971) – Smitty
- You're a Good Man, Charlie Brown (1973) – Charlie Brown
- Go Ask Alice (1973) – Joel
- Goodnight Jackie (1974) – Robbie
- Heat (1986) – Osgood
