= Ray McSavaney =

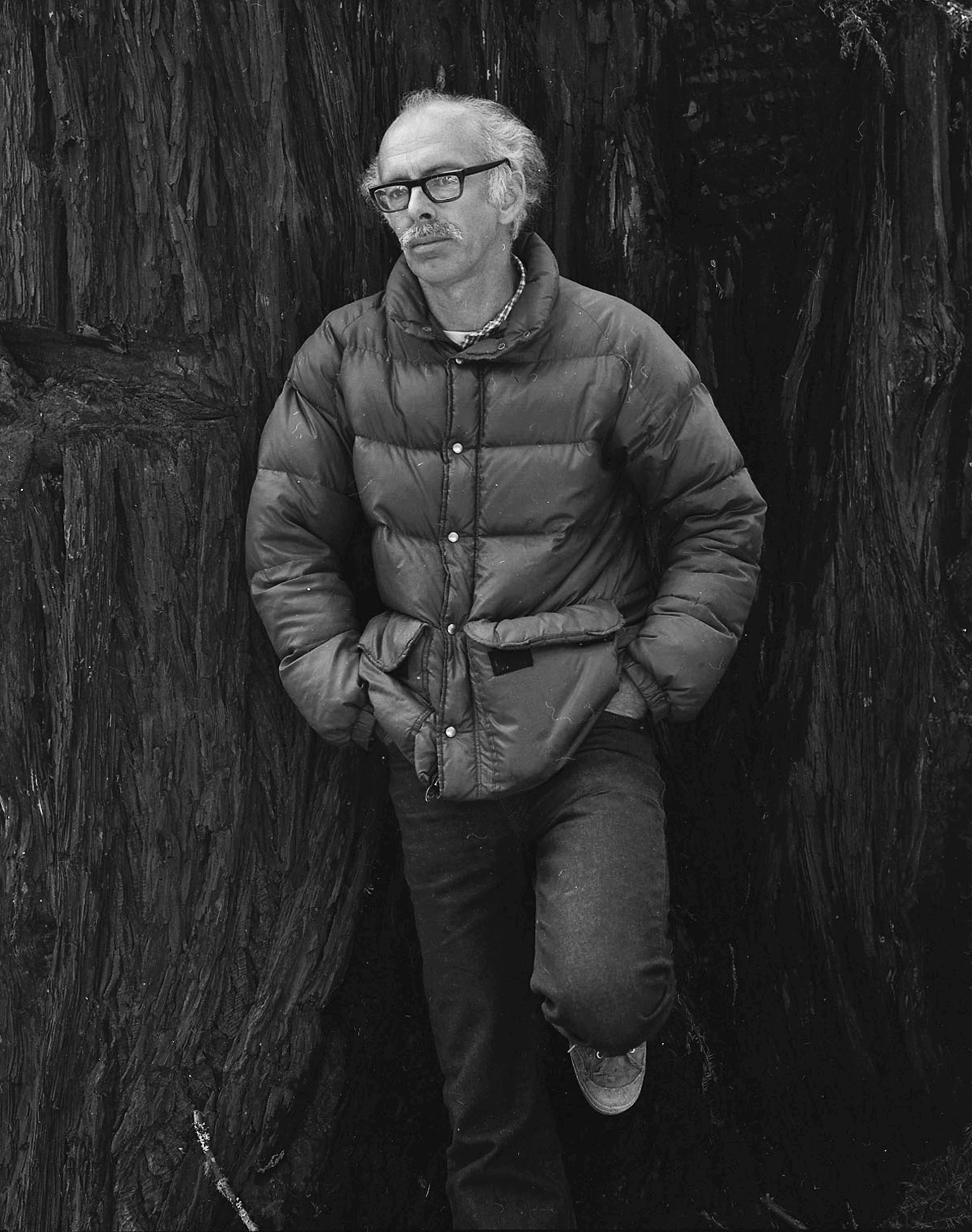
- Ray McSavaney, 1983 by Christopher Purcell
- Born: Ray McSavaney; December 18, 1938; Los Angeles, California
- Died: July 2, 2014 (aged 75); Los Angeles, California
- Education: University of California, Los Angeles, 1963; B.A.
- Occupations: Fine Art Photographer, Teacher
- Known for: Black & White Photography: Urban scenes; Southwest Landscapes and Anasazi Ruins, Studio botanical arrangements
- Website: raymcsavaneyphotography.com

Ray McSavaney (December 18, 1938 – July 2, 2014) was an American fine-art photographer based in Los Angeles, California. Throughout a spartan but active life, practicing classical Western black and white fine art photography, he made enduring photographs of buildings, bridges, and street scenes of the vast city, ancient ruins and panoramic vistas of the Southwest, and studio setups with varied floral subjects. He died from lymphoma in Los Angeles Veteran's Hospital. Warm tributes to his life and career by some of his close friends and colleagues appear in a ‘celebration of life’ memorial recounted in ‘View Camera’ magazine.

== Early life and education ==
=== Urban planner ===
Born to suburban Los Angeles parents, McSavaney became aware of the visual arts — as did most kids of that era — from the comics, newspaper pictures, free merchandizing calendars, and posters of all kinds. He describes his boyish amazement in the late 1940s at the new phenomenon of a small grainy black & white TV program. Vacation trips with his parents introduced him to Western landscapes when he made amateur photographs with a consumer camera. Those trips generated a latent interest in landscape photography. Ray started college at USC but soon transferred to UCLA, from where he graduated in 1963, majoring in art with an emphasis in Design. Subject to the draft he enlisted in the US Army. Trained by the Army in photogrammetry and drafting, he worked on various military engineering projects. Leaving the Army after two years he returned to civilian life in Los Angeles. Putting his college studies and Army experience to use, he worked for Summa Corporation, a Howard Hughes Company, on various building and land development projects. In an art class with Robert Heinecken at UCLA, McSavaney got a brief introduction to photography but had only slight interest in his teacher's subjects from ‘found objects’, but he kept some of Heinecken's teachings in mind, and later was able to apply it in his own work. Enjoying the outdoors, Ray was much more attracted to natural landscapes. Sometime in the mid-60s those became his first serious art photography interest.

=== Evolving photographic career ===
Seeking temporary escapes from what had become a stultifying office career, McSavaney took Sierra Club wilderness hikes on which he usually carried his small camera. At times he shared his pictures in various amateur photography shows, learning from feedback comments and critiques. He continually expanded his basic skills through college classes, photography workshops with the experts, assiduous reading, and intensive self-study. Sometime in the early 70s, still employed by Hughes but increasingly interested in photography, McSavaney enrolled in an Ansel Adams photography workshop, soon delving into the art and practice of classical black and white Western landscape photography. By this time Adams, a long-established master, was the 'go to' guru for photographic truths and McSavaney was ready for them. Adams encouraged his workshop students to put up their best photographs for review and critique. Thinking he had only masterpieces, Ray was soon brought to reality by the quality of Adams’ images and those of the other workshop instructors — Roger Minick, Wynn Bullock, Paul Caponigro, and comparable masters. Determined to achieve that same proficiency level, he began working on improving his craft and his artistic ‘seeing’.

In addition to the subject itself, McSavaney cultivated a sensitivity to its immediate surroundings and overall quality of light. He worked at getting a feel for its immediate environment and interrelationships among its elements. Always aware that there were at least two people involved in a photograph — the photographer and the viewer — he aimed to have the maximum emotional impact on the viewer. He planned and visualized his final print accordingly. Averring that he found the world difficult to understand “through isolated bits of information”, that is, a single photograph, he knew that he wanted to work with related subjects, ideally in a series. He discovered that subtle relationships become clear when presented in a ‘context’ of several complementary photographs of the same or equivalent subjects. By a subject's 'relationships', he meant shapes, forms, tonal values, quality of light in its surroundings, and even color. Well aware of the work of Minor White, in addition to that of Adams, McSavaney no doubt knew of the effectiveness of presenting interrelated photographs - which White referred to as equivalents or as sequences.

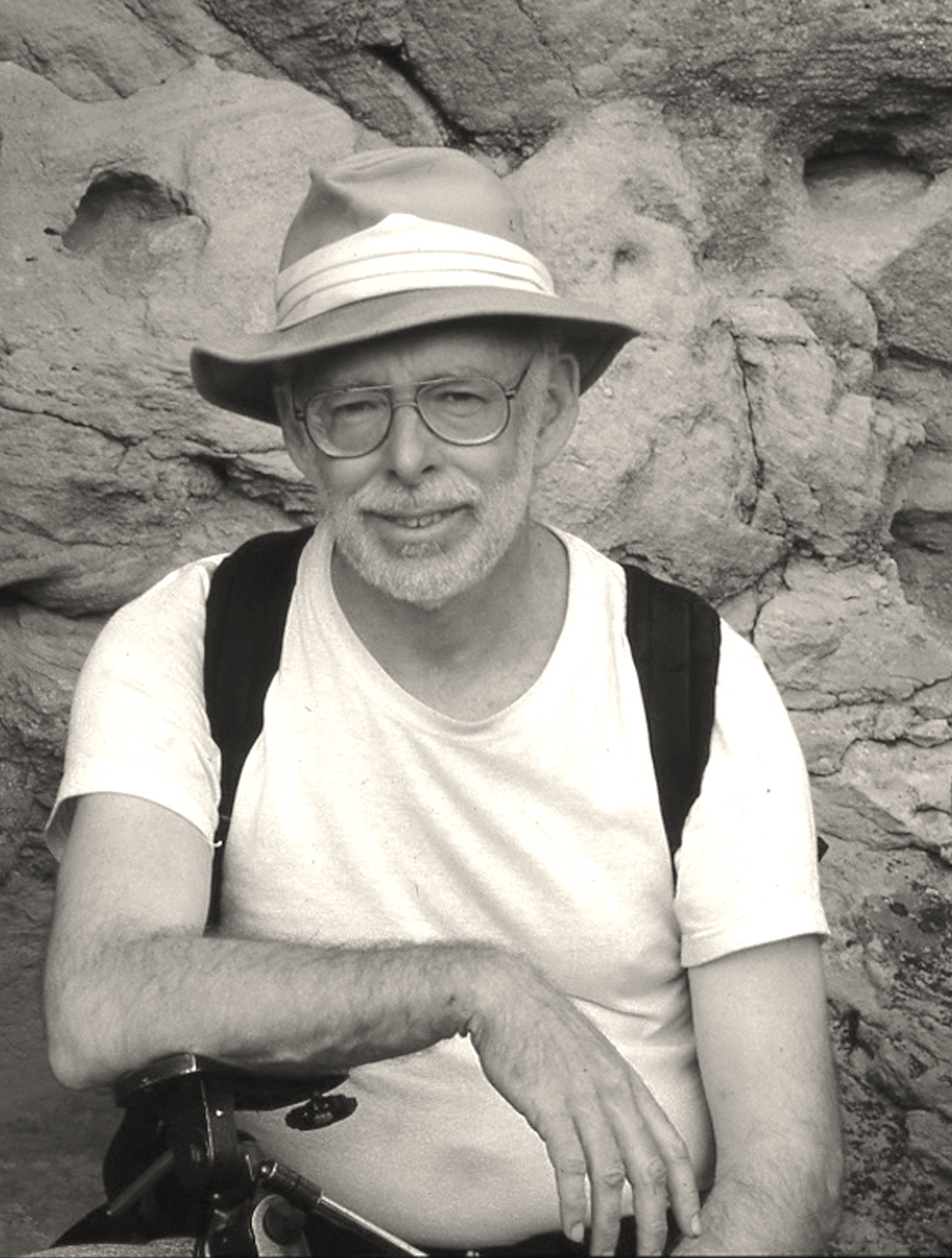
Ray, Hovenweep NP, May '93 by Christopher Purcell

While on a 1972 Sierra Club photography workshop he showed prints to the instructor, Bruce Barnbaum, who was very much impressed by their quality and originality. As ardent outdoorsmen, both soon bonded on subsequent Sierra Club trips. In the late 70s, becoming increasingly disgruntled with working for an impersonal corporation, McSavaney embarked on his own career in fine-art photography. The friendship and collaboration with Barnbaum soon led to formation of the noted fine-art photography program, the Owens Valley Photography Workshops (OVPW). The pair, later joined by John Sexton, previously one of Ansel Adams’ photography assistants, formed the OVPW staff. As program co-directors, the three organized and managed it until 1990 when they dissolved their partnership by mutual agreement. McSavaney soon established his own photography workshop program; Barnbaum and Sexton still have active fine-art workshop programs.

==== Selection of subject ====
At the beginning of his photography career, McSavaney worked only on subjects that strongly attracted him — not atypical of many photographers until they find their own unique ‘vision’. Conditioned by his years in urban planning, he continued his quest for ‘context’ and relationships for his photographic subjects. As noted, instead of isolated subjects he saw that their interrelationships produced stronger compositions. His eight-year series on the “Walking Trees” at Yosemite National Park and the ever-changing graffiti of the Santa Ana Freeway Bridge, continued with some of White's themes.

One theme permeating McSavaney's photography is lifelong concern for the environment, an attitude that he described as “… a journey through the natural and urban landscapes of the uncertain present". So, recurring themes of how man shaped the environment, and conversely how the environment shaped man, are found in his photography, his writings, and workshop discussions. Readily apparent in his writings is the ongoing fascination with natural landscapes that he wanted to express through nuances of fine art landscape photography. By his own admission, his favorite destination was Yosemite National Park. However, several years were to pass before he could photograph there to his satisfaction.

In formulating a photograph in his mind's eye, a process Ansel Adams termed ‘visualization’, McSavaney always looked to making a photograph with the strongest emotional appeal. In his view, that meant harmonizing in the final work the subject's normally awkward brightness range and tonal values. And for that, he had to perfect his increasing mastery of photographic composition - defined by Edward Weston as 'the strongest form of seeing'. That took much practice and intensive experimentation, especially since he was attracted to scenes of tonal extremes. In an apparent contradiction, he also was attracted to scenes that he could portray in a limited tonal range. He termed that ‘high key’ in which the print tonal values fall on Zones VI – VIII in Adams’ terminology. Parenthetically, Adams' had words of caution, a caveat emptor, in use of the Zone system as the key to making a good photograph. Wisely stating that it was only a means to an end, a viewpoint that McSavaney quickly adopted, he advocated using it with awareness of its limitations and with its utility. Adams illustrates this in an encounter with a quotidian photographer at Point Lobos stating that, after the Zone System is learned in detail, it becomes a way of thinking and of applying technical principles while visualizing a potential photograph. It has a basic simple mantra, however: Expose for the shadows, develop for the highlights.

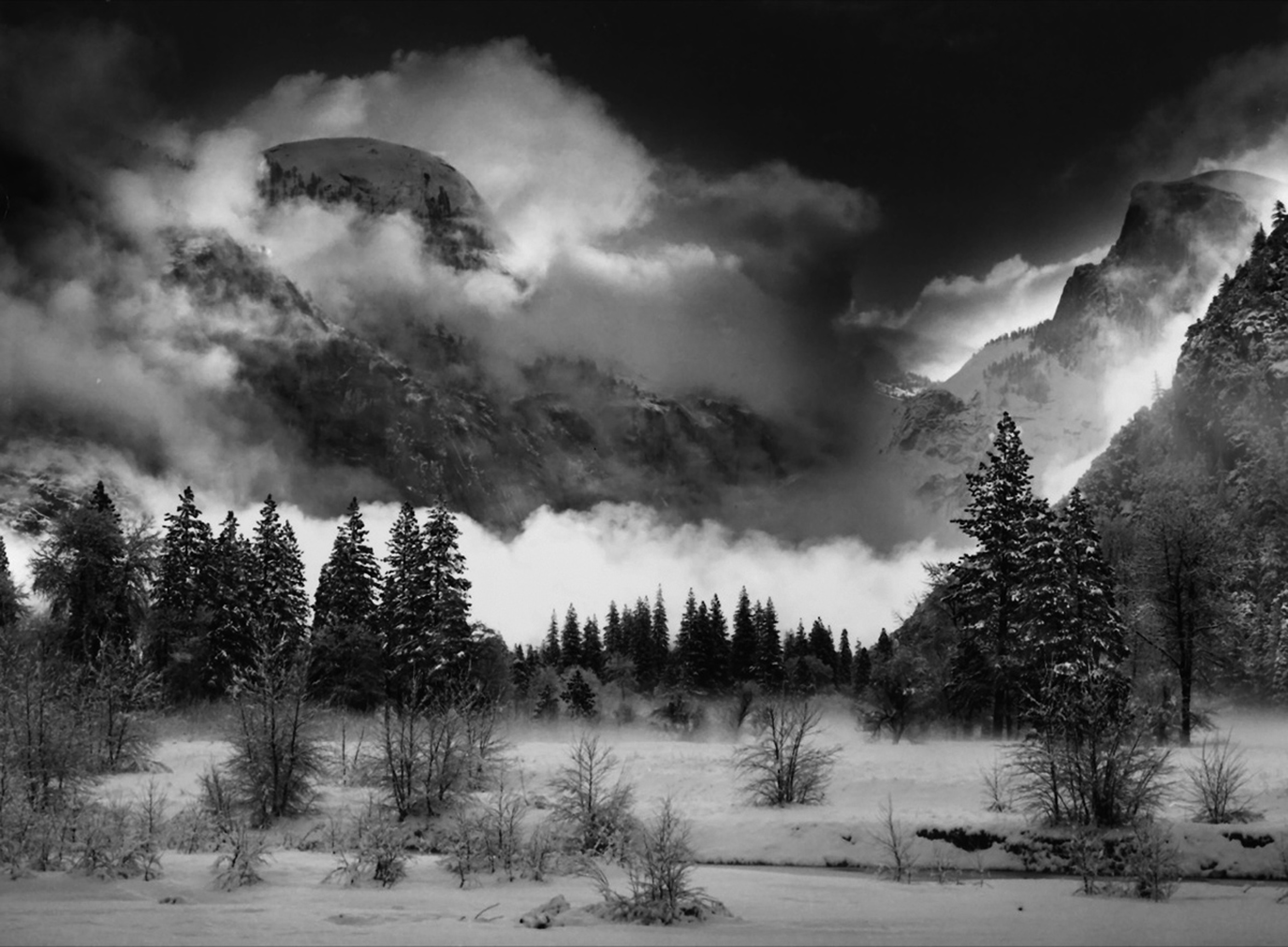
Yosemite Valley winter landscape, '73 by Ray McSavaney

While many take the view that a ‘good’ photograph (technically) has deep blacks and bright whites, ‘it ain’t necessarily so’. Adams quotes an observation from his photographic assistant, John Sexton, slightly paraphrased as, 'many students believe that when they have a good black and a good white, then they have a good print. Actually, at that point, they are only ready to begin to print the negative'. The point, of course, is that such a technically good photograph may not convey the mood or spirit of a scene that fine art photographers seek in their work.

== Main photographic projects ==
Very early in his career, McSavaney determined to master the 'craft of photography' in order to adequately express his vision of what his mental photograph should represent. Applying and sometimes extending Ansel's teachings in making an "expressive print", Ray honed and matured his artistic seeing and technical skills in two especially striking Los Angeles locations. One was the abandoned Uniroyal Tire Factory alongside a then busy highway, now a much busier Los Angeles freeway; the other a major construction project in the city center, known as Bunker Hill, Los Angeles Redevelopment. In working on those unusually contrasty scenes, McSavaney soon discovered that his photographic skills were grossly inadequate. He was challenged by the technical pitfalls presented by scenes with extreme luminance ranges. Adams had discussed in detail just such pitfalls in his book on the Camera. With all that in mind in preparation for those difficult projects, McSavaney thoroughly experimented with several of Adams’ techniques for developing film exposed under extreme tonal ranges and lighting conditions.

=== Urban subjects ===
Two of McSavaney's early photography series were what he termed "The Tire Factory" and "The Bunker Hill Project". In each of these subjects he was faced with ranges of brightness, tonalities, and contrasts that he had not previously encountered.

The design motif of the Uniroyal Tire Factory would have done credit to a Cecil B. DeMille Hollywood epic. With almost a third of a mile façade alongside a busy highway, crenellated and turreted like King Sargon's palace, it mirrored the flapper era national infatuation with exotic foreign and architectural motifs. Serving only as a decorative but secure wall shielding the huge tire factory, it projected the strength and endurance that its owners hoped existed in their products. Surviving until 1978, when its nearly half century of tire production ended, it stood abandoned until redevelopment began on the site in 1989. Living in a nearby city at the time, no doubt regularly going by the factory, McSavaney became intrigued and decided to ‘check it out’. He was among the many fine art photographers of the time who viewed remnants from earlier ages, such as the Tire Factory, the Ancient Puebloan ruins, and Los Angeles bridges, as ‘Forgotten Places’. They had an ongoing quest to photograph them before they disappeared forever.

Inspecting the vast Bunker Hill construction site, McSavaney was struck by what he knew was its inevitable impending sterility. He had remembered its small Mom & Pop stores from his Los Angeles youth, its busy street scenes, the many varied activities of the old neighborhoods then being demolished. When Bunker Hill construction was completed in the early 1990s, the result was as he had foreseen — an area dominated by institutionalized cookie-cutter high-rise office buildings. However, while it was being built, Ray was attracted to the ongoing construction, the emerging new buildings, and the continual changes as the vast job progressed. He soon realized that accidental arrangements and juxtapositions among the construction tools and materials created unplanned but sometimes visually pleasing compositions. Multiple reflections, erratic lighting patterns, and unusual associations between near and far elements related in striking combinations, especially so at night when areas of light and shadow appeared in unexpected contexts. At such times the construction site, empty of workers and people, showed its stark reality.

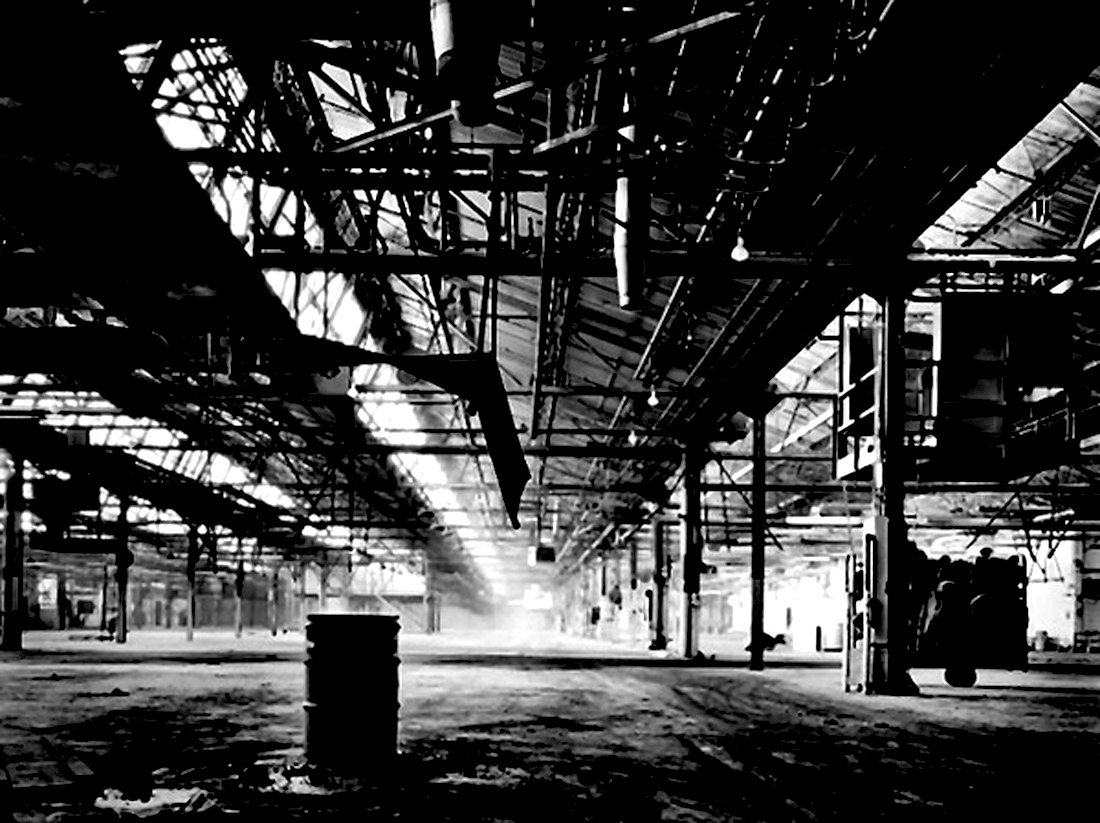
Abandoned tire factory by Ray McSavaney, 1980

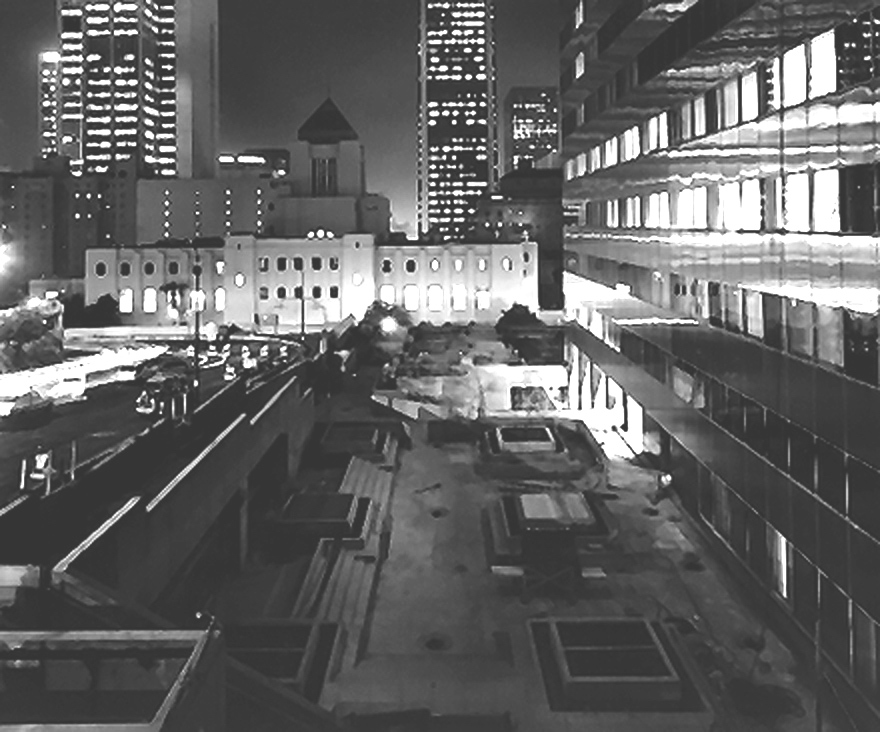
Construction at Bunker Hill, LA by Ray McSavaney, 1981

==== Photographic difficulties - encountered and solved ====
Replete with dark corners, vast inaccessible coal-black interior spaces with barely visible detail, shafts of hazy light beaming through roof and wall breaks, the tire factory presented extremely difficult technical obstacles to making a satisfactory photograph. In terms of Adams’ Zone system, its luminance levels ranged ‘from DC to light’, that is, from Adams Zone I to Zone XVI or higher. Such a wide luminance range generally exceeded the film's recording abilities and extended far beyond that of extant print paper. Consequently, in order to make an expressive print, McSavaney faced the need to ‘open’ shadows and ‘compress’ highs into ranges that the film could handle, and enable him to make an expressive print. After extensive experimentation, by further diluting the most dilute of Adams’ compensating developers, he found that he could produce a satisfactory negative. Applying the photographer's rule of thumb, ‘expose for the shadows, develop for the highlights’, he successfully handled those very difficult subjects. As shown by the accompanying photograph, his techniques worked effectively. Over a two-year period, he exposed more than 800 negatives in the factory. Parenthetically, an estimate of his lifetime production exceeds 50,000 negatives. Of those, about 30,000 remain in his archives. Clearly he didn't believe that all his exposures were masterpieces. In that respect, he agreed with an assertion by his colleague John Sexton, that the single most important darkroom tool was his trash can.

In order to make effective photographs of the Bunker Hill constructions, McSavaney faced a new set of technical problems from working at night and in harsh lighting. Once again, as with the Tire Factory, he was faced with a range of luminance extremes that exceeded recording capabilities of available film. However, in Bunker Hill those conditions were compounded by the exposure challenges of the site's bright electrical lights and surrounding streetlights. Eschewing use of floodlights or other artificial lighting, he forged ahead knowing he could take care of exposure problems by control of his materials — negatives and print paper. Turning again to experimentation, he suitably modified his film compensating development formulae to handle those new conditions. His techniques are well summarized in photography magazine interviews. The accompanying photograph of a Bunker Hill scene speaks for itself. In a subsequent interview, he discussed the emotional and visual conflicts presented by these urban projects. He found that to his sensitivities, the Tire Factory created " a conflict between the grandeur and ugliness of the space"; whereas, the new Bunker Hill environment "is a sea of well-organized architecture and planning that ... becomes repetitious". Knowing the region well, he mentally compared that to the city's old established neighborhoods where "there does seem to be an order to the chaos".

=== Landscapes ===
Although fast becoming an interpreter of the urban scene, his native environment, McSavaney maintained his interest in landscape photography. As previously mentioned, one notable landscape stands out among his favorites, Yosemite National Park. Returning there as often as possible, he discovered new viewpoints and relationships requiring insightful and creative artistic interpretations. Eschewing the adage, attributed to Louis Pasteur, that “Chance favors the prepared mind”, McSavaney left little to chance but much to inspiration from familiarity with a scene or location. He recounts walking through Yosemite meadows in misty early mornings looking for the right combination of light, subject, and surroundings for an expressive photograph. Unlike his mentor Adams who, forty years earlier, reportedly made similar explorations of Yosemite Valley accompanied only by his burro, McSavaney walked through it accompanied only by his camera. Without being especially conscious of it, Ray had the habits of the old time photographers (not to mention painters such as Van Gogh, Monet, Georgia O’Keeffe) who returned time and again to a favorite location: Ansel Adams to Yosemite, Edward Weston to Point Lobos, Wynn Bullock and Morley Baer to the Big Sur coastline, Paul Caponigro to the Reading Woods, Oliver Gagliani to Bodie and other western ghost towns. No doubt McSavaney learned from an episode recounted by Adams. In driving around Yosemite, Adams kept a weather eye open for photographic opportunities. He recounts driving past an eye-catching river scene "hundreds of times" but not at a time that he could photograph it to his satisfaction. Except one early morning when everything clicked and he made his photograph. Titled 'Early Morning, Merced River, Autumn' it clearly shows the advantages of familiarity with a subject; repetitive visits can pay off in unexpectedly different ways.

John Sexton, his fellow OVPW co-director, also states the value of revisiting a potential subject with the resulting insights it produces. As he notes in his elegant book ‘Quiet Light’, “Trying to make photographs that can speak takes time. Seldom do I visit a place for the first time and immediately make photographs I find meaningful”. Both McSavaney and Sexton, as with the other masters, far from being in a rut-like repetitive visits to a scene, found it effective if not essential in making memorable photographs. More than any other rubric, McSavaney wanted to make "meaningful" photographs. McSavaney portrays Sexton's dedication to making a fine art photograph while the two of them searched for worthwhile images during their innumerable trips to the America Southwest in his 'Afterword' to Sexton's luminous book of photographs, 'Recollections'. They both shared the same dedication to making a memorable fine art photograph. No doubt, both McSavaney and Sexton had an Adams' pithy observation in mind, "It is easy to take a photograph, but it is harder to make a masterpiece in photography than in any other art medium.

In his book, “West of Eden”, David Robertson assessed that McSavaney's work in Yosemite “falls into two periods". In the mid-70s, he reacted to the Valley's “more quiet and somber moods”. Less than a decade later, after honing his skills on the urban Uniroyal Tire Factory and Bunker Hills Redevelopment series, McSavaney began to show Yosemite in its more dramatic moods, one of which appears in the accompanying example.

Well into his professional career, McSavaney increasingly realized that he had to convey his own meaning in a photograph before it could evoke a kindred emotional response in the viewer. Adams describes the challenge from the viewer's standpoint, "For the viewer, the meaning of the print is his meaning". Drawing on inspiration derived from the woods and forests that he considered among his “favorite photographic subjects”, Ray set about creating such responses. One writer, assessing his growing artistic confidence, noted that McSavaney had "a natural eye for finding uncommon beauty in unexpected places". Putting that 'natural eye' to use in critically surveying a scene, he looked for combinations of elements that would best show the subtle relationships he sought and would be emotionally evocative for his viewers. Echoing John Muir's observation that all things in Nature are "hitched to everything else in the Universe”, McSavaney wanted his landscape photographs to show just how “everything is so interconnected”. Examples from some of his best Yosemite photographs are shown in his Web site. A prolific reader, with a library of well over 1000 books in his small and crowded artist's loft when he died, he was well versed in Muir's writings — doubly so as a lifelong Sierra Club member.

=== Pueblo southwest ===
From boyhood tours with his parents, McSavaney knew of the spectacular scenery and native people of the American Southwest. At the outset of his career, he felt attracted to a region roughly centered on the Four Corners, roughly the hub of a vast upland known as the Colorado Plateau. In addition to its unrivaled landscapes, included in his many subjects were the 3000-year old Great Gallery pictographs, — appropriately shown in the opening and closing scenes of the cult movie Koyaanisqatsi — the monumental Mesa Verde National Park and Cedar Mesa Anasazi ruins, now included in Bears Ears National Monument; the formation of which became an unfolding saga over many years and one that Ray followed with intense interest. McSavaney also was attracted to the rich Hispanic colonial heritage of churches and shrines, especially the iconic Mission Church of Ranchos de Taos and the contemporary Southwest Hopi, Pueblo, and Navajo people. He was especially enamored by Taos Pueblo. In collaboration with the late Taos writer John Nichols (see his obituary in the Taos News) he held several photography workshops in Taos and surrounding villages.

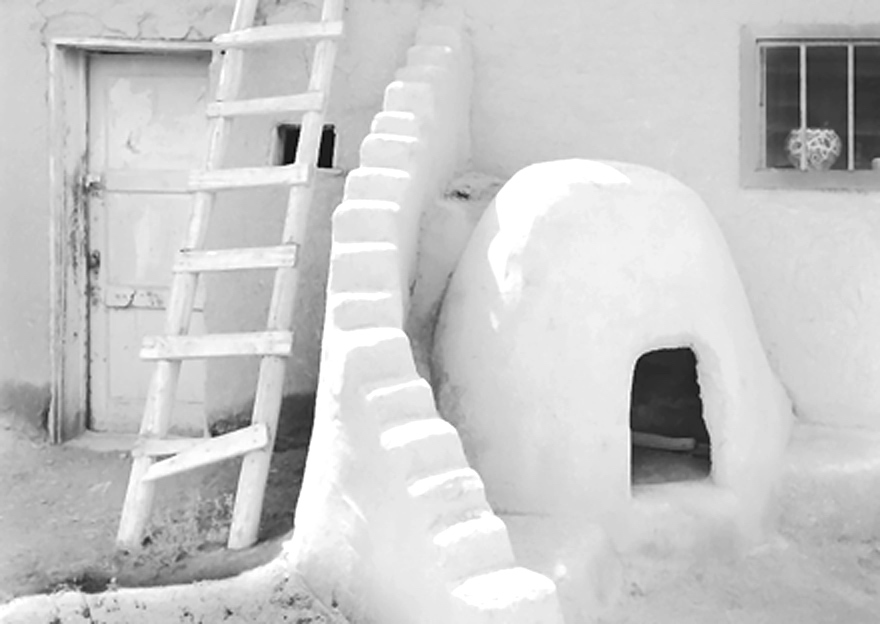
Horno, ladder at Taos Pueblo by Ray McSavaney, 1980

During multiple visits to the American Southwest, both independently and with collaborators, McSavaney photographed landscapes including Monument Valley and areas of northern New Mexico such as Enchanted Mesa near Acoma. Beginning in the early 1980s, he led annual photography workshops in the region, initially with the OVPW and later through his own program. He also made independent trips to remote locations, including the canyons of Cedar Mesa.

Over several years, he developed a body of black-and-white photographs documenting the landscapes and cultural history of the Southwest. Much of this work remained unpublished at the time of his death, and he left an unfinished book project. He had expressed interest in collaborating with a writer on a publication related to his work in the region, but the project was not completed.

In his Southwest work, McSavaney envisioned displaying it “from man’s beginning … to the present”, as he states in one of his brochures. He produced work of a quality that far superseded that of most Southwest photographers working in the black and white medium. His treatment of the Southwest subject matter, mainly those of Cedar Mesa and Bears Ears National Monument, of which Cedar mesa is the heart and soul, through luminous dramatic black and white photographs, capture the heritage of the Ancestral Puebloans.

In his many ventures to the area, he was always intrigued with the landscape, especially the dramatic rock formations of Monument Valley, and the mesas of Northern New Mexico, like the Enchanted Mesa near Acoma. Beginning in the early 1980's, McSavaney held a yearly Southwest photography workshop, at first with the OVPW, and later through his own program. He made numerous private trips to the Southwest to photograph remote sites — the rugged Cedar Mesa canyons held a special fascination for him. Considering it a long-term project, he made luminous black and white photographs over several years that portray the unique native history of the region. Most of them, along with an unfinished book, were left unpublished after his death. Being conscious that his photographs of the Southwest could spur efforts in saving its natural and historical treasures, he had long hoped to join with one its most sensitive and insightful writers in a collaborative effort. It was not to be. In his ambitious Southwest work, McSavaney envisioned displaying it “from man’s beginning … to the present”, as he states in one of his brochures. His treatment of the Southwest subject matter, mainly those of Cedar Mesa and Bears Ears National Monument, of which Cedar mesa is the heart and soul, capture the heritage of the Ancestral Puebloans.

==== Effective interpretation ====
McSavaney photographed the challenging Southwest pueblo ruins with as much of an eye to dramatizing as to portraying them. By now, he was a photographer, confident that he could capture any scene, regardless of whatever technical difficulties it may present. His knowledge of materials, gained through rigorous testing and experimentation, allowed him to confidently subjects that would "defeat a lesser craftsman". In addition to their luminance extremes, the ruins held dark regions of very flat contrast. For most of his Southwest photographs, besides having to compress wide luminance ranges, he simultaneously had to drastically expand parts of many images — a very difficult technical exposure situation.

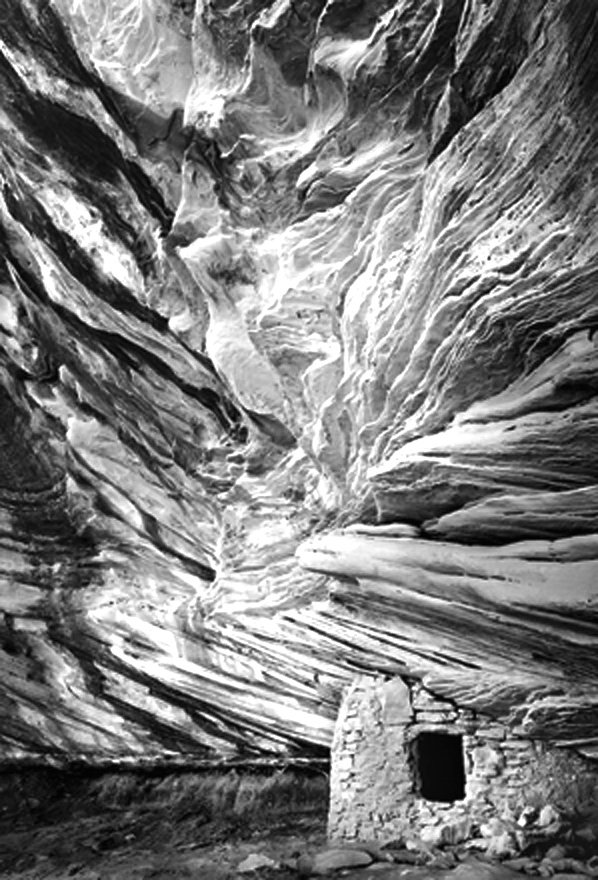
Anasazi ruin, Cedar Mesa by Ray McSavaney, 1989

Showing versatility with materials, McSavaney printed many of his Southwest Anasazi ruins in high key which enabled him to achieve effective representation of the ancient, ruined dwellings, that had reposed for centuries in searing Southwest desert sunlight amid dramatic natural surroundings. Consistent through his work on the Southwest, he rendered the ancient ruins with their dark-stained, contorted rock surroundings. Many of his resulting photographs express drama and surprising effects as he recorded the enduring heritage of the Ancestral Puebloans. This drama is present in the accompanying photograph of the Barrier Canyon Style anthropomorph rock art.

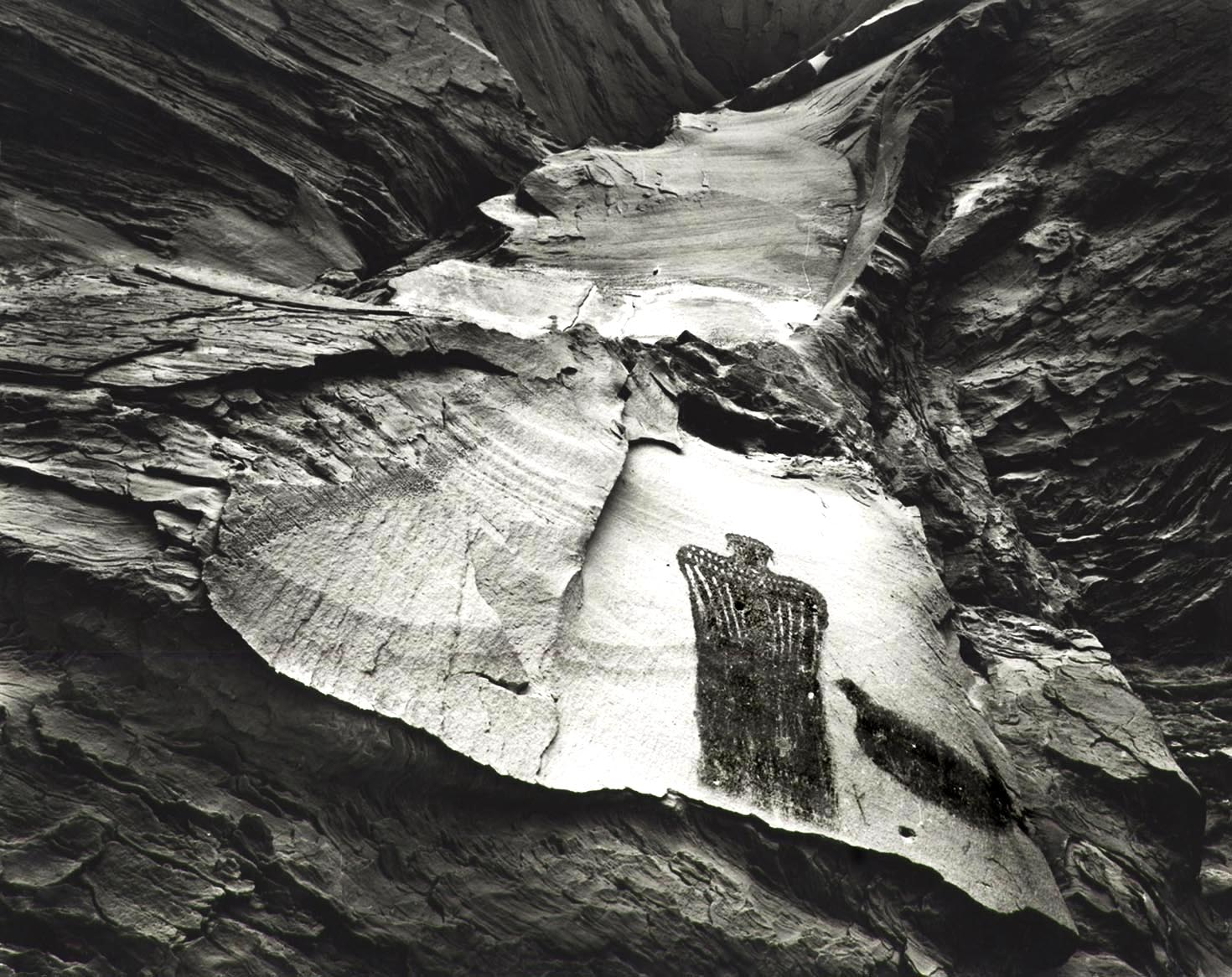
Anthropomorph, SE Utah by Ray McSavaney, ~1990

Knowing Adam's admonition that what the artist creates is his message, McSavaney wanted the Anasazi to speak through his photographs as much as he did himself; that is, speak to the viewer. He had a unique ability to see the unified whole - the rock structures and colors, their multitude of forms and textures, the matrix as it were, into which the ancient builders had incorporated their own vision of the world. Having mastered the nuances of negative exposure and resultant printing, McSavaney departed from convention in the Southwest work to convey the eye for dramatic settings — some would say ‘chaotic’ — that their ancient dwellers undoubtedly possessed. In many cases, their sites were almost always located amid surroundings of cliff overhangs with ominous descending streaks of black algal growth fused to the stone, unusual rock patterns, many affording unlimited vistas. Applying his ongoing quest for appropriate ‘context’, McSavaney photographed the contorted geology of their surroundings as much as the ruins themselves, uniting them into organic compositions. Recognizing McSavaney's penchant for seeking order in chaos, a situation exemplified by many Southwest ruins and crowded Los Angeles street scenes, writer David Robertson again quotes him as stating “Relationships between the objects, or people for that matter, in a photograph are maybe more important than the objects themselves”. A statement with which the ancient Anasazi, and the Barrier Canyon era artist, with their keen eyes for expressive locations, most likely would agree. As would modern day viewers of McSavaney's Broadway and Melrose Avenue series. (See the 'Ancient Ruin Sites' and 'People' in his web site.)

=== Still Life with Florals ===
Although maintaining his ongoing interests in Southwest ruins and landscape photography, Ray became increasingly attracted to photographing plucked flowers in contrived setups in his studio at The Brewery Art Colony for what he called his “Botanical Studies”. Suitably arranging them with backdrops of photographic print paper patterned from randomly drizzled developer, he portrayed them undergoing graceful aging decay. He followed two main themes in these studies. One was direct portraits of the studio arrangements, bathed in luminous natural northern light with receding backgrounds that created the impression of magically floating in air. The second, much more complex, was achieved by juxtaposing a polaroid print of the subject plant with the real one arranged in a creative combination. The polaroid surfaces, some with amorphous shapes and blotches, formed distinctive framings for the flowers. Samples of these botanical studies are shown below; others are in his web site 'Botanical studies'. At times McSavaney combined his search for suitable floral materials in the downtown Los Angeles flower market with a photography workshop at his studio. On such occasions he explained to his students the subject attributes he was looking for that would lead to an expressive print, samples of which are shown below.

Although privately he may have considered them metaphors for the human condition, from youthful energetic beauty and vitality through old age wrinkling, deterioration, and inevitable death, he was somewhat philosophical about it. He merely observed that he found “flowers can die in interesting ways” — a typical McSavaney understatement. He observed that accidental defects in their parts sometimes produce “an exciting and luminous image”. However, merely photographing florals — fading, fresh or otherwise — would have had minimal interest for McSavaney. Well versed as he was in art photography precedences, it's not unlikely that he would have been influenced by the symbolism expressed through the equivalents of Alfred Stieglitz and Minor White. Over several years, it's a very strong possibility that he may have found in his florals, subjects as profound as the equivalents that Stieglitz found in clouds and White in his "Song without Words".

Selected McSavaney Botanicals
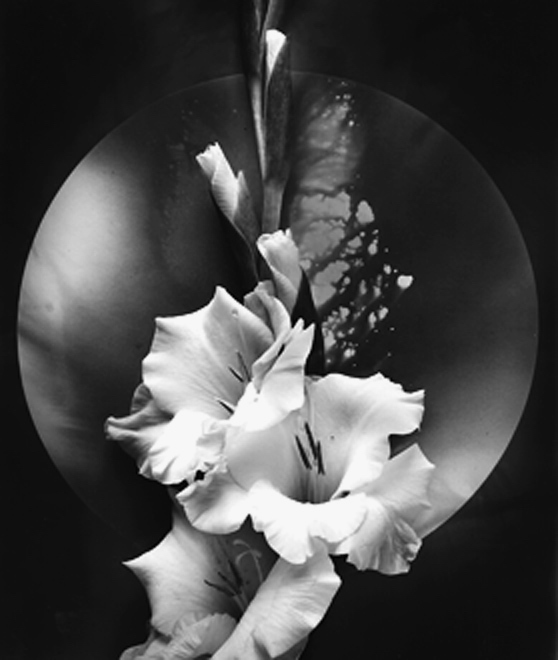
White Gladiolus, 1999

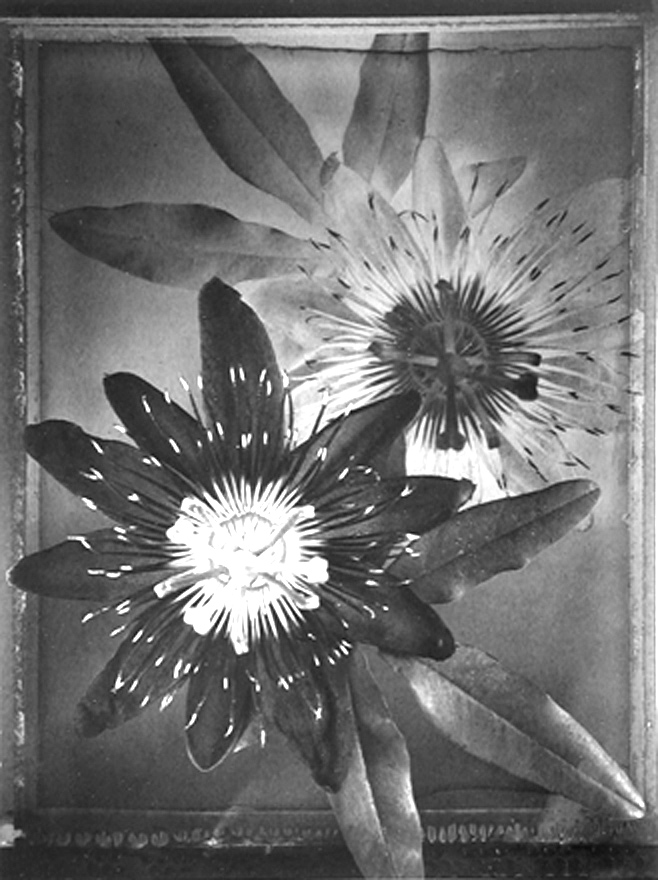
Passion Flower, 2010

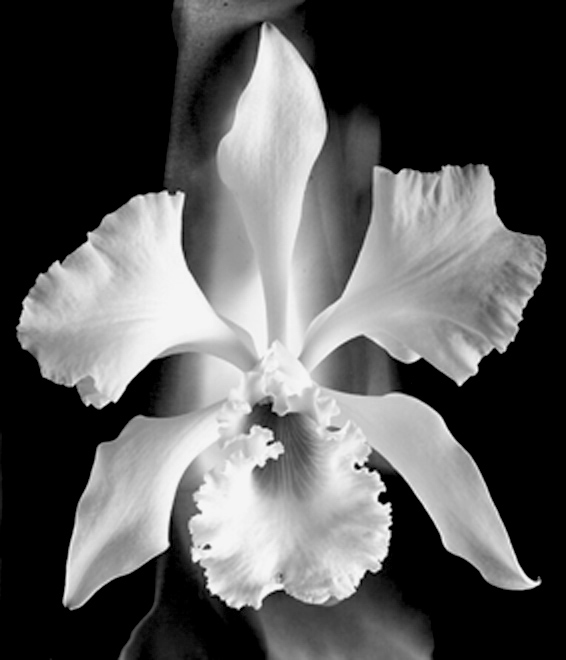
White Orchid, 1999

== Photography teacher ==
=== Interpretation of subject ===
For some Southwest subjects, McSavaney frequently resorted to high key printing. In that rendition, he faced a somewhat different technical problem by the need to further compress the subject tonal range into the three highest tonal values the paper could take. In order for it to work, he had to visualize the final print, then properly expose his negative to enable him to print it in the limited high-key tonal range; that is, he had to plan the complete end-to-end process in some detail. In those situations Adams' Zone System is most effective. Having learned at the feet of the master, McSavaney utilized Adams' principles of image management and value management to control the complete process. In Adams' explanation, such control allows a photographer to "visualize the different possible renderings of a subject at the film plane, and manage the image in such a way as to achieve the desired photographic interpretation. Easy as pie!. Applying Adams’ instructional approach in critiquing students’ work, McSavaney's workshops attracted generations of large-format photographers. His non-judgmental evaluations of their photographs were authentic learning experiences. At times, he invited other well-known photographers as workshop instructors – for examples Paul Caponigro, Michael Kenna and his former OVPW colleague John Sexton. Occasionally he invited talented writers and artists as joint instructors in his workshop program. A frequent participant was writer John Nichols, another the Santa Fe artist Carol Rose Brown, each a highly acclaimed practitioner of Southwestern themes. He well knew that their differing insights and viewpoints would enrich his students’ experiences. Some of his students had successful photography careers; among them the Los Angeles medical doctor Bernard Lewinsky and a sometime companion in the Southwest, Ken Karagozian (see below).

Invariably, McSavaney encouraged his students to seek out other sources of instruction. Advising them to consider other large-format photographic workshops, even those of competitors, he was very generous in encouraging students' attempts to master the art of photography. He especially recommended the many programs offered by the Friends of Photography. Unfortunately now defunct, it was a treasured hub of fine art photography and exhibitions during the final three decades of the 20th century.

Further exemplified by Adams, who distilled his encyclopedic knowledge of photography into the making of just 40 photographs, McSavaney was ever eager to share his professional techniques with fellow photographers and students. Bruce Barnbaum recounts how he learned his compensating development procedure from Ray. Parenthetically, Barnbaum also has a good discussion of the procedure in his own technical book and in his radiant "Visual Symphony". Similarly, following in the photographic footsteps of Adams, his early assistant, John Sexton, holds back no secrets in describing how he makes his masterful photographs. In his poetically beautiful book, "Listen to the Trees", he provides a virtual playback of his printmaking procedure in making a print from a slightly uncooperative negative. He provides a graphic example of Adams representing the performance of the musical concert (making the print) from the score (the negative). Sexton makes it look easy. In addition to that singular example, he provides detailed technical information on producing each of the negatives from which the almost forty plates in his book are made.

=== Workshop materials ===
Ray McSavaney distributed handouts to students in his workshops that documented his darkroom techniques and technical innovations. Examples included "Highly Diluted HC-110 as a Film Developer" and guides on methods for controlling print contrast. He developed several photographic developer formulas for projects such as Tire Factory and Bunker Hills, later adapting some of these techniques to his landscape and Southwestern photography.

Like photographer Ansel Adams, McSavaney openly shared his technical methods through workshops, publications, and articles. His printing notes, handwritten on 4×5-inch cards, were archived alongside his negatives. These records document his field and darkroom practices and provide insight into his photographic workflow and techniques.

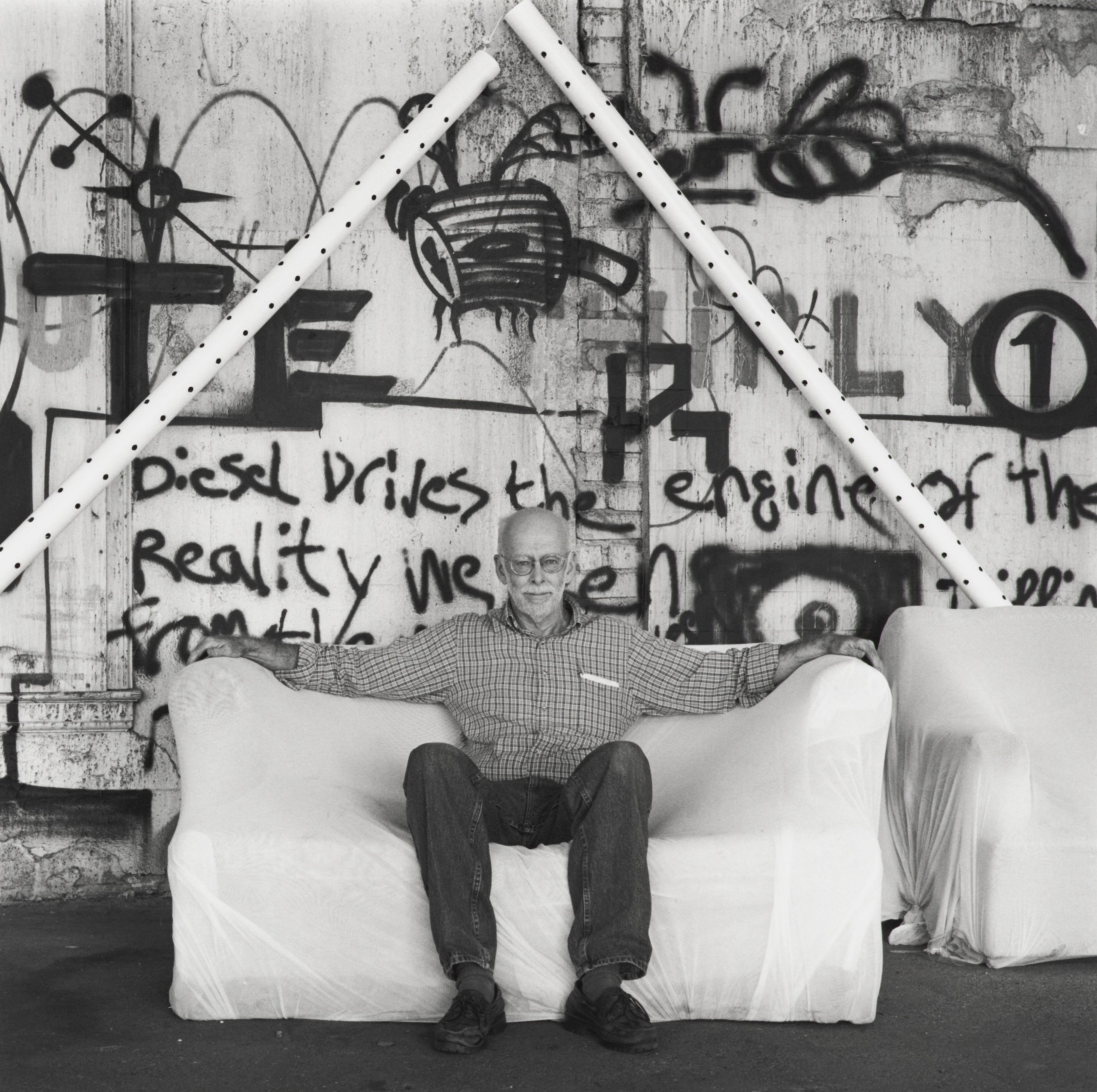
Ray McSavaney, Los Angeles graffiti site, late 90s, by Ken Karagozian

Although thoroughly steeped in Adam's photographic techniques, and no doubt enamored by his mastery of classical Western landscape photography, McSavaney in some ways resembled the late Rondal Partridge, teenage apprentice to Ansel Adams, — and who, incidentally, flits in and out of his autobiography — photographic assistant to Dorothea Lange, and son of Imogen Cunningham. Among some comparisons with McSavaney, Partridge made still lifes of decaying plants, and particularly specialized in showing 'humanity's encroachments", as the Times put it. Similarly, Ray's attraction to unsavory locales under the LA freeways and bridges allowed him to explore with artistic effect, a seamy side of the city. To paraphrase the words of the Times, neither one grew rich off his photographs. Instead, each had a lifetime's dedication to his craft; each put little-known parts of Los Angeles on the photographic map.

=== Making a photograph ===
When planning a photograph in the field, as if stalking his subject enacting Philip Hyde's motivation that "somewhere in this picture there's a photograph", McSavaney preferred to first inspect it from different locations and angles. It took him a while to make his photographs. At such times, no doubt an Adams' admonition was not far from his mind: "a very small change in camera position can make a great difference in the visual relationships within the photograph". Peering at his subject through a cardboard cutout, rotating and extending it to frame the scene, his ‘viewing frame’, with dimensions proportional to the classic 4x5 film, enabled McSavaney to select the best vantage point. By holding it at different viewing distances, it further allowed him to select the appropriate lens. Parenthetically, he somewhat emulated Adams in use of the viewing frame as an aid to composition. Having decided on the most advantageous location, he dropped the frame and retrieved his equipment. Mounting the selected view camera lens, and submerging under his darkcloth, he adjusted the camera. Then, anticipating the decisive moment, if one existed in that context, he exposed his negatives. Concerned about altering the natural tonalities of a subject, he rarely used lens filters, with their concomitant irreversible effects on a negative. He would take care of any tonal dissonances later in the darkroom.

McSavaney's preferred equipment was a lightweight wood field camera with a variety of lenses. He preferred a wide-angle lens — his preference was a 90 mm — because, as he said, it enabled him to get close to his subject. As they progressively became available, he used wide-angle lens up to the then latest 47mm, enabling him to get even closer.

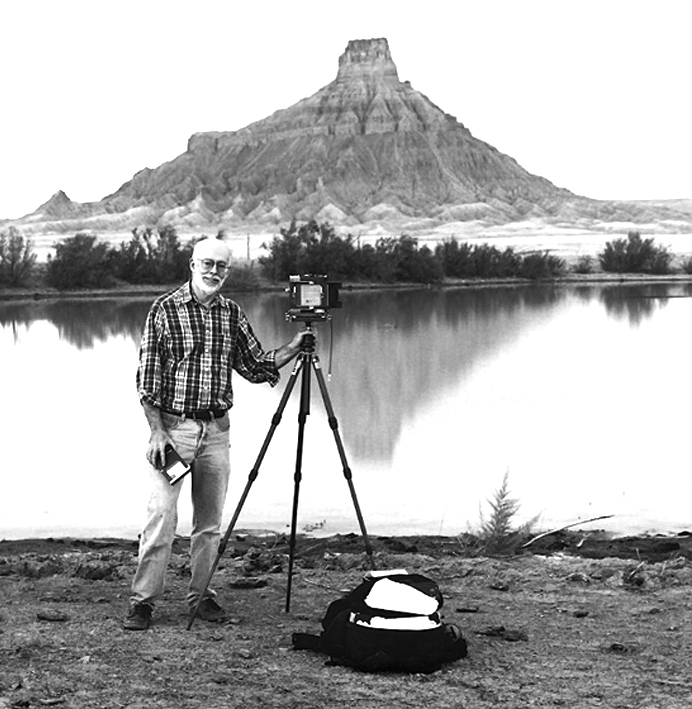
Ray McSavaney, Factory Butte, Utah, mid 90s, by Ken Karagozian

Even at the risk of running out of loaded film holders, he usually made at least two exposures. Parenthetically, the necessity of carrying bulky film holders (anachronisms in the digital age) was considerably eased when Kodak's Readyload packets became available. McSavaney's spare negative was insurance against defects and allowed him to experiment with altering its tonalities in the darkroom as necessary for printing. Occasionally he made a Polaroid print on the spot to decide on the best exposure for critical scenes. In the pre-digital age, it was a rare serious photographer who ventured into the wilds of the Southwest without a trusty Polaroid 4x5 film-pack adapter and several boxes of film. (Must read: Ansel's relationship with Edwin Land and Polaroid in). Many well-exposed polaroids are in McSavaney's archives. He was a very careful photographer, sparing no effort, always with the final print in mind. He practiced Adams’ dictum, that analogous to orchestral music, the negative is merely the score whereas the print is the concert performance. Somewhat in the same vein, Oliver Gagliani, a good friend of Ansel, had a slightly different take by analogizing music as the language of the soul, photography as the language of the spirit. Bruce Barnbaum passionately equates his landscape photographs to his music. Few serious photographers stray far from Adams' analogy, or far from the sound of music. McSavaney discusses some of those printing techniques in his book. He well knew Adams' wry observation on the occasional necessity for the fine art landscape photographer to use drastic exposure and processing techniques. Ansel is rumored to have observed about a scene, ‘God had a poor eye for tonal relationships’ — especially for esthetically pleasing tones of a fine-art photograph. Briefly, after making preliminary proofs to evaluate the possibilities of his negative, McSavaney decided the degree, if any, that he needed to alter it to achieve the final tonalities he wanted, and the print paper, developer, and toner to achieve them. After making proof prints, he progressively evaluated the negative for necessary adjustments for which he used selenium toner or Spotone dyes, judiciously applied in localized areas. During the enlarging process, he applied burning and dodging as necessary — again to satisfy his sensibilities of print tonalities and harmonies. He employed all ‘the tricks of the trade’ in producing his final prints — negative manipulation, selective exposure during printing, the combination of print paper, developer, and final toning that best expressed his vision for the print. The result invariably was a well-conceived photograph, sometimes even a masterpiece. A writer attending a McSavaney print exhibition summarized his techniques, his overall artistic seeing, and talented creativity with one insightful word: ‘craftsmanship’.

=== Photographic legacy ===
Ray McSavaney died in West Los Angeles Veteran's Hospital in July 2014. A prolific photographer, the many categories of subjects that attracted his lens are identified in his website above. His extensive archives are now distributed among several institutions. Briefly, some prints and his work on florals are housed at the Huntington Library, San Marino, California, also. His film archives, along with supporting materials, for his book 'Explorations' are at Center for Creative Photography. His B&W 4x5 negatives and a few prints of his Anasazi and Southwest subjects are at the J. Willard Marriott Library of the University of Utah; prints and some negatives of Los Angeles urban scenes are at the Richard J. Riordan Central Library in Los Angeles; his many color pencil sketches and B&W prints are at the Portland Art Museum.

== Exhibitions and collections ==
Notable Exhibitions:

- 1975: Lucas Gallery, San Francisco, CA
- 1982: Los Angeles Conservancy, Los Angeles, CA - Uniroyal Tire Factory Series
- 2008: TG Artworks Gallery, Santa Monica, CA - Thirty Five Years of Photography
- 2010: Gallery, The Los Angeles Center of Photography - Botanical Studies Series Collection.

Institutions that collected McSavaney's photographs include:

- Huntington Library, San Marino California – major acquisition 2015 from onwards
- Center for Creative Photography, Tucson, Arizona
- Portland Art Museum, Portland, Oregon
- Richard J. Riordan Central Library, Los Angeles, California

Institutions curating Ray McSavaney's archives:

- J. Willard Marriott Library of the University of Utah.
- Portland Art Museum, Portland, Oregon
