= The Milagro Beanfield War =

1988 film by Robert Redford

- Theatrical release poster
- Directed by: Robert Redford
- Written by: John Nichols; David S. Ward
- Based on: The Milagro Beanfield War by John Nichols
- Produced by: Moctesuma Esparza; Gary Hendler; Charles Mulvehill; Robert Redford
- Starring: Rubén Blades; Richard Bradford; Sônia Braga; Julie Carmen; James Gammon; Melanie Griffith; John Heard; Carlos Riquelme; Daniel Stern; Christopher Walken; Chick Vennera
- Cinematography: Robbie Greenberg
- Edited by: Dede Allen; Jim Miller
- Music by: Dave Grusin
- Distributed by: Universal Pictures
- Release date: March 18, 1988 (United States)
- Running time: 117 minutes
- Country: United States
- Language: English
- Budget: $22 million
- Box office: $13,825,794

The Milagro Beanfield War is a 1988 American comedy-drama film directed by Robert Redford, based on a novel by John Nichols. The movie features an ensemble cast including Ruben Blades, Richard Bradford, Sônia Braga, Julie Carmen, James Gammon, Melanie Griffith, John Heard, Carlos Riquelme, Daniel Stern, Chick Vennera, and Christopher Walken. The plot revolves around a man's fight to protect his small beanfield and community against larger business and political interests.

The film was released on Blu-ray by Kino Lorber on September 29, 2020.

== Plot ==
In the opening credits, a lively Latino angel with a big sombrero dances through the fields of Milagro, New Mexico. Ladd Devine, a real estate mogul, has plans to build a grand vacation resort in the area, potentially the largest in the state. He buys up the land and the water rights, water being at a premium in such a dry climate.

Local resident Joe Mondragon is eager for work at the construction site but faces rejection, despite his willingness to take on any task. He confides in Amarante, an elder neighbour about his concerns over the drought.

Frusrated by his people's loss of water rights on their ancestral lands because of Devine's planned big development, Joe kicks a tap on the irrigation pipe. Water starts to seep into his dry, bare field. He buys pinto beans with his last ten dollars and plants his beanfield.

News of his actions spreads quickly, catching the attention of Ruby Archuleta, who runs a gas station and repair shop. She seeks help from Charlie Bloom, a socially conscious lawyer and publisher, to address the situation.

Meanwhile, sociologist Herbie Platt arrives from the East Coast to study local customs but faces mixed reactions from the residents. Mayor Sammy Cantu remains distant, and Mondragon reluctantly agrees to host Platt in exchange for assistance in the fields.

Mondragon's land is the only plot Devine has not acquired yet. Tensions rise, prompting the state governor to send Kyril Montana to intervene. Efforts to suppress Bloom's coverage fail when newspapers are scattered across town by a wind created by the town's guardian angel, who often has conversations with Amarante, but is unseen by most people. There is a heated community meeting. Bloom helps the people of Milagro understand the full picture. There are still many disagreements and old quarrels.

In the chaos, Bloom is arrested, causing strain between him and Archuleta. The state forestry department tries to seize Mondragon's cow, leading to a standoff defused by Sheriff Bernabe Montoya. Joe Mondragon and Herbie Platt are beaten up one evening when returning home from working in the beanfield. The angel tells Amarante that a big sacrifice will be needed. Joe Mondragon is offered a foreman position at the construction site, causing conflict with his wife and Archuleta.

As tensions escalate, the townsfolk arm themselves. Amarante takes matters into his own hands, shooting at and scaring off the man sent in to plow under Joe Mondragon's bean crop, and driving his big machine off a cliff. While Joe is trying to decide about the job offer, he has to cope with gunshots fired at his house and Amarante's pig in his field. He shoots the pig; Amarante shoots at him and he fires in self-defense, accidentally wounding Amarante. Herbie Platt, along with many others, keeps vigil at Amarante's hospital bed. Platt and Amarante have become friends, with Platt learning a lot from Amarante. Platt prays for Amarante in a way new to him, honoring the local customs.

Joe Mondragon flees to the mountains. Montana pursues Mondragon, who seeks refuge with Shorty. Eventually, Amarante recovers, and he refuses to press charges against Mondragon. When Montana tries to arrest Mondragon on his beanfield, there is a standoff with the whole community involved. At the last moment, word arrives from the governor's office that Devine's big resort development project is being halted. There is a big celebration, with music, dancing, and bean harvesting, culminating in a kiss between Joe Mondragon and his wife Nancy.

== Cast ==
- Rubén Blades as Sheriff Bernabe Montoya
- Richard Bradford as Ladd Devine
- Sônia Braga as Ruby Archuleta
- Julie Carmen as Nancy Mondragon
- James Gammon as "Horsethief Shorty" Wilson
- Melanie Griffith as Flossie Devine
- John Heard as Charlie Bloom
- Carlos Riquelme as Amarante Cordova
- Daniel Stern as Herbie Platt
- Chick Vennera as Joe Mondragon
- Christopher Walken as Kyril Montana
- Freddy Fender as Mayor Sammy Cantú
- Tony Genaro as Nick Rael
- Jerry Hardin as Emerson Capps
- Robert Carricart as Coyote Angel
- M. Emmet Walsh as Governor

== Production ==
According to an article by Patricia Rodriguez in the Fort Worth Star-Telegram, Robert Redford was interested in filming part of the movie in the Plaza del Cerro of Chimayo, New Mexico, which is argued to be the last surviving fortified Spanish plaza in North America. Some locals responded favorably, but many objected to the idea of big business changing the small community, which forced Redford to film the movie in Truchas. Melanie Griffith said that her best scenes were never filmed, because of snow.

In his essay, "Night of the Living Beanfield: How an Unsuccessful Cult Novel Became an Unsuccessful Cult Film in Only Fourteen Years, Eleven Nervous Breakdowns, and $20 Million," John Nichols gives an account of the film project as he saw it. Nichols also described the origin of the novel and the making of the film in the biographical documentary, The Milagro Man: The Irrepressible Multicultural Life and Literary Times of John Nichols, which premiered at the 2012 Albuquerque Film Festival.

== Reception ==
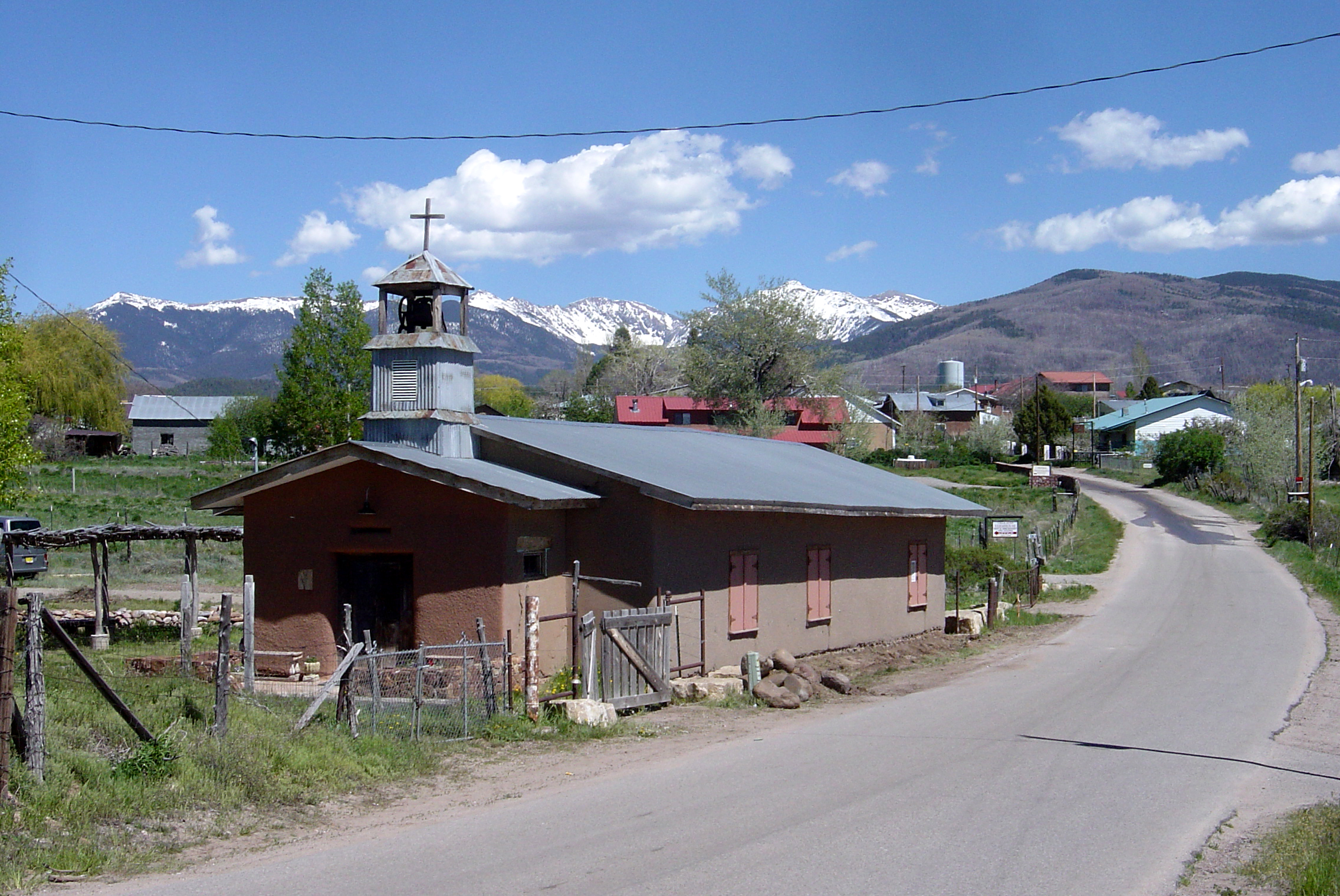
Redford filmed in Truchas, New Mexico.

=== Box office ===
The film's premiere in three cities was called "risky" and "disappointing" by industry analysts.

=== Critical response ===
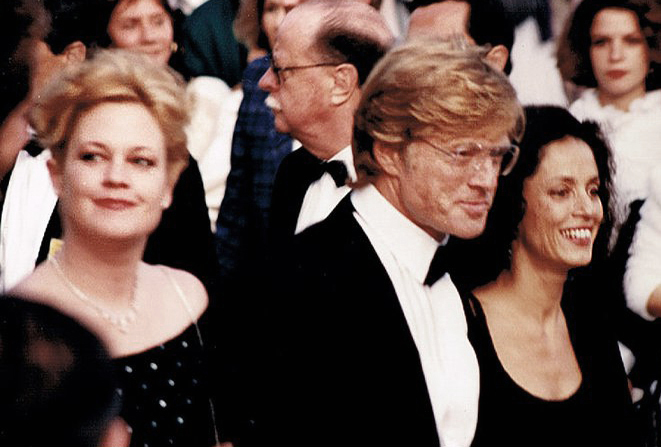
Melanie Griffith, Robert Redford and Sônia Braga promoting the film at the 1988 Cannes Film Festival

The film received mixed reviews from critics. Vincent Canby, film critic for The New York Times, believes the film missed its mark, and wrote, "The screenplay, by David Ward and John Nichols, based on Mr. Nichols's novel, is jammed with underdeveloped, would-be colorful characters, including a philosophical Chicano angel, who face a succession of fearful confrontations with the law that come to nothing. The narrative is a veritable fiesta of anticlimaxes, from the time the sun sets at the beginning of the film until it sets, yet again, behind the closing credits."

Roger Ebert also gave the film a mixed review and had problems with the film's context, writing, "The result is a wonderful fable, but the problem is, some of the people in the story know it's a fable and others do not. This causes an uncertainty that runs all through the film, making it hard to weigh some scenes against others. There are characters who seem to belong in an angry documentary—like Devine, who wants to turn Milagro into a plush New Mexico resort town. And then there are characters who seem to come from a more fanciful time, like Mondragon, whose original rebellion is more impulsive than studied."

Critic Richard Scheib liked the film's direction and the characters portrayed. He wrote, "Redford arrays a colorfully earthy ensemble of characters. The plot falls into place with lazy, deceptive ease. Redford places it up against a gently barbed level of social commentary, although this is something that comes surprisingly light-heartedly. There's an enchantment to the film – at times it is a more successful version of the folklore fable that Francis Ford Coppola's Finian's Rainbow (1968) tried to be but failed."

Scheib believes the film is "one of the first American films to fall into the Latin American tradition of magical realism. This is a genre that usually involves an earthily naturalistic, often highly romanticized, blend of the supernatural and whimsical."

The review aggregator Rotten Tomatoes reported that 61% of critics gave the film a positive rating, based on 33 reviews. The consensus states: "Arguably Robert Redford's most inchoate work, The Milagro Beanfield War has plenty of beautiful moments, but they don't quite add up to a worthwhile whole."

The film was screened out of competition at the 1988 Cannes Film Festival.

=== Accolades ===
Wins

- 61st Academy Awards: Oscar; Best Music, Original Score, Dave Grusin; 1989.
- Political Film Society: PFS Award; Democracy; 1989.

Nominations

- Golden Globes: Golden Globe; Best Original Score - Motion Picture, Dave Grusin; 1989.
- Political Film Society: PFS Award; Exposé; 1989.

== Soundtrack ==
Veteran jazz pianist and composer Dave Grusin contributed the film's original music. A formal soundtrack album has never been released, although tracks from the score were included as a bonus suite on Grusin's 1989 album Migration.
