= 2023 in film =

2023 in film is an overview of events, including the highest-grossing films, award ceremonies, critics' lists of the best films of 2023, festivals, a list of country-specific lists of films released, and movie programming. Wings, known for being the first film to win the Academy Award for Best Picture, entered the public domain this year.

A large number of the year's films significantly underperformed at the box office, attributed to high budgets and low marketing due to the 2023 Hollywood labor disputes.

== Evaluation of the year ==
In his article highlighting the best movies of 2023, Richard Brody of The New Yorker said, "Though a year in movie releases is a small and arbitrary sample size, it's nonetheless clear that, at the moment, the art of cinema is in good shape in the United States. The overwhelming commercial success of two of the year's strangest big-budget films, Oppenheimer and Barbie, released on the same day this summer, is an obvious sign of the vigor of the cinemascape. But the more crucial indicator of vitality preceded their release by several years—namely, the moments when these projects got the green light from their respective studios. One has blown far beyond the billion-dollar mark, and the other is approaching it, at precisely the moment that the superhero-industrial complex seems to be tottering. However, the studios are hardly the artistic center of the American cinema; they're just one element in an environment that is fostering ongoing artistic progress. Deep-pocketed streaming services that can afford to compete with the studios—and even outbid them—have an incentive to prove themselves as purveyors not just of quantity but of quality, including by competing for awards. As for independent production companies, they can—and must—take chances on inexperienced filmmakers with big ideas and on audacious projects by acclaimed filmmakers with the name recognition to help sell them."

Despite the Barbenheimer phenomenon becoming, described by many, the defining cinematic event of the 2020s, 2023 saw however an unusually large number of high-profile, big-budget films which subsequently under-performed at the box office, leading to the coining of the term "flopbuster". Several of the most prominent tent-pole films of 2023 which under-performed include Ant-Man and the Wasp: Quantumania, Shazam! Fury of the Gods, Dungeons & Dragons: Honor Among Thieves, Transformers: Rise of the Beasts, The Flash, Indiana Jones and the Dial of Destiny, Mission: Impossible – Dead Reckoning Part One, Blue Beetle, Expend4bles, Haunted Mansion, The Marvels, and Wish. Many reasons have been given for the phenomenon, with the most common being the high budgets (and thus increased thresholds for breaking even and making a profit), low marketing due to the 2023 Hollywood labor disputes, and a general perception that audiences had grown tired of the abundance of superhero-themed movies, a trend which came to be known as "superhero fatigue".

== Highest-grossing films ==
Highest-grossing films of 2023
Rank	Title	Distributor	Worldwide gross
1	Barbie	Warner Bros.	$1,448,232,531
2	The Super Mario Bros. Movie	Universal	$1,360,847,665
3	Oppenheimer	Universal	$975,811,333
4	Guardians of the Galaxy Vol. 3	Disney	$845,555,777
5	Fast X	Universal	$714,875,015
6	Spider-Man: Across the Spider-Verse	Sony	$690,824,738
7	Full River Red	China Film Group	$670,491,959
8	Wonka	Warner Bros.	$634,681,815
9	The Wandering Earth 2	China Film Group	$615,023,132
10	Mission: Impossible – Dead Reckoning Part One	Paramount	$571,125,435

=== Box office records ===
- Barbie became the 53rd film overall to gross $1 billion worldwide.
  - It became the highest grossing comedy film, surpassing Hi Mom (2021).
  - It surpassed Jia Ling's Hi, Mom (2021) to become the highest-grossing movie with a solo female director.
  - It had the largest domestic opening weekend for a film that is not a sequel, remake, or superhero property, totaling $162 million.
  - It also achieved the largest opening weekend for a female-directed film, surpassing the record set by Captain Marvel (2019).
  - It had the highest opening weekend for a Margot Robbie film and a Ryan Gosling film, surpassing Suicide Squad (2016) and Blade Runner 2049 (2017) simultaneously, later becoming both actors' highest-grossing films.
  - It surpassed The Secret Life of Pets (2016) to have the highest non-sequel July opening weekend.
  - It became the fastest Warner Bros. film to reach the $1 billion mark, doing so within 17 days of release, surpassing the previous 19-day record held by Harry Potter and the Deathly Hallows – Part 2 (2011).
  - Its second weekend domestic earnings of $92 million (a 43% drop) was the largest sophomore weekend ever for a Warner Bros. film and the seventh-largest ever.
  - It became the highest-grossing Warner Bros. film in the United States and Canada, surpassing The Dark Knight (2008).
  - It became the highest-grossing film released by Warner Bros. at the global box office, surpassing Harry Potter and the Deathly Hallows – Part 2 (2011).
  - It became the first comedy film to gross over $1 billion.
  - It became the first film since the COVID-19 pandemic was declared no longer a global emergency to gross $1 billion.
- The Super Mario Bros. Movie became the first film based on a video game, the eleventh animated film, and the 52nd film overall, to gross $1 billion worldwide.
  - It became Illumination's highest-grossing film, as well as the highest-grossing non-Disney animated film of all time, surpassing Minions (2015). It was later surpassed as the highest-grossing non-Disney animated film by Ne Zha 2 in 2025 but remains Illumination's highest-grossing film.
  - It surpassed 2019's Frozen II as having the highest-grossing opening worldwide for an animated film, grossing $375.6 million.
  - It achieved the highest-grossing opening for a video game adaptation worldwide, surpassing 2019's Detective Pikachu.
  - The film achieved the second-highest-grossing opening weekend in the US and Canada for an animated film behind Incredibles 2 (2018), earning $146 million in a 3-day frame and $204 million in a 5-day frame over Easter weekend.
  - It set the record for the biggest five-day opening weekend (for films opening on Wednesday) in North America, surpassing Transformers: Revenge of the Fallen (2009).
  - It set the record for Illumination's biggest opening, surpassing Despicable Me 2 (2013).
  - It became the highest-grossing video game film of all time, surpassing Warcraft (2016) in nine days by 13 April.
  - It became the first animated film to gross $1 billion since the COVID-19 pandemic began in 2019. Also, it became the last film to gross $1 billion before the COVID-19 Pandemic was declared no longer a global emergency. The last animated film to do so prior to this was Frozen II.
  - In Japan, its opening weekend gross of $14.3 million became the highest for a Hollywood animated film, as well as the highest for a film from Universal, surpassing Jurassic World Dominion (2022).
  - In Mexico, it became the highest-grossing film of all time with $82.4 million, surpassing Spider-Man: No Way Home (2021) which made $81.16 million.
  - The Mario franchise surpass $1 billion.
- Oppenheimer became the highest-grossing World War II film of all time, surpassing Dunkirk (2017), also directed by Christopher Nolan.
  - It became the highest-grossing biographical film of all time, surpassing Bohemian Rhapsody (2018).
  - It is the second-highest-grossing R-rated film of all time behind Joker (2019) and the highest-grossing opening weekend for an R-rated film since the COVID-19 pandemic.
  - It is the fourth-highest grossing IMAX release of all time, accumulating $184 million (20% of the film's total worldwide gross) through IMAX theaters alone, including $17 million from 30 IMAX 70 mm film screens around the world.
  - It became Nolan's highest-grossing film in over 50 overseas markets, including Germany, India, Brazil, Saudi Arabia and the United Kingdom.
- The Marvel Cinematic Universe became the first film franchise to gross $29 billion with the releases of Ant-Man and the Wasp: Quantumania, Guardians of the Galaxy Vol. 3, and The Marvels.
- The Spider-Man franchise became the third film franchise to gross $10 billion with the release of Spider-Man: Across the Spider-Verse.
  - Spider-Man: Across the Spider-Verse became the highest-grossing animated film distributed by Sony Pictures, surpassing Hotel Transylvania 3: Summer Vacation (2018).
  - It also became Sony Pictures Animation's highest-grossing film, surpassing The Smurfs (2011).
  - It had the highest opening weekend for a Sony Pictures Animation film, surpassing Hotel Transylvania 2 (2015).
- Taylor Swift: The Eras Tour became the highest-grossing concert film of all time.
  - It also became the highest opening for a concert film of all time, and the second-highest opening in October of all time behind Joker.
- Transformers franchise grossed $5 billion with the release of Transformers: Rise of the Beasts.
- Mission Impossible franchise grossed $4 billion with the release of Mission: Impossible – Dead Reckoning.
- The Hunger Games franchise grossed $3 billion with the release of The Hunger Games: The Ballad of Songbirds & Snakes.
- John Wick franchise grossed $1 billion with the release of John Wick: Chapter 4.

== Events ==
- 2 May – 27 September – The Writers Guild of America (WGA) commences a strike against film and television studios, its first labor stoppage since 2007 and the largest production stoppage for the American entertainment industry since 2020, after the union and the Alliance of Motion Picture and Television Producers (AMPTP) failed to agree on a new contract by the WGA's 1 May renewal deadline. Other writers unions such as the Writers' Guild of Great Britain, Australian Writers' Guild, Writers Guild of Canada subsequently announce their support for the strike and instructed their members to refrain from working on American projects during the duration of the strike, impacted several film productions and releases. The WGA later declared the strike over on 27 September, three days after the Guild and AMPTP reached a tentative agreement.
- 14 July – 9 November – SAG-AFTRA commences a strike against film and television studios, after the union and the AMPTP failed to agree on a new contract after their previous agreement expired on 30 June. This marks the first time that actors have initiated a labor dispute since the 1980 actors strike. With the concurrent WGA strike, this becomes the first time that actors and writers have walked out simultaneously since 1960. Film projects produced by these American studios but made outside the U.S. may also be affected by the strike. However, actors represented by another union, such as Equity in the UK, may instead be required to continue working on projects.
- 21 July – The Barbenheimer phenomenon occurs as Greta Gerwig's Barbie and Christopher Nolan's Oppenheimer are released in theaters on the same day. The opening weekend box office was the first time two films opened with over $100m and $80m in the same weekend, the biggest box office weekend since before the COVID-19 pandemic, and the fourth-biggest weekend of all time.

=== Award ceremonies ===
2023 film award ceremonies
Date	Event	Host	Location(s)	Ref.
8 January	National Board of Review Awards 2022	National Board of Review	New York City, New York, U.S.	
10 January	80th Golden Globe Awards	Hollywood Foreign Press Association	Beverly Hills, California, U.S.	
15 January	28th Critics' Choice Awards	Broadcast Film Critics Association	Los Angeles, California, U.S.	
22 January	15th Gaudí Awards	Catalan Film Academy	Barcelona, Catalonia, Spain	
28 January	10th Feroz Awards	Asociación de Informadores Cinematográficos de España	Zaragoza, Aragon, Spain	
4 February	2nd Carmen Awards	Andalusian Film Academy	Almería, Andalusia, Spain	
11 February	37th Goya Awards	Academy of Cinematographic Arts and Sciences of Spain	Seville, Andalusia, Spain	
11 February	Make-Up Artists and Hair Stylists Guild Awards 2022	Dyson and HASK Beauty	Beverly Hills, California, U.S.	
18 February	75th Directors Guild of America Awards	Directors Guild of America	Beverly Hills, California, U.S.	
19 February	76th British Academy Film Awards	British Academy of Film and Television Arts	London, England, UK	
25 February	50th Annie Awards	ASIFA-Hollywood	Los Angeles, California, U.S.	
25 February	54th NAACP Image Awards	NAACP	Pasadena, California, U.S.	
25 February	34th Producers Guild of America Awards	Producers Guild of America	Beverly Hills, California, U.S.	
26 February	29th Screen Actors Guild Awards	SAG-AFTRA	Los Angeles, California, U.S.	
4 March	38th Independent Spirit Awards	Independent Spirit Awards	Santa Monica, California, U.S.	
4 March	Cinema Audio Society Awards 2022	Cinema Audio Society Awards	Los Angeles, California, U.S.	
4 March	12th Magritte Awards	Académie André Delvaux	Brussels, Belgium	
5 March	75th Writers Guild of America Awards	Writers Guild of America, East; Writers Guild of America West	Los Angeles, California, U.S.	
5 March	2022 American Society of Cinematographers Awards	American Society of Cinematographers	Beverly Hills, California, U.S.	
11 March	43rd Golden Raspberry Awards	Golden Raspberry Awards Foundation	Los Angeles, California, U.S.	
12 March	95th Academy Awards	Academy of Motion Picture Arts and Sciences	Los Angeles, California, U.S.	
12 March	16th Asian Film Awards	The Asian Film Awards Academy	Hong Kong Jockey Club Auditorium, Hong Kong	
13 March	31st Actors and Actresses Union Awards	Actors and Actresses Union	Madrid, Spain	
16 April	41st Hong Kong Film Awards	Hong Kong Film Awards Association Ltd.	Hong Kong Cultural Centre, Hong Kong	
16 April	11th Canadian Screen Awards	Academy of Canadian Cinema & Television	Toronto, Ontario, Canada	
22 April	10th Platino Awards	EGEDA, FIPCA	Madrid, Spain	
27 April	68th Filmfare Awards	The Times Group	Mumbai, Maharashtra, India	
10 May	68th David di Donatello	Accademia del Cinema Italiano	Rome, Italy	
26–27 May	23rd International Indian Film Academy Awards	International Indian Film Academy	Abu Dhabi, United Arab Emirates	
9 September	65th Ariel Awards	Academia Mexicana de Artes y Ciencias Cinematográficas	Guadalajara, Jalisco, Mexico	
5 October	32nd Buil Film Awards	Busan Ilbo	Busan, South Korea	
4 November	36th Golden Rooster Awards	China Film Association	Xiamen, China	
5 November	11th Macondo Awards	Colombian Academy of Cinematography Arts and Sciences	Bogotá, Colombia	
24 November	44th Blue Dragon Film Awards	Sports Chosun	Yeouido, South Korea	
16 December	29th Forqué Awards	EGEDA	Madrid, Spain	

=== Film festivals ===
2023 film festivals
Date	Event	Host	Location(s)	Ref.
19 – 29 January	2023 Sundance Film Festival	Sundance Film Festival	Park City, Utah, United States	
25 January – 5 February	52nd International Film Festival Rotterdam	International Film Festival Rotterdam	Rotterdam, Netherlands	
16 – 26 February	73rd Berlin International Film Festival	Berlin International Film Festival	Berlin, Germany	
1 – 12 March	19th Glasgow Film Festival	Glasgow Film Festival	Glasgow, Scotland	
10 – 19 March	26th Málaga Film Festival	Málaga Film Festival	Málaga, Spain	
16 – 27 May	2023 Cannes Film Festival	Cannes Film Festival	Cannes, France	
3 – 9 June	38th Guadalajara International Film Festival	Guadalajara International Film Festival	Guadalajara, Mexico	
30 June – 8 July	57th Karlovy Vary International Film Festival	Karlovy Vary International Film Festival	Karlovy Vary, Czech Republic	
14 – 30 July	22nd New York Asian Film Festival	New York Asian Film Foundation Inc.	New York, U.S.	
2 – 12 August	76th Locarno Film Festival	Locarno Film Festival	Locarno, Switzerland	
30 August – 9 September	80th Venice International Film Festival	Venice International Film Festival	Venice, Italy	
31 August – 4 September	50th Telluride Film Festival	Telluride Film Festival	Telluride, Colorado, United States	
7 – 17 September	2023 Toronto International Film Festival	Toronto International Film Festival	Toronto, Ontario, Canada	
22 – 30 September	71st San Sebastián International Film Festival	San Sebastián International Film Festival	San Sebastián, Spain	
29 September – 15 October	2023 New York Film Festival	New York Film Festival	New York, United States	
4 – 13 October	28th Busan International Film Festival	Busan International Film Festival	Busan, South Korea	
4 – 15 October	67th BFI London Film Festival	BFI London Film Festival	London, United Kingdom	
5 – 15 October	56th Sitges Film Festival	Sitges Film Festival	Sitges, Spain	
21 – 28 October	68th Valladolid International Film Festival	Valladolid International Film Festival	Valladolid, Spain	
23 October – 1 November	36th Tokyo International Film Festival	Tokyo International Film Festival	Tokyo, Japan	
20–28 November	54th International Film Festival of India	Directorate of Film Festivals	Goa, India	

== Awards ==
Category	81st Golden Globe Awards January 7, 2024		29th Critics' Choice Awards January 14, 2024	77th BAFTA Awards February 18, 2024	96th Academy Awards March 10, 2024	Directors, Producers, Screen Actors and Writers Guild Awards February 10 – April 14, 2024
Category	Drama	Musical or Comedy	29th Critics' Choice Awards January 14, 2024	77th BAFTA Awards February 18, 2024	96th Academy Awards March 10, 2024	Directors, Producers, Screen Actors and Writers Guild Awards February 10 – April 14, 2024
Best Picture	Oppenheimer	Poor Things	Oppenheimer			
Best Director	Christopher Nolan; Oppenheimer					
Best Actor	Cillian Murphy; Oppenheimer	Paul Giamatti; The Holdovers		Cillian Murphy; Oppenheimer		
Best Actress	Lily Gladstone; Killers of the Flower Moon	Emma Stone; Poor Things				Lily Gladstone; Killers of the Flower Moon
Best Supporting Actor	Robert Downey Jr. Oppenheimer					
Best Supporting Actress	Da'Vine Joy Randolph; The Holdovers					
Best Screenplay, Adapted	Justine Triet and Arthur Harari; Anatomy of a Fall		Cord Jefferson; American Fiction			
Best Screenplay, Original	Justine Triet and Arthur Harari; Anatomy of a Fall		Greta Gerwig and Noah Baumbach; Barbie	Justine Triet and Arthur Harari; Anatomy of a Fall		David Hemingson; The Holdovers
Best Animated Film	The Boy and the Heron		Spider-Man: Across the Spider-Verse	The Boy and the Heron		Spider-Man: Across the Spider-Verse
Best Original Score	Ludwig Göransson; Oppenheimer					—N/a
Best Original Song	"What Was I Made For?"; Barbie		"I'm Just Ken"; Barbie	—N/a	"What Was I Made For?"; Barbie	—N/a
Best Foreign Language Film	Anatomy of a Fall			The Zone of Interest		—N/a
Best Documentary (Note: From 2016 onward, the category was shifted from the Critics' Choice Awards to the ancillary Critics' Choice Documentary Awards.)	—N/a		Still: A Michael J. Fox Movie	20 Days in Mariupol		American Symphony

Palme d'Or (76th Cannes Film Festival):

Anatomy of a Fall (Anatomie d'une chute), directed by Justine Triet, France

Golden Lion (80th Venice International Film Festival):

Poor Things, directed by Yorgos Lanthimos, Greece

Golden Bear (73rd Berlin International Film Festival):

On the Adamant (Sur l'Adamant), directed by Nicolas Philibert, France

People's Choice Award (48th Toronto International Film Festival):

American Fiction, directed by Cord Jefferson, United States

== 2023 films ==
=== By country/region ===
- List of American films of 2023
- List of Argentine films of 2023
- List of Australian films of 2023
- List of Bangladeshi films of 2023
- List of British films of 2023
- List of Canadian films of 2023
- List of Chinese films of 2023
- List of French films of 2023
- List of German films of 2023
- List of Hong Kong films of 2023
- List of Indian films of 2023
- List of Italian films of 2023
- List of Japanese films of 2023
- List of Mexican films of 2023
- List of Pakistani films of 2023
- List of Philippine films of 2023
- List of Russian films of 2023
- List of South Korean films of 2023
- List of Spanish films of 2023
- List of Turkish films of 2023
- List of Yemeni films of 2023

=== By genre/medium ===
- List of action films of 2023
- List of animated feature films of 2023
- List of avant-garde films of 2023
- List of crime films of 2023
- List of comedy films of 2023
- List of drama films of 2023
- List of horror films of 2023
- List of LGBT-related films of 2023
- List of science fiction films of 2023
- List of thriller films of 2023
- List of western films of 2023

== Deaths ==
Month	Date	Name	Age	Country	Profession	Notable films	Ref.
January	1	Jacques Sereys	94	France	Actor	The Fire Within; The Horseman on the Roof	
January	2	Frank Galati	79	US	Screenwriter, Actor	The Accidental Tourist; The Party Animal	
January	3	James D. Brubaker	85	US	Producer	Bruce Almighty; The Right Stuff	
January	3	Joseph Koo	91	Hong Kong	Composer	The Way of the Dragon; Fist of Fury	
January	4	Miiko Taka	97	US	Actress	Sayonara; The Art of Love	
January	5	Earl Boen	81	US	Actor	The Terminator; To Be or Not to Be	
January	5	Mike Hill	73	US	Film Editor	Apollo 13; A Beautiful Mind	
January	5	Michael Snow	94	Canada	Director	Wavelength; La Région Centrale	
January	6	Annette McCarthy	64	US	Actress	Creature; Second Thoughts	
January	6	Owen Roizman	86	US	Cinematographer	The Exorcist; The French Connection	
January	7	Zinaid Memišević	72	Bosnia	Actor	Miracle; 2012	
January	7	Dorothy Tristan	88	US	Actress, Screenwriter	Klute; Down and Out in Beverly Hills	
January	9	Melinda Dillon	83	US	Actress	Close Encounters of the Third Kind; A Christmas Story	
January	10	He Ping	65	China	Director, Producer, Screenwriter	Sun Valley; Warriors of Heaven and Earth	
January	11	Carole Cook	98	US	Actress	American Gigolo; Sixteen Candles	
January	11	Piers Haggard	83	UK	Director	Wedding Night; The Blood on Satan's Claw	
January	11	Charles Kimbrough	86	US	Actor	The Hunchback of Notre Dame; The Wedding Planner	
January	11	Ben Masters	75	US	Actor	All That Jazz; Dream Lover	
January	12	Brian Tufano	83	UK	Cinematographer	Trainspotting; Billy Elliot	
January	13 (Note: The day he went missing. It is unknown if he died on that day.)	Julian Sands	65	UK	Actor	A Room with a View; Naked Lunch	
January	13	Yoshio Yoda	88	Japan	Actor	The Horizontal Lieutenant; McHale's Navy	
January	14	Wally Campo	99	US	Actor	The Little Shop of Horrors; Tales of Terror	
January	14	Inna Churikova	79	Russia	Actress	Jack Frost; Walking the Streets of Moscow	
January	15	Andrew Jones	39	UK	Director, Producer, Screenwriter	The Amityville Asylum; Robert	
January	15	Vakhtang Kikabidze	84	Georgia	Actor, Singer	Don't Grieve; Mimino	
January	16	Gina Lollobrigida	95	Italy	Actress	Buona Sera, Mrs. Campbell; Trapeze	
January	16	Giorgio Mariuzzo	83	Italy	Screenwriter, Director	Apache Woman; The House by the Cemetery	
January	17	Edward R. Pressman	79	US	Producer	Conan the Barbarian; American Psycho	
January	17	Sandra Seacat	86	US	Actress	Frances; Palo Alto	
January	18	Donn Cambern	93	US	Film Editor	Easy Rider; Romancing the Stone	
January	19	Sumitra Peries	87	Sri Lanka	Director, Film Editor	Gehenu Lamai; Ganga Addara	
January	19	Yoon Jeong-hee	78	South Korea	Actress	Poetry; Oyster Village	
January	20	Tim Barlow	87	UK	Actor	Les Misérables; Hot Fuzz	
January	22	Mario Pupella	77	Italy	Actor	The Sicilian Girl; Salvo	
January	22	Agustí Villaronga	69	Spain	Director, Screenwriter, Actor	In a Glass Cage; Black Bread	
January	23	Eugenio Martín	97	Spain	Director, Screenwriter	Horror Express; A Candle for the Devil	
January	23	Everett Quinton	71	US	Actor	Natural Born Killers; Pollock	
January	24	Lance Kerwin	62	US	Actor	Enemy Mine; Outbreak	
January	25	Cindy Williams	75	US	Actress	American Graffiti; The Conversation	
January	27	Robert Dalva	80	US	Film Editor	The Black Stallion; October Sky	
January	27	Gregory Allen Howard	70	US	Screenwriter	Remember the Titans; Harriet	
January	27	Sylvia Syms	89	UK	Actress	The Tamarind Seed; The Queen	
January	28	Gérard Caillaud	76	France	Actor	Until September; Fanfan	
January	28	Lisa Loring	64	US	Actress	Iced; Blood Frenzy	
January	28	Adama Niane	56	France	Actor	Baise-moi; Get In	
January	29	George R. Robertson	89	Canada	Actor	Police Academy; Still Mine	
February	1	George P. Wilbur	81	US	Actor, Stuntman	Firestarter; Ghostbusters II	
February	2	Chris Chesser	74	US	Producer	Major League; The Rundown	
February	2	Louis Velle	96	France	Actor	Among Vultures; Kings for a Day	
February	3	Paco Rabanne	88	Spain	Costume Designer	Barbarella; The Last Adventure	
February	3	Sergio Solli	78	Italy	Actor	Ciao, Professore!; Il Postino: The Postman	
February	4	Eugene Iglesias	96	US	Actor	Cowboy; Harper	
February	4	Arnold Schulman	97	US	Screenwriter	Love with the Proper Stranger; Goodbye, Columbus	
February	6	Eugene Lee	83	US	Production Designer	Easy Money; Vanya on 42nd Street	
February	7	Fernando Becerril	78	Mexico	Actor	The Mask of Zorro; Get the Gringo	
February	8	Burt Bacharach	94	US	Composer, Songwriter	Butch Cassidy and the Sundance Kid; Arthur	
February	8	Cody Longo	34	US	Actor	Piranha 3D; Death House	
February	8	Dennis Lotis	97	South Africa	Actor, Singer	The City of the Dead; Sword of Sherwood Forest	
February	10	Hugh Hudson	86	UK	Director	Chariots of Fire; My Life So Far	
February	10	Carlos Saura	91	Spain	Director, Screenwriter	The Hunt; Cría cuervos	
February	11	James Flynn	57	Ireland	Producer	Calvary; The Banshees of Inisherin	
February	12	Vadim Abdrashitov	78	Ukraine	Director	The Train Has Stopped; Planet Parade	
February	12	Billy Two Rivers	87	Canada	Actor	Black Robe; Taking Lives	
February	13	Alain Goraguer	91	France	Composer	Fantastic Planet; Love Me No More	
February	13	Tom Luddy	79	US	Producer	Barfly; The Secret Garden	
February	13	Zia Mohyeddin	91	Pakistan	Actor	Lawrence of Arabia; Khartoum	
February	13	Oliver Wood	80	UK	Cinematographer	The Bourne Identity; Face/Off	
February	15	Kerstin Tidelius	88	Sweden	Actress	Fanny and Alexander; Ådalen 31	
February	15	Raquel Welch	82	US	Actress	Fantastic Voyage; One Million Years B.C.	
February	16	Michel Deville	91	France	Director, Screenwriter	Death in a French Garden; The Reader	
February	17	Gerald Fried	95	US	Composer	The Killing; Paths of Glory	
February	17	George T. Miller	79	UK	Director	The Man from Snowy River; The NeverEnding Story II	
February	17	Stella Stevens	84	US	Actress	The Nutty Professor; The Poseidon Adventure	
February	17	Lee Whitlock	54	UK	Actor	Cassandra's Dream; Ill Manors	
February	18	Barbara Bosson	83	US	Actress	Capricorn One; The Last Starfighter	
February	18	Tom Whitlock	68	US	Songwriter	Top Gun; 10 Things I Hate About You	
February	19	Richard Belzer	78	US	Actor, Comedian	Night Shift; Author! Author!	
February	19	Jansen Panettiere	28	US	Actor	The Babysitters; The Secrets of Jonathan Sperry	
February	21	Nadja Tiller	93	Austria	Actress	Le Désordre et la Nuit; Barefoot	
February	22	Kristina Holland	78	US	Actress	The Strawberry Statement; Doctors' Wives	
February	24	Maurizio Costanzo	84	Italy	Screenwriter	A Special Day; The House with Laughing Windows	
February	24	Ed Fury	94	US	Actor	Raw Edge; Ursus	
February	24	Juraj Jakubisko	84	Slovakia	Director, Screenwriter	Birds, Orphans and Fools; The Feather Fairy	
February	24	Walter Mirisch	101	US	Producer	The Magnificent Seven; In the Heat of the Night	
February	25	François Hadji-Lazaro	66	France	Actor	Cemetery Man; The City of Lost Children	
February	25	Gordon Pinsent	92	Canada	Actor, Singer	The Shipping News; Away from Her	
February	27	Ricou Browning	93	US	Director, Stuntman, Actor	Creature from the Black Lagoon; Caddyshack	
February	27	Burny Mattinson	87	US	Animator, Director	The Great Mouse Detective; The Jungle Book	
February	28	Jay Weston	93	US	Producer	Lady Sings the Blues; Buddy Buddy	
March	1	Ted Donaldson	89	US	Actor	A Tree Grows in Brooklyn; Phone Call from a Stranger	
March	2	María Onetto	56	Argentina	Actress	The Headless Woman; Wild Tales	
March	3	Sara Lane	73	US	Actress	I Saw What You Did; The Trial of Billy Jack	
March	3	Tom Sizemore	61	US	Actor	Saving Private Ryan; Black Hawk Down	
March	5	Bob Goody	71	UK	Actor	The Cook, the Thief, His Wife & Her Lover; Peterloo	
March	7	Lisa Janti	89	US	Actress	World Without End; Escape to Burma	
March	8	Bert I. Gordon	100	US	Director, Producer, Screenwriter	The Amazing Colossal Man; Empire of the Ants	
March	8	Chaim Topol	87	Israel	Actor, Singer	Fiddler on the Roof; For Your Eyes Only	
March	9	Robert Blake	89	US	Actor	In Cold Blood; Lost Highway	
March	9	Satish Kaushik	66	India	Actor, Director, Producer	Mr. India; Tere Naam	
March	9	Pearry Reginald Teo	44	Singapore	Director, Producer, Screenwriter	The Gene Generation; The Curse of Sleeping Beauty	
March	11	Ignacio López Tarso	98	Mexico	Actor	Nazarín; Under the Volcano	
March	12	Rolly Crump	93	US	Animator	Peter Pan; One Hundred and One Dalmatians	
March	13	Mario Masini	84	Italy	Cinematographer	Allegro Non Troppo; Padre Padrone	
March	14	Louisette Dussault	82	Canada	Actress	IXE-13; Wedding Night	
March	15	Petros Palian	92	Iran	Cinematographer	An Isfahani in New York; Dangerous Men	
March	15	Norman Steinberg	83	US	Screenwriter, Actor	Blazing Saddles; My Favorite Year	
March	16	Sharon Acker	87	Canada	Actress	Point Blank; Happy Birthday to Me	
March	16	Claude Fournier	91	Canada	Director, Screenwriter, Film Editor	Alien Thunder; The Tin Flute	
March	16	Peter Hardy	66	Australia	Actor	The Pursuit of Happiness; Chopper	
March	17	Hal Dresner	85	US	Screenwriter	The Eiger Sanction; Sssssss	
March	17	Lance Reddick	60	US	Actor	John Wick; Godzilla vs. Kong	
March	17	Laura Valenzuela	92	Spain	Actress	High Fashion; Three Ladies	
March	18	Gloria Dea	100	US	Actress	King of the Congo; Plan 9 from Outer Space	
March	18	Steven Ungerleider	73	US	Producer	End Game; Citizen Ashe	
March	20	Paul Grant	56	UK	Actor, Stuntman	Return of the Jedi; Labyrinth	
March	20	Terry Norris	92	Australia	Actor	Romulus, My Father; Looking for Grace	
March	21	Jacques Haitkin	72	US	Cinematographer	A Nightmare on Elm Street; The Hidden	
March	21	Francesco Maselli	92	Italy	Director, Screenwriter	Time of Indifference; A Tale of Love	
March	21	Peter Werner	76	US	Director	Don't Cry, It's Only Thunder; No Man's Land	
March	23	Tomoko Naraoka	93	Japan	Actress	Dodes'ka-den; Ponyo	
March	25	Chabelo	88	Mexico	Actor, Comedian, Singer	The Extra; Volando bajo	
March	25	Christopher Gunning	78	UK	Composer	La Vie en rose; Firelight	
March	25	Nick Lloyd Webber	43	UK	Composer	Mon Amour Mon Parapluie; The Last Bus	
March	26	Nikolay Dupak	101	Russia	Actor	The Forty-First; Two Comrades Were Serving	
March	26	Ron Faber	90	US	Actor	The Exorcist; Navy SEALs	
March	26	Innocent	75	India	Actor	Manichitrathazhu; Sunny	
March	26	Ivano Marescotti	77	Italy	Actor	The Talented Mr. Ripley; Hannibal	
March	28	Ryuichi Sakamoto	71	Japan	Composer, Actor	The Last Emperor; The Revenant	
March	28	Bill Saluga	85	US	Actor, Comedian	Tunnel Vision; Going Berserk	
March	30	Laura Gómez-Lacueva	48	Spain	Actress, Comedian	The Bride; The Realm	
March	30	Johan Leysen	73	Belgium	Actor	Brotherhood of the Wolf; The American	
March	31	Asja Łamtiugina	82	Poland	Actress	The Scar; Boys Don't Cry	
March	31	Christo Jivkov	48	Bulgaria	Actor	The Passion of the Christ; The Invisible Boy	
April	2	Judy Farrell	84	US	Actress	J. W. Coop; Chapter Two	
April	3	David Finfer	80	US	Film Editor	The Fugitive; Bill & Ted's Bogus Journey	
April	4	Andrés García	81	Dominican Republic	Actor	House of Evil; ¡Tintorera!	
April	5	Bill Butler	101	US	Cinematographer	The Conversation; Jaws	
April	6	Ingvar Hirdwall	88	Sweden	Actor	The Man on the Roof; The Girl with the Dragon Tattoo	
April	6	Norman Reynolds	89	UK	Production Designer, Art Director	Star Wars; Raiders of the Lost Ark	
April	8	Elizabeth Hubbard	89	US	Actress	I Never Sang for My Father; Ordinary People	
April	8	Michael Lerner	81	US	Actor	Barton Fink; Elf	
April	8	Edward L. Rissien	98	US	Producer	Castle Keep; Saint Jack	
April	9	Donald W. Ernst	89	US	Film Editor, Producer	Aladdin; The Brave Little Toaster	
April	9	Richard Ng	83	Hong Kong	Actor	Winners and Sinners; Miracles	
April	11	Carol Locatell	82	US	Actress	Friday the 13th: A New Beginning; Coffy	
April	12	Uttara Baokar	79	India	Actress	Ek Din Achanak; Rukmavati Ki Haveli	
April	12	Ambra Danon	75	Italy	Costume Designer	La Cage aux Folles; La Cage aux Folles II	
April	14	Murray Melvin	90	UK	Actor	Barry Lyndon; The Phantom of the Opera	
April	18	Terrence Hardiman	86	UK	Actor	Gandhi; Sahara	
April	18	Evan Jones	95	Jamaica	Screenwriter	Wake in Fright; Escape to Victory	
April	19	Peter Martin	82	UK	Actor	Funny Bones; Brassed Off	
April	20	John Wright	79	US	Film Editor	The Hunt for Red October; Speed	
April	21	Maria Charles	93	UK	Actress	Victor/Victoria; Hot Fuzz	
April	22	Barry Humphries	89	Australia	Actor	Bedazzled; Finding Nemo	
April	25	Frank Agrama	93	US	Director, Screenwriter, Producer	Queen Kong; Dawn of the Mummy	
April	25	Harry Belafonte	96	US	Actor, Singer	Odds Against Tomorrow; Carmen Jones	
April	25	Gennadi Bogachyov	78	Russia	Actor	Speed; Simple Things	
April	26	Mamukkoya	76	India	Actor	Ustad Hotel; Minnal Murali	
April	26	Dee Dee Wood	95	US	Choreographer	Mary Poppins; The Sound of Music	
April	27	Giovanni Lombardo Radice	68	Italy	Actor	The House on the Edge of the Park; The Church	
April	27	Jerry Springer	79	US	Actor	Ringmaster; Citizen Verdict	
April	27	Barbara Young	92	UK	Actress	Hidden City; The Keeper	
April	28	Peter Lilienthal	93	Germany	Director, Screenwriter, Actor	David; The American Friend	
April	29	Sergei Kolesnikov	68	Russia	Actor	Cold Souls; Black Sea	
April	29	Don Sebesky	85	US	Composer	The People Next Door; The Rosary Murders	
May	1	Per Åhlin	91	Sweden	Director, Animator	Ronia, the Robber's Daughter; The Journey to Melonia	
May	1	Eileen Saki	79	Japan	Actress	Splash; History of the World, Part I	
May	2	Barbara Bryne	94	UK	Actress	Amadeus; The Bostonians	
May	3	Alessandro D'Alatri	68	Italy	Director, Screenwriter	No Skin; Commediasexi	
May	5	Michel Cordes	77	France	Actor	The Horseman on the Roof; Under the Sand	
May	8	Sergey Dreyden	81	Russia	Actor	Russian Ark; Taras Bulba	
May	8	Pema Tseden	53	China	Director, Screenwriter, Producer	Jinpa; Balloon	
May	9	Jacklyn Zeman	70	US	Actress	Class Reunion; Deep in the Valley	
May	10	Enrico Oldoini	77	Italy	Director, Screenwriter	Cuori nella tormenta; 13 at a Table	
May	11	Kenneth Anger	96	US	Director, Screenwriter, Film Editor	Fireworks; Scorpio Rising	
May	11	Guido Gorgatti	103	Argentina	Actor	An American in Buenos Aires; Would You Marry Me?	
May	11	Barry Newman	92	US	Actor	Vanishing Point; Bowfinger	
May	14	John Refoua	58	US	Film Editor	Avatar; The Equalizer	
May	14	Samantha Weinstein	28	Canada	Actress	The Rocker; Carrie	
May	15	Sharon Farrell	82	US	Actress	Night of the Comet; The Stunt Man	
May	16	P. K. R. Pillai	92	India	Producer	Amrutham Gamaya; Chithram	
May	17	Dvora Kedar	98	Israel	Actress	Lemon Popsicle; Going Steady	
May	18	Helmut Berger	78	Austria	Actor	The Garden of the Finzi-Continis; Ludwig	
May	18	Jim Brown	87	US	Actor	The Dirty Dozen; The Running Man	
May	18	Marlene Clark	85	US	Actress	Ganja & Hess; Switchblade Sisters	
May	21	Leon Ichaso	74	Cuba	Director, Screenwriter	Azúcar Amarga; El Cantante	
May	21	Lew Palter	94	US	Actor	First Monday in October; Titanic	
May	21	Ray Stevenson	58	Ireland	Actor	King Arthur; RRR	
May	24	Bill Lee	94	US	Composer	Do the Right Thing; She's Gotta Have It	
May	24	George Maharis	94	US	Actor	Exodus; The Sword and the Sorcerer	
May	24	Tina Turner	83	US	Singer, Actress	Tommy; Mad Max Beyond Thunderdome	
May	25	Glenn Farr	77	US	Film Editor	The Right Stuff; Commando	
May	25	Mac Gudgeon	74	Australia	Screenwriter	Wind; Last Ride	
May	25	Gary Kent	89	US	Actor, Stuntman	Targets; Bubba Ho-Tep	
May	28	Isa Barzizza	93	Italy	Actress	The Two Orphans; We All Loved Each Other So Much	
May	29	Michel Côté	72	Canada	Actor	Cruising Bar; C.R.A.Z.Y.	
May	29	Peter Simonischek	76	Austria	Actor	Toni Erdmann; Kursk	
May	30	John Beasley	79	US	Actor	Rudy; The Apostle	
May	30	Milka Zimková	71	Slovakia	Actress	She Grazed Horses on Concrete; Why?	
May	31	Sergio Calderón	77	US	Actor	Men in Black; Pirates of the Caribbean: At World's End	
May	31	Patricia Dainton	93	UK	Actress	The House in Marsh Road; The Third Alibi	
May	31	Jacques Rozier	96	France	Director, Screenwriter	Adieu Philippine; Du Cote D'Orouet	
June	1	Michael Batayeh	52	US	Actor, Comedian	American Dreamz; AmericanEast	
June	1	Margit Carstensen	83	Germany	Actress	The Bitter Tears of Petra von Kant; Possession	
June	1	Cynthia Weil	82	US	Songwriter	National Lampoon's Christmas Vacation; An American Tail	
June	3	Paul Geoffrey	68	UK	Actor	Excalibur; Greystoke: The Legend of Tarzan, Lord of the Apes	
June	3	John Regala	55	Philippines	Actor	Kinatay; The Road	
June	6	Pat Cooper	93	US	Actor, Comedian	Analyze This; Analyze That	
June	6	Paul Eckstein	59	US	Actor	Hoodlum; Seven	
June	6	Noreen Nash	99	US	Actress	The Southerner; Giant	
June	8	Peter Belli	79	Denmark	Actor, Singer	Truly Human; Koko-di Koko-da	
June	10	Fakhri Khorvash	94	Iran	Actress	Mr. Naive; Chess of the Wind	
June	11	Rob Young	76	Canada	Sound Engineer	Unforgiven; X2	
June	12	Michael Catt	70	US	Producer	Fireproof; Courageous	
June	12	Francesco Nuti	68	Italy	Actor, Director, Screenwriter	All the Fault of Paradise; The Pool Hustlers	
June	12	Treat Williams	71	US	Actor	Hair; Prince of the City	
June	14	Raimondo Crociani	77	Italy	Film Editor	A Special Day; Le Bal	
June	15	Patrick Guzman	55	Canada	Actor	Mahirap Maging Pogi; O-Ha! Ako Pa?	
June	15	Glenda Jackson	87	UK	Actress	Women in Love; A Touch of Class	
June	16	Angela Thorne	84	UK	Actress	Bright Young Things; Lassie	
June	16	Paxton Whitehead	85	UK	Actor	Back to School; Kate & Leopold	
June	18	Sheldon Bergstrom	51	Canada	Actor	The Humanity Bureau; SuperGrid	
June	23	Margia Dean	101	US	Actress	The Quatermass Xperiment; I Shot Jesse James	
June	23	Frederic Forrest	86	US	Actor	Apocalypse Now; Falling Down	
June	23	Malcolm Mowbray	74	UK	Director, Screenwriter	A Private Function; Don't Tell Her It's Me	
June	23	Kunto Ojansivu	63	Finland	Actor	Rentun Ruusu; Sibelius	
June	23	Betta St. John	93	US	Actress, Singer	The Robe; The City of the Dead	
June	24	Dodie Heath	96	US	Actress	Brigadoon; The Diary of Anne Frank	
June	24	Dean Smith	91	US	Actor, Stuntman	The Sugarland Express; Christine	
June	26	Nicolas Coster	89	UK	Actor	All the President's Men; Stir Crazy	
June	27	Carmen Sevilla	92	Spain	Actress, Singer	Imperial Violets; King of Kings	
June	29	Alan Arkin	89	US	Actor, Director, Screenwriter	The Heart Is a Lonely Hunter; Little Miss Sunshine	
June	29	Angel Wagenstein	100	Bulgaria	Screenwriter	Stars; Goya or the Hard Way to Enlightenment	
June	30	Eva Maria Daniels	43	Iceland	Producer	What Maisie Knew; Hold the Dark	
June	30	Judi Farr	84	Australia	Actress	Oscar and Lucinda; December Boys	
June	30	Laird Koenig	95	US	Screenwriter	The Little Girl Who Lives Down the Lane; Bloodline	
July	1	Robert Lieberman	75	US	Director	Fire in the Sky; D3: The Mighty Ducks	
July	1	Lawrence Turman	96	US	Producer	The Graduate; American History X	
July	4	Amer Alwan	66	Iraq	Director, Actor, Cinematographer	Back to Babylon; The Girl on the Train	
July	5	Coco Lee	48	China	Actress, Singer	Mulan; Crouching Tiger, Hidden Dragon	
July	6	Jeffrey Carlson	48	US	Actor, Singer	Hitch; The Killing Floor	
July	6	Jimmy Weldon	99	US	Actor	The Phantom Planet; Americathon	
July	8	Srđan Koljević	56	Serbia	Director, Screenwriter	Klopka; Circles	
July	8	Özkan Uğur	69	Turkey	Actor	The Bandit; G.O.R.A.	
July	9	Manny Coto	62	US	Director, Screenwriter	Dr. Giggles; Star Kid	
July	10	Randy Fullmer	73	US	Animator, Producer	Who Framed Roger Rabbit; Beauty and the Beast	
July	11	Mirsad Tuka	58	Bosnia	Actor	Underground; Cirkus Columbia	
July	12	Daniel Goldberg	74	Canada	Producer, Screenwriter	The Hangover; Stripes	
July	12	John Nettleton	94	UK	Actor	A Man for All Seasons; Oliver Twist	
July	13	Josephine Chaplin	74	US	Actress	The Canterbury Tales; Cop au Vin	
July	13	Carlin Glynn	83	US	Actress, Singer	Three Days of the Condor; The Trip to Bountiful	
July	13	Edward Hume	87	US	Screenwriter	A Reflection of Fear; Two-Minute Warning	
July	14	Nick Benedict	77	US	Actor	The Naked Cage; The Pistol: The Birth of a Legend	
July	15	Leonard Retel Helmrich	63	Netherlands	Director, Cinematographer	Shape of the Moon; Position Among the Stars	
July	16	Jane Birkin	76	UK	Singer, Actress	La Piscine; Death on the Nile	
July	16	Ricky Rivero	51	Philippines	Actor, Assistant Director	This Guy's in Love with U Mare!; The Gifted	
July	17	Linda Haynes	75	US	Actress	Rolling Thunder; Brubaker	
July	19	Andrea Purgatori	70	Italy	Screenwriter	The Rubber Wall; Cha cha cha	
July	19	Mark Thomas	67	UK	Composer	Twin Town; Dog Soldiers	
July	20	Romain Winding	71	France	Cinematographer	Farewell, My Queen; La Famille Bélier	
July	21	Juliette Mayniel	87	France	Actress	Les Cousins; Eyes Without a Face	
July	22	Lelia Goldoni	86	US	Actress	Shadows; Alice Doesn't Live Here Anymore	
July	23	Pamela Blair	73	US	Actress, Singer	Annie; Mighty Aphrodite	
July	23	Inga Swenson	90	US	Actress, Singer	The Miracle Worker; Advise & Consent	
July	25	Julian Barry	92	US	Screenwriter	Lenny; The River	
July	25	Bo Goldman	90	US	Screenwriter	One Flew Over the Cuckoo's Nest; Meet Joe Black	
July	26	Sinéad O'Connor	56	Ireland	Actress, Singer	Wuthering Heights; The Butcher Boy	
July	27	Pierre Collin	85	Canada	Actor	Maelström; Seducing Doctor Lewis	
July	29	Marc Gilpin	56	US	Actor	Jaws 2; The Legend of the Lone Ranger	
July	30	Paul Reubens	70	US	Actor, Screenwriter, Comedian	Pee-wee's Big Adventure; Blow	
July	31	Angus Cloud	25	US	Actor	North Hollywood; The Line	
July	31	Inga Landgré	95	Sweden	Actress	The Seventh Seal; The Girl with the Dragon Tattoo	
August	1	Alexander Kolker	90	Russia	Composer	Private Life of Kuzyayev Valentin; Tomorrow, on April 3rd...	
August	2	Nitin Chandrakant Desai	57	India	Art Director, Production Designer	Lagaan; Swades	
August	2	Tom Kempinski	85	UK	Actor	The Damned; The McKenzie Break	
August	3	Carl Davis	86	US	Composer	The French Lieutenant's Woman; Scandal	
August	3	Mark Margolis	83	US	Actor	Scarface; Requiem for a Dream	
August	3	Irina Miroshnichenko	81	Russia	Actress	Walking the Streets of Moscow; Andrei Rublev	
August	4	Luis Alarcón	93	Chile	Actor	Three Sad Tigers; Jackal of Nahueltoro	
August	5	Arthur Schmidt	86	US	Film Editor	Back to the Future; Forrest Gump	
August	7	William Friedkin	87	US	Director, Screenwriter	The Exorcist; The French Connection	
August	7	Margit Saad	94	Germany	Actress	The Criminal; The Rebel	
August	8	Yuliya Borisova	98	Russia	Actress	The Idiot; The Ambassador of the Soviet Union	
August	8	Dušan Kaprálik	75	Slovakia	Actor	The Teacher; Old-Timers	
August	8	Vera Vasilyeva	97	Russia	Actress	Adventures of a Dentist; Carnival	
August	9	Doreen Mantle	97	UK	Actress	Yentl; Scoop	
August	9	Robbie Robertson	80	Canada	Composer	The Color of Money; Killers of the Flower Moon	
August	9	Robert Swan	78	US	Actor	Hoosiers; The Untouchables	
August	10	Robert Arevalo	85	Philippines	Actor	The Healing; The Siege of Firebase Gloria	
August	10	Antonella Lualdi	92	Italy	Actress, Singer	Chronicle of Poor Lovers; Silver Spoon Set	
August	10	Stan Waterman	100	US	Cinematographer, Producer	Blue Water, White Death; The Deep	
August	11	Darren Kent	36	UK	Actor, Director	Mirrors; Dungeons & Dragons: Honor Among Thieves	
August	13	Clarence Avant	92	US	Producer	Save the Children; Jason's Lyric	
August	13	Patricia Bredin	88	UK	Actress	The Bridal Path; Left Right and Centre	
August	14	Matyelok Gibbs	91	UK	Actress	Ever After; Babel	
August	15	Léa Garcia	90	Brazil	Actress	Black Orpheus; The Greatest Love of All	
August	17	Angie Ferro	86	Philippines	Actress	Ang Mga Kaibigan ni Mama Susan; Lola Igna	
August	17	Rose Gregorio	97	US	Actress	The Swimmer; Good Time	
August	17	David Ostrosky	66	Mexico	Actor	Like Water for Chocolate; The House of Flowers: The Movie	
August	18	Sarah Lawson	95	UK	Actress	The Devil Rides Out; Battle of Britain	
August	19	Ron Cephas Jones	66	US	Actor	Dolemite Is My Name; Half Nelson	
August	19	Nizo Yamamoto	70	Japan	Art Director	Castle in the Sky; Grave of the Fireflies	
August	19	Igor Yasulovich	81	Russia	Actor	The Diamond Arm; The Twelve Chairs	
August	21	Elizabeth Hoffman	97	US	Actress	Fear No Evil; Dante's Peak	
August	22	Ebrahim Golestan	100	Iran	Director	Brick and Mirror; The Ghost Valley's Treasure Mysteries	
August	23	Terry Funk	79	US	Actor	Over the Top; Road House	
August	23	Hersha Parady	78	US	Actress	Hyper Sapien: People from Another Star; The Break	
August	24	Seema Deo	81	India	Actress	Anand; Koshish	
August	24	Arleen Sorkin	67	US	Actress	Oscar; Ted & Venus	
August	26	Gleb Panfilov	89	Russia	Director, Screenwriter	The Beginning; The Theme	
August	27	Franne Lee	81	US	Costume Designer	Baby It's You; Chinese Coffee	
August	29	Nancy Buirski	78	US	Director, Producer	Loving; A Crime on the Bayou	
August	29	Jamie Christopher	52	UK	Assistant Director, Producer	Harry Potter; Guardians of the Galaxy	
August	29	Robert Klane	81	US	Screenwriter	National Lampoon's European Vacation; Weekend at Bernie's	
August	31	Gayle Hunnicutt	80	US	Actress	The Legend of Hell House; Scorpio	
September	1	Jimmy Buffett	76	US	Singer, Actor	Repo Man; Hoot	
September	2	Marcia de Rousse	70	US	Actress	Tiptoes; The Disappointments Room	
September	2	Shannon Wilcox	80	US	Actress	The Border; Frankie and Johnny	
September	4	Gary Wright	80	US	Composer	Endangered Species; Fire and Ice	
September	6	John Cairney	93	UK	Actor	A Night to Remember; Cleopatra	
September	6	Giuliano Montaldo	93	Italy	Director, Screenwriter, Actor	Sacco & Vanzetti; Machine Gun McCain	
September	12	Jean Boht	91	UK	Actress	Distant Voices, Still Lives; The Girl in a Swing	
September	12	Román Chalbaud	91	Venezuela	Director, Screenwriter	Adolescence of Cain; El Pez que Fuma	
September	13	Pepe Soriano	93	Argentina	Actor	Rebellion in Patagonia; The Dumbfounded King	
September	14	Michael McGrath	65	US	Actor	Changing Lanes; The Secret of Kells	
September	15	Christopher Miles	84	UK	Director, Screenwriter, Producer	The Maids; Priest of Love	
September	18	Byun Hee-bong	81	South Korea	Actor	Memories of Murder; The Host	
September	19	Hildegarde Neil	84	UK	Actress	The Man Who Haunted Himself; A Touch of Class	
September	20	Elaine Devry	93	US	Actress	The Atomic Kid; A Guide for the Married Man	
September	24	Keith Baxter	90	UK	Actor	Chimes at Midnight; Ash Wednesday	
September	24	K. G. George	77	India	Director, Screenwriter	Yavanika; Panchavadi Palam	
September	25	David McCallum	90	UK	Actor	A Night to Remember; The Great Escape	
September	26	Sandra Dorsey	83	US	Actress	Sleepaway Camp III: Teenage Wasteland; Norma Rae	
September	27	Michael Gambon	82	Ireland	Actor	Harry Potter; Sleepy Hollow	
September	30	Thomas Danneberg	81	Germany	Actor, Dubber	Code Name: Wild Geese; Commando Leopard	
September	30	Vitali Konyayev	86	Russia	Actor	Clear Skies; The Red and the White	
October	4	Shawna Trpcic	56	US	Costume Designer	The Cabin in the Woods; Much Ado About Nothing	
October	5	Dick Butkus	80	US	Actor	Mother, Jugs & Speed; Johnny Dangerously	
October	6	Mary Chronopoulou	90	Greece	Actress	The Red Lanterns; Voyage to Cythera	
October	6	Vincent Patrick	88	US	Screenwriter	The Pope of Greenwich Village; The Devil's Own	
October	6	Atila Pesyani	66	Iran	Actor	Cease Fire; The Warden	
October	7	Terence Davies	77	UK	Director, Screenwriter	The Long Day Closes; The Deep Blue Sea	
October	8	Burt Young	83	US	Actor	Rocky; Once Upon a Time in America	
October	9	Mikhail Golubovich	79	Ukraine	Actor	The Lost Letter; Lone Wolf	
October	9	Anthony Hickox	64	UK	Director, Screenwriter, Actor	Waxwork; Hellraiser III: Hell on Earth	
October	9	Lars Lunøe	87	Denmark	Actor	Doctor Glas; Terribly Happy	
October	9	Yulian Panich	92	Russia	Actor	Road to Life; Brass Target	
October	9	Henri Serre	92	France	Actor	Jules and Jim; The Fire Within	
October	10	Jeff Burr	60	US	Director, Actor	Stepfather II; Leatherface: The Texas Chainsaw Massacre III	
October	10	Shirley Jo Finney	74	US	Actress	Echo Park; Moving	
October	10	Mark Goddard	87	US	Actor	Blue Sunshine; Roller Boogie	
October	11	Phyllis Coates	96	US	Actress	Superman and the Mole Men; The Incredible Petrified World	
October	12	Lara Parker	84	US	Actress	Save the Tiger; Race with the Devil	
October	14	Piper Laurie	91	US	Actress	The Hustler; Children of a Lesser God	
October	14	Dariush Mehrjui	83	Iran	Director, Screenwriter, Producer	The Cow; Santouri	
October	15	Joanna Merlin	92	US	Actress, Casting Director	Fame; Big Trouble in Little China	
October	15	Jean-Roger Milo	66	France	Actor	Germinal; Asterix and Obelix vs. Caesar	
October	15	Suzanne Somers	76	US	Actress	American Graffiti; Yesterday's Hero	
October	16	Gennady Gladkov	88	Russia	Composer	Gentlemen of Fortune; To Kill a Dragon	
October	16	Jesús Guzmán	97	Spain	Actor	For a Few Dollars More; The Great Vazquez	
October	16	Steven Weisberg	68	US	Film Editor	The Cable Guy; Harry Potter and the Prisoner of Azkaban	
October	18	Osvaldo Desideri	84	Italy	Set Decorator	The Last Emperor; Once Upon a Time in America	
October	20	Leslie Dayman	85	Australia	Actor	Gallipoli; Holy Smoke!	
October	20	Haydn Gwynne	66	UK	Actress	Hunky Dory; Beauty and the Beast	
October	21	Joan Evans	89	US	Actress	Edge of Doom; On the Loose	
October	21	Stephen Kandel	96	US	Screenwriter	Battle of the Coral Sea; Chamber of Horrors	
October	21	Marzia Ubaldi	85	Italy	Actress	Euphoria; The Predators	
October	22	Dave Courtney	64	UK	Actor	The Krays; The Dead Sleep Easy	
October	23	Bill Kenwright	78	UK	Actor, Producer	Die, Mommie, Die!; The Boys from County Clare	
October	24	Richard Roundtree	81	US	Actor	Shaft; Seven	
October	26	Richard Moll	80	US	Actor	The Sword and the Sorcerer; House	
October	26	Judy Nugent	83	US	Actress	Magnificent Obsession; There's Always Tomorrow	
October	27	Hiroshi Inuzuka	94	Japan	Actor, Comedian	Samurai Reincarnation; Giovanni's Island	
October	28	Matthew Perry	54	US	Actor	Fools Rush In; The Whole Nine Yards	
October	29	Joey Paras	45	Philippines	Actor, Director	Bekikang: Ang Nanay Kong Beki; Ayuda Babes	
October	31	Tyler Christopher	50	US	Actor	Catfish in Black Bean Sauce; Shouting Secrets	
October	31	Elmar Wepper	79	Germany	Actor	Lammbock; Cherry Blossoms	
November	– (Note: It is unknown what day he died on in November.)	Buddy Duress	38	US	Actor	Heaven Knows What; Good Time	
November	1	Grégoire Lassalle	68	France	Producer	Crash Test Aglaé; The Extraordinary Journey of the Fakir	
November	1	Peter White	86	US	Actor	Armageddon; Thirteen Days	
November	2	Wei Wei	101	China	Actress	Spring in a Small Town; The Truth About Jane and Sam	
November	3	Robert Butler	95	US	Director	The Computer Wore Tennis Shoes; Turbulence	
November	4	Marina Cicogna	89	Italy	Producer	Investigation of a Citizen Above Suspicion; A Brief Vacation	
November	4 (Note: The day he went missing. It is unknown if he died on that day.)	Ross McDonnell	44	Ireland	Director, Cinematographer	Elián; The First Wave	
November	5	Evan Ellingson	35	US	Actor	My Sister's Keeper; Letters from Iwo Jima	
November	5	Pat E. Johnson	84	US	Stuntman, Actor, Choreographer	The Karate Kid; Enter the Dragon	
November	5	Donald Shebib	85	Canada	Director, Screenwriter, Film Editor	Goin' Down the Road; Running Brave	
November	6	Janet Landgard	75	US	Actress	The Swimmer; Land Raiders	
November	8	Hannelore Auer	81	Austria	Actress, Singer	Schweik's Awkward Years; Come to the Blue Adriatic	
November	8	Roger Kastel	92	US	Poster Artist	Jaws; The Empire Strikes Back	
November	9	Jørgen Reenberg	96	Denmark	Actor	Europa; I Am Dina	
November	9	Tim Woodward	70	UK	Actor	The Europeans; K-19: The Widowmaker	
November	10	John Bailey	81	US	Cinematographer, Director	Ordinary People; The Big Chill	
November	10	Spiros Focás	86	Greece	Actor	Rocco and His Brothers; Rambo III	
November	11	Chandra Mohan	78	India	Actor	Padaharella Vayasu; 7G Brindavan Colony	
November	11	Conny Van Dyke	78	US	Actress, Singer	W.W. and the Dixie Dancekings; Framed	
November	12	Kevin Turen	44	US	Producer	X; The Unbearable Weight of Massive Talent	
November	15	Žarko Laušević	63	Montenegro	Actor	The Black Bomber; The Dagger	
November	17	Suzanne Shepherd	89	US	Actress	Goodfellas; Requiem for a Dream	
November	19	Joss Ackland	95	UK	Actor	White Mischief; Lethal Weapon 2	
November	19	Sanjay Gadhvi	57	India	Director, Screenwriter	Dhoom; Kidnap	
November	19	Anna Kanakis	61	Italy	Actress	Attila flagello di Dio; 2019, After the Fall of New York	
November	19	Peter Spellos	69	US	Actor	Bound; Men in Black II	
November	20	Zdena Hadrbolcová	86	Czech Republic	Actress	The Snowdrop Festival; The Idiot Returns	
November	22	François Musy	68	Switzerland	Sound Engineer	First Name: Carmen; Lost Illusions	
November	23	Rona Hartner	50	Romania	Actress, Singer	The Crazy Stranger; Time of the Wolf	
November	24	Elliot Silverstein	96	US	Director	Cat Ballou; A Man Called Horse	
November	24	Heidelinde Weis	83	Austria	Actress	I'm Marrying the Director; Dead Woman from Beverly Hills	
November	25	Bita Farrahi	65	Iran	Actress	Hamoun; My Brother Khosrow	
November	25	Marty Krofft	86	Canada	Producer	Pufnstuf; Land of the Lost	
November	25	Aldo Lado	88	Italy	Director, Screenwriter	Short Night of Glass Dolls; Who Saw Her Die?	
November	27	Victor J. Kemper	96	US	Cinematographer	Dog Day Afternoon; National Lampoon's Vacation	
November	27	Frances Sternhagen	93	US	Actress	Outland; Misery	
December	1	Burny Bos	79	Netherlands	Producer, Screenwriter	The Flying Liftboy; Miss Minoes	
December	1	Brigit Forsyth	83	UK	Actress	The Night Digger; The Likely Lads	
December	1	Charles Officer	48	Canada	Director, Screenwriter, Actor	Nurse.Fighter.Boy; Akilla's Escape	
December	2	Concha Velasco	84	Spain	Actress, Singer	Red Cross Girls; Esquilache	
December	3	Kim Soo-yong	94	South Korea	Director	The Sea Village; Mist	
December	4	Peter R. Adam	66	Germany	Film Editor	Good Bye, Lenin!; Anonymous	
December	4	Queta Lavat	94	Mexico	Actress	Santa Claus; Dos tipos de cuidado	
December	5	Norman Lear	101	US	Director, Producer, Screenwriter	Come Blow Your Horn; Divorce American Style	
December	6	Emmanuelle Debever	60	France	Actress	Danton; Sweet Inquest on Violence	
December	6	Jack Hogan	94	US	Actor	The Bonnie Parker Story; The Legend of Tom Dooley	
December	6	Ellen Holly	92	US	Actress	Cops and Robbers; School Daze	
December	6	Marisa Pavan	91	Italy	Actress	The Rose Tattoo; Solomon and Sheba	
December	7	Stan Rogow	75	US	Producer	The Clan of the Cave Bear; The Lizzie McGuire Movie	
December	8	Itziar Castro	46	Spain	Actress	Skins; Champions	
December	8	Leelavathi	86	India	Actress	Mana Mecchida Madadi; Bhakta Kumbara	
December	8	Ryan O'Neal	82	US	Actor	Love Story; Barry Lyndon	
December	8	Yayu Unru	61	Indonesia	Actor	Lovely Man; Marlina the Murderer in Four Acts	
December	10	Michael Blakemore	95	Australia	Actor, Director, Screenwriter	Privates on Parade; Country Life	
December	10	Mort Engelberg	86	US	Producer	Smokey and the Bandit; The Big Easy	
December	10	Shirley Anne Field	87	UK	Actress	Peeping Tom; My Beautiful Laundrette	
December	11	Shūji Abe	74	Japan	Producer	Love Letter; Godzilla Minus One	
December	11	Andre Braugher	61	US	Actor	Glory; Primal Fear	
December	11	Alain Chartrand	77	Canada	Director, Screenwriter	My Life Is a River; Good Riddance	
December	11	Kathy Chow	57	Hong Kong	Actress	The Private Eye Blues; Don't Give a Damn	
December	11	Ken Kelsch	76	US	Cinematographer	The Driller Killer; Bad Lieutenant	
December	11	Camden Toy	68	US	Actor, Film Editor	ChromeSkull: Laid to Rest 2; Bedeviled	
December	13	Wolfgang Glück	94	Austria	Director, Screenwriter, Actor	'38 – Vienna Before the Fall; Funny Games	
December	13	Zofia Merle	85	Poland	Actress	Teddy Bear; Nights and Days	
December	14	Selma Archerd	98	US	Actress	Mommie Dearest; Lethal Weapon	
December	15	Guy Marchand	86	France	Actor, Singer	Coup de Torchon; Deadly Circuit	
December	16	Jayanta Das	54	India	Actor, Director	Gattu; Madras Cafe	
December	16	Sebastiano Lo Monaco	65	Italy	Actor	Graduation Party; I Viceré	
December	16	Kenpachiro Satsuma	76	Japan	Actor	Godzilla; G.I. Samurai	
December	17	Norma Barzman	103	US	Screenwriter	Never Say Goodbye; Finishing School	
December	17	Linda van Dyck	75	Netherlands	Actress	Ciske de Rat; Daens	
December	17	Otar Iosseliani	89	Georgia	Director, Screenwriter, Film Editor	Monday Morning; Brigands	
December	17	James McCaffrey	65	US	Actor	American Splendor; Compliance	
December	17	Ronaldo Valdez	76	Philippines	Actor	Mang Jose; Seven Sundays	
December	18	Dan Greenburg	87	US	Screenwriter	Live a Little, Love a Little; The Guardian	
December	21	Carmen Barros	98	Chile	Actress, Singer	La Fiebre del Loco; The Guest	
December	22	Sajid Khan	71	India	Actor, Singer	Maya; Heat and Dust	
December	22	Ingrid Steeger	76	Germany	Actress, Comedian	Nurse Report; Three Men in the Snow	
December	23	Lynn Loring	80	US	Actress, Producer	Splendor in the Grass; Mr. Mom	
December	23	Bonda Mani	60	India	Actor, Comedian	Winner; Englishkaran	
December	23	Mike Nussbaum	99	US	Actor	Fatal Attraction; Men in Black	
December	23	Richard Romanus	80	US	Actor	Mean Streets; Wizards	
December	24	Kamar de los Reyes	56	Puerto Rico	Actor	The Cell; Salt	
December	24	David Leland	82	UK	Actor, Director, Screenwriter	Wish You Were Here; The Big Man	
December	25	Richard Franklin	87	UK	Actor	Chemical Wedding; Rogue One	
December	25	Tom Priestley	91	UK	Film Editor, Sound Editor	Deliverance; Nineteen Eighty-Four	
December	26	David Kernan	85	UK	Actor, Singer	Zulu; Carry On Abroad	
December	26	Elsa Lystad	93	Norway	Actress	Hurra for Andersens!; Sweetwater	
December	26	Tom Smothers	86	US	Actor, Comedian	Get to Know Your Rabbit; Serial	
December	27	Yuri Arabov	69	Russia	Screenwriter	Mother and Son; Faust	
December	27	Patricia Ferreira	65	Spain	Director, Screenwriter	I Know Who You Are; The Impatient Alchemist	
December	27	Mbongeni Ngema	68	South Africa	Actor, Screenwriter, Musician	Sarafina!; The Lion King	
December	27	Lee Sun-kyun	48	South Korea	Actor	A Hard Day; Parasite	
December	28	Per Myrberg	90	Sweden	Actor, Singer	The Simple-Minded Murderer; The Girl with the Dragon Tattoo	
December	28	Herman Raucher	95	US	Screenwriter	Summer of '42; Class of '44	
December	28	Vijayakanth	71	India	Actor	Pulan Visaranai; Captain Prabhakaran	
December	29	Sandra Reaves-Phillips	79	US	Actress, Singer	Round Midnight; Lean on Me	
December	30 (Note: The day she was found dead. She was last seen alive on 19 December 2023.)	Cindy Morgan	69	US	Actress	Caddyshack; Tron	
December	30	John Pilger	84	Australia	Documentarian	The War on Democracy; The War You Don't See	
December	30	Tom Wilkinson	75	UK	Actor	The Full Monty; In the Bedroom	
December	31	Shecky Greene	97	US	Actor, Comedian	Splash; History of the World, Part I	
December	31	Maunu Kurkvaara	97	Finland	Director, Screenwriter, Producer	4x4; Let Not One Devil Cross the Bridge	
December	31	Ana Ofelia Murguía	90	Mexico	Actress	The Queen of the Night; Coco	

== Film debuts ==
- Ansonbean – Tales from the Occult：Body and Soul
- Sasha Calle – The Flash
- David Jonsson – Rye Lane
- MrBeast – Teenage Mutant Ninja Turtles: Mutant Mayhem
- Sofía Otero – 20,000 Species of Bees
- Dominic Sessa – The Holdovers
