= Romain Puertolas =

French writer

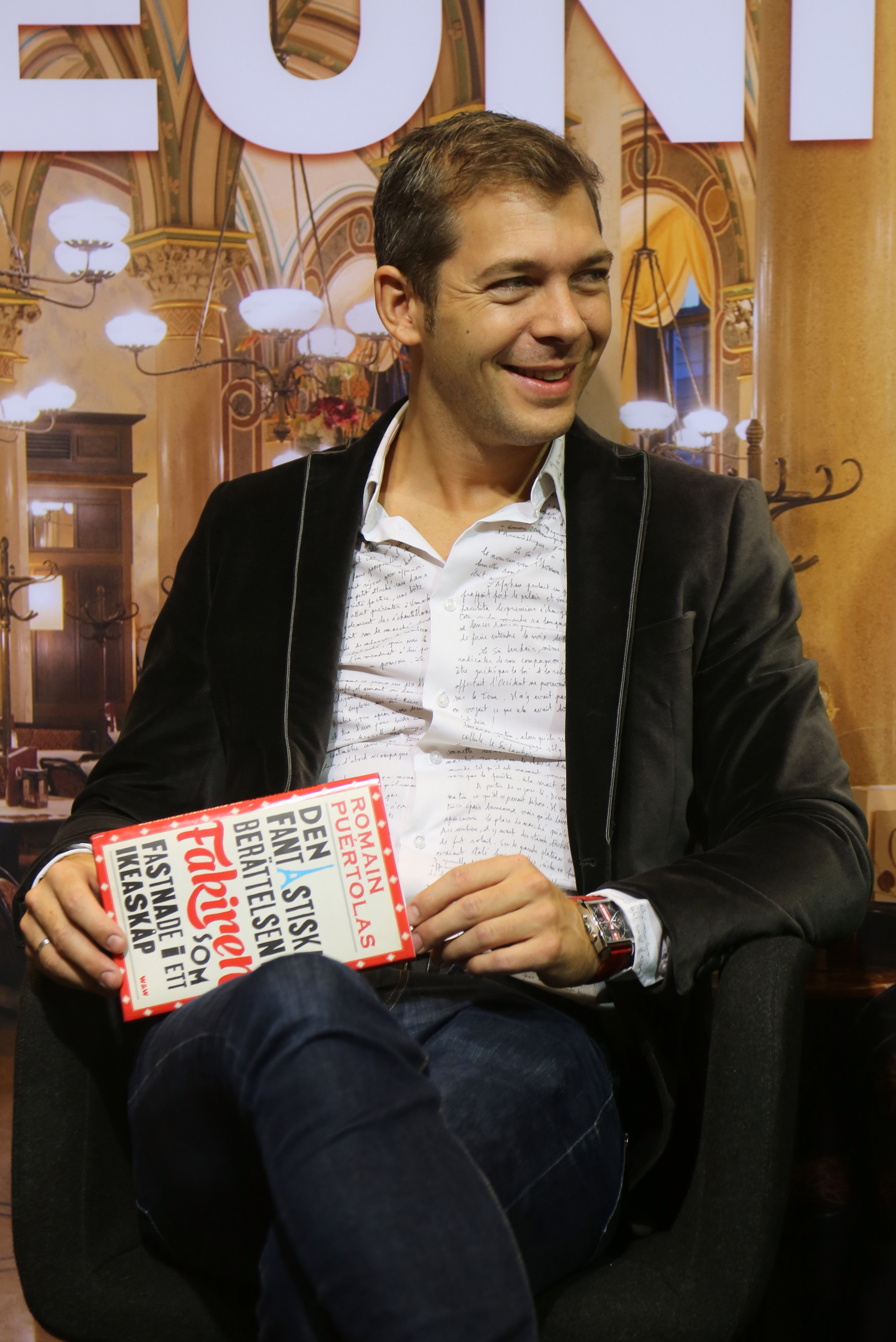
Romain Puértolas at the Gothenburg Book Fair 2014

Romain Puértolas (born 1975) is a French author. He is most noted for the bestselling French novel The Extraordinary Journey of the Fakir Who Got Trapped in an Ikea Wardrobe, which has been translated into English and has become an international bestseller sold in 36 nations. This novel sold over 100,000 copies in France by August 2014 and topped French bestseller lists.

== Biography ==
Romain Puertolas was born on December 21, 1975, in Montpellier in southern France. He is the only child of a Spanish Army colonel (his father) and a French army administrator (his mother). He was an airport controller in Madrid, Spain. Puertolas became a police officer and border guard in France at age 33. As a police officer he specialized in examining document fraud in illegal immigration networks in France. After the success of his first novel, he quit this police job in December 2014 to work on writing further novels.

In 2008, Puertolas created a series of videos aiming to "debunking magicians, illusionists and fakirs", posted to various online websites, including YouTube, Dailymotion and others. One of the many illusionists whose tricks were reportedly "debunked", stage magician David Copperfield, disliked these videos and caused Puertolas' YouTube account to be closed. These approximately 60 "Trickbusters Show" videos were produced by "Grand" Puertolas in collaboration with a Spanish engineer friend "Skeptic Munoz".

In 2010, Puértolas married Patricia Sierra Gutierrez, a Spanish pediatrician from Andalusia. They have two children.

== Career ==
The Extraordinary Journey of the Fakir Who Got Trapped in an Ikea Wardrobe is Romain Puertolas' debut novel, published in French as L' extraordinaire voyage du fakir qui était resté coincé dans une armoire Ikéa on August 21, 2013, by Le Dilletante of Paris, France (ISBN 978-2842637767), and published in English (translated by Sam Taylor) on August 5, 2014, by Harvill Secker (hardcover, ISBN 978-1846558405) and by Random House Canada (paperback, ISBN 978-0345814173) . In January 2015, this novel became available in the United States, published in English by Alfred A. Knopf of New York City (hardcover, ISBN 978-0385352956).

This novel tells the story of Ajatashatru Oghash Rathod, a 38-year-old fakir who tricks his local village in Rajasthan, India into believing he possesses special powers and into paying him to fly to Paris to buy a bed of nails from an IKEA store. There he meets a woman named Marie Riviere whom he initially swindles, but is quickly attracted to her personality. Rathod then experiences a series of wide-ranging adventures around the world, initially in an IKEA wardrobe, then a Louis Vuitton suitcase, and a hot air balloon to Tripoli, Libya, while being pursued by Parisian taxi-driver Gustave Palourde whom he swindled out of a cabfare back in Paris and who wants to stab him. Along the way he befriends a Sudanese man named Assefa, “pronounced I-suffer”, an illegal immigrant whom he meets in a vegetable lorry. The tone of this novel is comedic and humorous.

Puertolas wrote this novel during a period of approximately one month during 2013. He told The Daily Telegraph "I wanted to write a book about the problems of immigrants and how unlucky people are to be born somewhere like the Sudan where they are not allowed to go anywhere, even as a tourist, which is why I made Assefa and Ajatashatru meet."

This novel has sold over 100,000 copies in France. Foreign rights to this book have been sold in 30 countries, a record for its publisher, Le Dilettante.

On June 12, 2014, Puertolas received Le Grand Prix Jules-Verne for 2014 from the l'Académie littéraire de Bretagne et des Pays de la Loire, for writing this novel. The novel was also a finalist for the 2013 Prix Renaudot literary award. The English translation of this book has received numerous positive reviews, including from The Guardian, The Telegraph, the Toronto Star, and The Irish Times. This novel is dedicated to Puertolas's two children Leo and Eva, and his wife Patricia.

The film rights for this novel have been purchased, and work began on an English-language movie adaptation of this novel, with Puertolas contributing a script as the screenwriter. Brio Films and Vamonos Films are producers of the film, titled The Extraordinary Journey Of The Fakir. The film has Dhanush, a prominent actor from India, in the title role alongside actresses Bérénice Bejo and Erin Moriarty. The movie is directed by Ken Scott and was released on May 30, 2018.

The Little Girl Who Swallowed A Cloud As Big As The Eiffel Tower was Puertolas' second novel, entitled La petite fille qui avait avalé un nuage grand comme la tour Eiffel (The Little Girl Who Swallowed A Cloud As Big As The Eiffel Tower). Puertolas states that his second novel (The Little Girl) was written in two and a half weeks. It has been submitted to Le Dilletante and who published it in French on January 7, 2015. Claude Tarrene, an executive at Le Dilletante, stated that his company has sold foreign rights to this second novel in a dozen countries.

== Future works ==
Puertolas states that he writes novels during a relatively short time frame and that he is currently working on "five" new novels. One of the novels he is presently working on will be set partially in New York City.

== See also ==
- The Extraordinary Journey Of The Fakir
