= List of Yemeni films =

This is a list of Yemeni films:

== 0-9 ==
- 10 Days Before the Wedding (2018)

== B ==
- Birth of Hope (2023)
- The Burdened (2023)

== D ==
- Don't Give Up (2023)

== F ==
- Flower (2023)

== I ==
- I Am Nojoom, Age 10 and Divorced (2014)

== K ==
- Karama Has No Walls (2012)

== L ==
- A Lifetime of Music (2023)
- The Losing Bet (2008)

== M ==
- Mag Mell (2014)
- Made of Gold (2023)
- Melody of Displacement (2023)
- The Mulberry House (2013)

== N ==
- A New Day in Old Sana'a (2005)
- The Nightmare (2023)

== O ==
- Old Sana'a (2023)
- Ozazah (2023)

== P ==
- Pottery (2023)

== R ==
- Red Chair (2023)
- The Return (2023)
- Road of Doom (2023)
- Roots (2023)

== S ==
- Socotra: He'r wa Imshin (2014)
- Socotra: The Hidden Land (2015)
- Stray Flowers (2023)

== W ==
- When I Grow Up (2023)

== Y ==
- Yemen: The Silent War (2018)
- Yemeniettes (2014)
