= Grégoire Lassalle =

French entertainer and businessman (1955–2023)

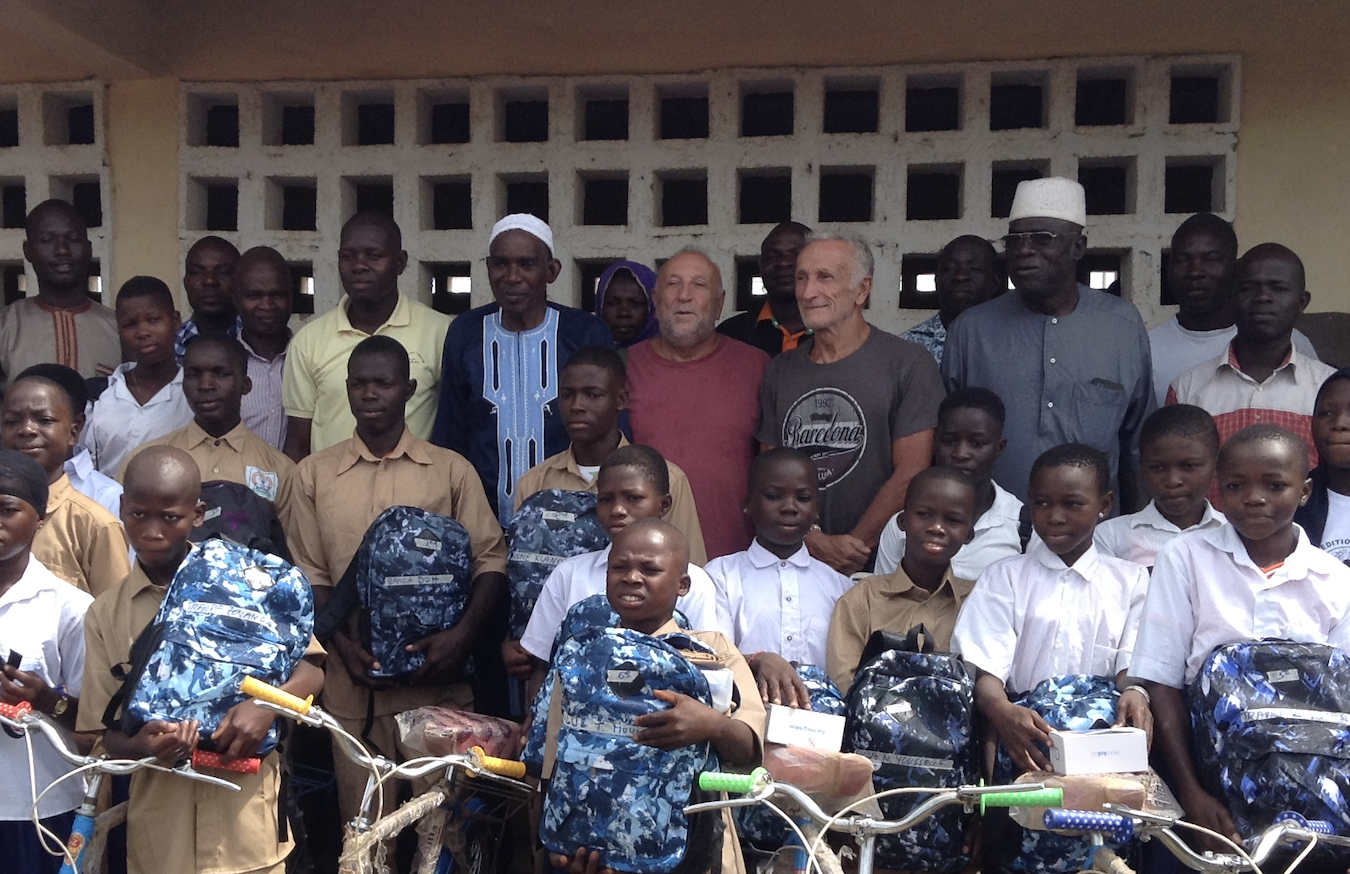
Grégoire Lassalle (center) surrounded by beneficiaries of his Cornelius Endowment's grant in Boyo, Ivory Coast, September 2022

Grégoire Lassalle (20 March 1955 – 1 November 2023) was a French entertainer, businessman, film producer, and philanthropist.

== Early life and career ==
Born in Cannes, Lassalle trained as a circus entertainer under Annie Fratellini, and performed for seven years as a clown in the late 1970s and early 1980s, under the stage name Cornelius. He also worked with entertainers Farid Chopel and Ged Marlon.

In the 1980s Lassalle worked odd jobs, including as a tennis coach, lifeguard, radio host on Europe 1, events organizer, and resort manager for Club Med. He subsequently worked in the film industry, including as a direction assistant to Claude Berri. In 1991, while working for a landscape design firm, he met Jérôme Seydoux, CEO of Pathé, and subsequently worked with him at Pathé in marketing roles from 1992 to 1998.

== AlloCiné ==
Lassalle created his own film promotion company, and in 1998 sold it to AlloCiné, a French start-up company that had been founded in 1993 and initially offered information services about cinema in France; Lassalle then became an employee of AlloCiné. AlloCiné was purchased by Canal+ in 2000 and taken over by its parent Vivendi in 2002, but the latter was experiencing financial and operational stress and soon decided to either divest or close AlloCiné. Together with fellow manager Bertrand Stéphann, Lassalle rescued the company from the risk of termination by partnering with venture capital firm Cita Gestion through a management buyout in 2003. AlloCiné then expanded rapidly and highly successfully, and became the world's second-largest cinema-themed website by audience, behind IMDb. In 2007, majority control of AlloCiné was acquired by Tiger Global Management for 120 million euro, of which a significant share went to Lassalle. In 2010, Lassalle took over the role of CEO, succeeding Claude Esclatine with whom he had worked as an entertainer in the late 1980s.

== Film production ==
Lassalle relinquished the position of AlloCiné chief executive in 2013 but kept a leadership role in the company's filmmaking arm, Allociné Productions, which he had initiated in 2011. His filmography includes Chronic (2015, Best Screenplay Award at the Festival de Cannes), Blind Date (2015), Crash Test Aglaé (2017), and The Extraordinary Journey of the Fakir (2018).

== Philanthropy ==
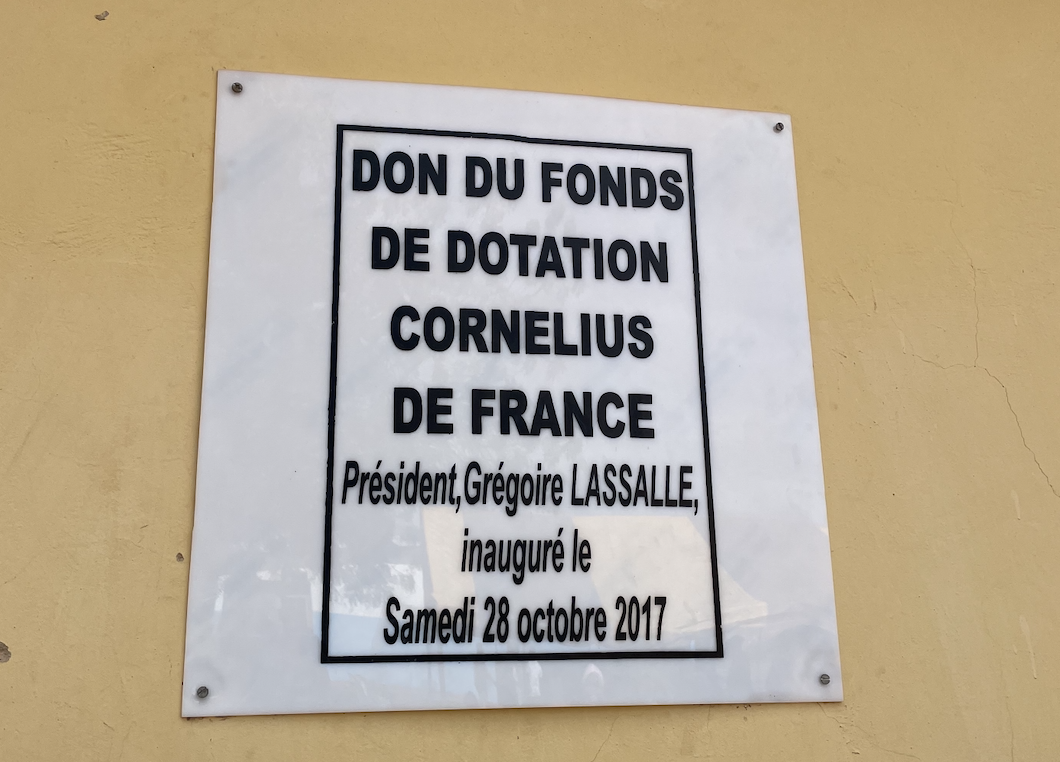
Commemorative plaque of a Cornelius Endowment grant in Boyo, Ivory Coast

In April 2017, Lassalle created the Cornelius Endowment (French: Fonds de Dotation Cornélius), a nonprofit mainly dedicated to projects in Sub-Saharan Africa. The Cornelius Endowment funds education and health projects in Ivory Coast, in the villages of Boyo and Tiogo in the northern Savanes District.

Grégoire Lassalle also invested as a business angel and in venture capital, including as a limited partner of several funds of VC firm Newfund and a member of their respective consultative committees.

== Personal life and death ==
Lassalle had two children with his wife, Gaëlle. He died on 1 November 2023, at the age of 68.

== See also ==
- Cinema of France
- Education in Africa
