= The Extraordinary Journey of the Fakir =

2018 film by Ken Scott

- Theatrical release poster
- Directed by: Ken Scott
- Written by: Romain Puertolas; Luc Bossi; Ken Scott
- Based on: The Extraordinary Journey of the Fakir Who Got Trapped in an Ikea Wardrobe by Romain Puertolas
- Produced by: Luc Bossi; Jon Goldman; Saurabh Gupta; Aditi Anand; Gulzar Chahal; Grégoire Lassalle; Genevieve Lemal; Jaime Mateus-Tique
- Starring: Dhanush; Bérénice Bejo; Erin Moriarty; Barkhad Abdi; Gérard Jugnot; Ben Miller
- Cinematography: Vincent Mathias AFC
- Edited by: Yvann Thibaudeau
- Music by: Nicolas Errèra; Amit Trivedi
- Production companies: Brio Films; Vamonos Films; Scope Pictures; Little Red Car Films; TF1 Studio; Sony Pictures Entertainment France; Aleph Motion Pictures; M! Capital Ventures; Impact Films; RTBF; Digital District; Cactus World Films
- Distributed by: Sony Pictures Releasing (France); AA Films (India); Scope Pictures (Belgium)
- Release dates: 30 May 2018 (France and Belgium); 21 June 2019 (India)
- Running time: 92 minutes
- Countries: France; India; Belgium
- Language: English
- Budget: $20 million
- Box office: $3.26 million

The Extraordinary Journey of the Fakir is a 2018 adventure comedy film directed by Ken Scott and written by Scott, Romain Puertolas, and Luc Bossi. It is based on the French novel The Extraordinary Journey of the Fakir Who Got Trapped in an Ikea Wardrobe by Puertolas. The film stars Dhanush in the lead role, with Bérénice Bejo, Erin Moriarty, Barkhad Abdi, Gérard Jugnot, and Ben Miller as the supporting cast. The premise follows a street magician from Mumbai who embarks on a global journey to find his father. The film was shot in India, Belgium, France and Italy. This film marked Dhanush's international debut.

The film released in France on 30 May 2018 and in India, USA, Canada, Singapore and Malaysia on 21 June 2019. Alongside the English original version, a subtitled French version and a Tamil dubbed version was released owing to the popularity of Dhanush.

== Plot ==
Ajatashatru "Aja" Lavash Patel, who has lived all his life in a small Mumbai neighborhood, is a street magician and trickster who tricks people into believing that he possesses special magic powers. He narrates his story to three kids caught by police and are now going for a four year judicial custody.

After his mother's untimely death, he sets off on a journey to find his estranged father in Paris with a fake EUR 100 note. There, he meets a woman named Marie Riviere in a furniture store whom he initially swindles, but is quickly attracted to her personality. Aja then experiences a series of wide-ranging adventures around the world, initially in an IKEA wardrobe to London, England, then a Louis Vuitton suitcase to Rome, Italy, and a hot air balloon to a ship heading to Tripoli, Libya. In the ship, he gets robbed the money he earned by selling the shirt on which he wrote an emotional incident from his childhood. In Libya, he meets a Somali man named Wiraj, an illegal immigrant whom he met on the way to London. Together with Wiraj and group of other friends he gets back the money. In the refugee camp where Wiraj lives, he distributes all the money to the people in the camp. He has just enough money for a fake passport and ticket to India. But before going to India he goes to Paris where he meets Marie, who is now dating another guy.

He comes back to India and starts working as a teacher in school. One day Marie comes to the school and tells Aja that she has left her fiance, and then they kiss. And with this he ends his story to the three kids. He then offers those kids to be pardoned for the four year custody if they attend Aja's school daily, which they agree to.

Just before the movie ends, one of Aja's colleagues asks "Was that a true story?" and Aja replies "Yes, all of the important bits."

== Cast ==
- Dhanush as Ajatashatru "Aja" Lavash Patel
  - Hearty Singh as young Aja
- Bérénice Bejo as Nelly Marnay
- Erin Moriarty as Marie Rivière
- Barkhad Abdi as Wiraj
- Gérard Jugnot as Gustave Palourde
- Ben Miller as Officer Smith
- Abel Jafri as Captain Fik
- Sarah-Jeanne Labrosse as Rose
- Kay Greidanus as Pieter
- Amrutha Sant as Siringh, Aja's mom
- Harshad Kumar as vegetable vendor
- Rakesh Jaiswal as Doctor
- Romain Puertolas as Thomas Grégoire

== Production ==
The film was launched in January 2016 with Iranian director Marjane Satrapi and actors Dhanush, Uma Thurman, and Alexandra Daddario in the lead roles. However, the director left the project and was replaced by Canadian director Ken Scott. Thurman's role was given to French actress Bérénice Bejo. The filming began in May 2017 in Mumbai. In its first schedule the principal photography took place in India, Brussels, Paris and Rome.

== Soundtrack ==
The Extraordinary Journey of the Fakir

Soundtrack album by Amit Trivedi
- Recorded: 2019
- Studio: A T Studios
- Genre: Feature film soundtrack
- Length: 11:25
- Language: Hindi
- Label: Zee Music Company
- Producer: Amit Trivedi

Amit Trivedi chronology
India's Most Wanted (2019)	The Extraordinary Journey of the Fakir (2019)	Mission Mangal (2019)

The score is composed by Nicolas Errera
The music of the songs is composed by Amit Trivedi, with lyrics by Anvita Dutt. The Zee Music Company holds the right.

English Track listing (features Hindi songs)
No.	Title	Lyrics	Singer(s)	Length
1.	"Angrezi Luv Shuv"	Anvita Dutt	Amit Trivedi, Jonita Gandhi	3:39
2.	"Madaari"	Anvita Dutt	Vishal Dadlani, Nikhita Gandhi, Rajiv Sundaresan, Suhas Sawant	3:59
3.	"Maila Maila"	Anvita Dutt	Mame Khan, R Venkatraman	3:37
Total length:				11:25

All lyrics are written by Madhan Karky.

Tamil Track listing
No.	Title	Singer(s)	Length
1.	"Maayabazaaru"	Nikhita Gandhi, Benny Dayal	2:53
2.	"Saalakaara"	Anthony Daasan	2:45
3.	"Engleesu Lovesu"	Dhanush, Jonita Gandhi	2:32
Total length:			07:30

== Release ==
The film trailer for Australia was launched in August 2018 by Icon Films Australia & New Zealand on YouTube. For release in India the official trailer was launched on 3 June 2019 by Zee Music Company.

The Extraordinary Journey of The Fakir released on 30 May 2018 in France as L'Extraordinaire Voyage du Fakir. The film was released in India, USA, Canada, UK, Singapore and Malaysia on 21 June 2019. The film was also dubbed in Tamil as Pakkiri (transl. Fakir) benefiting off Dhanush's popularity. The makers had previously considered the title Vaazhkaiyai Thedi Naanum Poren (transl. I too will go in search of life) for the dubbed version, which was based on the song "Udhungada Sangu" from Velaiyilla Pattathari (2014) also starring Dhanush. Dhanush sang that same song while promoting the film in Paris. The film was made available to stream on Amazon Prime Video.

== Critical reception ==
On review aggregator Rotten Tomatoes, the film holds an approval rating of 60% based on 30 reviews, with an average rating of 5.3/10. The critics consensus reads, "The Extraordinary Journey of the Fakir is undermined by its mawkish indulgences, but Dhanush's charming central performance is difficult to resist." On Metacritic, the film has a weighted average score of 56 out of 100, based on 8 critics.

The New York Times stated that the film is "a bustling, whimsical voyage.”

== Box office ==
The Extraordinary Journey of the Fakir fared poorly at the box office, grossing $3.26 million against a $20 million budget. This movie was a box office bomb.

== Awards and nominations ==
The film won two international awards:

Year	Award	Category	Outcome	Ref.
2018	Norwegian International Film Festival	Ray of Sunshine Award	Won	
2019	Barcelona Sant-Jordi International Film Festival	Best Comedy	Won	
