= Jamie Christopher =

British assistant director and film producer (1971–2023)

- Publicity Photo of Jamie Christopher
- Born: 22 December 1971; London, England
- Died: 29 August 2023 (aged 52); Los Angeles, California, U.S.
- Occupation(s): Assistant director Film producer
- Years active: 1989–2023
- Notable work: Harry Potter; Resident Evil: Retribution; Thor: The Dark World; Guardians of the Galaxy; Avengers: Age of Ultron; Star Wars: The Last Jedi

Jamie Christopher (22 December 1971 – 29 August 2023) was a British assistant director and film producer. He worked on numerous films including the Harry Potter series, Guardians of the Galaxy, Avengers: Age of Ultron, and Star Wars: The Last Jedi.

== Early life ==
Christopher's parents, Malcolm J. Christopher and Penny Christopher both worked in the film industry.

== Career ==
Christopher's first credited role was as a third assistant director on Alien 3.

Christopher worked in the first assistant director role, or the same role for a second unit for all eight Harry Potter movies, which made him the primary assistant director for the franchise.

He often worked with James Gunn, Rian Johnson, and Kevin Feige.

== Death ==
Christopher died in Los Angeles of heart complications on 29 August 2023, at the age of 52.

The Fantastic Four: First Steps is dedicated to his memory, along with Matt Shakman’s mother Inez.
