= Petros Palian =

Iranian Armenian cinematographer (1931–2023)

- پطروس پالیان
- Born: 1 May 1931; Tehran, Pahlavi Iran (now Iran)
- Died: 15 March 2023 (aged 91); Los Angeles, California, U.S.
- Other names: Peter Palian
- Education: Syracuse University
- Occupations: Cinematographer, videographer, film producer, memoirist
- Spouse: Rose Schreier (m. 1967)

Petros "Peter" Palian (Persian: پطروس پالیان, Armenian: Պետրոս Պալյան; 1 May 1931 – 15 March 2023) was an Iranian Armenian cinematographer and videographer. He was the videographer for Shah Mohammad Reza Pahlavi in the 1950s.

== Life and career ==
Petros Palian was born on 1 May 1931, in Tehran, Pahlavi Iran, to a family of Armenian heritage. His father died when he was 3 years old.

Palian was the exclusive videographer for Shah Mohammad Reza Pahlavi and the royal court for 7 years in the 1950s. He attended Syracuse University in Syracuse, New York, and studied film. Palian married in 1967 to Rose Schreier from New Jersey, after marriage the couple lived in New York City.

Palian was awarded the 1961 Silver Bear at the Berlin Film Festival for his work on Flaming Poppies, and the 1964 "Best Youth Film Award" at the Cannes Film Festival for his work on Dawn of the Capricorn.

Palian lived in Los Angeles after the Iranian Revolution, where he worked as the director of photography for many of Amir Shervan's films under the name "Peter". He published his memoirs in the book titled, I Shot the Shah: The Untold Stories (2018).

He died at age 91 on 15 March 2023, in Los Angeles.

== Filmography ==
Date	Title	Role	Notes
1955	Halo (1955 film)	videographer	
1963	Flaming Poppies	cinematographer	a short documentary film
1964	Dawn of the Capricorn	cinematographer	also known as Dawn of the Jedi
1965	Night of the Hunchback	cinematographer	
1967	Siavash in Persepolis	cinematographer	
1968	Love After Death	director of photography	
1969	The Invincible Six	second unit photographer	
1972	An Isfahani in New York	cinematographer, film producer, editor	
1974	Friends (1974 film)	cinematographer	
1978	Made in Iran	cinematographer, director of photography	
1982	Assignment Berlin	cinematographer	
1987	Hollywood Cop	director of photography	
1991	Samurai Cop	cinematographer	
2005	Dangerous Men	cinematographer	
