= Yemen: The Silent War =

- Directed by: Sufian Abulohom
- Produced by: Sufian Abulohom
- Cinematography: Sufian Abulohom
- Release date: 2018
- Running time: 11:26
- Country: Yemen
- Language: Arabic

Yemen: The Silent War is a 2018 short documentary film directed by the Yemeni film maker Sufian Abulohom about the Yemen War.

== Plot ==
The documentary tells the stories of Yemeni refugees living in Markazi Refugee Camp. Since the war started in Yemen in early 2015, more than 3 million people have been internally displaced and around 180,000 have fled the country. Thousands of Yemeni refugees have returned to Yemen preferring the uncertainty of the war over the camps' conditions. According to United Nations High Commissioner for Refugees (UNHCR) Inter-Agency Operation update in October 2017, a total of 2,170 Yemenis remain at the Markazi Refugee Camp in Obock, Djibouti.

== Reception ==
Professional ratings
Review scores
Source	Rating
UK Film Review	4/5 stars
The Independent Critic	A-
Indie Shorts	4/5 stars
Indyred	3.5/5 stars

The film was praised for its use of hand drawing animation, described by Richard Propes from The Independent Critic as "The most impactful decision made by Abulohom". Propes also described the documentary as "a devastating film to experience" and praised Abulohom's ability to capture the stories "simply, yet powerfully".

Chris Olson from UK Film Review called it "viscerally sorrowful" and "emotionally ferocious".

Nimisha Menon from Indie Shorts Mag described the film as a brutal depiction of an even more brutal time.
