= Dangerous Men =

2005 film by Jahangir Salehi Yeganehrad

- Poster for the 2015 re-release
- Directed by: John S. Rad
- Written by: John S. Rad
- Produced by: John S. Rad
- Starring: James Brockman; Kelay Miller; Melody Wiggans; John Clure; George Derby; Honey Goldberg; Michael Gradilone; Roohi; Roya Saghafy; Bryan Jenkins
- Cinematography: Peter Palian
- Edited by: John S. Rad; Roubic Zadourian
- Music by: John S. Rad
- Production company: Sima Sim International
- Distributed by: Drafthouse Films
- Release date: September 23, 2005 (Los Angeles)
- Running time: 80 minutes
- Country: United States
- Language: English

Dangerous Men is a 2005 American action thriller film written, directed, and produced by Jahangir Salehi Yeganehrad, under the pseudonym John S. Rad. The film took twenty-one years to make and release, production beginning in 1984 and edits being made throughout the intervening years.

== Plot ==
The plot of Dangerous Men is nigh incomprehensible, and changes abruptly towards the middle of the film.

Mina (Melody Wiggins) and her fiancé, Daniel (Coti Cook) are walking on a beach when two bikers, named Tiger and Leo, set upon them. They kill the fiancé and attempt to rape Mina. In the struggle, Leo is killed and Tiger goes to leave the beach. Mina insists that he take her along, secretly plotting his murder.

After taking Mina for a steak dinner at a motel, Tiger retires with her to their room. Mina distracts Tiger by having him rub her knees and lick her bellybutton before producing a knife hidden in her buttocks and stabbing him to death, taking revenge for her fiancé.

Mina flees into the desert, where she is picked up by a British man driving a pickup truck. The driver pulls over and attempts to rape Mina at gunpoint. She threatens to castrate him with her knife and sends him off, nude, to wander the desert. The film follows him for approximately five minutes as he narrates his own misfortune, occasionally addressing his own penis. He is seen singing and dancing as he wanders about. Eventually a van passes him by and he is pelted with garbage.

Mina visits a sex worker and asks her to teach her to be "one of the girls of the night," a ruse which she uses to kill several potential Johns with her knife. Mina's campaign of murders is reported on the news and comes to the attention of the police.

A police detective (who is the brother of Mina's fiancé) begins investigating a biker gang (led by the as-yet unseen Black Pepper, played by Bryan Jenkins), despite nominally being on vacation. He pays a bartender $300 for information about the bikers. Later, the detective tails one biker onto the beach where he is attempting to rape a young woman (Annali Aeristos). The detective chokes him into unconsciousness.

In the next scene, the biker gang is driving in a convoy. The biker from the previous scene is distracted by the young woman he failed to rape, who is sunning herself on the hood of a car by the roadside. Unbeknownst to him, the detective is concealed in the car, wearing a bulletproof vest and motorcycle helmet. When the biker pulls over to once again attempt to rape the young woman, the police detective attempts to intervene. However, he spends several minutes attempting to extricate his foot which is stuck under a seat. Eventually he frees himself and chokes the biker into unconsciousness.

The detective drives away with the biker bound in his back seat. He learns Black Pepper's location and drives to the foot of the hill where his house is located.

In an unrelated scene, Mina is arrested by several other police officers in a public park.

In the house, Black Pepper and a young woman watch a belly dancer perform. They then retire to Black Pepper's bedroom. They are interrupted in an amorous moment by one of Black Pepper's subordinates who tells him the police have arrived. After a fight in the house, Black Pepper flees into the brush and is pursued by the police chief.

The chief chases Black Pepper through a small cave and into a neighboring house. Black Pepper is poised to rape the young blind woman who lives in the house. However, she produces a pistol from under her sewing and starts firing at Black Pepper. Shortly after, the chief arrives and arrests Black Pepper. The film abruptly ends on a freeze frame.

== Cast ==
- James Brockman as Mina's Father
- Kelay Miller as Daniel
- Melody Wiggans as Mina
- John Clure as Biker (Leo)
- George Derby as Biker (Tiger)
- Honey Goldberg as Waitress
- Michael Gradilone as Police Detective
- Roohi as Belly Dancer
- Roya Saghafy as Wife
- Bryan Jenkins as Black Pepper
- Coti Cook as Black Detective's Fiancee
- Annali Aeristos as Dart Player

== Production and release ==
Director–producer–writer John S. Rad was a trained architect who had worked in film production in Iran. He fled the revolution in 1979 and began auditions for his first American project in 1984. A 'finished' version of the film was screened as early as 1985, but work continued on and off for the next two decades. The film was not released until 2005, when Rad paid for a week-long run in five Los Angeles theaters. At least one person saw the film three times.

Dangerous Men was re-released in 2015 by Drafthouse Films.

== Reception ==
On the review aggregator website Rotten Tomatoes, 50% of 10 critics' reviews are positive, with an average rating of 4.9/10. Metacritic, which uses a weighted average, assigned the film a score of 32 out of 100, based on 6 critics, indicating "generally unfavorable" reviews.

In a scathing review, Frank Scheck of The Hollywood Reporter noted, "In his handling his multiple assignments Rad shows no discernible talent for any of them. The pacing is bizarre (at one point there's a long belly dancing interlude, for no apparent reason); the dialogue is laughably atrocious; the production values are non-existent; the acting is embarrassing; the fight scenes are ineptly staged, with loud sound effects failing to compensate for the fact that no blows are landed; and the synthesizer-heavy musical score sounds left over from a '70s porn film." But the review also stated the film "is sure to become an instant cult classic."

Matt Fagerholm of RogerEbert.com gave the film zero out of four stars and wrote, "Bad acting, bad writing, bad directing, bad music, bad sound and bad fight choreography can only take a film so far. A film must be entertaining on its own terms in order to be worth recommending, and Dangerous Men is, for the most part, a bore. That won't stop midnight audiences from loving every frame of this moldy cheese-fest, but as Tommy Wiseau so indelibly noted, 'Love is blind.'"

Conversely, Katie Rife of The A.V. Club gave it a B+ and wrote, "Ridiculous, artless, and wildly entertaining, Dangerous Men is more than the sum of its fascinatingly misguided parts, although it will take a special sort of moviegoer to truly appreciate (or endure, depending on your perspective) its charms. Its instant cult-classic status is all but assured."
