= An Isfahani in New York =

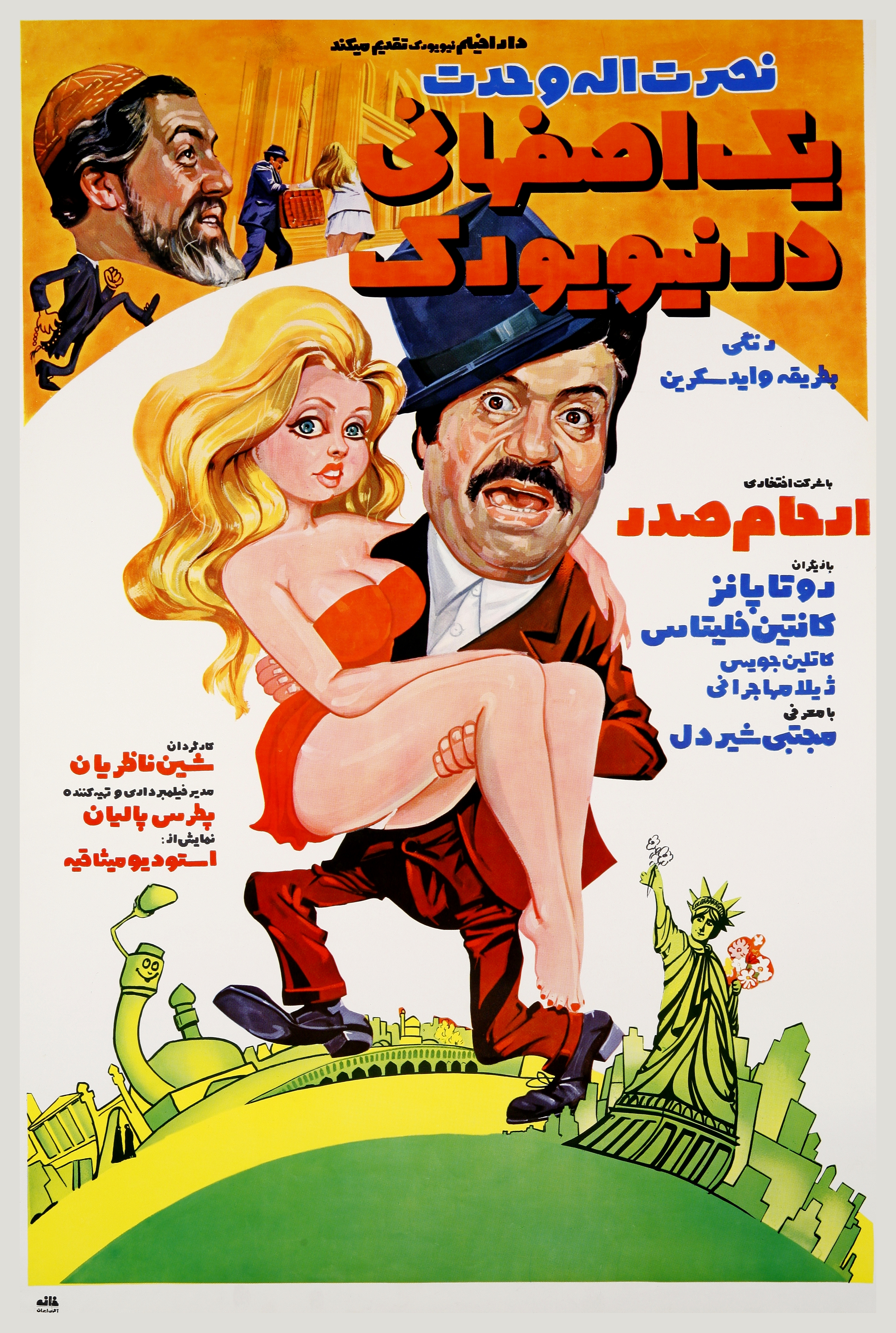
- یک اصفهانی در نیویورک
- Directed by: Shaollah Nazerian
- Written by: Asadolleh Soleimanifar
- Produced by: Petros Palian
- Starring: Nosratollah Vahdat
- Cinematography: Petros Palian
- Color process: Color
- Production company: Misaghieh Studio
- Release date: 1972
- Running time: 93 minutes
- Country: Iran
- Language: Persian

An Isfahani in New York (Persian: یک اصفهانی در نیویورک, romanized: Yak isfahānī dar New York) is a 1972 Iranian comedy drama film, directed by Shaollah Nazerian.

== Plot ==
Hooshang (Reza Arham Sadr) leaves his hometown of Isfahan, Iran and travels to New York City to attend school. He hangs out with a group of thugs and loses all of his money. His fiancée Susan (Annie Gagen) is looking for an opportunity to save Houshang from the situation. Hooshang requests money from his father Mirza, through a letter. Mirza, who is financially strapped, sends his other son, Ahmad (Nosratollah Vahdat), to New York City with the requested money.

== Cast ==
- Nosratollah Vahdat, as Ahmad
- Reza Arham Sadr, as Hooshang
- Annie Gagen, as Susan
- Soroor Rajai
