= Crash Test Aglaé =

- Directed by: Éric Gravel
- Written by: Éric Gravel
- Produced by: Nicolas Sanfaute; Gilles Sitbon; Grégoire Lassalle; Lionel Montabord
- Starring: India Hair; Julie Depardieu; Yolande Moreau
- Cinematography: Gilles Piquard
- Edited by: Reynald Bertrand
- Music by: Philippe Deshaies; Lionel Flairs; Benoit Rault; Jean-Michel Pigeon
- Production company: Novoprod
- Distributed by: Le Pacte
- Release date: 2 August 2017
- Running time: 85 minutes
- Country: France
- Language: French
- Budget: $2.5 million
- Box office: $1.1 million

Crash Test Aglaé is a 2017 French comedy road film directed and written by Éric Gravel.

== Plot ==
Aglaé (India Hair) is a rigidly work-obsessed young crash test technician with obsessive-compulsive disorder whose whole world is her work, apart from her adoration of the game of cricket. But then the French factory where she works is closed because the work can be done cheaper in India. Aglaé and two colleagues – Liette (Julie Depardieu) and Marcelle (Yolande Moreau) – decide to accept the company's not-very-serious offer of relocation, and set out from rural France for India in Marcelle's dreadful old jalopy, a quirky journey that ends up as an unlikely personal voyage.

== Cast ==
- India Hair as Aglaé Lanctot
- Julie Depardieu as Liette
- Yolande Moreau as Marcelle
- Anne Charrier as The HRD
- Frédérique Bel as Lola
- Tristán Ulloa as Clovis
- Adil Hussain as Shankar
- Hanns Zischler as Friedrich Fürstenberg

== Production ==
The movie is shot in Conflans-Sainte-Honorine, Île-de-France, Lorraine, Poland, Kazakhstan and India. Shooting started on 4 September 2015 and ended on 25 November 2015.
