= List of LGBTQ-related films of 1998 =

This is a list of lesbian, gay, bisexual, transgender or queer-related films released in 1998. It contains theatrically released films that deal with important gay, lesbian, bisexual, transgender or queer characters or issues and may have same-sex romance or relationships as a plot device.

== Films ==
Title	Director	Country	Genre	Cast	Notes
2by4	Jimmy Smallhorne	United States	Drama	Jimmy Smallhorne, Chris O'Neill, Bradley Fitts, Holyoke Joe, Terry McGoff, Michael Liebman, Ronan Carr, Leo Hamill, Seamus McDonagh and Kimberly Topper	
54	Mark Christopher	United States	Drama	Ryan Phillippe, Salma Hayek, Neve Campbell, Mike Myers, Sela Ward, Breckin Meyer and Sherry Stringfield	Mainly set in the New York City discotheque Studio 54
2 Seconds (2 secondes)	Manon Briand	Canada	Comedy, drama, romance	Charlotte Laurier, Dino Tavarone, Jonathan Bolduc, Suzanne Clément, Yves Pelletier and Louise Forestier	
The Adventures of Sebastian Cole	Tod Williams	United States	Comedy, drama	Adrian Grenier, Clark Gregg, Aleksa Palladino, Margaret Colin, John Shea, Marni Lustig, Joan Copeland, Tom Lacy, Gabriel Macht, Russel Harper, Rory Cochrane, Famke Janssen, Nicole Ari Parker, Marisol Padilla Sánchez and Levon Helm	
Bedrooms and Hallways	Rose Troche	United Kingdom	Romance, comedy	Kevin McKidd, James Purefoy, Tom Hollander, Julie Graham, Simon Callow, Con O'Neill, Harriet Walter, Christopher Fulford, Jennifer Ehle, Tom Hollander, Paul Higgins and Hugo Weaving	
Beefcake	Thom Fitzgerald	Canada; United Kingdom; France	Docu-drama/Drama	Daniel MacIvor, Joshua Peace, Jack Griffin Mazeika, Carroll Godsman, Jonathan Torrens, Thomas Cawood, Jaime Robertson, Dick Sircom, Thom Fitzgerald, Orest Ulan, Glen Deveau, Andrew Miller, Marla McLean, Daniel McLaren, Bernard Robichaud, Marc St. Onge, Steve MacLaughlin, Andy Smith, James Mac Swain, Michael Weir, Marc Le Blanc, Timothy Phillips, Jonathan Langlois-Sadubin, Lucy Decoutere and Sarah Dunsworth	
Billy's Hollywood Screen Kiss	Tommy O'Haver	United States	Romance, comedy	Sean P. Hayes, Brad Rowe, Richard Ganoung, Meredith Scott Lynn, Matthew Ashford, Armando Valdes-Kennedy, Paul Bartel, Holly Woodlawn, Christopher Bradley, Robbie Cain, Carmine D. Giovinazzo. Les Borsay and Jason-Shane Scott	
Bishonen	Yonfan	Hong Kong	Romance, drama	Stephen Fung, Daniel Wu, Shu Qi, Terence Yin, Jason Tsang, Kenneth Tsang, Lisa Chiao Chiao, Cheung Tat-ming, James Wong, Joe Junior, Paul Fonoroff, Michael Lam, Yim Chim-lam, Ma Man-ming, Wu Kai-kwong, Sherwin Ming and Brigitte Lin	
Bombay Boys	Kaizad Gustad	India	Comedy, drama	Naveen Andrews, Rahul Bose, Alexander Gifford, Naseeruddin Shah, Tara Deshpande, Roshan Seth, Tarun Shahani, Luke Kenny, Vinay Pathak, Kushal Punjabi, Javed Jaffrey and Nagesh Bhosle	
The Brandon Teena Story	Susan Muska, Greta Olafsdottir	United States	Documentary	Follows the 1993 murder of Brandon Teena	At Berlin Film Festival, won Teddy Award for Best Documentary
Caresses	Ventura Pons	Spain	Drama	David Selvas, Laura Conejero, Julieta Serrano, Montserrat Salvador, Agustín González, Naim Thomas (billed as Naïm Thomàs), Sergi López, Mercè Pons, Jordi Dauder, Roger Coma, Rosa Maria Sardà, Jordi Cercós, Sandra Pascual and Guillermo Pardevila	a.k.a. Carícies
Dear Jesse	Tim Kirkman	United States	Documentary	interviews with Lee Smith, Allan Gurganus and people in the street, including Matthew Shepard	
Don't Tell Anyone	Francisco J. Lombardi	Spain; Peru	Comedy, drama	Santiago Magill, Christian Meier, Lucía Jiménez, Giovanni Ciccia, Vanessa Robbiano, Carlos Fuentes, Gianfranco Brero, Carlos Tuccio, Anibal Zamora, Emilram Cossío, Jorge Lopez Cano, Alonso Alegría, Gerardo Ruiz, Johnny Mendoza, Javier Echevarría, Michael Scally, Gilberto Torres, Gisella Vega, Coco Castillo, Rasec Barragan, Tono Espinoza, Bernye Paz and Greta Frick	a.k.a. No se lo digas a nadie
Edge of Seventeen	David Moreton	United States	Romance, comedy, drama	Chris Stafford, Tina Holmes, Andersen Gabrych, Stephanie McVay, Lea DeLaria, Tony Maietta, Barbie Marie, John Eby and Jeff Fryer	
Everything Will Be Fine (Alles wird gut)	Angelina Maccarone	Germany	Romantic comedy		
The Fall of Communism as Seen in Gay Pornography	William E. Jones	United States	Documentary		
Finding North	Tanya Wexler	United States	Romance, comedy, drama	Wendy Makkena, John Benjamin Hickey, Jonathan Walker, Anne Bobby, Rebecca Creskoff, Angela Pietropinto, Freddie Roman, Molly McClure, Jay Michaelson, Yusef Bulos, Garrett Moran, Steven Jones, Lynn Metrik, Phyllis Cicero, Spiro Malas, Amy Zimmerman, Jonah Marsh, Bo Barron, Cherami Leigh, Matt Whitton, Jody Napolotano, Gail Cronauer, R. Bruce Elliott, Kermit Key, Richard Rogers, Russ Marker, T.J. Morehouse, Mary Sheldon, Westin Self and Norman Bennett	
Forever Fever	Glen Goei	Singapore	Comedy, drama	Adrian Pang, Medaline Tan, Anna Belle Francis, Pierre Png, Caleb Goh and Dominic Pace	
From the Edge of the City	Constantinos Giannaris	Greece	Crime, drama	Stathis Papadopoulos, Theodora Tzimou, Costas Kotsianisis and Panagiotis Hartomatzidis	a.k.a. Apo tin akri tis polis
Get Real	Simon Shore	United Kingdom	Romance, drama	Ben Silverstone, Brad Gorton, Charlotte Brittain, Jacquetta May, David Lumsden, Richard Hawley, Martin Milman, Stacy Hart, Kate McEnery, Patrick Nielsen, Tim Harris, James D. White, James Perkins, Nicholas Hunter, Steven Mason, Morgan Jones, Ian Brimble, Judy Buxton, David Elliot, Charlotte Hanson, Louise J. Taylor, Steven Elder, Leonie Thomas, David Paul West and Andy Rashleigh	Screenplay by Patrick Wilde, based on his play What's Wrong with Angry?
Gia	Michael Cristofer	United States	Drama	Angelina Jolie, Faye Dunaway, Elizabeth Mitchell, Mercedes Ruehl, Scott Cohen, Edmund Genest, Alexander Enberg, Louis Giambalvo, Eric Michael Cole, Kylie Travis, John Considine, James Haven, Rick Batalla, Brian Donovan, Tricia O'Neil, Sam Pancake, Adina Porter, Michael E. Rodgers, Nick Spano and Jason Stuart	Based on the life of Gia Carangi
Gods and Monsters	Bill Condon	United Kingdom; United States	Drama	Ian McKellen, Brendan Fraser, Lynn Redgrave, Lolita Davidovich, Jack Plotnick, Matt McKenzie, David Dukes, Rosalind Ayres, Jack Betts, Martin Ferrero, Marlon Braccia, Amir Aboulela, Cornelia Hayes O'Herlihy, Jesse James and Arthur Dignam	
Goodbye Emma Jo	Cheryl Newbrough	United States	Short	Cheryl Newbrough, Emma-Jane Mezher and Katherine Woodman	40 min long
The Grace of God	Gerald L'Ecuyer	Canada	Docudrama	Michael Riley, Steve Cumyn, David Cronenberg	
Hard	John Huckert	United States	Crime, drama	Noel Palomaria, Malcolm Moorman, Charles Lanyer, Michael Waite, Paula Kay Perry, Alex Depedro, Bob Hollander, Steve Andrews, K.D. Jones (billed as KD Jones), Ken Narasaki, Steve Gonzales, Cynthia Downey, Chas Gray, Brandi Garay and M. Tiffany Reed	
Head On	Ana Kokkinos	Australia	Drama	Alex Dimitriades. Paul Capsis, Julian Garner, Tony Nikolakopoulos, Elena Mandalis, Damien Fotiou, Eugenia Fragos, María Mercedes, Alex Papps, Dora Kaskanis, Vassili Zappa and Andrea Mandalis	Based on the novel Loaded by Christos Tsiolkas
High Art	Lisa Cholodenko	Canada; United States	Romance, drama	Ally Sheedy, Radha Mitchell, Gabriel Mann, Charis Michelsen, David Thornton, Anh Duong, Patricia Clarkson, Helen Mendes, Bill Sage, Tammy Grimes, Cindra Feuer, Anthony Ruivivar, Elaine Tse, Rudolf Martin and Laura Ekstrand	
In the Flesh	Ben Taylor	United States	Mystery	Dane Ritter, Ed Corbin	
Julie and Me (Revoir Julie)	Jeanne Crépeau	Canada	Comedy, drama	Dominique Leduc and Stephanie Morgenstern	
Like It Is	Paul Oremland	United Kingdom	Drama	Steve Bell, Ian Rose, Roger Daltrey and Dani Behr	
Love Is the Devil: Study for a Portrait of Francis Bacon	John Maybury	United Kingdom; France; Japan	Drama	Derek Jacobi, Daniel Craig, Tilda Swinton, Anne Lambton, Adrian Scarborough, Karl Johnson, Annabel Brooks, Richard Newbould (billed as Richard Newbold), Ariel de Ravenel, Tallulah, Andy Linden, David Kennedy, Gary Hume, Damian Dibben, Antony Cotton, Hamish Bowles and Martin Meister	
The Man Who Drove with Mandela	Greta Schiller	United Kingdom, United States, South Africa, Netherlands, Belgium	Documentary		Portrait of theatre director and anti-apartheid activist Cecil Williams
Mob Queen	Jon Carnoy	United States	Romance, comedy	David Proval, Dan Moran, Candis Cayne, Tony Sirico and Marlene Forte	
The Object of My Affection	Nicholas Hytner	United States	Romance, comedy, drama	Jennifer Aniston, Paul Rudd, Allison Janney, Alan Alda, Tim Daly, Joan Copeland, Steve Zahn, Amo Gulinello, Nigel Hawthorne, Kali Rocha, Gabriel Macht, Sarah Hyland, Hayden Panettiere, Liam Aiken, Bruce Altman, Daniel Cosgrove, Samia Shoaib, Audra McDonald, Lauren Pratt, Paz de la Huerta, Salem Ludwig, Antonia Rey, John Roland, Rosanna Scotto, Kevin Carroll and Kia Goodwin	Based on the novel of the same name by Stephen McCauley
The Opposite of Sex	Don Roos	United States	Romance, comedy, drama	Christina Ricci, Ivan Sergei, Martin Donovan, Lisa Kudrow, Lyle Lovett, William Lee Scott, Johnny Galecki and Colin Ferguson	
Out of the Past	Jeff Dupre	United States	Documentary	Narrator Linda Hunt and uses voices of; Stephen Spinella, Gwyneth Paltrow, Cherry Jones, Edward Norton and Leland Gantt	Won the audience award for Best Documentary at Sundance Film Festival; Won the GLAAD Media Award for Outstanding Documentary at the 10th GLAAD Media Awards
Party Monster: The Shockumentary	Fenton Bailey, Randy Barbato	United States	Documentary	Michael Alig, Gitsie, James St. James, Keoki and Eric Bernat	Details the rise of party promoter and Club Kids ringleader Michael Alig and his murder of Andre "Angel" Melendez
Psycho	Gus Van Zant	United States	Horror	Vince Vaughn, Anne Heche, Julianne Moore	Remake of the original by Alfred Hitchcock
Relax...It's Just Sex	P. J. Castellaneta	United States	Romantic comedy	Mitchell Anderson, Seymour Cassel, Eddie Garcia	
Scènes de lit	François Ozon	France	Short	Valérie Druguet, François Delaive and Camille Japy	
Sex/Life in L.A.	Jochen Hick	Germany; United States	Documentary, adult	Ron Athey, (porn actor) Matt Bradshaw, Rick Castro (porn actor), Kevin Kramer (porn actor), Cole Tucker and Tony Ward	Shown at Melbourne International Film Festival
Sitcom	François Ozon	France	Drama, thriller, comedy	François Marthouret, Évelyne Dandry, Adrien de Van, Marina de Van, Stéphane Rideau, Lucia Sanchez, Jules-Emmanuel Eyoum Deido, Jean Douchet, Sébastien Charles, Vincent Vizioz, Kiwani Cojo, Gilles Frilay and Antoine Fischer	
Show Me Love	Lukas Moodysson	Sweden; Denmark	Romance, drama	Alexandra Dahlström, Rebecka Liljeberg, Erica Carlson, Mathias Rust, Stefan Hörberg, Josefine Nyberg, Ralph Carlsson, Maria Hedborg, Axel Widegren and Jill Ung	aka Fucking Åmål
Some Prefer Cake	Heidi Arnesen	United States	Comedy, drama, romance	Kathleen Fontaine, Tara Howley and Desi del Valle	
Soft Hearts (Pusong Mamon)	Joel Lamangan	Philippines	Comedy	Lorna Tolentino, Eric Quizon Albert Martinez, Eugene Domingo, Caridad Sanchez and Jake Roxas	
Stiff Upper Lips	Gary Sinyor	United Kingdom; India	Comedy	Sean Pertwee, Georgina Cates, Robert Portal, Samuel West, Prunella Scales and Peter Ustinov	Parody of British period films, especially the Merchant-Ivory movies of the 1980s and early 1990s
The Thin Pink Line	Joe Dietl; Michael Irpino	United States	Comedy	Jennifer Aniston, Alexis Arquette, Andrea Bendewald and Megan Cavanagh	
Those Who Love Me Can Take the Train (Ceux qui m'aiment prendront le train)	Patrice Chéreau	France	Drama	Pascal Greggory, Vincent Perez, Charles Berling and Dominique Blanc	
Two Girls and a Baby	Kelli Simpson	Australia	Short, comedy	Claudia Karvan, Nicki Wendt, Pippa Grandison and Greg Stone	
Velvet Goldmine	Todd Haynes	United Kingdom; United States	Drama	Ewan McGregor, Jonathan Rhys Meyers, Toni Collette and Christian Bale	
The Versace Murder	Menahem Golan	United States	Biography, Crime	Franco Nero, Steven Bauer, Shane Perdue	
We're Funny That Way!	David Adkin	Canada	Comedy, documentary		Documentary on the We're Funny That Way! comedy festival, featuring Scott Capurro, Maggie Cassella, Kate Clinton, Lea DeLaria, Elvira Kurt, Bob Smith
When Love Comes Along	Garth Maxwell	New Zealand	Romance, drama	Rena Owen, Dean O'Gorman, Simon Prast, Nancy Brunning, Sophia Hawthorne and Simon Westaway	
Wild Things	John McNaughton	United States	Thriller, crime, erotic	Kevin Bacon, Matt Dillon, Denise Richards, Neve Campbell, Theresa Russell, Daphne Rubin-Vega, Carrie Snodgress, Jeff Perry, Robert Wagner, Bill Murray	
The Wolves of Kromer	Will Gould	United Kingdom	Romance, comedy, fantasy, horror	Boy George (narrator), James Layton, Lee Williams and Margaret Towner	Co-written by Charles Lambert, based on his play of the same name
Woubi Chéri	Laurent Bocahut, Philip Brooks	France; Ivory Coast	Documentary		Won Best Documentary awards at the New York Lesbian, Gay, Bisexual, & Transgender Film Festival, the Turin International Lesbian & Gay Film Festival, and the Transgender Festival in London.
Your Friends & Neighbors	Neil LaBute	United States	Comedy, drama	Amy Brenneman, Aaron Eckhart, Catherine Keener, Nastassja Kinski, Jason Patric and Ben Stiller	First film to be reviewed on Rotten Tomatoes
