= Pete Shaw (author) =

British author, broadcaster, programmer and theatrical producer

- Born: 1966 (age 59–60); Isleworth, London
- Occupations: journalist, technical writer
- Writing career
- Period: 1982—
- Subjects: Computing & Theatre

Pete Shaw is a British author, broadcaster, programmer and theatrical producer.

== Early life ==
Shaw attended school in Stanwell, Middlesex. While at Stanwell Secondary School, he was introduced by a school friend to Tim Hartnell, the co-owner of Interface Publication, the other owner being his school friend's mother, Sue North.

His first published computer program was The Elephant's Graveyard, written for the Sinclair ZX81 and published in the magazine ZX Computing in August 1982.

== Career ==
Shaw's first book, Games for your ZX Spectrum, was written late in 1982 and published the following year by Virgin Books in conjunction with Interface Publications and was an early title in a series of Games For Your ... books published by Virgin. Shaw himself wrote three more books for the series, including Games for your Oric, More Games for your Oric and Games for your Sinclair QL. Shaw also co-wrote two books designed to teach the adventure game genre, Creating Adventures on your ZX Spectrum (Interface Publications, 1983) and Creating Adventure on your BBC Micro (Interface Publications, 1985).

Shaw's books mainly comprised Type-In program listings for home computers, which were designed to teach-as-you-type, since the programs contained many comments on how the listing worked.

Before he even left school, Shaw was a regular contributor to ZX Computing and Home Computer Weekly, and on leaving Stanwell Secondary School he turned down a sought after place at Isleworth Art College to work full-time for the newly launched computer magazine Your Spectrum.

It was at Your Spectrum (which later was relaunched as Your Sinclair) that Shaw picked up the nickname Troubleshootin' Pete due to his regular column in the magazine in which he would answer reader questions that had been posed over the YS Helpline. Shaw's official title at Your Sinclair was Editorial Assistant when he first joined, but he was promoted to Deputy Editor within a year of joining the staff.

Your Sinclair was published by Dennis Publishing, and Shaw also contributed to other Dennis magazines including Your 64, Computer Shopper and MacUser.

While still Deputy Editor of Your Sinclair, Shaw also contributed to a weekly Capital Radio children's show called XYZ on Air, broadcast every Sunday and hosted by DJ Kelly Temple. The show was an eclectic mix of music, interviews, features and the 'Computerworld' slot hosted by Pete Shaw. It was Shaw's association with Capital Radio that brought about, The Capital Radio Book of Computers and Simple Programming (NeatQuest, 1985), co-written with Kelly Temple and Your Spectrum's original Editor, Roger Munford.

Before 1985 was out, Shaw had written at least eleven computer technical books, published around the world and in several languages.

== Bibliography ==
- Games for your ZX Spectrum (Virgin Books, 1983) ISBN 978-0-907080-84-8
  - Re-released as Spiele für Ihren ZX Spectrum (Huber, Germany), Spelletjes voor Je ZX Spectrum deel 1 (Netherlands), Games for your Timex-Sinclair 2000 (Dell, USA) ISBN 978-0-440-52794-7, Giochiamo con ZX Spectrum (Giochi Elettronici, Italy) ISBN 978-88-7605-118-0
- Games for your Oric (Virgin Books, 1983) ISBN 978-0-907080-91-6
- Getting Started on your Oric (Futura Publishing, 1983) ISBN 978-0-7088-2447-4
- Creating Adventures on the ZX Spectrum (Interface Publications, 1983) ISBN 978-0-907563-58-7
  - Re-released as Fantastische Avonturen voor je ZX Spectrum deel 1 (Netherlands), Novas Aventuras no Seu ZX Spectrum (Editorial Presenca, Portugal)
- More Games for your Oric (Virgin Books, 1984) ISBN 978-0-86369-034-1
- Games for your Sinclair QL (Virgin Books, 1984) ISBN 978-0-86369-078-5
- More Games for your Sinclair QL (Virgin Books, 1984)
- Games QL Computers Play (Corgi Books, 1985)
- Creating Adventures on your BBC Micro (Interface Publications, 1985) ISBN 978-0-907563-64-8
- Fantastic Adventures for your ZX Spectrum (Interface Publications, 1985)
- The Capital Radio Book of Computers and Computer Programming (NeatQuest, 1985) ISBN 978-0-947695-26-2
- The V-Book: The Complete Guide to Flying with Virgin Atlantic (V-Flyer, 2004)

== Since 2002 ==
In 2002 Shaw produced Patrick Wilde's play You Couldn't Make It Up at the Gilded Balloon in Edinburgh. The show was Wilde's follow up to What's Wrong with Angry?, which had debuted a decade earlier at the Lost Theatre in London. You Couldn't Make It Up was a black comedy dealing with issues of sexuality, the agendas of TV and film production and male rape. The year after its premiere in Edinburgh, Shaw brought the show down to the New End Theatre, Hampstead, London in 2003.

In 2006 Shaw collaborated with Sir Tim Rice to produce his musical Blondel at the Pleasance Theatre in Islington. Blondel was the first musical Rice wrote outside of his successful working partnership with Andrew Lloyd Webber. Telling the tale of medieval ministrel, Blondel, the musical is set in two acts. Shaw also created the poster artwork for revival of Blondel.

In May 2008 Shaw took a new play by Matt Ian Kelly called Lightning Strikes to Dublin as part of the Dublin Gay Theatre Festival. In August the same year, Shaw took What's Wrong with Angry? and Boys of the Empire to the Edinburgh Festival with Glenn Chandler, the latter of which he transferred to London at the King's Head Theatre for a limited run over Christmas 2008.

In 2011 he worked with photographer Paul Reiffer to create the website for The Grapes, famously owned by Evgeny Lebedev, Sean Mathias and Ian McKellen.

In 2011 Shaw also collaborated with producer Danielle Tarento on Drowning on Dry Land, which led to a string of further shows including Parade (2011), Noel & Gertie (2011), Burlesque (2011), The Pitchfork Disney (2012), Mack & Mabel (2012), Victor/Victoria (2012), Taboo (2012–2013) Titanic (2013)., Dogfight (2014), Man to Man (2014), The Grand Tour (2015), Grand Hotel (2015) and Dogfight In Concert (2015).

In 2017 was producing in his own right again, taking Ian Lindsay's Chinese Whispers to Greenwich Theatre for a two week run in July. The production starred Mark Farrelly, Steve Nallon, Peter Hardy, Matt Ian Kelly and Owl Young, with a cameo by Dermot Agnew.

Shaw is the owner of Internet publication Broadway Baby , a reviews-based website particularly focused on fringe theatre. He has increased Broadway Baby's traffic considerably since its creation in 2004. Broadway Baby is now the largest reviewer at the Edinburgh Festival Fringe by some margin. He also started the Virgin Atlantic customer site, V-Flyer.com in 2003 , which regularly receives over 150,000 readers per month.

During the Covid-19 pandemic of 2020, Shaw wrote and released a mobile App called Boozr. The App is a global database of pubs, bars and clubs with social networking features intended to facilitate users meeting up at specific pubs.

He continues to write computer programs on a freelance basis.

== Theatrical productions ==
- You Couldn't Make It Up (The Gilded Balloon, Edinburgh 2002) Producer
- You Couldn't Make It Up (New End Theatre, London 2003) Producer
- Diana & Ross (The Gilded Balloon, Edinburgh 2004) Graphic Designer
- Blondel (Pleasance Islington, London 2006) Co-Producer with Tim Rice
- Lightning Strikes (Project Arts Centre, Dublin 2008) Producer
- Boys of the Empire (C venues, Edinburgh 2008) Co-Producer with Glenn Chandler
- What's Wrong with Angry? (C venues, Edinburgh 2008) Co-Producer with Glenn Chandler
- Boys of the Empire (King's Head Theatre, Islington, London 2008) Co-Producer with Glenn Chandler
- What's Wrong with Angry? (King's Head Theatre, Islington, London 2009) Graphic Design & Sound Design
- Scouts in Bondage (King's Head Theatre, Islington, London 2009) Producer
- Searching for Eden (C venues, Edinburgh 2009) Graphic Designer
- Rat Pack Live (C venues, Edinburgh 2009) Graphic Designer
- Blues Brothers Live (C venues, Edinburgh 2009) Graphic Designer
- Broadway Baby Revue (C venues, Edinburgh 2009) Producer
- The Best of Times (Tristan Bates Theatre, London 2010) Graphic Designer
- Rat Pack Live (C venues, Edinburgh 2010) Graphic Designer
- Blues Brothers Live (C venues, Edinburgh 2010) Graphic Designer
- Elvis Live (C venues, Edinburgh 2010) Graphic Designer
- Fame, The Musical (C venues, Edinburgh 2010) Graphic Designer
- Jump (Pleasance, Edinburgh 2010) Graphic Designer
- The Crying Cherry (C venues, Edinburgh 2010) Graphic Designer
- Company (Southwark Playhouse, Southwark, London 2011) Marketing Consultant
- Drowning on Dry Land (Jermyn Street Theatre, West End, London 2011) Marketing Consultant
- What Goes Up (C venues, Edinburgh 2011) Graphic Designer
- Parade (Southwark Playhouse, Southwark, London 2011) Marketing Consultant
- Noel & Gertie (Cockpit Theatre, Marylebone, London 2011) Marketing Consultant
- Burlesque (Jermyn Street Theatre, West End, London 2011) Marketing Consultant
- The Pitchfork Disney (Arcola Theatre, Dalston, London 2012) Production Team
- Mack & Mabel (Southwark Playhouse, Southwark, London 2012) Production Team
- Taboo (Brixton Club House, Brixton, London 2012) Website Designer
- Victor/Victoria (Southwark Playhouse, Southwark, London 2012) Production Team
- Titanic (Southwark Playhouse, Southwark, London 2013) Production Team
- Parsifal and the Cup of Miracles (Gloucester Theatre 2014) Graphic Designer
- Dogfight (Southwark Playhouse, Southwark, London 2014) Production Team
- The Blue Flower (Gloucester Theatre 2014) Graphic Designer
- My Lifelong Love (Garrick Theatre, West End, London 2014) Graphic Designer
- Man To Man (Park Theatre, Finsbury Park, London 2014) Graphic Designer
- The Mikado (Charing Cross Theatre, West End, London 2014) Graphic Designer
- The Grand Tour (Finsborough Theatre, London 2015) Production Team
- Gods & Monsters (Southwark Playhouse, Southwark, London 2015) Production Team
- Yarico (London Theatre Workshop, Fulham 2015) Production Team with John and Jodie Kidd
- Grand Hotel (Southwark Playhouse, Southwark, London 2015) Production Team
- Dogfight In Concert (St James Theatre, West End, London 2015) Production Team
- The Tinderbox (Charing Cross Theatre, West End, London 2015) Graphic Designer
- Piaf (Charing Cross Theatre, West End, London 2015) Graphic Designer
- Grey Gardens (Southwark Playhouse, Southwark, London 2016) Production Team
- In The Bar Of A Tokyo Hotel (Charing Cross Theatre, West End, London 2016) Graphic Designer
- Titanic (Charing Cross Theatre, West End, London 2016) Production Team
- Brazil (New Town Theatre, Edinburgh Fringe 2016) Graphic Designer
- Allegro (Southwark Playhouse, Southwark, London 2016) Production Team
- Radio Times (Charing Cross Theatre, West End, London 2016) Production Team
- Ragtime (Charing Cross Theatre, West End, London 2016) Production Team
- O Come, All Ye Divas (Charing Cross Theatre, West End, London 2016) Production Team
- Death Takes A Holiday (Charing Cross Theatre, West End, London 2016) Production Team
- Chinese Whispers (Greenwich Theatre, Greenwich, London 2016) Producer
- Mother Courage And Her Children (Southwark Playhouse, Southwark, London 2017) Production Team
- Le Grand Mort (Trafalgar Studios, West End, London 2017) Production Team
