= David Paul West =

British theatre and film actor

David Paul West is a British theatre and film actor. He was born in Thornaby-on-Tees and trained at the Academy Drama School in London.

== Career ==
In 1998, David was the voice of Audrey II in the Lost Theatre production of Little Shop of Horrors. He created the role of Kevin in the original production of Patrick Wilde's What's Wrong with Angry? (2002) and went on to play the lead at Europride in Copenhagen. Other stage work includes Axel in Woody Allen's play Don't Drink The Water, David in Matt Ian Kelly's However Do You Want Me at the Hen and Chickens (City Lights Theatre Company, 2004), and Kevin in You Couldn't Make It Up at the Gilded Balloon, Edinburgh and the New End Theatre, Hampstead. He has also toured with the comedy sketch show The Gaydar Diaries, which played at the Pleasance, both in Edinburgh and London. In 2006, he played the evil Leopold alongside "Tomboy Maria" Abi Finley in Tim Rice's Blondel at the Pleasance, Islington.

He also found time to be anchorman for the vodcasts of theatre review site, Broadway Baby.

His film work includes Richard in Get Real (Paramount Classics 1998) and Toby in Things to Do Before You're 30 (Momentum 2004).

== Selected stage and screen credits ==
=== Theatre ===
- Macbeth (title role), The Academy (1993)
- Animal Farm (Old Major), The Academy (1993)
- What's Wrong with Angry? (Kevin), Wild Justice Company (1994)
- A Christmas Carol (Bob Cratchit), The Globe Players (1994)
- What's Wrong with Angry? (Kevin), Wild Justice Company (1996)
- What's Wrong with Angry? (Steven Carter), Copenhagen Europride (1996)
- Loot (Hal), Wild Justice Company (1998)
- Little Shop of Horrors (The Voice of Audrey II), Lost Theatre Company (1998)
- Don't Drink the Water (lead), (1999)
- You Couldn't Make It Up (Kevin), Wild Justice Company, Edinburgh (2002)
- You Couldn't Make It Up (Kevin), Wild Justice Company, London (2003)
- However Do You Want Me? (David), City Lights Theatre Company (2004)
- The Gaydar Diaries (Performer), City Lights Theatre Company (2006)
- Blondel (Leopold), Tim Rice & The Wild Justice Company (2006)

=== Film ===
- Get Real (Richard, the Bridegroom), Paramount Classics (1998)
- Things to Do Before You're 30 (Toby), Momentum (2006)

=== Television ===
- Llety Piod (Magpie's Home) (Jack), Premiere Cymru Wales (1995)
