= Blondel de Nesle =

French trouvère

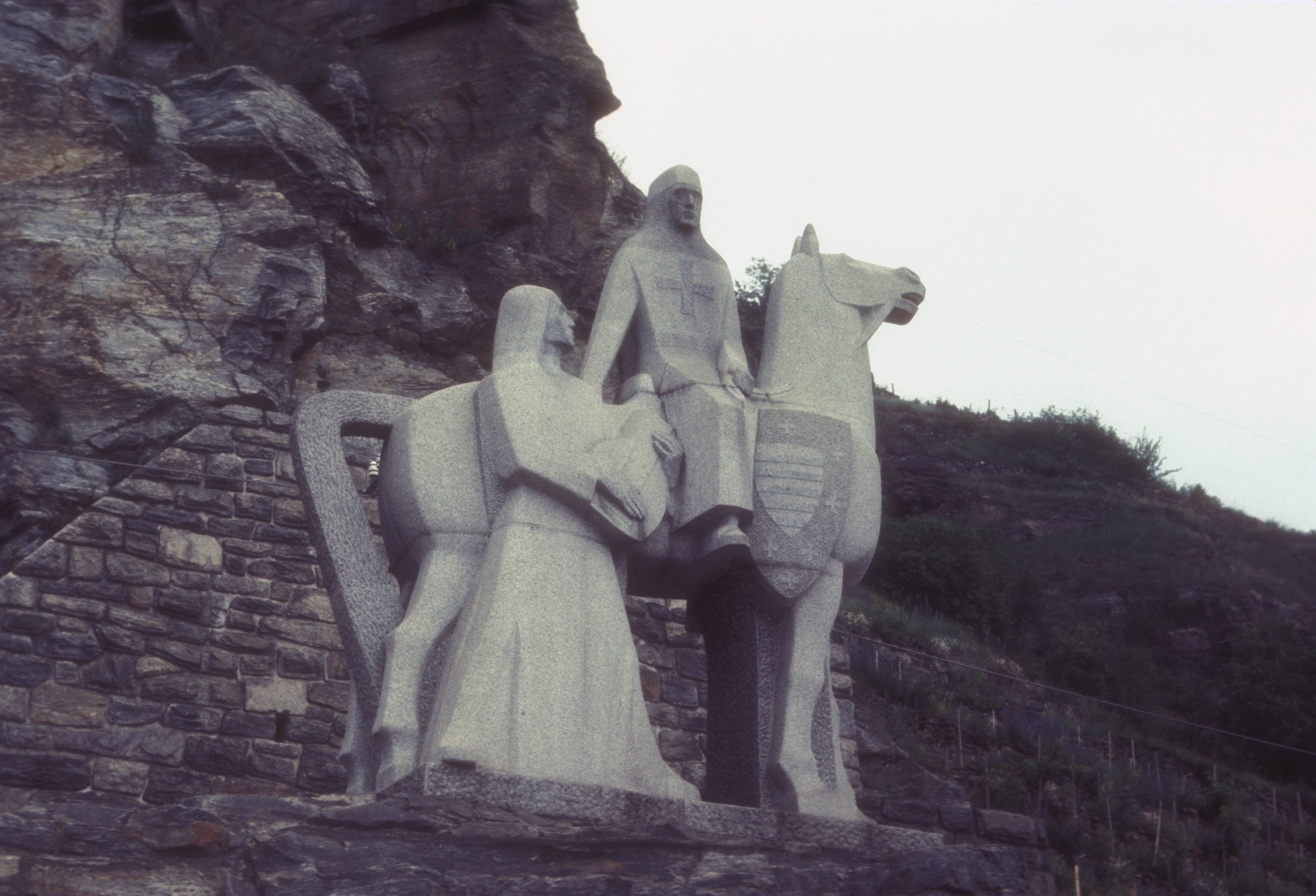
Statue of Blondel near Dürnstein

Blondel de Nesle (French pronunciation: [blɔ̃dɛl də nɛl]) – either Jean I of Nesle (c. 1155 – 1202) or his son Jean II of Nesle (died 1241) – was a French trouvère.

== History ==
The name 'Blondel de Nesle' is attached to twenty-four or twenty-five courtly songs. He was identified in 1942, by Holger Dyggve, as Jean II of Nesle (near Amiens), who was nicknamed 'Blondel' for his long blond hair. He married at the time of his father's death in 1202, and that same year, went on the Fourth Crusade; he later fought in the Albigensian Crusade. However, in 1994, Yvan Lepage suggested that the poet may have been Jean I, father of Jean II, who was Lord of Nesle from 1180 to 1202; this Jean took part in the Third Crusade, which may explain the subsequent legend linking him with King Richard I of England. It is not known for certain if 'Blondel' is indeed a nickname and some authors are far from convinced that Jean I of Nesle or his son are the real Blondel. The situation is made worse by the loss of records which may have helped solve the problem.

If the works are correctly identified and dated, he was a significant influence on his European contemporaries, who made much use of his melodies. The melody of "L'amours dont sui espris" is used in Carmina Burana, for the song "Procurans Odium".

== Legend ==
=== Minstrel of Reims's tale ===
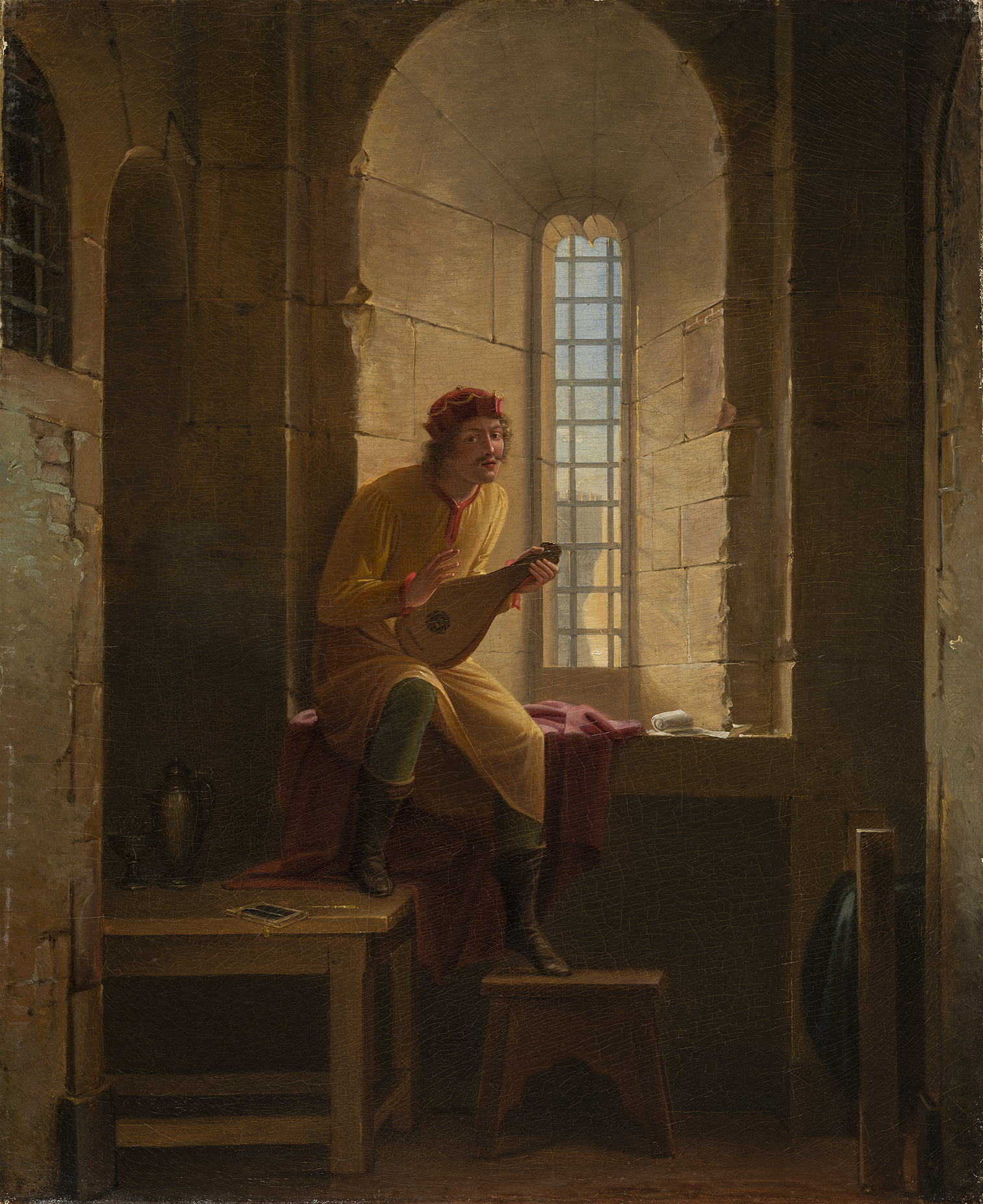
Jean Antoine Laurent, Richard the Lionheart Answers Blondel de Nesle's Singing, 1822 (Stockholm, Nationalmuseum)

By 1260, Blondel's name had become attached to a legend in the highly fictionalised Récits d'un Ménestrel de Reims; this claimed that, after King Richard of England was arrested and held for ransom in 1192, he was found by the minstrel Blondel, whom he saw from his window, and to whom he sang a verse of a song they both knew. Later versions of the story related that Blondel went from castle to castle, singing a particular song that only he and Richard knew, and that the imprisoned Richard replied with the second verse – thus identifying where he was imprisoned. Then, Blondel either aided the king's escape or reported his position back to his friends. Blondel finally found Richard at Dürnstein; in fact, there was no mystery about Richard's location which was widely publicized by his ransomers. (Note: The story is similar to the legend attached to the kidnapping and rescue of Ela Longespée, heiress to the earldom of Salisbury, in 1196.)

'Blondel' is a common surname in Normandy, including on the Channel Islands. It is recorded that King Richard granted a fief on the island Guernsey to a vassal named Blondel, but it remains uncertain as to whether this has any connection with the legend, or whether the legend has any connection with the known trouvère.

=== Modern versions ===
The legend of Blondel did not achieve great popularity in the Middle Ages, but was taken up in the late eighteenth century. It was the basis of André Ernest Modeste Grétry's opera Richard Coeur-de-lion (1784). In 1822, Eleanor Anne Porden used the legend in her epic poem Cœur De Lion: in her version, Blondel is really Richard's wife, Berengaria of Navarre, in disguise.

A poem by Johann Gabriel Seidl titled "Blondels Lied" was set to music by Robert Schumann (1840).

Throughout the nineteenth century, the legend became a key component in the mythology surrounding Richard. Some later twentieth century novelists, placed a homosexual interpretation on his supposed relationship with the king. Norah Lofts in The Lute Player (1951) has Richard make a (rather gentlemanly) approach to Blondel, which is refused, Blondel's heart and devotion being entirely given to Richard's neglected wife Berengaria.

In the 1962–63 ITV British television series Richard the Lionheart, Blondel was a semi-regular character, played by Iain Gregory.

The legend inspired Blondel, a 1983 musical by Stephen Oliver and Tim Rice. The play, a comedic rock opera, is set during the period of the Third Crusade. Blondel is portrayed as a frustrated artist, seeking fame as a composer and performer, even as he searches for his imprisoned monarch. Rice collaborated with director Patrick Wilde to revive the show at the Pleasance Theatre in London in 2006.

== References in popular culture ==
- Blondel features as one of the main characters in the novel Overtime (1993) by English author Tom Holt.
- Blondel is also the protagonist of the novel A Search for the King (1950) by Gore Vidal.
- In John Jakes' 1977 novel King's Crusader, Blondel is on a quest to find his friend and master, Richard the Lion-Hearted. Set in the time of the Third Crusade.
- The Outlaw series (2009–) by Angus Donald identifies Blondel with Alan-a-Dale, follower of Robin Hood.
- Blondel is the main character of the 1983 musical of the same name.
- The English acoustic band of the early 1970s, Amazing Blondel, was named after Blondel.
- A stylized version of Blondel, appears in the 1995 BBC documentary series Crusades.

== Sources ==
- Paris, Louis (ed.), La Chronique De Rains (Récits d'un ménestrel de Reims), 1837, available at Gallica.
- Boyle, David, Blondel's Song, 2005, ISBN 0-670-91486-X (an attempt to prove the legend)
- Dyggve, Holger Petersen, Trouvères Et Protecteurs Des Trouvères Dans Les Cours Seigneuriales De France, 1942.
- Gillingham, John, Richard Coeur De Lion: Kingship, Chivalry and War In the Twelfth Century, 1994, ISBN 1-85285-084-1
- Lepage, Yvan G., Blondel De Nesle. L'Œuvre Lyrique, 1994.
- Nelson, Janet L. (ed.) Richard Coeur De Lion an History and Myth, 1992, ISBN 0-9513085-6-4
- Rosenberg, Samuel N. & Tischler, Hans (ed.), Chanter M'Estuet: Songs of the Trouvères, 1981, ISBN 0-571-10042-2

== Bibliography ==
- In 1862 Prosper Tarbé published an edition including 34 songs attributed to Blondel.
- Récits d'un Ménestrel de Reims. Edition Natalis de Wailly. Paris 1876
