= Chlotrudis Award for Best Actor =

Annual US film award

- Awarded for: Best Actor
- Location: United States
- First award: 1995; 28 years ago
- Currently held by: Paul Mescal for Aftersun
- Website: chlotrudis.org

The Chlotrudis Award for Best Actor is an annual award presented by the Chlotrudis Society for Independent Films, a non-profit organization, founded in 1994, that recognizes achievements in independent and world cinema. The awards were first presented in 1995, and were named after founder Michael Colford and his boyfriend Trent's two cats, Chloe and Gertrudis.

== Winners and nominees ==
=== 1990s ===
Year	Actor	Character	Film
1995 (1st)
1995 (1st)	Morgan Freeman (TIE)	Ellis Boyd "Red" Redding	The Shawshank Redemption
1995 (1st)	Wallace Shawn (TIE)	Vanya	Vanya on 42nd Street
1995 (1st)	Tom Hanks	Forrest Gump	Forrest Gump
1995 (1st)	Samuel L. Jackson	Jules Winnfield	Pulp Fiction
1995 (1st)	Tim Robbins	Andy Dufresne	The Shawshank Redemption
1996 (2nd)
1996 (2nd)	Sean Penn	Matthew Poncelet	Dead Man Walking
1996 (2nd)	Nicolas Cage	Ben	Leaving Las Vegas
1996 (2nd)	Martin Donovan	Thomas	Amateur
1996 (2nd)	Harvey Keitel	Auggie Wren	Smoke
1996 (2nd)	Ian McKellen	Richard III	Richard III
1996 (2nd)	Jonathan Pryce	Lytton Strachey	Carrington
1996 (2nd)	Linus Roache	Father Greg Pilkington	Priest
1997 (3rd)
1997 (3rd)	Billy Bob Thornton	Karl Childers	Sling Blade
1997 (3rd)	Chris Cooper	Sam Deeds	Lone Star
1997 (3rd)	Jeff Daniels	Thomas Alden	Fly Away Home
1997 (3rd)	William H. Macy	Jerry Lundegaard	Fargo
1997 (3rd)	Tony Shalhoub	Primo	Big Night
1997 (3rd)	Noah Taylor	Young David Helfgott	Shine
1998 (4th)
1998 (4th)	Russell Crowe	Bud White	L.A. Confidential
1998 (4th)	Johnny Depp	Joe Pistone / Donnie Brasco	Donnie Brasco
1998 (4th)	Martin Donovan	Martyn Wyatt	Hollow Reed
1998 (4th)	Al Pacino	Lefty Ruggierio	Donnie Brasco
1998 (4th)	Guy Pearce	Ed Exley	L.A. Confidential
1998 (4th)	Koji Yakusho	Shohei Sugiyama	Shall We Dance
1999 (5th)
1999 (5th)	Ian McKellen	James Whale	Gods and Monsters
1999 (5th)	Evan Adams	Thomas Builds-the-Fire	Smoke Signals
1999 (5th)	Roberto Benigni	Guido Orefice	Life is Beautiful
1999 (5th)	Danny DeVito	Pat Francato	Living Out Loud
1999 (5th)	Stephen Fry	Oscar Wilde	Wilde
1999 (5th)	Nick Nolte	Wade Whitehouse	Affliction
1999 (5th)	Edward Norton	Derek Vinyard	American History X

=== 2000s ===
Year	Actress	Character	Film
2000 (6th)
2000 (6th)	Kevin Spacey	Lester Burnham	American Beauty
2000 (6th)	Matthew Broderick	Jim McAllister	Election
2000 (6th)	Rupert Everett	Lord Arthur Goring	An Ideal Husband
2000 (6th)	Richard Farnsworth	Alvin Straight	The Straight Story
2000 (6th)	Bob Hoskins	Joseph Ambrose Hilditch	Felicia's Journey
2000 (6th)	Don McKellar	Patrick Wheeler	Last Night
2000 (6th)	Jason Schwartzmann	Max Fischer	Rushmore
2000 (6th)	Ben Silverstone	Steven Carter	Get Real
2001 (7th)
2001 (7th)	Christian Bale	Patrick Bateman	American Psycho
2001 (7th)	Daniel Auteuil	Gabor	Girl on the Bridge
2001 (7th)	Jamie Bell	Billy Elliot	Billy Elliot
2001 (7th)	Dan Futterman	Charlie	Urbania
2001 (7th)	Denis Lavant	Galoup	Beau Travail
2001 (7th)	Daniel McIvor	Robert	The Five Senses
2001 (7th)	Sean Penn	Emmett Ray	Sweet and Lowdown
2001 (7th)	Mark Ruffalo	Terry Prescott	You Can Count on Me
2001 (7th)	Mike White	Buck	Chuck and Buck
2002 (8th)
2002 (8th)	John Cameron Mitchell	Hedwig	Hedwig and the Angry Inch
2002 (8th)	Daniel Auteuil	Jean	The Widow of St. Pierre
2002 (8th)	Javier Bardem	Reinaldo Arenas	Before Night Falls
2002 (8th)	Robert Forster	Eddie Miller	Diamond Men
2002 (8th)	Tony Leung	Mr. Chow	In the Mood for Love
2002 (8th)	Billy Bob Thornton	Ed Crane	The Man Who Wasn't There
2002 (8th)	Tom Wilkinson	Dr. Matt Fowler	In the Bedroom
2002 (8th)	Ray Winstone	Gal	Sexy Beast
2003 (9th)
2003 (9th)	Jake Gyllenhaal	Donnie Darko	Donnie Darko
2003 (9th)	Gael García Bernal	Julio Zapato	Y tu mamá también
2003 (9th)	Nicolas Cage	Charlie / Donald Kaufman	Adaptation
2003 (9th)	Anthony LaPaglia	Leon Zat	Lantana
2003 (9th)	Lin Cui	Guo Liangui	Beijing Bicycle
2003 (9th)	Adam Sandler	Barry Egan	Punch Drunk Love
2003 (9th)	Stellan Skarsgård	Tomas	Aberdeen
2003 (9th)	James Spader	Mr. Grey	Secretary
2004 (10th)
2004 (10th)	Philip Seymour Hoffman	Dan Mahowny	Owning Mahowny
2004 (10th)	Javier Bardem	Det. Lt. Agustín Rejas	The Dancer Upstairs
2004 (10th)	Bruce Campbell	Elvis	Bubba Ho-Tep
2004 (10th)	Peter Dinklage	Finbar McBride	The Station Agent
2004 (10th)	Paul Giamatti	Harvey Pekar	American Splendor
2004 (10th)	Bill Murray	Bill Harris	Lost in Translation
2004 (10th)	Campbell Scott	David Hurst	The Secret Lives of Dentists
2005 (11th)
2005 (11th)	Gael García Bernal	Ángel / Juan / Zahara	Bad Education
2005 (11th)	Tony Leung	Chan Wing Yan	Infernal Affairs
2005 (11th)	Tadanobu Asano	Kenji	Last Life in the Universe
2005 (11th)	Paul Giamatti	Miles Raymond	Sideways
2005 (11th)	Jamie Sives	Wilbur	Wilbur Wants to Kill Himself
2005 (11th)	Kevin Bacon	Walter	The Woodsman
2006 (12th)
2006 (12th)	Philip Seymour Hoffman	Truman Capote	Capote
2006 (12th)	Mathieu Amalric	Ismaël Vuillard	Kings and Queen
2006 (12th)	Romain Duris	Thomas Seyr	The Beat That My Heart Skipped
2006 (12th)	Bruno Ganz	Adolf Hitler	Downfall
2006 (12th)	Heath Ledger	Ennis Del Mar	Brokeback Mountain
2006 (12th)	David Strathairn	Edward R. Murrow	Good Night, and Good Luck
2007 (13th)
2007 (13th)	Vincent Lindon	Marc Thiriez	The Moustache
2007 (13th)	Daniel Auteuil	Georges Laurent	Caché
2007 (13th)	Gael García Bernal	Stéphane Miroux	The Science of Sleep
2007 (13th)	Ryan Gosling	Dan Dunne	Half Nelson
2007 (13th)	Guy Pearce	Charlie Burns	The Proposition
2007 (13th)	Ray Winstone	Captain Stanley	The Proposition
2008 (14th)
2008 (14th)	Daniel Day-Lewis	Daniel Plainview	There Will Be Blood
2008 (14th)	Casey Affleck	Robert Ford	The Assassination of Jesse James by the Coward Robert Ford
2008 (14th)	Ryan Gosling	Lars Lindstrom	Lars and the Real Girl
2008 (14th)	Gordon Pinsent	Grant Anderson	Away From Her
2008 (14th)	Sam Riley	Ian Curtis	Control
2008 (14th)	Philip Seymour Hoffman	Andrew "Andy" Hanson	Before the Devil Knows You're Dead
2009 (15th)
2009 (15th)	Richard Jenkins	Prof. Walter Vale	The Visitor
2009 (15th)	Brendan Gleeson	Ken	In Bruges
2009 (15th)	Jean-Claude Van Damme	Himself	JCVD
2009 (15th)	Sean Penn	Harvey Milk	Milk
2009 (15th)	Mickey Rourke	Randy "The Ram" Robinson	The Wrestler

=== 2010s ===
Year	Actress	Character	Film
2010 (16th)
2010 (16th)	Colin Firth	George	A Single Man
2010 (16th)	Nicolas Cage	Terence McDonagh	Bad Lieutenant: Port of Call New Orleans
2010 (16th)	Jeremy Renner	Sergeant William James	The Hurt Locker
2010 (16th)	Sam Rockwell	Sam Bell	Moon
2010 (16th)	Baard Owe	Odd Horetn	O'Horten
2011 (17th)
2011 (17th)	Ryan Gosling (TIE)	Dean	Blue Valentine
2011 (17th)	Philip Seymour Hoffman (TIE)	Jack	Jack Goes Boating
2011 (17th)	Alexander Siddig	Tarek Khalifa	Cairo Time
2011 (17th)	Colin Firth	George VI	The King's Speech
2011 (17th)	Vincent Cassel	Jacques Mesrine	Mesrine: Killer Instinct
2011 (17th)	Anthony Mackie	Marcus Washington	Night Catches Us
2012 (18th)
2012 (18th)	Michael Shannon	Curtis	Take Shelter
2012 (18th)	Javier Bardem	Uxbal	Biutiful
2012 (18th)	Tom Cullen	Russell	Weekend
2012 (18th)	Jean Dujardin	George Valentin	The Artist
2012 (18th)	Chris New	Glen	Weekend
2012 (18th)	Stellan Skarsgård	Ulrik	A Somewhat Gentle Man
2013 (19th)
2013 (19th)	John Hawkes	Mark O'Brien	The Sessions
2013 (19th)	Frank Langella	Frank	Robot and Frank
2013 (19th)	Denis Lavant	Mr. Oscar	Holy Motors
2013 (19th)	Peter Mullan	Joseph	Tyrannosaur
2013 (19th)	Matthias Schoenaerts	Jacky Vanmarsenille	Bullhead
2013 (19th)	Matthias Schoenaerts	Alain van Versch	Rust and Bone
2014 (20th)
2014 (20th)	Mads Mikkelsen	Lucas	The Hunt
2014 (20th)	Gael García Bernal	René Saavedra	No
2014 (20th)	Paul Eenhoorn	Martin Bonner	This is Martin Bonner
2014 (20th)	Toby Jones	Gilderoy	Berberian Sound Studio
2014 (20th)	Daniel Radcliffe	Allen Ginsberg	Kill Your Darlings
2014 (20th)	Miles Teller	Sutter	The Spectacular Now
2015 (21st)
2015 (21st)	Tom Hardy	Ivan Locke	Locke
2015 (21st)	Michael Keaton	Riggan	Birdman
2015 (21st)	Jesse Eisenberg	Simon / James	The Double
2015 (21st)	Masaharu Fukuyama	Ryota Nonomiya	Like Father, Like Son
2015 (21st)	Adam Bakri	Omar	Omar
2015 (21st)	Miles Teller	Andrew	Whiplash
2016 (22nd)
2016 (22nd)	Christopher Abbott	James White	James White
2016 (22nd)	Jason Segel	David Foster Wallace	The End of the Tour
2016 (22nd)	Paul Dano	Brian Wilson	Love & Mercy
2016 (22nd)	Oscar Isaac	Abel Morales	A Most Violent Year
2016 (22nd)	Jemaine Clement	Will Henry	People Places Things
2016 (22nd)	Bruce Greenwood	Rene Bartlett	Wildlike
2017 (23rd)
2017 (23rd)	Joel Edgerton	Richard Loving	Loving
2017 (23rd)	Casey Affleck	Lee Chandler	Manchester by the Sea
2017 (23rd)	Vincent Lindon	Thierry Taugourdeau	The Measure of a Man
2017 (23rd)	Viggo Mortensen	Ben	Captain Fantastic
2017 (23rd)	Theo Taplitz	Jake Jardine	Little Men
2018 (24th)
2018 (24th)	Timothée Chalamet	Elio	Call Me By Your Name
2018 (24th)	Adam Driver	Paterson	Paterson
2018 (24th)	Sam Elliott	Lee Hayden	The Hero
2018 (24th)	Nelsan Ellis	Mack Burns	Little Boxes
2018 (24th)	Ethan Hawke	Everett Lewis	Maudie
2018 (24th)	Harry Dean Stanton	Lucky	Lucky
2019 (25th)
2019 (25th)	Alessandro Nivola	Joel	Weightless
2019 (25th)	Ethan Hawke	Toller	First Reformed
2019 (25th)	Charlie Plummer	Charley	Lean on Pete
2019 (25th)	Ben Foster	Will	Leave No Trace
2019 (25th)	Brady Jandreau	Brady Blackburn	The Rider

=== 2020s ===
Year	Actress	Character	Film
2020 (26th)
2020 (26th)	Matthias Schoenaerts	Roman	The Mustang
2020 (26th)	Jimmie Fails	Jimmie Fails	The Last Black Man in San Francisco
2020 (26th)	Kelvin Harrison Jr.	Luce Edgar	Luce
2020 (26th)	Antonio Banderas	Salvador Mallo	Pain and Glory
2020 (26th)	Jonathan Pryce	Pope Francis	The Two Popes
2021 (27th)
2021 (27th)	Riz Ahmed (TIE)	Ruben	Sound of Metal
2021 (27th)	Levan Gelbakhiani (TIE)	Merab	And Then We Danced
2021 (27th)	John Boyega	Leroy Lindo	Red, White and Blue
2021 (27th)	Delroy Lindo	Paul	Da 5 Bloods
2021 (27th)	John Magaro	Cookie	First Cow
2021 (27th)	Mads Mikkelsen	Martin	Another Round
2022 (28th)
2022 (28th)	Benedict Cumberbatch	Phil Burbank	The Power of the Dog
2022 (28th)	Nicolas Cage	The Janitor	Willy's Wonderland
2022 (28th)	Amir El-Masry	Omar	Limbo
2022 (28th)	Udo Kier	Pat Pitsenbarger	Swan Song
2022 (28th)	Luke Kirby	Ted Bundy	No Man of God
2022 (28th)	Alec Utgoff	Zhenia	Never Gonna Snow Again
2023 (29th)
2023 (29th)	Paul Mescal	Callum	Aftersun
2023 (29th)	Adeel Akhtar	Ali	Ali & Ava
2023 (29th)	Franz Rogowski	Hans Hoffman	Great Freedom
2023 (29th)	Christopher Abbott	Kevin	On the Count of Three
2023 (29th)	Tim Roth	Neil Bennett	Sundown

== Multiple awards and nominations ==
Actors who have been nominated multiple times

Awards	Nominations	Recipient
3	4	Philip Seymour Hoffman
1	4	Gael García Bernal
1	3	Ryan Gosling
1	3	Sean Penn
1	2	Billy Bob Thornton
1	2	Christopher Abbott
1	2	Colin Firth
1	2	Ian McKellen
1	2	Mads Mikkelsen
1	2	Matthias Schoenaerts
1	2	Vincent Lindon
0	4	Nicolas Cage
0	3	Daniel Auteuil
0	3	Javier Bardem
0	2	Casey Affleck
0	2	Denis Lavant
0	2	Ethan Hawke
0	2	Guy Pearce
0	2	Jonathan Pryce
0	2	Martin Donovan
0	2	Miles Teller
0	2	Paul Giamatti
0	2	Ray Winstone
0	2	Stellan Skarsgård
0	2	Tony Leung
