= Sandel (novel) =

- Author: Angus John Mackintosh Stewart
- Language: English
- Genre: Drama
- Publisher: Hutchinson
- Publication date: 1968
- Publication place: United Kingdom
- Pages: 256
- ISBN: 9780090860203

Sandel is a novel by Angus Stewart. It was published by Hutchinson in 1968.

The novel tells the story of choir boy Tony Sandel and college undergraduate David. A play adaptation of the novel by Glenn Chandler was performed in 2013.
