= Ben Silverstone =

English barrister and former actor

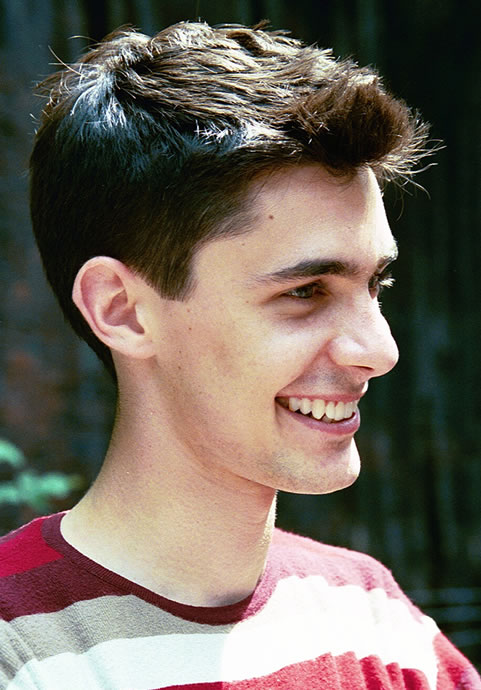
- Ben Silverstone in 2001
- Born: Benjamin Maurice Silverstone; 9 April 1979 (age 47); Camden, London, England, UK
- Education: Trinity College, Cambridge (BA); London School of Economics (LLM)
- Occupations: Barrister; former actor
- Years active: 1994–2007 (as actor)
- Website: http://www.bensilverstone.net

Benjamin Maurice Silverstone (born 9 April 1979) is an English barrister and former actor. Silverstone appeared in the 1998 Paramount Classics feature film, Get Real.

== Early life and education ==
Silverstone was born in Camden, London, the son of Beverly and Anthony Silverstone. He has one sister and one brother. He studied English at Trinity College, Cambridge, and law (LLM) at the London School of Economics.

== Acting career ==
Prior to Get Real, Silverstone appeared in Adrian Lyne's adaptation of Lolita in 1997 and Mike Figgis' The Browning Version in 1994. Get Real was based on Patrick Wilde's stage play What's Wrong with Angry?, and is a love story between two British schoolboys. Silverstone made the front cover of Gay Times in May 1999 to mark the release of the film.

The film achieved cult status with many fans, and even gave rise to two fan-organised gatherings in the filming locations around Basingstoke. The events in themselves attracted the attention of the television media, as fans of the film travelled several thousand miles to the event.

Immediately after the release of Get Real, Silverstone went to Cambridge University. While there, he acted in student productions of King Lear, The Whiteheaded Boy, The Duchess of Malfi, The Resistible Rise of Arturo Ui, Near Miss and The Winter's Tale. In his first term at Cambridge, Silverstone was initially cast as Lieutenant Yolland in the ADC Theatre production of the Brian Friel play "Translations": however, he turned the part down, and was replaced with another Cambridge freshman, Tom Hiddleston. His involvement in student theatre at Cambridge also overlapped with Oscar winner Eddie Redmayne.

Since 2001, Silverstone has appeared in numerous stage productions such as The Tempest and My Boy Jack and was nominated for both a The Times Theatre Award and an Evening Standard Theatre Award for his portrayal of Basil Anthony in the West End production of Man and Boy

His most recent film project is Jump! (2007), in which he starred as a young Jewish photographer charged with the murder of his father, based on the real-life story of Philippe Halsman, opposite Patrick Swayze and Martine McCutcheon.

== Law career ==
Silverstone left Cambridge in 2001 with a first class degree. He was called to the bar in 2009. As of December 2023, Silverstone works at Matrix Chambers. That firm lists him as a specialist in media and information, data protection and public law.

In May 2025, Silverstone asked the High Court to dismiss a lawsuit by an Afghan man against The Guardian and Guardian Media Group, who accused the newspaper of using his image to illustrate a note about the murder of Hamed Sabouri in Afghanistan. Silverstone said that the article was not defamatory and did not harm the man's reputation.

== Selected credits ==
=== Theatre ===
- The Age of Consent (Timmy), Edinburgh Fringe (2001)
- The Age of Consent (Timmy), Bush Theatre, London (2002)
- The Lady's Not For Burning (Richard), Chichester Festival Theatre (2002)
- The Tempest (Ariel), UK Tour (2002)
- Electra (Orestes), The Gate Theatre, London (2003)
- My Boy Jack (Jack Kipling), UK Tour (2004)
- Man and Boy (Basil Anthony), UK Tour (2004)
- Man and Boy (Basil Anthony), Duchess Theatre, London (2005)

=== Film ===
- The Browning Version (Taplow), dir. Mike Figgis (1994)
- Lolita (Young Humbert), dir. Adrian Lyne (1997)
- Get Real (Steven Carter), dir. Simon Shore (1998)
- Jump! (Philippe Halsman), dir. Joshua Sinclair (2007)

=== Television ===
- Shackleton (Young Applicant), Channel 4 (2001)
- Timewatch: Through Hell for Hitler (Henry Metalmann), BBC2 (2003)
- Doctors (Joe Nyland), BBC1 (2003)

=== Radio ===
- Phobos (Drew), BBC 7 (2007)
