= 1st Golden Trailer Awards =

1st annual award show

- Date: 21 September 1999
- Site: New York City
- Hosted by: Todd Newton
- Most wins: Philip R. Daccord (6)
- Most nominations: Philip R. Daccord (8)

The 1st Golden Trailer Awards (GTAs) were held on 21 September 1999 in New York City, to honor the best in film promotion. The jury for the inaugural awards consisted of Quentin Tarantino, Stephen Woolley, Larry Meistrich, Jeff Kleeman, David Kaminow, Stefan Jonas, Anna Luiza Muller, and Silvia Ruth. It was hosted by Todd Newton in front of a live audience of 350 and broadcast over the Internet. Submissions consisted of trailers for films between January 1998 and December 1999.

== Background ==
The Golden Trailers were created by Evelyn Brady, Monica Brady, and Esther Bell in order to properly represent the hard working people who work in film marketing, who are not honored by the Academy of Motion Picture Arts and Sciences.

== List of winners and nominees ==
Winners at the top and in bold.

Best Action Trailer	Most Original Trailer
**The Matrix** **Philip R. Daccord**; Star Wars: Episode I – The Phantom Menace Jim Ward · Mark Mrnka; Blade Justin King Hall · Frank Chiocchi	**Run Lola Run** **Jonathan Glen** · **Edward Glass** · **Barry Schoor**; The Blair Witch Project Jon Epstein · John Hegeman; The Minus Man Rocky Morton · Hampton Fancher · Paul Speaker · Cliff Freeman; The Messenger: The Story of Joan of Arc Imaginary Forces
Best Edit	Best Trailer in Show
**The Matrix** **Philip R. Daccord**; Blade Justin King Hall · Frank Chiocchi; Bringing Out The Dead Chris Kentis	**The Matrix** **Philip R. Daccord**; Austin Powers: The Spy Who Shagged Me Tommy Gargotta; Bringing Out The Dead Chris Kentis
Best Trailer of the Decade	Best Comedy Trailer
**Se7en** **Paul Vincent**; Pulp Fiction Ron Auerbach; Dumb and Dumber Jim Hale · Tim Nett; Face/Off Justin King Hall · Frank Chiocchi; Fargo David Schneiderman · Kevin Sewelson	**Austin Powers: The Spy Who Shagged Me (Trailer #1)** **Tommy Gargotta** · **Doug Dezanni** · **Tim Nett**; Analyze This Philip R. Daccord; Austin Powers: The Spy Who Shagged Me (Trailer #2) Tommy Gargotta · Doug Dezanni · Tim Nett; Holy Man Bill Berg-Hillinger · Jeff Myers
Best Art and Commerce	Best Music
**The Matrix** **Philip R. Daccord**; Xiu Xiu: The Sent Down Girl Keith Gilman; Buffalo '66 Richard Picker	**Out of Sight** **Paul Vincent**; Run Lola Run Jonathan Glen · Edward Glass · Barry Schoor; Swing Michael Thibault · Harley Rinzler · Jigo Reed
Best Drama Trailer	Trashiest Trailer
**Good Will Hunting** **Angie Speranza**; Tea with Mussolini David Schneiderman · Kevin Sewelson; Jakob the Liar David Schneiderman · Kevin Sewelson	**Cruel Intentions** **Diane DeWarren** · **Arty Pearson**; Cousin Bette Kathy Kuchta; Detroit Rock City Bill Neil · Dave Yerxa
Best Foreign Trailer	Best Horror/Thriller Trailer
**Three Seasons** **Stephen Garrett** · **Victor Fanucchi** · **James Brookman**; Xiu Xiu: The Sent Down Girl Keith Gilman; Lucie Aubrac Stephen Garrett · Victor Fanucchi · James Brookman	**The Blair Witch Project** **Jon Epstein** · **John Hegeman**; A Perfect Murder Chris Kentis; I Still Know What You Did Last Summer Dan Gross · Arty Pearson
Best Voiceover	The Dark and Stormy Night Award
**The Blair Witch Project** (Trailer #1) **Jon Epstein** · **John Hegeman**; The Beach Emmett Malloy · Steve Hull; Bringing Out The Dead Chris Kentis	**8mm** **Philip R. Daccord**; Snow Falling on Cedars Benedict Coulter · Tim Nett · Jim Hale; The Mask of Zorro Philip R. Daccord
Best Trailer with No Budget	Best Animation/Family Trailer
**Return of the Masterminds** **Bobby Maruvada**; Get Real Eric Archer · Mark Pierce; Apocalypse II: Revelation Cameron Campbell · Scott Machens	**A Bug's Life** **Mark Lowrie** · **Frederico F. Tio**; Mr. Magoo Duke Kullman · Jeff Myers; Inspector Gadget Duke Kullman · Jeff Myers
Golden Fleece Award	Best Documentary Trailer
**8mm** **Philip R. Daccord**; Armageddon Mike Greenberg · Tim Nett · Jile Hale · Benedict Coulter; Jane Austen's Mafia Ed Graff · Craig Murray	**Return with Honor** **Stuart Robinson** · **James Brookman**; Buena Vista Social Club Shawn Turner · Roland Mesa · John Long; Unmade Beds Dick Gordon · Sean DiSimone
Best Romance Trailer
**Great Expectations** **Diane DeWarren** · **Frank Chiocchi**; Prague Duet Marcy Levitas Hamilton · Strath Hamilton; Ever After Emmett Malloy · Steve Hull

== See also ==
- 1998 in film
- 1999 in film
- 70th Academy Awards
- 51st BAFTA Film Awards
- 56th Golden Globe Awards
