= Angus John Mackintosh Stewart =

British writer

- Born: 22 November 1936; Adelaide, Australia
- Died: 14 July 1998 (aged 61); Fawler, England
- Relatives: J. I. M. Stewart (Father)
- Writing career
- Language: English
- Genre: Gay
- Notable work: Sandel

Angus John Mackintosh Stewart (22 November 1936 – 14 July 1998) was a British writer, best known for his novel Sandel. He was an accomplished portrait photographer. For much of his life he suffered from clinical depression.

== Early life and education ==
Stewart was the third child of the novelist and Oxford academic J. I. M. Stewart (1906–1994) and Margaret Hardwick (1905–1979). Shortly after their marriage in 1932, the Stewarts moved to Australia where, from 1935 to 1945, J. I. M. Stewart was Jury Professor of English at the University of Adelaide. Their son Angus was born in Adelaide in 1936. The family returned to England in 1949 when Stewart's father became a Student (Fellow) of Christ Church, Oxford, and Angus was educated at Bryanston School and at his father's college.

== Published works ==
Angus Stewart's first published work was "The Stile", which appeared in The London Magazine (Nov. 1961), and was reprinted with two more of his stories in the Faber & Faber anthology Introduction 2: Stories by New Writers (1964). He won the Richard Hillary Memorial Prize in 1965. His breakthrough came in 1968 with his first novel, Sandel. Set in the pseudonymous St Cecilia's College, Oxford, the book revolves around the unorthodox love between a 19-year-old undergraduate, David Rogers, and a 13-year-old chorister, Antony Sandel. The novel appears to have been based on real events, recounted by Stewart in an article under the pseudonym John Davis in the anthology Underdogs (1961), edited for Weidenfeld & Nicolson by Philip Toynbee. A stage adaptation by the Scottish writer Glenn Chandler was premiered at the Edinburgh Festival in August 2013. After many years out of print, Sandel was republished in August 2013 to coincide with the Edinburgh production.

Stewart also wrote poetry, some of which was published as Sense and Inconsequence (1972), with an introduction by his father's longstanding friend W. H. Auden.

== Residences ==
Before and after Sandel, Stewart lived for long periods in Tangier in Morocco, partly as a project in self-discovery and partly to live and work freely in the writers' community there, along with Paul Bowles, William S Burroughs, Alan Sillitoe, Tennessee Williams and others. This resulted in two further books; a novel entitled Snow in Harvest (1969) and a highly personal true account of his Moroccan experiences between 1962 and 1974, entitled Tangier: A Writer's Notebook (1977). A third, unpublished, novel The Wind Cries All Ways, includes a "startling first-person description of a man's incarceration in a Tangier mental asylum", as claimed in the notes on the author by the publisher of the Sandel rerelease.

== Final years ==
After his mother died in 1979, Stewart returned to England, living for the final twenty years of his life in an annex to his father's home at Fawler, near Oxford.

== Works ==
- Sandel, Hutchinson, 1968. Reissued by Pilot Productions Ltd, 2013, in conjunction with the play adapted by Glenn Chandler.
- Snow in Harvest, Hutchinson, 1969
- Sense and Inconsequence: Satirical Verses, Michael de Hartington, 1972
- Tangier: A Writer's Notebook, Hutchinson, 1977
