= Things to Do Before You're 30 =

- Directed by: Simon Shore
- Written by: Patrick Wilde
- Produced by: Marc Samuelson; Peter Samuelson
- Starring: Billie Piper; Emilia Fox; Dougray Scott; Jimi Mistry; Shaun Parkes
- Distributed by: Momentum Pictures
- Release dates: 16 April 2005 (Switzerland); 2 June 2006 (United Kingdom)
- Running time: 101 minutes
- Country: United Kingdom
- Language: English

Things to Do Before You're 30 is a 2005 British film directed by Simon Shore. Its plot concerns a group of twenty-something friends trying desperately to hang onto the friendship of their youth while the responsibility of adulthood is tearing them in different directions. It was written by Patrick Wilde, based on the 1997 Dutch feature film, All Stars, written by Mischa Alexander and Jean van de Velde.

Things to Do Before You're 30 is set in Greenwich, London with a large ensemble cast including Dougray Scott, Emilia Fox, Billie Piper, Jimi Mistry, Shaun Parkes, Bruce Mackinnon, George Innes, George Irving, Rosie Cavaliero, Nina Young, Danny Nussbaum, David Paul West and Neil McGuinness.

== Plot ==
In 1983 Don Robson started a boys football team called Athletico Greenwich. Twenty years later six of the lads are still playing for the team, but things have become so much more complicated.

Cass, the team's top scorer on and off the pitch, isn't sure he's ready for fatherhood with Kate, the love of his life. Adam still hasn't told the rest of the team he's gay. Colin is desperate to have a threesome even though he's just started going out with the lovely Vicky. Dylan is in love with the woman his father is about to marry. Billy is trying to save his marriage. Johnny (Danny Nussbaum) is not ready to accept the fact that his father, who started the team all those years ago, is dying.

While it is the Sunday football team that keeps this group of friends together, this is not a film about football. This is a film about complex relationships, and how childhood friends have to change as they mature.

== Reception ==
The film premiered at the Cannes Film Festival in 2004, and received largely negative reviews, with Channel 4 Film calling it a "charmless film full of gender clichés and lumpen dialogue," and adding "Not one to put on your 'things to do' list."
