= 8mm (film) =

1999 thriller film by Joel Schumacher

- Theatrical release poster
- Directed by: Joel Schumacher
- Written by: Andrew Kevin Walker
- Produced by: Gavin Polone; Judy Hofflund; Joel Schumacher
- Starring: Nicolas Cage; Joaquin Phoenix; James Gandolfini; Peter Stormare; Anthony Heald
- Cinematography: Robert Elswit
- Edited by: Mark Stevens
- Music by: Mychael Danna
- Production company: Columbia Pictures
- Distributed by: Columbia Pictures
- Release dates: February 19, 1999 (Berlin International Film Festival); February 26, 1999 (United States); April 1, 1999 (Germany)
- Running time: 123 minutes
- Countries: United States; Germany
- Language: English
- Budget: $40 million
- Box office: $96.6 million

8mm is a 1999 crime thriller film directed by Joel Schumacher, written by Andrew Kevin Walker, and starring Nicolas Cage, Joaquin Phoenix, James Gandolfini, Peter Stormare, Anthony Heald, and Catherine Keener. The film follows a private investigator who is hired to research the origins of an alleged snuff film uncovered by the widowed matriarch of a wealthy family.

Despite being selected for the Golden Bear and receiving standing ovations from audiences at the Berlin International Film Festival, the film received mostly negative reviews from critics due to its excessively violent and disturbing content.

== Plot ==
Private investigator Tom Welles is contacted by Daniel Longdale, attorney for wealthy widow Mrs. Christian. While clearing out her recently deceased husband's safe, she and Longdale uncovered an 8mm movie which appears to depict the real murder of a girl. Longdale tries to assuage Mrs. Christian that snuff films are a myth, but she asks for confirmation that the violence depicted is not genuine. Both instruct Welles to keep the investigation a secret.

Scouring missing persons files, Welles discovers the girl is Mary Ann Mathews and visits her mother, Janet, in North Carolina. She allows Welles to search her house, and he finds Mary Ann's diary, in which she details relocating to Hollywood to become a film star. Janet demands that he find out what happened to her daughter.

In Hollywood, aided by streetwise adult video store clerk Max California, Welles infiltrates the world of underground fetish pornography. They find no evidence that a snuff film industry even exists, and their inquiries are met with aggressive denial by sellers. A note left by Mary Ann in a suitcase at the Fred Jordan mission leads Tom to sleazy talent scout Eddie Poole. Upon witnessing Poole's non-verbal reaction to the girl's picture, Welles spies on him and stirs him into contacting an associate, whom Max identifies as New York-based pornographer Dino Velvet. Velvet's violent films often feature a masked man named "Machine", who brutalizes women and resembles the man featured in Mary Ann's movie. Welles and Max travel to New York, posing as clients interested in commissioning a hardcore BDSM film to be directed by Velvet and starring Machine. Velvet seemingly agrees and schedules a meeting.

The meeting turns out to be an ambush, as Longdale and Poole appear and hold Welles at gunpoint. The film is revealed as authentic; Mr. Christian contacted Longdale to procure a snuff film, and being unable to find one, Longdale commissioned one from Velvet and Poole. Velvet and Machine produce a bound and beaten Max, to force Welles to bring them the only surviving copy of the film. As Longdale accompanies Welles to his car to retrieve the film, he admits he just wanted to placate Mrs. Christian with the investigation and never thought Welles would get this far. Welles presses Longdale for a reason why Mr. Christian wanted the film, to which he says simply "because he could." Once Welles returns with the film, Velvet burns it and has Max killed by Machine. As they are about to kill Welles, he reveals that Mr. Christian paid $1 million for the film, of which Longdale secretly kept the major portion. In the ensuing confrontation, Velvet and Longdale kill each other; Welles wounds Machine and barely escapes.

While fleeing the scene, Welles instructs his wife Amy to escape with their infant daughter to a secret location, and informs Mrs. Christian regarding his findings, recommending that she contact the police. Arriving at her estate, he is shocked to hear that after receiving his phone call, she left envelopes for him and the Mathews family and committed suicide. His envelope contains the rest of his payment and a note reading, "Try to forget us."

Deciding to avenge Mary Ann's death, Welles returns to Hollywood, tracks down Poole, and takes him to the shooting location, but stops short of killing him. He calls Janet to tell her about her daughter and asks for her permission to punish those responsible, which she tacitly gives him as she breaks down in tears. With that, he pistol whips Poole to death, burning his body and the pornography from his car. He then attacks Machine at his home and unmasks him, revealing a bespectacled man named George Anthony Higgins, who admits that his sadistic actions are simply done out of pleasure, and are unrelated to any personal trauma. Welles then kills him in the ensuing struggle.

After returning to his family, Welles breaks down in front of Amy, attempting to process all the evil things that he had witnessed throughout the investigation. Months later, he receives a letter from Janet, thanking him and relating her gratitude for the fact that, despite everything, they were the only two people who really cared about Mary Ann.

== Cast ==
- Nicolas Cage as Tom Welles
- Joaquin Phoenix as Max California
- James Gandolfini as Eddie Poole
- Peter Stormare as Dino Velvet
- Anthony Heald as Daniel Longdale
- Myra Carter as Mrs. Christian
- Catherine Keener as Amy Welles
- Norman Reedus as Warren Anderson
- Amy Morton as Janet Mathews
- Jack Betts as Butler
- Torsten Voges as Stick
- Luis Saguar as Manny
- Chris Bauer as George Anthony Higgins / Machine
- Suzy Nakamura as Computer Wizard
- Jenny Powell as Mary Ann Mathews

== Production ==
In May 1997, it was reported Columbia Pictures had acquired the Andrew Kevin Walker-penned 8 Millimeter for $750,000 against $1.25 million. In October 1997, Joel Schumacher was reported to direct with Nicolas Cage and Mark Wahlberg to star. Wahlberg ended up not pursuing the film, and Joaquin Phoenix was cast in December 1997. Russell Crowe was Schumacher's other choice for Cage's role, but the studio went for Cage who was the bigger star at the time.

Principal photography began in February 1998 in Miami, Florida; filming also took place in New York City, and Sony Pictures Studios, Culver City, California.

== Release ==
8mm premiered at the 49th Berlin International Film Festival on February 19, 1999, before premiering in the United States the following week on February 26, 1999.

=== Home media ===
Sony Pictures Home Entertainment released 8mm on DVD on November 22, 2005. A Blu-ray edition was released by Scream Factory on January 8, 2019.

== Reception ==
=== Box office ===
8mm opened in 2,730 theaters in North America and made $14,252,888 in its opening weekend with an average of $6,013 per theater ranking number 1 at the box office. The film made $36,663,315 domestically and $59,955,384 internationally for a total of $96,618,699.

=== Critical response ===
8mm received negative reviews from critics. It has a rating of 23% on review aggregator website Rotten Tomatoes based on 83 reviews with an average rating of 4.3/10. The critical consensus states, "Its sadistic violence is unappealing and is lacking in suspense and mystery." The film also has a score of 21 out of 100 on Metacritic based on 20 reviews indicating "generally unfavorable." Audiences surveyed by CinemaScore gave the film a grade of "C−" on scale of A+ to F.

Derek Elley of Variety criticized the film, stating that "8MM is a movie that keeps jumping the gate and finally unravels all over the floor." Peter Travers for Rolling Stone wrote that the film "aims for a psychological depth that the script can't sustain."

Roger Ebert was one of the film's admirers and gave the film three stars out of four, stating on his website "I know some audience members will be appalled by this film, as many were by Seven. It is a very hard R that would doubtless have been NC-17 if it had come from an indie instead of a big studio with clout. But it is a real film. Not a slick exploitation exercise with all the trappings of depravity but none of the consequences. Not a film where moral issues are forgotten in the excitement of an action climax. Yes, the hero is an ordinary man who finds himself able to handle violent situations, but that's not the movie's point. The last two words of the screenplay are 'save me' and by the time they're said, we know what they mean."

=== Accolades ===
Award/association	Year	Category	Recipient(s) and nominee(s)	Result	Ref.
Berlin International Film Festival	1999	Golden Bear	Joel Schumacher	Nominated	
Golden Trailer Awards	1999	Golden Trailer	8mm	Won	
Golden Trailer Awards	1999	Golden Fleence	8mm	Won	

== Soundtrack ==
The film score was composed by Mychael Danna. It was released on CD by Chapter III in 1999, with a total of 20 tracks:

1. "The Projector" (1:20)
2. "The House" (2:05)
3. "The Call" (1:44)
4. "The Film" (1:10)
5. "Cindy" (0:56)
6. "Missing Persons" (4:46)
7. "What Would You Choose" (3:11)
8. "Hollywood" (2:51)
9. "Unsee" (1:20)
10. "Dance With the Devil" (5:36)
11. "The Third Man" (1:14)
12. "Loft" (1:56)
13. "No Answer" (1:47)
14. "I Know All About..." (1:41)
15. "366 Hoyt Ave." (1:46)
16. "Scene of the Crime" (5:52)
17. "Machine" (3:30)
18. "Rainstorm" (3:49)
19. "Home" (1:32)
20. "Dear Mr. Wells" (1:54)

In addition, while not featured on the soundtrack, the song "Come to Daddy" by Aphex Twin is featured at multiple points in the film.

== See also ==
- 8mm 2
- Hardcore
- The Cutting Room
