= Abi Finley =

British actress (born 1982)

Abigail "Abi" Finley (born 10 September 1982) is an actress and musical theatre performer from Prestwich, Greater Manchester, England, the daughter of a local Jewish performer.

Finley has notably played Fiona in Blondel at the Pleasance Theatre and Serena in Fame on a UK national tour. Since obtaining these leading roles, Finley has been praised for her singing voice and acting skills. Finley first gained national attention for her appearance on the BBC Reality TV programme How Do You Solve A Problem Like Maria? in 2006, where she was known as Tomboy Maria. This was produced by Andrew Lloyd Webber and David Ian to find someone to play Maria von Trapp in The Sound of Music. She appeared on the show with her best friend from college, Aoife Mulholland, and reached the semi-final of the BBC competition; but in a twist of fate she lost out to Mulholland in the sing-off, singing "Any Dream Will Do".

== Career ==
Shortly after How Do You Solve A Problem Like Maria? finished in late 2006, Finley was cast by the Oscar-winning lyricist Sir Tim Rice in his revival of Blondel. On casting Finley, Rice said in an interview with Hello Magazine, "Fiona has to be funny, feisty, and sexy. Plenty of candidates have two of the necessary attributes. Only Abi had all three... when you see Abi on stage, you actually want to look at her. I'd be amazed if Abi is not a big star pretty soon." Geoff Ambler, reviewing Blondel, said of Finley's performance, "Abi Finley, the beautiful and talented one from A Problem like Maria, proves that she can act with confident poise among the best, as well as sing, in what is her professional stage debut. This tight, witty show with its tremendous cast is one of the best to open in London this year."

In early 2007, straight from Blondel, Finley landed the part of Serena in Fame on a UK national tour. She had to audition for the part, then rehearse, while also learning the part of Fiona in Blondel. Ian Pearce, who reviewed the show for the BBC, said, "The first thing that strikes you is the quality of the live band and the sheer exuberance of the dancing... a strong performance comes from Abi Finley as the somewhat dowdy Serena."

On Christmas Eve 2007, Finley was seen performing with Lee Mead and Connie Fisher and some of the other How Do You Solve A Problem Like Maria? and Any Dream Will Do finalists in a BBC special "festive" reunion show called When Joseph met Maria!, celebrating both the hit Andrew Lloyd Webber BBC shows, recorded earlier on 2 December 2007. How Do You Solve A Problem Like Maria? won an international Emmy Award in 2007 for best non-scripted entertainment.

From 6 May 2008, Finley starred as Miranda, the disembodied German head in Betwixt! The Musical. The show opened on 6 May 2008, and ran until 22 June at The King's Head Theatre, Islington.

Finley starred as Jane in Gareth Peter's Bluebird the Musical, a musical set in the Second World War, alongside I'd Do Anything finalist Sarah Lark and Ramin Karimloo. During December 2011 and January 2012, Finley will be appearing in the German production of the tribal-rock musical Hair, in which she plays ensemble and covers the lead role of Sheila.

== Roles ==
- 2008: Miranda in Betwixt! The musical, The King's Head Theatre, Islington
- 2006: Fiona in Blondel at the Pleasance Theatre, Islington.
- Rice was personally involved in casting Finley following her appearance on How Do You Solve A Problem Like Maria?
- Previous roles include Annie in Oklahoma!, Rizzo in Grease, Blousey in Bugsy Malone, Edith in Pirates of Penzance, Calamity Jane in Calamity Jane, and the Narrator in Joseph.

== Education ==
She attended King David Yavneh school in Manchester, then earned a BA (honours) degree in English and Drama at the University of Leeds before going on to complete a master's degree in musical theatre at the Central School of Speech and Drama.

== Personal ==
The singer and actress, originally from Prestwich, now resides in Finchley, London.

Her talent shone from a very early age when she starred in virtually every production that her high school in Manchester, King David Yavneh, put on. From there she went on to study for a degree in English and Drama at the University of Leeds, and her course led to her landing the title role in Calamity Jane and Annie in Oklahoma!. She then studied for a master's degree at the Central School of Speech and Drama in London, where she appeared in productions including A Winter's Tale (as Paulina) and Grease (as Rizzo). This is where she met her best friend, Aoife Mulholland, who was also studying on the same course, and together they decided to audition for How Do You Solve A Problem Like Maria?. In her Hello! Magazine interview, Finley said, "Aoife and I thought we would make a big weekend of it [the BBC audition]... we were like a couple of new kids holding hands in the big school playground."

On her time in How Do You Solve A Problem Like Maria? Finley has said, "It was like a holiday camp and school trip rolled into one. We would sit around the lounge in the evenings watching reality TV and saying how much we hated it. We forgot we were doing it!" And on getting the leading role breaks after How Do You Solve A Problem Like Maria?, "I know it is a cliché, but honestly and truly I am living the dream, doing something I always wanted to do. I have to pinch myself sometimes. I am so lucky to be doing what I love doing on a daily basis – you can't ask for any more."
