= Get Real (film) =

1998 film by Simon Shore

- Theatrical release poster
- Directed by: Simon Shore
- Screenplay by: Patrick Wilde
- Based on: What's Wrong with Angry? by Patrick Wilde
- Produced by: Stephen Taylor
- Starring: Ben Silverstone; Brad Gorton; Charlotte Brittain
- Cinematography: Alan Almond
- Edited by: Barrie Vince
- Music by: John Lunn
- Production companies: Distant Horizon; Graphite Film; British Screen; Arts Council of England
- Distributed by: Paramount Classics (through United International Pictures)
- Release dates: August 1998 (Edinburgh); 14 May 1999 (United Kingdom)
- Running time: 110 minutes
- Country: United Kingdom
- Language: English
- Box office: $1.2 million

Get Real is a 1998 British romantic comedy-drama film directed by Simon Shore, based on the play What's Wrong with Angry? by screenwriter Patrick Wilde. The plot centres around the coming of age of a gay teenage boy while growing up in Britain during the Cool Britannia era of the late 1990s. The film was shot and set in and around Basingstoke, England.

== Plot ==
Steven Carter is an intelligent and introverted 16-year-old middle-class schoolboy in Basingstoke, England, who is secretly gay. Bullied at school and misunderstood by his parents, his only confidante is his best friend and next-door neighbour, Linda. One day, Steven, who occasionally cruises the public toilet in a local park, is surprised to find John Dixon, the school's star athlete, also cruising. John denies that he is gay, but is intrigued by Steven and follows him home while his parents are out. In Steven's bedroom, the two boys nearly kiss until John stops himself, insisting he is not gay, and storms off. The next day at school, John ignores Steven.

At a school dance, Steven watches John dancing with Christina Lindmann, a beautiful model, and consoles classmate Jessica after she breaks up with her boyfriend, Kevin, who is also his bully and one of John's best friends. After the dance, John shows up drunk at Steven's house and recounts an experience he had with another boy, whom he pushed away after they kissed. As John breaks down in tears and admits he is scared, Steven comforts him. The two spend the weekend together and start a secret relationship. Meanwhile, Jessica develops feelings for Steven and kisses him, but he is unable to tell her the truth about his homosexuality.

Steven has entered a competition in the local newspaper, intending to submit an article about growing up in the new millennium, but dissatisfied with his article, he fails to submit it. After Steven's father secretly submits his article, he is informed that he has won the competition. One evening, Steven and John meet in the woods, a popular gay cruising spot, but Steven is caught and brought home by the police. A few days later, Steven confronts John after discovering he went on a date with Christina. John insists he only went out with Christina to impress his friends and that he loves Steven.

Tired of concealing his sexuality, Steven submits an anonymous article about being gay to the school magazine, titled "Get Real". He confesses the truth to Jessica, who is supportive. Later, John invites Steven to spend the weekend at his place while his parents are away. When the headmaster forbids the article from being published, the students at the school magazine print an empty page with the word "Censored" in protest. As news of the censored article spread through the school, John confronts Steven after finding he wrote the article, fearing they will be exposed. When Kevin catches John and Steven in an embrace in the locker room, John beats up Steven to save face.

While accepting the prize for the newspaper competition at a school assembly, Steven confesses to writing the censored article and comes out as gay in front of the entire school, tired of feeling alone and longing to be accepted for who he is. Afterwards, Steven reconnects with his mother, who convinces his father that their son needs their support. John apologises to Steven for beating him up and says he loves him. Steven realises John is too afraid to come out and breaks up with him, wishing him happiness. As Steven leaves, Linda picks him up in her car and they drive away.

== Cast ==
- Ben Silverstone as Steven Carter
- Brad Gorton as John Dixon
- Charlotte Brittain as Linda
- Stacy A. Hart as Jessica
- Kate McEnery as Wendy
- Patrick Nielsen as Mark
- Tim Harris as Kevin Grainger
- James D. White as Dave
- Jacquetta May as Steven's mother
- David Lumsden as Steven's father
- David Elliot as Glen
- Morgan Jones as Linda's brother
- Richard Hawley as English teacher
- Louise J. Taylor as Christina Lindmann
- Steven Elder as Bob, the driving instructor
- David Paul West as bridegroom
- Andy Rashleigh as policeman
- Ian Brimble as John's father
- Judy Buxton as John's mother
- Martin Milman as headmaster

== Production ==
=== Development ===
In 1992, Patrick Wilde wrote What's Wrong with Angry? a stage play about a gay love story between two British schoolboys. Wilde said that he wrote the play because "I was sick of being told by people – even gay people – that it's easier to be gay now... But I don't believe it's easier than it ever was to come out." What's Wrong with Angry? first opened at the LOST Theatre in 1993 in Fulham, London and was then staged in January 1994 at the Oval House in London, where it sold out and was extended for an extra week at the Battersea Arts Centre (BAC) Studio. After the final performance, film director Simon Shore and producer Steven Taylor approached Wilde about producing a film version of the play.

During the early development of the script the production had the working title of Sweet Sixteen.

During development, director Simon Shore and writer Patrick Wilde, struggled to find a way to make heterosexual audiences understand why Steven was so tortured by staying in the closet. Shore later recalled that he "got Patrick to write a list of 20 reasons why it's bad to be gay and not come out" and that this list became a template for how they would make Steven's predicament comprehensible. For example, one item on Wilde's list was, "Girls fall in love with you, and you don't know what to tell them", which prompted a subplot in which a girl at school has a crush on Steven. "I wanted some way of identifying with the way Steven's being gay impacts everyone in his circle of friends", Shore says.

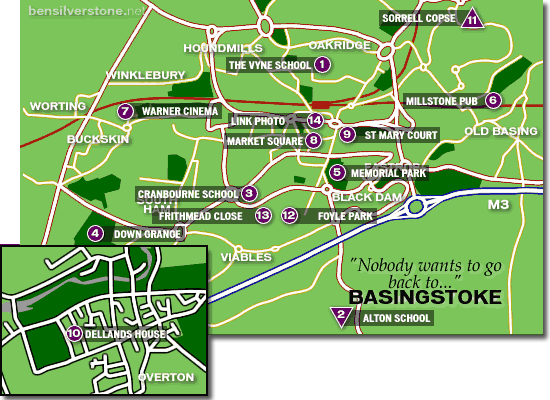
Map of the local area around Basingstoke

=== Filming ===
Filming on Get Real began on 17 August 1997 with shooting taking place throughout Basingstoke, including at Cranbourne School, Alton School, Market Square, Foyle Park, Sorrell's Corpse and the War Memorial Park.

The Vyne Community School which was used as the principal location for the fictional Belvedere School in the film.

Filming in Basingstoke ended on 21 September, with production moving on to the Millennium Studios in Borehamwood on the 22nd of September, where filming took place in the studio of scenes shot in Steven's bedroom and the inside of the public toilet. The entire movie took six weeks to shoot.

== Music ==
Get Real: Music from the Motion Picture Soundtrack

Soundtrack album by various artists
- Released: 1 June 1999
- Genres: Pop; alternative rock; Britpop
- Length: 50:28
- Label: BMG

Professional ratings
Review scores
Source	Rating
AllMusic	3/5 stars

Get Real: Music from the Motion Picture Soundtrack was released on 1 June 1999 by BMG on CD. Along with John Lunn's score, the album features tracks like Republica's "Ready to Go", the Troggs' "Love Is All Around", Cameo's "Word Up!" and Dodgy's "Staying Out for the Summer". A few songs that were featured in the film, including Aretha Franklin's "Respect" and "Think", Backstreet Boys' "If You Want It to Be Good Girl (Get Yourself a Bad Boy)", Kings of Infinite Space's "Misunderstood" and Charlotte Brittain's "Bobby's Girl", were omitted from the soundtrack due to copyright issues from their record labels.

=== Track listing ===
No.	Title	Writer(s)	Performer(s)	Length
1.	"Staying Out for the Summer"	Nigel Clark; Mathew Priest; Andy Miller	Dodgy	3:11
2.	"Word Up!"	Larry Blackmon; Tomi Jenkins	Cameo	4:18
3.	"Shine"	Neil Maccoll; Calum Maccoll; Leroy Danny Lendor; Robert Bond	Liberty Horses	4:04
4.	"Ready to Go"	Saffron; Tim Dorney; Andy Todd; Johnny Male	Republica	5:00
5.	"Play That Funky Music"	Rob Parissi	Dave Danger & the Chris Cawte Funk Band	3:54
6.	"Swings"	John Lunn	Münchner Symphoniker	1:08
7.	"You Are So Beautiful"	Billy Preston; Bruce Fisher	Ian Harrison	2:42
8.	"Love Is All Around"	Reg Presley	The Troggs	2:57
9.	"Inbetweener"	Louise Wener	Sleeper	3:18
10.	"Realisation"	John Lunn	Münchner Symphoniker	1:50
11.	"El Tranquilandia"	Paul Gallagher	North Pacific Drift	3:29
12.	"Beautiful One"	Robert White	The Milk and Honey Band	3:12
13.	"OM-23"	Steve Dixon; Brian Moss	Drug Free America	7:35
14.	"Get Real Suite"	John Lunn	Münchner Symphoniker	3:50

== Release ==
Get Real had its world premiere at the Edinburgh International Film Festival in August 1998 where it won the Audience award. Paramount Classic then purchased the film for distribution. It was released on 30 April 1999 in the United States and on 14 May 1999 in the United Kingdom, where the opening took place in Basingstoke where the story is set and the majority of the filming had taken place.

=== Home media ===
The film was released on VHS in the United Kingdom on 22 January 2001 and on DVD in the United States on 7 November 2017.

== Reception ==
=== Box office ===
On its opening weekend in the United States, Get Real earned $54,254, while on the following weekend, it earned $55,752 and on its third $78,100. The film grossed a worldwide total of $1.2 million.

=== Critical response ===
On the review aggregator website Rotten Tomatoes, 79% of 47 critics' reviews are positive, with an average rating of 6.5/10. The website's consensus reads: "An authentic portrayal of homosexuality in high school, Get Real is an engaging dramedy that doesn't sermonize its audience nor trivialize its characters."

In the Seattle Post-Intelligencer, Paula Nechak praised the film for allowing the characters to be themselves rather than change to fit in, and praises the treatment of the 'jock' character, John, as being just as bound by the school popularity game as Steven.

Roger Ebert commented, "Certainly this film has deeper values than the mainstream teenage comedies that retail aggressive materialism, soft-core sex and shallow ideas about "popularity." Steven Holden from The New York Times wrote, "The movie captures the excruciating paranoia of a situation in which there's nowhere the lovers can be alone except in each other's homes on the rare occasions their parents are out."

In the Daily Record, Siobhan Synnot criticised the film as being like a "preachy episode of Grange Hill with cardboard cut-out characters" and also criticised the character, John, for being unbelievable, describing him as "simply a bland fantasy hunk. It's hard to see how this dim bulb is bright enough for Oxford, because all the smart lines go to his smart-alec boyfriend."

The film ranked number 34 on Entertainment Weekly's list of the "50 Best High School Movies".

=== Accolades ===
Year	Award	Category	Nominee	Result	Ref.
1998	1998 Edinburgh International Film Festival	Audience Award	Get Real	Won	
1999	1998 Dinard British Film Festival	Golden Hitchcock	Simon Shore	Won	
1999	1998 Dinard British Film Festival	Audience Award	Simon Shore	Won	
1999	1999 British Independent Film Awards	Achievement in Production	Get Real	Nominated	
1999	10th International Filmfestival Emden-Norderney	Berhard Wicki Award	Get Real	Won	
1999	1st Golden Trailer Awards	Best Trailer with No Budget	Get Real	Nominated	
2000	Chlotrudis Awards	Chlotrudis Award for Best Actor	Ben Silverstone	Nominated	
