= Simon Shore =

British director, writer, and editor (born 1959)

Simon Shore (born 1959 in Hitchin, Hertfordshire) is a British director, writer, and editor. Shore studied film at the Royal College of Art, where he made several short films, including La Boule, which won a BAFTA award and was short-listed for the Student Oscar. He is best known for Things to Do Before You're 30 (2004) starring Dougray Scott, Emilia Fox and Billie Piper, and After Thomas (2006), about a boy with autism. Moviemail called After Thomas "gritty, warm and funny, but above all else is a realistic insight into every parent’s worst nightmare."

== Selected filmography ==
=== As director ===
- Get Real (1998)
- Things to Do Before You're 30 (2004)
- After Thomas (2006)
