= Blondel (musical) =

Blondel / Lute!
- Music: Stephen Oliver
- Lyrics: Tim Rice
- Book: Tim Rice
- Productions: 1983 London; 2006 London revival 2012 El Paso Reworked and re-titled as Lute!

Blondel, a rock opera musical by Tim Rice (book and lyrics) and Stephen Oliver (music), was inspired by, and very loosely based on, the life of the eponymous French troubadour. The play is set during the period of the Third Crusade.

Originally conceived by Tim Rice during his collaboration with Andrew Lloyd Webber, the project was originally titled "Come Back, Richard, Your Country Needs You" and a single of the same title was recorded in 1969. The project was shelved until Rice met Stephen Oliver in the 1970s, and the pair began working on a musical centering on King Richard I of England; as it developed, the project shifted its focus to a minstrel in the King's court, vying for pop-stardom, and his 'progressive' girlfriend.

Though the musical is largely a comic romp, it does tackle some serious issues. Historically, Blondel lays out the basic goings-on of the Third Crusade as told through the eyes of the English political environment. Although the musical frequently mentions the Crusade, it is never actually shown, excepting Richard's imprisonment in Austria upon his return trip. The play also deals with one of the many assassination attempts made on Richard, and an attempt by Prince John to steal the throne of England from his brother. As the Monks say at the end of Act One, 'Who said this piece wasn't educational?'

Blondel opened in London on 2 November 1983 and played in two different theatres in the West End, eventually closing after less than two years. After more than twenty years away from a professional London stage, it returned at the Pleasance Theatre in Islington. The new production starred Abi Finley, semi finalist of the hit BBC1 show How Do You Solve A Problem Like Maria?, and Chris Grierson, a regular from the teen soap, Hollyoaks. Produced by Pete Shaw, and directed by Patrick Wilde, the revived version of Blondel appeared for a limited season of six weeks.

Rice continued to develop the script and has recently created a new version of the show. This re-worked version (now titled Lute!) had its world premiere at the University of Texas at El Paso Dinner Theater from 27 January 2012 until 12 February 2012.

Although many productions have been staged worldwide, Blondel has never appeared on Broadway.

== Synopsis ==
Act I

The opening words of the musical (above) as sung by a group of Monks explain the situation ("Monks' Introduction"). Blondel is an unappreciated musician trying to make his big break by writing a song for the King, Richard the Lionheart. Fiona, his girlfriend, feels that it's a waste of time to write for the King as the monarchy can't possibly be around for much longer. Even though she does enjoy the tune, she suggests he get a real job to help support her. Blondel explains that he can't. He says that he "nearly hit big with 'Send in the Jesters'" and feels a breakthrough coming and to give up now would be impossible. Fiona leaves Blondel and decides to take her well-being into her own hands. ("Blondel and Fiona/I'm a Monarchist")

The Monks open the Ministry of Feudal Affairs ("incorporating the Departments of Unemployment, the Environment, Social Security, and Gratuitous Executions"), which is "presided over by HRH Prince John" at which Fiona promptly shows to ask for her freedom. Unwilling and unable to pay the fee, Fiona is first denied her request by Prince John and later denied it by the King who explains that "running this joint's not as cheap as it looks". Fiona is swept aside in order for the King to announce that he will be embarking on the Crusade and that John will be in charge while the King is away. Fiona is enraged by this notion as it will expend more money to go on the Crusade than it would to grant her freedom and she leaves the court. ("The Ministry of Feudal Affairs") Fiona and Blondel soon find themselves together again. He manages to convince her that his song for the King will grant them all their wishes and she agrees to help him. ("The Least of My Troubles")

"Thus reunited, what a touching scene" the Monks proclaim as Fiona and Blondel set off to meet the King at Dover before he embarks on his journey. Once there Blondel is unable to present his song to Richard as the King is anxious to leave and doesn't have time for such things. Richard suggests Blondel should take it up with John instead and the Crusaders leave for the Holy Land. ("Lionheart") Back at the Ministry of Feudal Affairs, Blondel and Fiona present the song to John who promptly throws the song away and proclaims that all songs should from now on be dedicated to him and not Richard. ("No Rhyme for Richard") John then tasks Blondel to write a song about him but Blondel refuses, saying it's an important job but that his heart's just not in it. Fiona is outraged by Blondel's refusal of work saying that this is the break he's been waiting for. As Blondel lists his reasons for not wanting to write a song dedicated to his Prince, both John and Fiona grow increasingly angered. The scene culminates in John banishing Blondel to the Continent and declaring "snub a prince but realize you've sunk a singing career". ("Trio")

Promptly realizing he's made a mistake by sending Blondel after Richard, John's mood becomes depressed. A mysterious man appears by John's side and offers to take care of the problem for him, for a price, but misidentifies the target as Blondel and can't identify the real target, the King, at all.

Once all is set straight, the Assassin sets off on Richard's trail. ("Assassin's Song") The act closes with Fiona, realizing that Blondel doesn't love her as much as he loves his music and that she'll never get the kind of social change she wants. Even through her realizations, Fiona decides to chase after Blondel, unsure of what she's actually looking for. ("Running Back for More")

Act II

Act Two opens on the Continent, Blondel in hot pursuit of King Richard. Blondel journeys through France, Spain, and Italy wowing crowds of natives with his music and searching high and low for his King ("Have you seen my King?" "NO!") but to no avail. As the trek continues, Blondel begins to lose hope that he'll ever find Richard. Meanwhile, the Assassin chases after Blondel, his patience with the troubadour's music thinning. At the point of giving up on the chase, Blondel runs into Fiona who tells him that Richard is being held prisoner in Austria by Duke Leopold and the pair take off to find the King together. ("Blondel in Europe")

While sitting in prison, Richard laments about his situation and longs for the days of the Crusade when he was free to do as he pleased. Back in London, John, pleased with his own cleverness and handiwork, prepares himself for becoming King of England. ("Saladin Days/I Can't Wait to be King") Arriving in Salzburg, the pursuers come to rest in an inn just before completing the last leg of the journey to the King's cell. The Assassin admits that he's becoming extremely discouraged by the whole situation and that the "job is killing me". Blondel, on the other hand, has a renewed sense of ambition and refuses to give up declaring that the King will soon be found. Fiona suggests that lingering would not behoove anyone at this point and they should press on before time has run out though she is still unsure whether or not she really wants to help. The Assassin decides that he'd "rather murder Prince John" but will soldier on while John announces that Richard has died on his Crusade and that he will be assuming the throne of England. ("The Inn at Salzburg/Blondel's Search")

Having found the King in his prison, Fiona decides to speak with the Duke of Austria about letting Richard go and the Assassin nears his victim, poised for the murder. The Duke dictates a letter to Prince John, demanding a million-crown ransom. Fiona sweet-talks and flatters the Duke in order to get him to release Richard, which the Duke agrees to. ("The Duke of Austria's Quarter") Ready to give up the search, Blondel, quite by accident, runs into Richard. With Richard now released, the Duke's English visitors make their way out of the castle but just as they're about to walk out the door, the Duke has a sudden change of heart and decides that he's not going to let them go after all. The Duke will only let Blondel and Richard go if Fiona will stay with him in Austria. Unwilling to stay with Leopold, Fiona tricks him into walking outside toward someone she says is better-suited for him at which point the Assassin, seeing the crown on the Duke's head, attacks, killing him. Richard, Blondel, and Fiona declare it to be "a most important day" and decide it's time to go back to England. However, before they leave, Fiona demands a pardon and her freedom from the King in exchange for keeping her mouth shut about the monarchy to which the King agrees reluctantly. Meanwhile, the Assassin, having killed the wrong man, laments about his "first failure" and wonders if he can make a comeback. However he goes on to discover that he didn't even really kill the Duke ("Leopold is a-okay") and the two men find comfort in the other's mistakes. ("The Cell")

Blondel, Fiona, and Richard make their way back to England where John is proceeding with his plans to become King. Having declared Richard dead, John impatiently awaits his coronation. At the moment before the crown is placed on John's head, Richard bursts through the doors and puts a swift end to the illegal ceremony. ("Westminster Abbey") Having stopped his brother's coronation, Richard declares Blondel the "country's foremost composer" and at last allows him to perform his song. With the help of the Blondettes, Blondel becomes the pop sensation he'd been waiting to become. ("I'm a Monarchist (Reprise)") Having been absolved their indiscretions and declared friends and heroes of the monarchy, Blondel and Fiona renew their relationship and declare their love for each other. ("Running Back for More (Reprise)")

== Production history ==
=== The London Stage ===
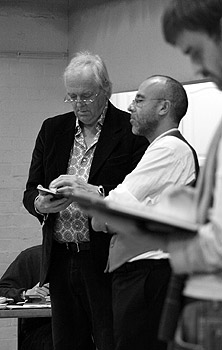
Tim Rice and Patrick Wilde (Matt Harrop in foreground) at rehearsals for London revival of Blondel

Blondel opened in Bath on 12 September 1983 and soon moved to Manchester where it stayed for two weeks before moving to the newly refurbished Old Vic on 2 November. Lord Olivier spoke the prologue at a Gala performance on 8 November. The show remained at the Old Vic for eleven months before moving to the Aldwych on London's West End. Because of high production costs and decreasing revenues, Blondel closed in the Aldwych after only eight months.

Original Cast

- Blondel – Paul Nicholas
- Fiona – Sharon Lee-Hill
- Richard – Stephen Tate
- John – David Burt
- The Assassin – Chris Langham
- Leopold – Kevin Williams
- The Monks – Cantabile (group) – Richard Bryan, Nicholas Ibbotson, Stewart Collins & Michael Steffan

The London revival of the show opened at the Pleasance Theatre on 23 November 2006. The production saw the show revamped and rearranged by Tim Rice and director Patrick Wilde. Young composer Mathew Pritchard took Stephen Oliver's original score and completely rearranged the work, also adding new material. The story was sharpened, particularly in the second act, to produce a punchier (and funnier) version particularly well suited for an ensemble production.

2006 London Cast

- Blondel – Chris Grierson
- Fiona – Abi Finley
- Richard – Mark Inscoe
- John – Matt Harrop
- The Assassin – Napoleon Ryan
- Leopold – David Paul West
- Monks – James Durrant, Gavin James, Charlie Tighe, Nick Trumble
- The Blondettes – Zoe Harrison, Polli Redston, Rebecca Seale

=== Blondel in the United States ===
The first production of Blondel in the United States was staged at the University of Texas in El Paso by the Union Dinner Theatre. It opened on 11 April 1985. Blondel was again produced in the United States by Farmingdale High School in Long Island, New York during May 1985. Both productions were attended by Tim Rice. Since the mid-1980s, Blondel has been produced by theaters and amateur groups all around the world but has yet to take its place on the Broadway stage.

== Characters ==
- Blondel – A monarchist and unappreciated musician waiting, rather frustratedly, for his big break.
- Fiona – His girlfriend, a serf of the English court and English activist eight centuries ahead of her time.
- King Richard the Lionheart – The King of England.
- Prince John – The power-hungry and ambitious Prince of England and heir to the throne.
- The Assassin – A hired hand willing to kill anyone for the right price.
- The Duke of Austria – Leopold, the ruler of Austria, and captor of King Richard.
- The Monks – A group serving as narrators and commentators.
- The Blondettes – Blondel's backing singers.

== Musical numbers ==
Note: Several Numbers are actually combinations of shorter songs that fit cohesively into one larger "super-number" and are sometimes broken down and titled as such. These numbers are indicated and the alternate titles given.

Act I

- Monks' Introduction – The Monks
- Blondel and Fiona/I'm a Monarchist – Blondel, Fiona, the Blondettes^
  - The Creative Process – Blondel (not in 2006 revival)
  - How Long Can Someone Wait – Fiona
  - I'm a Monarchist – Blondel, the Blondettes
  - Artistes Are Tragic and Sensitive Souls – Blondel, Fiona, the Blondettes
- The Ministry of Feudal Affairs – Fiona, Richard, John, the Monks^
  - The Ministry of Feudal Affairs – The Monks
  - Fiona's Plea to John – Fiona, John
  - Richard's Intervention – Richard (not in 2006 revival)
  - Economic Acrostic – Fiona, Richard, John (not in 2006 revival)
  - Crusade Rally – Fiona, Richard, John
- The Least of My Troubles – Blondel, Fiona
- Lionheart – Richard, the Monks
- No Rhyme for Richard – John
- Trio – Blondel, Fiona, John (not in 2006 revival)
- Assassin's Song – John, the Assassin
- Running Back for More – Fiona, the Monks, the Blondettes

Act II

- Blondel in Europe – Blondel, Fiona, the Assassin, the Monks, the Blondettes
- Saladin Days/I Can't Wait to be King – Richard, John, the Monks^
  - Saladin Days – Richard, the Monks
  - I Can't Wait to be King – John
- The Inn at Salzburg/Blondel's Search – Blondel, Fiona, Richard, John, the Assassin, the Monks^
  - The Inn at Salzburg – Blondel, Fiona, the Assassin, the Monks
  - Blondel's Search – Blondel, Fiona, Richard, John, the Assassin, the Monks
- The Duke of Austria's Quarters – Fiona, the Assassin, the Duke, the Monks
- The Cell – Blondel, Fiona, Richard, the Assassin, the Duke^
  - Reunion – Blondel, Fiona, Richard
  - Death of a Statesman – Blondel, Fiona, Richard, the Assassin, the Duke
  - Tribute to a Statesman – Blondel, Fiona, Richard
  - A Royal Pardon – Blondel, Fiona, Richard
  - The Wrong Train – The Assassin, the Duke
- Westminster Abbey – Richard, John, the Monks^
  - John's Coronation – John, the Monks
  - Richard's Return – Richard
- I'm a Monarchist (Reprise) – Blondel, the Blondettes
- Running Back for More (Reprise) – Blondel, Fiona

=== "The English Stage" ===
Although it did not appear on the record album or in the Libretto, the London run of the show later added a final song, "The English Stage," sung by the whole cast at the end of the show.
