= Paul Reiffer =

British photographer

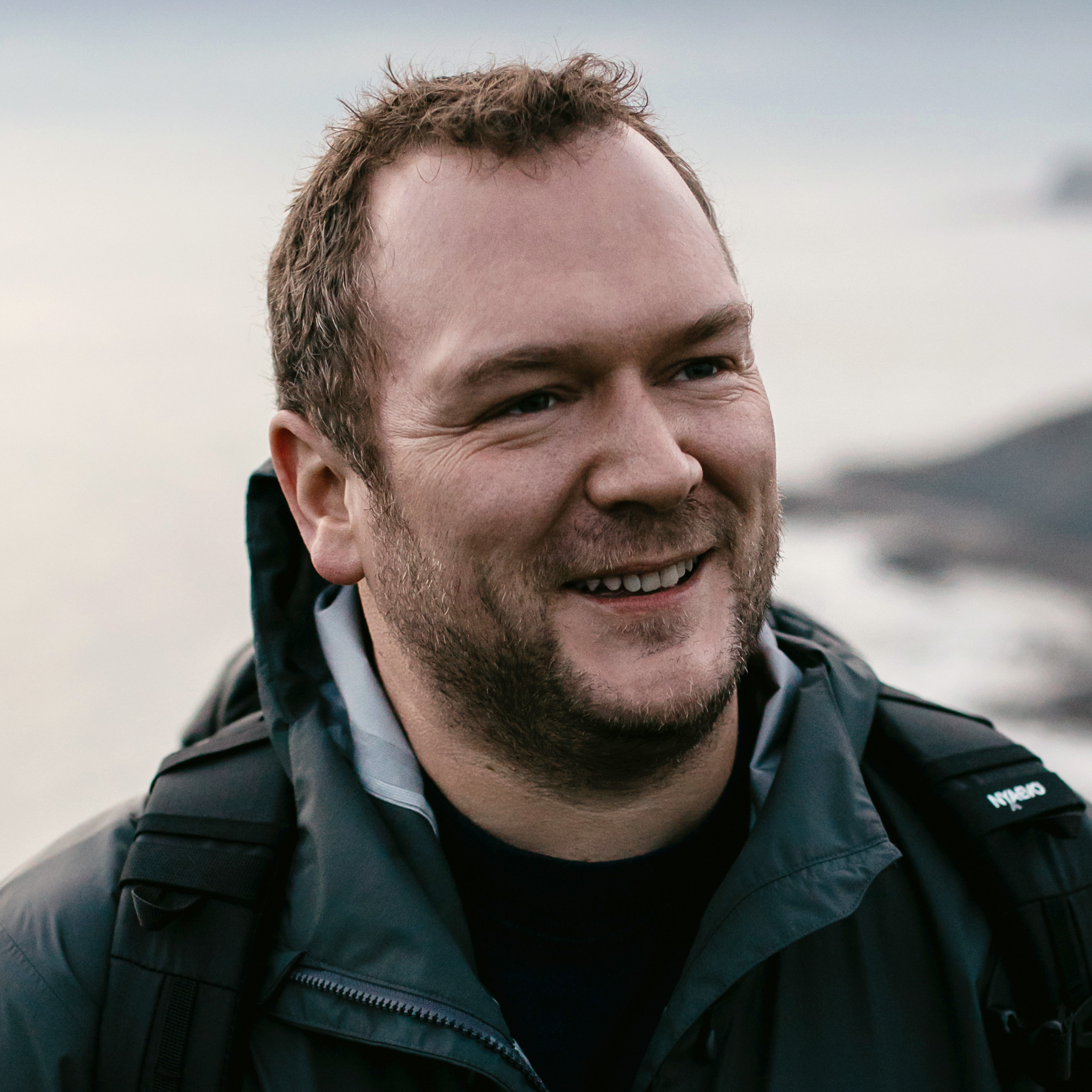
- Paul Reiffer
- Born: 1980 (age 45–46); Dorset
- Occupation: Photographer
- Website: https://www.paulreiffer.com

Paul Reiffer is a British commercial and landscape photographer.

== Photography ==
Paul Reiffer gained specific media attention during his 3 year project focused on the Asia-Pacific region from 2012 to 2015. This work saw him recognised with a Fellowship of the British Institute of Professional Photography as well as being presented with the UN/UNESCO "International Year of Light" award for his images of Shanghai at night.

His work has been viewed across three continents – from the largest video screen on the planet in Times Square, New York, to the Royal Photographic Society's Print Exhibition in the Royal Albert Hall in London.

With clients ranging from high-end hotel groups such as W Hotels and Shangri-La, to National Parks, to airlines and marketing companies, his work has a presence in many countries around the world in both advertising and collectible fine art prints.

His signature iconic landscapes and cityscapes have been published by National Geographic as well as the international press and used by tourism boards around the globe, while he continues to sell limited edition prints to collectors worldwide.

== Early life ==
From an early age Reiffer developed his interest in photography through spending time with his father, watching him develop images in a self-built darkroom in their family home.

== Awards and recognition ==
Reiffer was awarded the "Golden Camera" as Landscape Photographer of the Year 2025 in the FEP (Federation of European Professional Photographers) awards in May 2025.

The British Institute of Professional Photography recognised and awarded Reiffer as Landscape Photographer of the Year 2022, Architectural and Industrial Photographer of the Year 2022 and Fine Art Photographer of the Year 2021.

Reiffer is a Fellow of the British Institute of Professional Photography and Fellow of the Royal Photographic Society, having been accepted by both organisations for direct entry at an Associate level due to the breadth of his existing portfolio. He was a finalist in the 2010 Landscape Photographer of the Year for his images of the British coastline and won awards for his portraiture work in the controversial BIPP Professional Photography Awards 2012. In 2015, he was presented with the UN/UNESCO "International Year of Light" award for his images of Shanghai at night and is currently a shortlisted finalist for the 2016 British Professional Photography Awards.

== Photographic style ==
Notably angered in 2015 by the increasing levels of post-processing that was becoming acceptable in the photographic world, Reiffer began a campaign (Dusck Veidh) to educate customers and viewers in the difference between "making it" and "faking it" – starting with his review of "how far is too far?" when it came to many photographers using computer-aided tools to enhance their images beyond reality.

Reiffer is a supporter of "getting it right in-camera" and through his use of behind-the-scenes iPhone and GoPro images captioned "What I See Right Now", attempts to demonstrate that his images, while corrected for minor issues using software, are indeed accurate representations of the scene he captured with his camera at the time. He often provides information on how an image was captured, with details on filters used and camera settings.

== Partnerships ==
Reiffer is a National Geographic contributor, with his work from New Zealand featuring in their 2016 Hardback book "Greatest Landscapes".

He maintains active partnerships with photographic industry manufacturers such as Rollei and SanDisk, along with being one of a handful of officially recognised Global Phase One Ambassadors worldwide.

In August 2018, Reiffer produced the launch images for the Phase One IQ4 Series of Medium Format Cameras, using their latest 151 Megapixel digital back.

He maintains an active partnership in an advisory capacity with Danish software company Capture One, presenting regular free editing clinics and workshops online for other photographers worldwide.

== Workshops and Tuition ==
Across a range of worldwide locations, Reiffer is known in the photographic community for providing hands-on workshop education to all levels of student. His collaboration with Danish camera manufacturer Phase One took that one step further in 2015 when he was able to start offering workshops using the latest medium format cameras for all attendees to use – including the XF100MP, the world's highest resolution medium format digital camera.

== Maldives Gallery – prhf ==
In January 2016, Reiffer launched his first gallery in the Maldives – prhf – on PER AQUUM Huvafen Fushi.
