= Ed Corbin =

American actor

- Born: Ed Lee Corbin; February 1963 (age 63); Rome, Georgia
- Other names: Lee Corbin, Eddie Corbin, Edward Corbin, Edward Lee Corbin, Ed Cannon
- Occupation: Actor
- Years active: 1990–present

Ed Corbin is an American actor who is best known for his supporting roles in such films as To Protect and Serve (2001), Chrystal (2004), Trailer Park of Terror (2008) and True Grit (2010).

== Early life ==
Corbin attended Armuchee High School in Rome, Georgia and worked as a pulpwooder in his family business while in high school. He graduated from the University of Georgia with honors, Finance 87.

== Acting career ==
Corbin made his film debut as a patient to Danny Nelson's "Jake Pruitt" character in Tucker Johnston's Blood Salvage (1990). The film launched Corbin's career as a supporting actor which followed with such films as Midnight Edition (1993), Blue Sky (1994), In the Flesh (1998), and Barstow 2008 (2001). In addition to his film roles, Corbin also appeared on such television shows as The X-Files ("Trevor", 1999) as a correctional officer, The Amanda Show (two episodes, 2000–01), on which he played a fictional character called "The Boost" on a commercial parody of the same name, and a role children best remember him by, The Bold and the Beautiful (1987–present) as a bouncer, and Becker (one episode, 2001) as a cell mate.

== Personal life ==
Corbin currently resides in Los Angeles, Canoga Park neighborhood, California.

== Filmography ==
- Vampire Cop (1990) — Vampire Cop Lucas
- Blood Salvage (1990) — Jake's Patient
- Midnight Edition (1993) — Man in Hardware Store
- Blue Sky (1994) — Stockade MP
- Vicious Kiss (1995) — Thug #2
- In the Flesh (1998) — Philip Kirsch
- The Real Reason (Men Commit Crimes) (1998) — Marty
- Barstow 2008 (2001) — Tree Williams
- To Protect and Serve (2001) — Officer Holloway
- Chrystal (2004) — Ned
- Trailer Park of Terror (2008) — Sgt. Stank
- True Grit (2010) — Bear Man
- The Congress (2013) — Charlie (uncredited)
- Altergeist (2014) — Henry Blaine
- Atlas Shrugged (2014) — Lineman
- Faces (2014-2015, TV Series) — Ned Mason
- K.C. Undercover (2015, TV Series) — Traffic Cop
- Abidig (2021) — Vincent D.E.A
- "Amos Moses" — Jerry Reed music video
