= In the Flesh (1998 film) =

1998 American film

- Cover of video release
- Directed by: Ben Taylor
- Written by: Ben Taylor
- Produced by: Joe Ansley and Ben Taylor (executive producers); Julie R. Lee
- Starring: Dane Ritter; Ed Corbin; Alex Dawson
- Cinematography: Brian Gurley
- Edited by: Bazyl Dripps
- Music by: Eddie Horst
- Distributed by: Wolfe Video
- Release date: 1998
- Running time: 102 minutes
- Country: United States
- Language: English

In the Flesh is a 1998 American independent gay-themed murder mystery film, produced, written, and directed by Ben Taylor. It is set in Atlanta, Georgia where it was filmed on a very low budget, according to the writer-director. It tells how two gay men on both sides of the law are brought together as intimate friends amid the dark events and circumstances that surround them.

== Plot ==
When police detective Philip Kirsch (Ed Corbin) and college business student Oliver Beck (Dane Ritter), closeted gay men, are brought together, they end up outed at the same time. Detective Kirsch is working undercover to bust a drug ring that operates out of "The Blue Boy," a back street, gay bar and brothel, at which Oliver works as the head hustler—his calling card being his wearing red trousers.

Oliver succeeds in hustling Philip, who subsequently falls in love with him. Philip uses his resources as a policeman to find out more about Oliver and his past, which he discovers to be dark and tragic. Philip runs into Oliver at his day job in a music store, and Oliver is grateful to him for his discretion in not letting on that he knows him. This friendliness quickly disappears when Oliver catches Philip following him. When he finds out that Philip is a police detective, that makes him even more undesirable to him. All this drastically changes when Oliver needs help later on.

Although Oliver has the redeeming quality of caring for dependent people like his sister Lisa (Adele Phares), who is suffering from drug addiction, and befriending a mentally challenged adolescent, Mickey (Michael A. Newcomer), he cannot get over the guilt and self-loathing brought on by his causing the death of his close boyhood friend, Christopher Wingate (Erik Wingate), in a car crash brought on by his own drunken driving. He especially hates himself for avoiding drunk driving charges by moving his friend's dead body into the driver's seat of the wrecked car. He expresses his sorrow each night he begins work at The Blue Boy by going to the jukebox, selecting the song "Breathe" (written by Wes Yoakam and performed by him and his band PopCycle, also known as Catfish Jenkins), and dancing to it with tears in his eyes. It is when he is doing this that Philip Kirsch sees him the first night of his stakeout.

It is Oliver's self-hatred and his fear of trusting anyone with his secrets that move him to control his sexual and emotional life by hustling. He is as successful at it as Philip is successful at being a police detective. Unfortunately, this causes them both to be surrounded by jealous rivals. Philip's associate detectives Grupe and Meyer are such rivals. Meyer is secretly involved in "The Blue Boy" drug ring from which Oliver gets heroin for his sister, and Oliver's knowledge of the drug ring, coupled with his growing connection to the investigating Kirsch, is a motive for Meyer to get rid of him by framing him with the murder of Mac, one of Oliver's best customers. Meyer poses as a mugger, who stabs Mac to death while he is getting money at an ATM. Oliver is with Mac at the time: he is driving Mac's car because Mac is intoxicated. Oliver, then, becomes a witness to the murder, noticing the curious luminous watch on the muffled mugger's wrist. In fear he drives away in Mac's car, but he realizes that he is in serious trouble. When Philip finds Oliver to talk with him, he warns him to go to the police so that he could be a witness rather than a suspect.

Oliver is arrested for Mac's murder, but Meyer's plan is thwarted by Philip Kirsch, who provides an alibi for Oliver after he determines his innocence. Philip stands by Oliver when he is deserted by his friends and associates. Oliver is spurned by his girlfriend and boss Chloe (Alex Dawson), who is furious at him for being a gay hustler. He is barred and betrayed at the bar and is delivered to the police; and, even though he is released on the alibi Philip provided for him, he is evicted from his apartment with a week's notice by his landlady. Oliver has no one to turn to but Philip, who invites him to stay at his apartment. This support for Oliver is socially and economically costly for Philip: he is outed at work and suspended by his boss, police Lieutenant Krane (Roxzane T. Mims).

When Oliver moves in with Philip they only begin sleeping together when Oliver looks upon their intimacy as love freely given rather than as purchased sexual favors. Oliver is uncertain about what he is to do about his "night job" in view of his developing bond with Philip, but he must continue to make money to supply heroin to his sister.

The night that Oliver returns to his job at "The Blue Boy", Philip follows him to get him to quit hustling and exotic dancing and come home with him. Oliver sadly refuses, so Philip knocks him unconscious in the dressing room and takes him back to the apartment. Oliver is out of harm's way for Philip to go back to his police lieutenant with the information needed to bust "The Blue Boy" drug ring.

When Oliver awakens, he finds himself handcuffed to the weight bench. He succeeds in freeing himself, but he finds in a desk drawer a luminous watch identical with that worn by Mac's murderer. He angrily leaves the apartment supposing Philip guilty of Mac's murder, and he continues to suspect Philip until he finds that Detective Grupe, who stops and picks him up on the street, is wearing one of the suspicious watches as well. Thinking Grupe to be the murderer, Oliver escapes from his car and returns to Philip's apartment. The luminous watches provide the mystery plot with two red herrings, and moments later in the film it is revealed that the police lieutenant had given her whole department these watches.

At the apartment Philip is on the phone with his police lieutenant informing her of Oliver's disappearance when he is attacked from behind by Meyer, who knocks him unconscious and hangs up the phone. His plan is once again to frame Oliver with murder by killing Philip.

Oliver's return to the apartment stops Meyer from killing Philip, but Meyer succeeds in wounding both Philip and Oliver in the struggle that ensues. Meyer is about to kill them both when he is shot and killed from behind by Det. Grupe.

The last scene shows Oliver meeting Philip on the college campus some days later. Philip tests Oliver's reformation by asking him if he remembers his name. Oliver does and admits that he no longer considers Philip a john. They walk away up the sidewalk together.

== Cast ==
- Dane Ritter as Oliver Beck
- Ed Corbin as Det. Philip Kirsch
- Philip Solomon as Det. Meyer
- Frank Roberts as Mac
- Brandon O'Dell as Bones
- Adele Phares as Lisa Beck
- Alex Dawson as Chloe
- Roxzane T. Mims as Leut. Krane
- Michael A. Newcomer as Mickey
- Erik Wingate as Christopher Wingate
- Adrian Roberts as Det. Grupe
- Shimley Reynolds as Raven
- Rosemary Dixon as Miss Koschnick
- Joe Floccari as Jersey Boy

== Awards ==
Nominations

- Verzaubert – International Gay & Lesbian Film Festival Rosebud Best Film 1998

== DVD release ==
The DVD of the film was released on August 22, 2000 by WolfeVideo, Ltd.
