= Glenn Chandler =

Scottish writer

- Born: 12 March 1949 (age 77); Edinburgh, Scotland
- Occupations: Playwright, screenwriter, novelist
- Writing career
- Period: Modern
- Genre: Crime fiction
- Subject: Murder
- Notable work: Taggart
- Notable awards: BAFTA; 1991 best drama series award – Taggart Writers' Guild Award; 1993 best original drama series – Taggart

Glenn Chandler (born 12 March 1949) is a Scottish playwright, novelist, producer and theatre director. He has written plays for theatre and radio, original screenplays for television and films, television series, and also novels. His best known work is the Scottish television detective series Taggart, which was commissioned by Scottish Television for the ITV Network from 2 July 1985 until 7 November 2010, and which continues to be broadcast around the world. Since the completion of Taggart in 2010, Glenn Chandler has focused on writing for the theatre, with a consistent run of productions in both London and Edinburgh.

== Biography ==
=== Early life and Taggart ===
Glenn Chandler was born in Edinburgh in 1949, and educated at the Royal High School in the city. He moved from Scotland to London and began writing for the Soho Poly, where his early plays were produced. He went on to write for BBC Television and Radio, and for Granada Television (including its series Crown Court) before creating and writing his own series Taggart for STV Productions (ITV Network).

Chandler created Taggart for STV's Controller of Drama, Robert Love, who wanted to set a police series in Glasgow. Chandler was inspired by true crime and real life, and even lifted the names of characters for the series from gravestones in Maryhill Cemetery in Glasgow. The series continued even after the death of the actor Mark McManus, who played the lead role of Jim Taggart, and became the longest-running police drama on British television.

=== Theatre career ===
==== Return to theatre ====
Glenn Chandler has continued to write for his first love, theatre, and has also written a series of books featuring a Brighton detective, DI Madden. In 2008, Chandler took two plays to the Edinburgh Festival Fringe as a producer. These were Boys of the Empire, a satirical play written by Chandler himself, and What's Wrong With Angry?, a drama set in 1992, when the age of consent for homosexuals was 21. Both shows were directed by Patrick Wilde, with whom Chandler shares a literary agency, MBA.

Since then, Chandler has worked almost exclusively in theatre. After transferring Boys of the Empire to the Kings Head Theatre in Islington, he wrote and produced Scouts in Bondage for the same theatre in 2009. His next production was the successful Cleveland Street: The Musical in 2010, which he wrote and produced for the Above The Stag Theatre, which was at its original location in Victoria. He made his directing debut with the award-winning The Custard Boys which he adapted from the novel by John Rae, and this was produced at the Tabard Theatre in 2011. He followed that up at the same theatre with The Lamplighters in 2012, a murder thriller with a supernatural edge, which he wrote, produced and directed. In 2013, he took two productions to the Edinburgh Festival Fringe, Sandel and Killers. Sandel, which he directed, was his controversial adaptation of Angus Stewart's novel of the same name, about a love affair between a student and a choirboy. Killers was a study of the correspondence of serial killers Dennis Nilsen, Peter Sutcliffe and Ian Brady, and was directed by Liam Rudden. In 2014, he transferred Sandel to the Above The Stag Theatre at its new premises in Vauxhall with a largely new cast.

==== Success on the fringe ====
In 2017, Chandler adapted the 1967 novel Lord Dismiss Us into a play for the Edinburgh Festival Fringe, in order to mark the 50th Anniversary of the partial legalisation of homosexuality in England and Wales. The play received positive reviews, and subsequently transferred to the Above The Stag Theatre in London later that year. The play was again reviewed positively, and was four times nominated for the Offies, including: 'Best Production' and 'Best New Play'.

2018 saw Chandler write and produce Kids Play for that year's Edinburgh Festival Fringe. As was the case with Lord Dismiss Us, Chandler's latest production was well received by critics, and was also the recipient of the Broadway Baby Bobby Award for the "Best show of the Fringe". After its run in Edinburgh, Kids Play transferred to London's Above The Stag Theatre with a new cast. Following the conclusion of the run of Kids Play in London, Glenn Chandler wrote another new play called The Boy Under the Christmas Tree for the 2018 Christmas season at the King's Head Theatre in Islington, with Chandler again choosing to direct his own piece. This play did not receive the same level of critical success as Lord Dismiss Us and Kids Play, and reviews were more mixed. Stephen Vowles, writing for the Boyz magazine, described the play as an "intriguing piece of modern theatre", whilst Greg Stewart of Theatre Weekly stated that "it's utter silliness, but remarkably funny". These comments were contrasted, however, by other press reports, some of which criticised the humour of the piece.

==== Latest work ====
2019 began with the revival of Glenn Chandler's musical Fanny and Stella, a production which initially premiered at the Above The Stag Theatre in 2015. As was the case with the original, the 2019 production was directed by Steven Dexter. Telling the real-life story of two Victorian cross-dressers called Boulton and Park, it was met with widespread positive reviews.

Later that year, Chandler took a new play, The Good Scout, to the Edinburgh Festival Fringe. Having come across the true story of exchange visits between Hitler Youth and British Boy Scouts in the 1930s, he also took inspiration from the Brexit crisis of the time, comparing the "good intentions" of the exchange visits to the "devastation of Europe". Following previews in London, The Good Scout premiered at Surgeons' Hall in Edinburgh, and was met with largely positive reviews. The play was also the recipient of the ScotsGay Magazine Award for Best New Writing.

Following its successful run in Edinburgh, The Good Scout transferred to the Above the Stag Theatre in London later that year. The London version of the play, which used mostly the same cast, was met with further positive reviews from critics.

== Work ==
=== Television ===
- Taggart (1983–2010) STV
- Dalziel and Pascoe (2006) BBC
- Dr Crippen (2004) Yorkshire Television
- The Brides in the Bath (2003) Yorkshire Television
- A Is for Acid (2002) Yorkshire Television
- The Life and Crimes of William Palmer (1998) Yorkshire Television
- Chiller (1995) Yorkshire Television
- Call Me Mister (1986) BBC
- Crown Court (1982–1984) Granada television
- Dramarama (1983) STV
- Angels (1975) BBC
- The Jewel and the Magpie Granada television
- The Kidnap of Mrs Muriel McKay Granada television
- To Kidnap a Princess Granada television

=== Film ===
- Savage Tide (2004) Ecosse Films
- Final Sentence Ecosse Films
- Deadly Advice (1994) Zenith Productions
- True North

=== Theatre ===
- The Good Scout (Also directed by Glenn Chandler at the Edinburgh Fringe, August 2019)
- The Boy Under the Christmas Tree (Also directed by Glenn Chandler at the King's Head Theatre, Christmas 2018 and January 2019)
- Kids Play (Also directed by Glenn Chandler at the Edinburgh Fringe, August 2018 and subsequently the Above The Stag Theatre, 2017)
- Lord Dismiss Us (Also directed by Glenn Chandler at the Edinburgh Fringe, August 2017 and subsequently the Above The Stag Theatre, October - November 2017)
- Fanny and Stella (Directed by Steven Dexter, Above The Stag Theatre, 2015. Revived at the Above the Stag in 2019).
- Sandel – Adapted from the novel by Angus Stewart (Self Directed) at Edinburgh Fringe 2013 & Above the Stag Theatre, Vauxhall 2014
- Killers (Directed by Liam Rudden) at Brighton Fringe 2013 & Edinburgh Fringe 2013
- The Lamplighters (Self Directed) at The Tabard Theatre 2013
- On The Game (Little Theatre Club)
- The Private (Pitlochry Workshop Theatre, Soho Poly)
- Biker's Knoll (Directed by Brian Croucher)
- A Treat (Directed by Brian Croucher at Brighton Actors' Workshop)
- Moonlight Across the Heather (Directed by Brian Croucher)
- A Curse (Directed by Brian Croucher, produced in the Netherlands)
- Boys of the Empire (Directed by Patrick Wilde at the Edinburgh Fringe and again at the King's Head Theatre)
- Scouts in Bondage (Directed by Terence Barton at the King's Head Theatre)

=== Radio ===
Schools Radio

- Inquiry 7 scripts
- Life Time 2 scripts
- Teenage Plays: Job, Which Job?

Radio Drama

- A Little White Lie 30'
- Rough Play 60'
- Laddie Time 45'
- Another Gaff, Another Night 45'
- The Horseman's Word 30'
- Wallace's Warblers 30'
- Green Street Revisited 30'
- Fisherman's Tales 30'
- Wayfarers 30'

=== Books ===
DI Madden series

- Dead Sight (Hodder & Stoughton, October 2004)
- Savage Tide (Hodder & Stoughton, July 2003)

Horror fiction

- The Sanctuary (Hamlyn)
- The Tribe (Hamlyn)

Non fiction

- Burning Poison (Lea Valley Press)
- Killer (Mainstream)
- Taggart's Glasgow (Lennard Publishing)
- The Sins Of Jack Saul (Grosvenor House Publishing)

== Awards ==
- BAFTA (1997) Taggart nominated for Best Drama Serial Award
- BAFTA (1995) nominated Best TV Writer
- Writers' Guild of Great Britain Award (1993) winner of Best Original Drama Serial
- BAFTA (1991) Taggart winner of Best Drama Serial Award
