= What's Wrong with Angry? =

Play by Patrick Wilde

What's Wrong with Angry? Poster for the 2008 Edinburgh Fringe production directed by Patrick Wilde

What's Wrong with Angry? is a stage play written in 1992 by Patrick Wilde about a gay love story between two British schoolboys. The play was the basis for the 1998 Paramount Classics feature film Get Real.

== History ==
What's Wrong with Angry? was Wilde's first play. It was written in an era of British history when the age of consent for homosexuals was 5 years older than heterosexuals, and legislation called Section 28 prohibited schools and local authorities from depicting homosexual relationships as an acceptable view of family life. The central characters – Steven Carter and John Westhead – were both still at school, and Wilde has pointed out that it is "quite crucial" that Carter is 16, as he wanted to draw attention to the fact Carter was breaking the law, whereas his heterosexual peers at school were not.

== Productions ==
What's Wrong with Angry? first opened at the LOST Theatre in 1993 in Fulham, London, with an unpaid cast and crew of nearly 20, and an audience of only six. It wasn't until the gay press gave the show favourable reviews that audiences came in numbers, and the show sold out in the final week.

The show was then staged the following year at the Oval House in London, where it sold out and was extended for an extra week at the Battersea Arts Centre (BAC) Studio. After the final performance, film director Simon Shore and producer Steven Taylor approached Wilde about a film version, which Wilde went on to write the screenplay for.

In 1994 the show had another run at the BAC, this time in the main house. The following year it transferred to the West End, where it played at the Arts Theatre for eight weeks. What's Wrong With Angry? has played professionally in Copenhagen, Los Angeles, San Francisco and Chicago.

A new production, directed by Patrick Wilde himself, opened at the Edinburgh Festival Fringe on 30 July 2008 until 25 August. This was the first UK production of the play in 13 years, and was co-produced by Taggart creator, Glenn Chandler and Pete Shaw. The production then moved down to London, and was performed at The King's Head Theatre from 8 July – 16 August 2009 produced by Hartshorn-Hook.

== Sequel ==
In 2002 Wilde wrote a follow-up stage play, You Couldn't Make It Up. While strictly not a sequel to the original, You Couldn't Make It Up included two characters from What's Wrong with Angry?, John and Kevin, plus a small cameo appearance from Steven Carter. You Couldn't Make It Up premiered at the Gilded Balloon, Edinburgh during the Edinburgh Fringe 2002, and transferred to the New End Theatre, Hampstead in 2003. Both productions were produced by Pete Shaw.
