= Patrick Wilde =

English playwright, screenwriter, actor and director

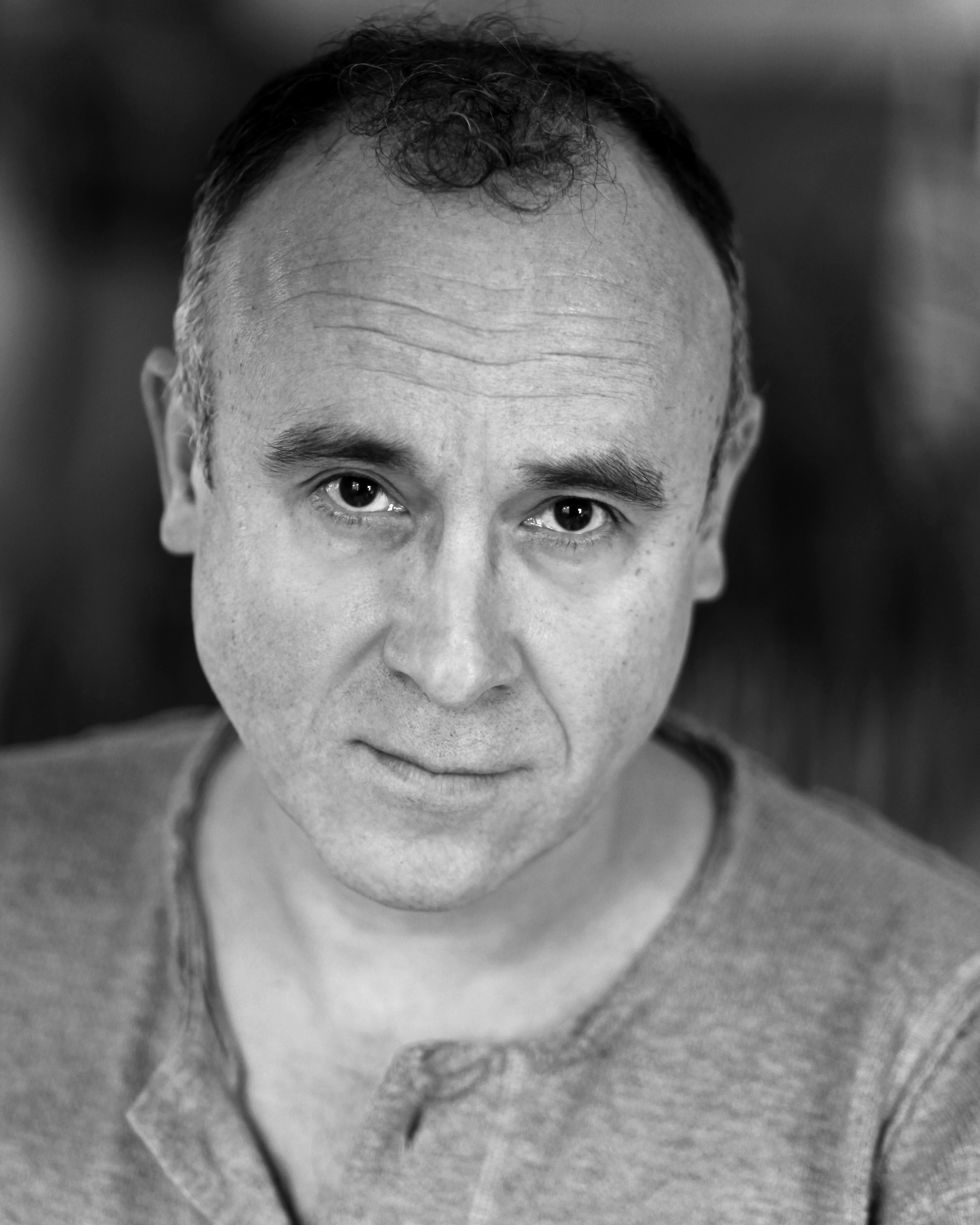
- Born: London, England, United Kingdom
- Occupations: Playwright and screenwriter
- Writing career
- Years active: 1980–present
- Website: www.patrickwilde.com www.pwexec.com

Patrick Wilde is an English playwright, screenwriter, actor, and director for television, film and theatre.

== Early work ==
Most of Wilde's early work was centred on the classics. He played Hamlet, Mark Antony for ATC and Amnon in Tirso de Molina's Rape of Tamar at the Lyric Theatre in London. He directed several productions of Shakespeare, as well as the British premiere of Schiller's Cabal and Love at the Lyric. He directed for The British Council in Pakistan, the production in question causing a near riot (including gunfire in the street) for its 'scandalous depiction of women through the ages'.

== Edinburgh Fringe ==
Wilde has worked several times over the years at the Edinburgh Fringe Festival, including productions of Twelfth Night, The Taming of the Shrew and most notably his collaboration with writer Jonathan Rich to construct and direct Sell Out! He has also presented one of his own plays in Edinburgh (You Couldn't Make It Up), and his first feature film, Get Real, won a prize at the Edinburgh Film Festival.

== The Wild Justice Company ==
In 1993 he set up Wild Justice Company, originally to present his first play, What's Wrong with Angry? Wilde wrote the play because he "was sick of being told by people — even gay people — that it's easier to be gay now... But [he didn't] believe it's easier than it ever was to come out." This age of consent drama began at a small fringe theatre in London, but moved from there to the Oval house, then BAC and eventually to a successful run at The Arts in Leicester Square. It has since played in Europe, Los Angeles and San Francisco, and was selected by readers of The Purple Circuit to be one of the most influential gay and lesbian plays.

On the back of this success, Wilde was commissioned to write the film version, Get Real, which was directed by Simon Shore and went on to win several major awards, including both jury and audience prizes at the Dinard Festival of British Cinema, The Sydney Mardi Gras Film Award and the audience prize at the Edinburgh Film Festival. It was also selected to play at The Sundance Film Festival.

== Television Scriptwriting ==
Patrick's writing career took off, and alongside writing for such TV staples as Casualty, Holby City, EastEnders, Monarch of The Glen and Peak Practice he was also part of the creative team on more ground breaking shows such as City Central, As If and most notably, This Life.

Wilde has also written the screenplay for Paul Monette's Becoming A Man: Half A Life Story, although it has yet to make it into production.

== Recent work ==
Having linked up with producer Pete Shaw, Patrick's directing and writing careers now continued in tandem, including a second feature film, Things To Do Before You're 30 and stage play, You Couldn't Make It Up. The latter was produced by Shaw under the Wild Justice banner and played to sell out houses at The Gilded Balloon in 2002, and then transferred to the New End in London. It featured the Jailbait single 'Hey, Kids!', as well as other music written by Julian Butler and Stephen Butler.

At the end of 2006, Wilde collaborated with Sir Tim Rice on a new version of his musical, Blondel, which he directed for at The Pleasance in London. Despite the limited run, Wilde proved the show could find a new audience more than 20 years after it had been seen on a professional stage.

In 2009 Wilde revived and directed What's Wrong with Angry? again, this time at the King's Head Theatre in Islington, to another successful run. The Stage notes that "What's Wrong With Angry played an important part in the development of gay theatre at the end of the last century. Whilst Wilde is keen to point out in his notes that intolerance is as strong as it ever was, this play's edge has been lost."^{1}. Wilde also found time to direct Scott Mills - The Musical for BBC Radio 1 at the Pleasance as part of their appearance at the Edinburgh Festival Fringe.

In 2010 Wilde directed the West End run of Tribute to the Blues Brothers at the Arts Theatre, Leicester Square, produced by Hartshorn-Hook. He also directed a new musical by Toby Herschmann and Kelly Kingham at the Edinburgh Festival Fringe call Jump. He continues to direct and write theatre, including LGBT projects The Band Plays On Festival at Greenwich Theatre and Outlaws to In-Laws, a dramatic representation of gay lives through seven decades.

Patrick has published a book, Time To Act, which is aimed at people from all professions especially high end executives, in which he outlines acting skills for use in other spheres of life. This comes after years of training and teaching actors, businessmen and others through courses and bespoke mentoring through his website.

== Writing Credits ==
- 1984 Stage (Part of Outlaws to In-Laws King's Head Theatre, 2012)
- A Quiet Courage Short Film (2014)
- Casualty Television (Unnamed, 2014)
- Holby City Television (Contra Mundum, 2013)
- Exposure Stage (LOST Theatre, 2012)
- Casualty Television (To Thine Own Self Be True, 2008)
- Casualty Television (No End of Blame, 2007)
- EastEnders Television (Episode dated 4 May 2007)
- The Bill Television (Episode 415, 2006)
- Family Affairs Television (Episode 15 November 2005)
- Things To Do Before You're 30 Film (2004)
- Holby City Television (As The Day Is London, 2003)
- You Couldn't Make It Up Stage (2002)
- Monarch of the Glen Television (Episode #2.4, 2001)
- Monarch of the Glen Television (Episode #1.6, 2000)
- As If Television (Episode #1.14, 2001)
- As If Television (Episode #1.3, 2001)
- Peak Practice Television (Change of Life, 1999)
- Peak Practice Television (Fighting Chance, 1999)
- Peak Practice Television (Comrades in Arms, 1999)
- Sunburn Television (1999)
- Casualty Television (Team Work, 1999)
- Casualty Television (Next of Kin, 1998)
- City Central Television (1998)
- Get Real Film (1998)
- This Life Television (Brief Encounter, 1996)
- This Life Television (Family Outing, 1996)
- What's Wrong with Angry? Stage (1993)
