= List of LGBTQ-related films of 2008 =

This is a list of lesbian, gay, bisexual, transgender or queer-related films released in 2008. It contains theatrically released films that deal with important gay, lesbian, bisexual, transgender or queer characters or issues and may have same-sex romance or relationships as a plot device.

== Films ==
Title	Director	Country	Genre	Cast	Notes
Affinity	Tim Fywell	United Kingdom; Romania; Canada	Drama, romance	Zoë Tapper, Anna Madeley, Domini Blythe, Amanda Plummer, Mary Jo Randle	TV movie, based on the novel of the same name by Sarah Waters
All My Life	Maher Sabry	Egypt	Drama	Mazen Nassar, Ayman, Jwana, Louay, Julian Gonzalez Esparza, Mehammed Amadeus and Maged	a.k.a. Toul omry
The Amazing Truth About Queen Raquela	Olaf de Fleur	Iceland; Philippines; France; Thailand	Comedy	Raquela Rios, Stefan Schaefer, Olivia Galudo, Brax Villa, Valerie Grand Einarsson	Winner of the Teddy Award for best feature film at the 58th Berlin International Film Festival
Ang Lihim ni Antonio	Joselito Altarejos	Philippines	Drama	Kenjie Garcia, Jiro Manio, Shamaine Centenera-Buencamino, Josh Ivan Morales, Ricky Ibe and Joey Deleon	
Another Gay Sequel: Gays Gone Wild!	Todd Stephens	United States; Germany	Comedy	Jonah Blechman, Jake Mosser, Aaron Michael Davies, Jimmy Clabots, Euriamis Losada, Perez Hilton, RuPaul, Scott Thompson	
Antique	Min Kyu-dong	South Korea	Comedy, drama	Ju Ji-hoon, Kim Jae-wook, Yoo Ah-in, Choi Ji-ho, Andy Gillet, Ko Chang-seok, Yeo Jin-goo	a.k.a. Sayangkoldong yangkwajajeom aentikeu; based on the manga Antique Bakery by Fumi Yoshinaga
Arizona Sky	Jeff London	United States	Drama	Eric Dean, Blaise Embry, Kyle Buckland, Jayme McCabe, Patricia Place, Evan Cuthbert, Brent King, Emerson Smith and Bernadette Murray	
The Baby Formula	Alison Reid	Canada	Comedy	Angela Vint, Megan Fahlenbock, Rosemary Dunsmore, Dmitry Chepovetsky, Maggie Cassella	
Be Like Others	Tanaz Eshaghian	Canada; Iran; United Kingdom; United States	Documentary	follows Iranian transsexuals having surgery, such as Ali Askar, a 24-year-old man (later Negar) and 20-year-old Anoosh (later Anahita)	Winner of the Teddy jury award at the 58th Berlin International Film Festival
Bi the Way	Brittany Blockman, Josephine Decker	United States	Documentary	five young Americans; former cheerleader Pam, hip-hop dancer Tahj, engaged Taryn, 24 year old David and Josh, 11 from Texas	
Born in 68	Olivier Ducastel, Jacques Martineau	France	Drama	Laetitia Casta, Yannick Renier, Yann Trégouët	a.k.a. Nés en 68
Boy Meets Boy	Kim Jho Gwangsoo	South Korea	Short, drama	Kim Hye-seong, Lee Hyun-jin, Ye Ji-won	
Brideshead Revisited	Julian Jarrold	United Kingdom; Italy; Morocco	Drama	Matthew Goode, Ben Whishaw, Hayley Atwell, Emma Thompson, Michael Gambon, Greta Scacchi, Patrick Malahide, Felicity Jones, Ed Stoppard, Jonathan Cake, Joseph Beattie, James Bradshaw	Based on the novel of the same name by Evelyn Waugh
Ciao	Yen Tan	United States	Drama	Adam Neal Smith, Alessandro Calza and Charles W. Blaum	
City Without Baseball	Lawrence Ah Mon	Hong Kong	Drama	Ron Heung Tze-Chun, Leung Yu-Chung, Yuan Lin, John Tai Ji-Ching, Monie Tung Man-Lee and Scud	aka Mou ye chi sing
The Color of Fame	Alejandro Bellame	Venezuela	Drama	Elaiza Gil, Alberto Alifa, Miguel Ferrari	
Comme les autres	Vincent Garenq	France	Drama	Lambert Wilson, Pilar López de Ayala, Pascal Elbé, Anne Brochet, Andrée Damant, Florence Darel and Marc Duret	aka Baby Love
The Country Teacher	Bohdan Sláma	Czech Republic; France; Germany	Drama	Pavel Liška, Zuzana Bydžovská	aka Venkovský učitel
Daybreak	Adolfo Alix Jr.	Philippines	Romance	Coco Martin, Paolo Rivero	
Deb and Sisi	Mark Kenneth Woods	Canada	Comedy	Mark Kenneth Woods, Michael Venus	
Dim Sum Funeral	Anna Chi	United States; Canada	Comedy, drama	Bai Ling, Steph Song, Talia Shire	
DINX	Trevor Anderson	Canada	Short comedy	Farren Timoteo	
Dostana	Tarun Mansukhani	India; United States	Comedy, drama	Abhishek Bachchan, John Abraham, Priyanka Chopra, Bobby Deol, Kirron Kher, Sushmita Mukherjee, Boman Irani	
Dream Boy	James Bolton	United States	Drama	Stephan Bender, Max Roeg, Randy Wayne, Owen Beckman, Thomas Jay Ryan, Diana Scarwid, Rooney Mara, Rickie Lee Jones	Based on the novel of the same name by Jim Grimsley
Drifting Flowers	Zero Chou	Taiwan	Drama	Pai Chih-Ying, Serena Fang	
A Frozen Flower	Yoo Ha	South Korea	Historical, drama	Zo In-sung, Joo Jin-mo, Song Ji-hyo, Shim Ji-ho, Lim Ju-hwan	aka Ssang-hwa-jeom; loosely based on the reign of Gongmin of Goryeo
Garden Party	Jason Freeland	United States	Drama	Vinessa Shaw, Willa Holland, Richard Gunn	
Heiko	David Bonneville	Portugal	Short, sci-fi	José Manuel Mendes	
I Can't Think Straight	Shamim Sarif	United Kingdom	Drama	Lisa Ray, Sheetal Sheth, Antonia Frering, Dalip Tahil, Ernest Ignatius, Siddiqua Akhtar and Amber Rose Revah	Directed and co-written by Shamim Sarif, based on her novel of the same name
Ice Blues	Ron Oliver	Canada; United States	Crime, drama, mystery	Chad Allen, Sebastian Spence	
James	Connor Clements	United Kingdom	Short, drama	Niall Wright	17 minutes long
J'ai rêvé sous l'eau	Hormoz	France	Drama	Hubert Benhamdine, Caroline Ducey, Christine Boisson, Hicham Nazzal, Franck Victor, Hélène Michel	a.k.a. I Dreamt Under the Water
Kiss the Bride	C. Jay Cox	United States	Comedy, romance	Tori Spelling, Philipp Karner	
Let the Right One In	Tomas Alfredson	Sweden	Horror, drama	Kåre Hedebrant, Lina Leandersson, Per Ragnar, Ika Nord, Peter Carlberg	a.k.a. Låt den rätte komma in; based on the novel of the same name by John Ajvide Lindqvist
The Lollipop Generation	G. B. Jones	Canada	Drama	Jena von Brücker, Marcus Ewert (credited as Mark Ewert)	
The Man Who Loved Yngve	Stian Kristiansen	Norway	Musical, drama	Rolf Kristian Larsen	a.k.a. Mannen som elsket Yngve; screenplay by Tore Renberg, based on his book of the same name
Milk	Gus Van Sant	United States	Drama	Sean Penn, Emile Hirsch, Josh Brolin, Diego Luna, Alison Pill, Victor Garber, Denis O'Hare, Joseph Cross, James Franco	Biopic of Harvey Milk
Mulligans	Chip Hale	Canada	Drama	Dan Payne, Thea Gill, Charlie David	
Noah's Arc: Jumping the Broom	Patrik-Ian Polk	United States; Canada	Drama	Darryl Stephens, Christian Vincent, Doug Spearman	
On the Other Hand, Death	Ron Oliver	United States; Canada	Crime, mystery, drama	Chad Allen, Sebastian Spence	
Otto; or Up with Dead People	Bruce La Bruce	Germany; Canada	Horror, comedy, drama	Jey Crisfar	
Patrik, Age 1.5	Ella Lemhagen	Sweden	Comedy, drama	Gustaf Skarsgård, Torkel Petersson, Tom Ljungman	
Pedro	Nick Oceano	United States	Drama	Alex Loynaz, Justina Machado, Hale Appleman	
Private Lessons	Joachim Lafosse	Belgium; France	Drama	Jonas Bloquet, Jonathan Zaccaï, Yannick Renier, Claire Bodson, Pauline Étienne, Anne Coesens, Johan Leysen, Thomas Coumans	a.k.a. Élève libre
Prodigal Sons	Kimberly Reed	United States	Documentary	About Kimberly Reed's family; Carol McKerrow (mother), Loren (father), Marc (adopted brother), Todd (brother) and Kimberly (formerly Paul)	
The Queen Is in the Factory	Ali Kemal Güven	Turkey	Drama, romance	Dicle Kartal, Çağrı Aslan, Şenol Demir, Fatih Günaydın, Umut Armağan, Hande Yener, Billur Kalkavan, Özgür Özberk	
Ready? OK!	James Vasquez	United States	Comedy	Michael Emerson, Carrie Preston, Lurie Poston	
Sex Positive	Daryl Wein	United States	Documentary	About Richard Berkowitz, interviews with; Dotty Berkowitz (his mother), Dr. Demetre Daskalakis, (actor) Richard Dworkin, William Haseltine, Larry Kramer, Ardele Lister, Michael Lucas, Francisco Roque, director of GMHC Gabriel Rotello, Dr. Joseph Sonnabend, Dr. Bill Stackhouse, Krishna Stone (GMHC worker) and Sean O. Strub	
Tomboy	Barb Taylor, Karleen Pendleton Jiménez	Canada	Animation	(Voice actors);Athena Karkanis, Alex Castillo, Michael D. Cohen, Sandi Ross, Julie Lemieux, Orville Maciel, Aaryn Doyle and Rebecca Brenner	Adapted from Jiménez's 2000 book Are You a Boy or a Girl?
Tru Loved	Stewart Wade	United States	Comedy, Drama	Najarra Townsend, Jake Abel, Michael Thompson, Alexandra Paul, Cynda Williams, Alec Mapa, Bruce Vilanch, Nichelle Nichols, Jasmine Guy, Jane Lynch, Elaine Hendrix, Tye Olson, Joseph Julian Soria, Tony Brown, Vernon Wells, Marcia Wallace	
Watercolors	David Oliveras	United States	Drama	Tye Olson, Kyle Clare	
Were the World Mine	Tom Gustafson	United States	Musical, comedy	Tanner Cohen, Wendy Robie, Judy McLane, Zelda Williams, Jill Larson, Ricky Goldman	
Wrangler: Anatomy of an Icon	Jeffrey Schwarz	United States	Documentary	Interviews with: Jack Wrangler, Margaret Whiting, Robert Alvarez (Filmmaker), Brooks Ashmanskas, Michael Bronski, Spring Byington, Gino Colbert (Adult Actor & Director), Durk Dehner, Samuel R. Delany, Michael Denneny (Friend and Christopher Street (magazine) editor), Jack Deveau (director of Porn films), Andy Devine, Casey Donovan, Jerry Douglas and Kevin Duda (actor)	
The Young and Evil	Julian Breece	United States	Short, drama	Vaughn Lowery, Mark Berry, Heather Halley	a.k.a. The Young & Evil
