= Vance and Pepe's Porn Start =

- Directed by: Mark Kenneth Woods
- Written by: Mark Kenneth Woods
- Produced by: Mark Kenneth Woods; Michael Venus
- Starring: Mark Kenneth Woods; Michael Venus; Ryan Steele; Rachelle Lachland
- Distributed by: MKW Productions
- Release date: August 20, 2011
- Running time: 53 minutes
- Country: Canada
- Language: English

Vance and Pepe's Porn Start is a comedic mockumentary directed by and starring Mark Kenneth Woods, and co-starring Michael Venus, Ryan Steele, and Rachelle Lachland. It had its debut at the Out On Screen Vancouver Queer Film Festival in August 2011. The DVD was released January 17, 2012 through MKW Productions and had its television broadcast debut on July 29, 2012, on OUTtv in Canada.

== Synopsis ==
In this mockumentary, Vance (Michael Venus) and Pepe (Mark Kenneth Woods), two hosts of a renowned reality makeover series, find out their show has been cancelled. Desperate for work, they anxiously devise a plan to use their fame to find new careers in the porn industry. Sensing a train wreck is near, a documentary crew follow the 'famous' reality TV duo as they try to create a film based on 'Showgirls' and 'Twilight' but find out that making it big in porn is a long and hard process.

== Cast ==
- Mark Kenneth Woods as Pepe Pérez
- Michael Venus as Vance Vanderbilt
- Ryan Steele as Dino Donovan
- Rachelle Lachland as Monica Montgomery
- Toban Ralston as Kurt Kidd
- Charlie David (voice) as Gavin Gallagher
- Rob Easton as Steve Stryker
- Warren Frey as Bartholomew Babcock
- Mel Siermaczescki as Daphne

== Titles ==
The film's title has also been shortened to "Vance and Pepe" and "Porn Start" for its original theatrical and television releases.

== Critical reception ==
The film received mixed reviews with Robert O'Neil of TLA Video praising the actors' performances as being in "complete commitment to their bizarre roles – especially Mark Kenneth Woods and Michael Venus, who would seem right at home on Saturday Night Live".
