= Gigolos =

Television series

- Title card from original trailer
- Genre: Reality
- Directed by: John D Downer
- Country of origin: United States
- Original language: English
- No. of seasons: 6
- No. of episodes: 60

Production
- Executive producers: Jay Blumenfield; Tom Forman; Tony Marsh; Brad Bishop; Marklen Kennedy; Richard Grieco
- Production location: Las Vegas
- Running time: 25 minutes
- Production company: RelativityReal

Original release
- Network: Showtime
- Release: April 7, 2011 – May 5, 2016

Gigolos is an American reality television series about the lives of five male escorts in Las Vegas. The series follows the men, all employees of the same escort agency, through their daily lives and interactions with each other. Cameras also follow the escorts on their appointments with women, including their sexual activity. The series debuted on the premium cable channel Showtime in 2011, and the final episode aired in 2016.

Gigolos was met with critical confusion regarding the legality of the activities it portrays and amazement that women would consent to being filmed purchasing sexual services. Critics were largely negative in the beginning, although a few had offered the series guarded praise.

== Cast ==
=== Main ===
- Nick Hawk: Mixed Martial Arts fighter and entrepreneur.
- Brace Land: The eldest escort and developing a product line that may allow him to retire from the business.
- Vin Armani: Guy with Big Dongle
- Steven Gantt (season 1–3): A single father who escorts to support his son.
- Jimmy Clabots (as Jimmy Dior) (season 1–2; guest season 3): An actor (Another Gay Sequel: Gays Gone Wild!) and personal trainer.
- Ash Armand (season 3–6): Described in publicity material as a "raven-haired hunk".
- Bradley Lords (season 4–6): A former Marine and self-professed "cougar magnet".

=== Recurring ===
- Garren James: Owner of the Cowboys4Angels escort service.

After season one was taped, sources reported that Steven and Jimmy had left Cowboys4Angels. Both men remained in the cast for season two.

== Production and development ==
Speaking at the January 2011 Television Critics Association press tour, Showtime entertainment president David Nevins told critics that the sexually explicit Gigolos was part of an overall vision for the network. "We are a pay cable service and I think it's about doing things with some depth and sophistication and taking people places they couldn't go on other networks."

Showtime ordered a second season of eight episodes and it debuted October 20, 2011. Showtime renewed the series for a third season to begin filming June 2012, but announced it would be without Jimmy Clabots. Season three premiered August 30, 2012. Season four began filming in Las Vegas January 16, 2013 and premiered April 18th, 2013. Season 5 premiered on January 23, 2014.

Showtime has renewed Gigolos for a sixth season. On March 21, 2015, it was announced that the sixth season would begin shooting that April, and that they were looking for some couples and women to cast in the show. The final episode of Gigolos aired in 2016.

== Legality ==
Outside of legalized brothels located away from metropolitan areas, prostitution is illegal in Nevada, carrying a penalty of a $1,000 fine and up to six months in jail. In the premiere episode, James explains the "legal fig leaf" under which the service operates to new hire Vin: "We are a companion service and clients pay a rate per hour. First thing you're gonna do is collect the money from the client and then from there, whatever happens between you two is two consenting adults. It's illegal for you to take any money after that for any sort of sexual services or whatever." The closing credits include disclaimers: everyone shown having sex on-camera is of legal age; and "No one depicted in this program was remunerated in exchange for engaging in sexual activity."

Las Vegas Police spokesperson Marcus Martin disputed the legality of the sexual activity in an interview with the Las Vegas Review-Journal. "They can play the line as loose as they want to, semantically, but they're still violating the law." Since the recorded conduct did not occur in front of an officer it does not constitute an arrestable offense, although there could be "repercussions" in the future, according to Martin.

== Legitimacy ==
Questions have been raised about the legitimacy of the series and whether the men on it are really working prostitutes. The Daily Beast located one woman who appeared on the series who stated that the show is entirely fictional and that the sex is simulated. "They found me through a website. They wanted to know what skills I had. Then they created a scenario where I would need an escort, and they hired me." She looks upon her appearance as an acting job. She does, however, believe that the men are really prostitutes. Vin Armani stated that the men really do work as gigolos but believes that none of them actually live in Las Vegas.

According to James, the women who appeared in the series did not pay for their time with the escorts and in fact were compensated for their appearances. Some of the women were previous clients of his service, while he recruited others. He refused to say exactly how much the women were paid other than saying it was a "small sum". Some have also observed that certain women portrayed in the series were actually pornographic actresses playing the role of a housewife, singer or model. James stated that while the men really are gigolos, they do not escort full-time. "Most of my men have other jobs. They see clients at night and on weekends. Most go to castings as models and actors or have personal training gigs. Women tend to book longer appointments so only seeing two clients per week for four hours at a time is $2,000 per week. Lots of guys get booked at least once a month for a weekend at $5,000 as the fee. Yes, most of the men can make a very good living off just doing this alone but they have so much free time to pursue other things so they usually do."

== Episodes ==
Season	Episodes	Originally aired	
Season	Episodes	Series premiere	Series finale
1	8	April 7, 2011	May 26, 2011
2	8	October 20, 2011	December 8, 2011
3	10	August 30, 2012	November 1, 2012
4	10	April 18, 2013	June 20, 2013
5	10	January 23, 2014	March 27, 2014
6	8	March 17, 2016	May 5, 2016

=== Season 1 (2011) ===
No.	Title	Original air date	Synopsis
1	"Date Night"	April 7, 2011	Manager Garren James hires his newest escort, Vin, and explains the business. Nick Hawk has a date with a teacher from out of town. Jimmy services a married woman for her birthday as her husband watches and offers encouragement. An older woman interviews the men to choose one to escort her to a Black and White Ball. The men bet on who she will choose and Steven wins. The boys welcome Vin to their ranks.
2	"All 4 One"	April 14, 2011	Steven, needing money to send his son to summer camp, books two new clients, including a very large woman he connects with through Jimmy. The rest of the guys visit a psychic and Brace is particularly affected by her reading. Later the four decide to service a client simultaneously and turn over their combined fee to Steve. Despite instituting a "no fluids or skin touching but the client's" rule, once at the client's place Brace is unwilling to participate. Steven is grateful for their gesture.
3	"Release the Kraken!"	April 21, 2011	Brace wants to transition from escort to entrepreneur with an anti-aging dietary supplement but after a meeting with a supplement company he realizes he has much more work to do. Nick meets with a new client who tries to push him past his limits. Jimmy's new client is a budding dominatrix who outfits him with a "cock cage" that he wears for several days.
4	"Three Gigolos and a Baby"	April 28, 2011	A married couple hires Nick to service the wife as a trade-off for the wife's hiring a woman for her husband. She enjoys herself but her husband is uncomfortable with the situation. Jimmy cooks dinner for his girlfriend Kelly, whom he told about his escorting career after a month together. Later two of his college friends come to town for a bachelorette party. One has kids and she leaves them with Nick, Vin and Steven. Brace begs off baby-sitting by saying he has a client but in reality he treats himself to a spa day. Jimmy tells his friends that he escorts and they are both supportive.
5	"Dance Dance Gigoloution"	May 5, 2011	Jimmy reports that Kelly has broken up with him, jealous of the women he services. The guys do a photo shoot to update the Cowboys4Angels website. Brace's growing guilt and unease over being a gigolo lead him to seek solace, first from a priest, then from a former female escort. Jimmy and a client have sex in a limousine. A client hires Vin to dance with her in a salsa competition and they take third place.
6	"Birthday Sex"	May 12, 2011	Steven reminds the guys that they have forgotten his birthday. To make it up to him they take him to a shooting range and then to a go-kart track but he remains morose. Finally they set him up with a regular client of Jimmy's and, during their session, surprise him with a cake which he then has sex with at the client's request. Jimmy has an appointment with an executive in her office. Nick experiences some stomach problems so Brace takes him to get a colonic, which Nick does not enjoy.
7	"One Shot, One Opportunity"	May 19, 2011	Nick gets a chance to perform his original rap song for a music producer. The producer is impressed and wants to work with him in Los Angeles. Brace teaches a shy housewife how to be more aggressive for her husband. Steven meets a new client whose fetish is simulating being dead during sex. Vin's client wants the "boyfriend experience".
8	"The Ties That Unbind"	May 26, 2011	Vin services a wife while her husband tapes them for their private pornography collection. Later he has relationship issues with his girlfriend, Leilani, when she asks him to move with her to Arizona. Fed up with Jimmy's slovenly ways and constant didgeridoo playing, Nick orders him to move out.

=== Season 2 (2011) ===
No.	Title	Original air date	Synopsis
1	"Gigo-loan"	October 20, 2011	In the Season 2 premiere, Brace is hired by an uninhibited 36-year-old for a wild marathon date; Vin helps ease the pain of a lonely woman; Jimmy copes with a personal crisis.
2	"Get Down on the Strip"	October 27, 2011	Steven pleasures a client in public; Nick gears up for his first live rap performance; Jimmy must choose between coming through for a client or making it to his best friend's big night.
3	"The Boyfriend Experience"	November 3, 2011	A woman confuses Steven's services for a real relationship; Brace faces the possibility of fatherhood; Vin considers asking his long-distance girlfriend to move in.
4	"Really Smooth Operators"	November 10, 2011	Steven is reunited with his first girlfriend; the other guys explore a new "manscaping" technique; Brace grants a bucket list wish for a woman diagnosed with cancer.
5	"Poker? Heck Yeah, I'll Poker"	November 17, 2011	Brace gets Botox injections before servicing a professional poker player. Vin is booked by a lesbian as a birthday present for her bisexual girlfriend and they have a threesome. Jimmy shoots a music video for Nick's song. Heather Marianna from the Bravo reality show, Tour Group, is featured as a client on this episode.
6	"An Ex Marks the Spot"	November 24, 2011	Brace's ex-wife, her twin sister and her sister's ex-husband visit Brace, hoping he will be able to release the lingering anger from the marriage. Nick's client is a dominatrix who hires him to dominate her. Steven services the friend of a bride who refused his services at her bridal shower.
7	"Giggle-O's	December 1, 2011	Vin takes on a female bodybuilder as a client, then his mother visits for his birthday. Jimmy tries his hand at stand-up comedy. Initially he falters and attracts a heckler, but he rallies and starts getting laughs.
8	"Brotherly Love"	December 8, 2011	Nick's brother visits Las Vegas and declares his interest in becoming a gigolo. Vin meets fellow escort and adult film star Zeb Atlas. Later he sacrifices sex with his girlfriend to be ready to service a client. Brace's appointment takes an unexpected turn when he discovers that his client is transgender.

=== Season 3 (2012) ===
No.	Title	Original air date	Synopsis
1	"The Steven Clown Affair"	August 30, 2012	Vin's session with an event promoter sees him trying out a new vibrating sex toy, which wanders off in the middle of things. Brace meets a spray tanning technician who exchanges spray tanning for sexual favors. After missing an appointment, Jimmy calls Garren to report that he is leaving the agency at his new girlfriend's request. Steven's client is a children's party planner and he indulges her clown fetish by donning whiteface and clown shoes. Garren brings in a new gigolo, Ash.
2	"Searching for a Fire Power"	September 6, 2012	Ash has his first session following his relocation to Las Vegas, with Bambu, a professional fire dancer. Later she invites him to a show and suggests they perform together. Nick has a mold made of his penis to launch a line of Nick Hawk sex toys. Ash meets with Garren, who expresses concern over the fire dancing idea; Ash thinks by performing he can turn Bambu into a repeat client. Brace takes a client shopping for a vibrator and edible underwear and services her in the back of a limousine. Nick has a session with an animal lover and is unnerved by her array of exotic pets.
3	"Ride Her, Cowboy"	September 13, 2012	Ash meets a client and convinces her to have sex in a public restroom. Garren sends the gigolos to a dude ranch to compete for a date with a wealthy rodeo rider, leading Brace to confront his childhood fear of horses. Nick wins the competition and the date.
4	"Grin & Bear It"	September 20, 2012	Nick's horseplay aggravates an old back injury of Brace's. Brace takes his revenge by setting Nick up with a furry client. Steven helps a client assemble and test out a sex swing. Vin services a recent divorcée looking for her first sexual experience after her marriage.
5	"Courtesan Session"	September 27, 2012	Vin teams with two female escorts to entertain a voyeuristic couple for their anniversary. He later meets with a group of female escorts to discuss developing a software program to increase their safety. To pay Brace back for the furry prank, Nick enlists Garren to trick Brace into believing he has a client who wants him dressed in full drag. Brace gets dressed up to meet the "client" in a bar only to be met by the other gigolos instead.
6	"Spanks a Lot"	October 4, 2012	Ash takes a class in domination to learn how to handle a client who is into submission. He arranges for all of the gigolos to take some training in both the dominant and submissive roles. Brace and Nick overindulge in partying and employ a mobile detoxification service to recover. Garren sets up the stable with a woman who wants to become a regular client. Nick impresses her and wins the assignment.
7	"Black C*** Down"	October 11, 2012	Darkness descends on Vegas when a client refuses to hire Vin because he is not "black enough." To please the client, Garren summons a new Gigolo to Vegas, which leads to a discussion on race amongst the guys. Meanwhile, Steven goes head-to-head with his nicotine addiction when Brace bets him $1,000 that he cannot quit smoking for one week.
8	"A Decent Proposal"	October 18, 2012	Steven contemplates a long term job that would take him on a European tour. Vin is tasked with pleasuring a lesbian client who hasn't been with a man in years.
9	"Lock, Stock & Two Swollen Testicles"	October 25, 2012	Steven is confronted by a client's jealous boyfriend. Ash's date teaches him some spicy salsa moves. Meanwhile, Brace considers undergoing a vasectomy.
10	"Gigolos"	November 1, 2012	Brace decides to get testosterone injections and Nick considers going into the adult film industry.

=== Season 4 (2013) ===
No.	Title	Original air date	Synopsis
1	"A New Direction"	April 18, 2013	The best in the business are back for another season of tricks and treats. There's a new man in their midst, a former Marine who makes the others step up their game. The heat is on for these hard working, hard playing guys on and off the Las Vegas Strip.
2	"Bro-Choice"	April 25, 2013	Brace is hired by a woman with an unusual past. Ash is visited by a classical violinist client. Bradley informs his conservative brother about his new career.
3	"The Spurt Locker"	May 2, 2013	Bradley asks for help from the other guys when he's challenged to surpass a client's wildest fantasy. Brace and Ash go to a yoga session.
4	"Make Mine a Double"	May 9, 2013	Brace is worried regarding a client's intentions after she hires him and Nick. Ash spices things up by teaching a client about tantric sex.
5	"Don't Judge a Gigolo by His Cover"	May 16, 2013	The crew competes to win a calendar cover by participating in an intelligence test. Brace helps a client overcome personal issues.
6	"Just for Licks"	May 23, 2013	Vin goes to the dark side to achieve a client's fantasy. Ash and his life partner discuss an open relationship.
7	"And the Winner Is..."	May 30, 2013	Nick gets ready to AVN Awards and meet with one of his biggest fans. Vin's date has an obsession with calcium.
8	"Smell of Success"	June 6, 2013	Ash and Vin discuss collaborating on a cologne business venture together. Brace is met with an aggressive client and Nick receives a weird request.
9	"Smile for the Camera"	June 13, 2013	Garren meets with the group to shoot a promotional video. Vin's recent client is a retired art teacher who needs a boost in her life.
10	"Finale"	June 20, 2013	In the Season 4 finale, Vin and Ash work to keep Bradley in Las Vegas and Brace marries his friend.

=== Season 5 (2014) ===
Season 5 premiered on January 23, 2014.

No.	Title		
1	"Creative Outlet"	January 23, 2014	Nick's date wants to clear things up; Ash helps counsel a client; Brace has unattached fun.
2	"Centaur"	January 30, 2014	Brace's date has a fetish for a bygone era; Ash searches for answers to his sleeplessness.
3	"Officer Nick Hawk"	February 6, 2014	Brace encourages a client to expand her horizons; Nick shows off his mustache.
4	"Rap Battle"	February 13, 2014	Nick challenges Vin to a rap battle; Bradley is bold on his date.
5	"RIP Zeus"	February 20, 2014	When Brace struggles with a rough patch, the guys offer support; Bradley forces himself into a new role.
6	"Buff Bagwell"	February 27, 2014	Wrestler Buff Bagwell wants to try his hand at being a gigolo; Ash gets into a client's fantasy.
7	"Pole a Palooza"	March 6, 2014	Nick learns not to challenge a stripper; Vin tries a new business; Brace is beaten.
8	"Professor Brace"	March 13, 2014	The group embarks on a new chapter; Nick prepares for a photo shoot; a married couple spices up their relationship with Vin's help.
9	"Top Gun"	March 20, 2014	A date takes Bradley on a fighter plane over the Las Vegas skyline; Nick participates in a marksmanship duel.
10	"Vin Learns to Swim"	March 27, 2014	Nick teaches Vin how to swim; Brace goes commercial; Bradley contends with his baggage.

=== Season 6 (2016) ===
Season 6 premiered on March 17, 2016.

No.	Title		
1	"I Popped Your Nervous Cherry"	March 17, 2016	Vin has a special date and proves that good things come in small packages.
2	"Double Date"	March 24, 2016	Nick paints the town an array of colors; Brace is roped into an all-strings attached fantasy.
3	"Brace's Nephews"	March 31, 2016	Brace's nephews visit, and the guys realize that they are similar to their uncle; Nick mentors a new gigolo; Bradley makes a mess.
4	"The Ringmaster"	April 7, 2016	Brace helps Nick make his boyhood dream a reality; Bradley takes care of a woman who has faced death; Ash is shot.
5	"Monkey Business"	April 14, 2016	Brace goes wild while helping his friend; Ash's client asks him to take bold strides.
6	"A Little Country in You"	April 21, 2016	Nick breaks hearts with his debut track; Bradley and Brace clean up for their dates; Vin spends time with his brother.
7	"Ultimate Warrior"	April 28, 2016	Brace is nervous with a new lady; when his date becomes a liability, Nick takes measures for extra protection.
8	"Brace Tries Pulling Out"	May 5, 2016	Brace tries pulling out, but the guys give him a hard time; Bradley is lapped by his date; Ash is feeling itchy.

== Critical response ==
In a somewhat more positive review for Variety, Brian Lowry thought that "the series proves reasonably compelling while relying on typical tricks of the trade". Expressing the same amazement that people signed releases to appear on the series, Lowry concludes that even a cynical viewer can find something about Gigolos to admire, even if begrudgingly.

Salon's Tracy Clark-Flory wondered whether the usual blurring between fiction and reality on reality television had been blurred by Gigolos to the point of pornography. Despite acknowledging how the worlds of pornography and reality television have already blended, she still found that Gigolos' "genre confusion creates a jarring dissonance" and that its combination of explicit sex scenes with the staples of reality television (e.g. confessional interview segments) "makes for a confusing mix of contradictory cultural expectations".

Claire Zulkey of The A.V. Club graded the first episode a B. She found that the sex scenes have "a certain clinical feel" and that the non-sexual scenes are "odd and stiff", with the scenes in which viewers learn more about the escorts being the least interesting. Gigolos, she concludes, is the show to watch for those who want to see sex but don't want to watch an actual pornographic film.

== See also ==
- Male prostitution in the arts
