= Michael Yerxa =

Canadian documentary filmmaker

Michael Yerxa is a Canadian documentary filmmaker. He is most noted for his collaborations with Mark Kenneth Woods, including the films Take Up the Torch (2015) and Two Soft Things, Two Hard Things (2016), and the television series Pride.

Originally from Hampton, New Brunswick, he attended Kennebecasis Valley High School. Active in the theatre program, he won a student theatre award from Theatre New Brunswick in 2000 for his play Small Actors. He then studied theatre at Queen's University, appearing in theatre productions including The Music Man and City of Angels, before moving to Toronto, where he became known as one of the regular panelists on 1 Girl 5 Gays.

In addition to his filmmaking, Yerxa has also worked in casting, including credits on the film Porcupine Lake and the television series The Amazing Race Canada, Splatalot! and The Adventures of Napkin Man. He received a Canadian Screen Award nomination for Best Casting in a Television Series at the 8th Canadian Screen Awards in 2020 for his work on The Amazing Race Canada, the first time in the history of the awards that a reality show was nominated in that category.

He was a story producer on the 2020 series Canada's Drag Race.
