= Two Soft Things, Two Hard Things =

- Directed by: Mark Kenneth Woods; Michael Yerxa
- Written by: Mark Kenneth Woods; Michael Yerxa
- Produced by: Mark Kenneth Woods; Michael Yerxa
- Starring: Alethea Arnaquq-Baril; Jack Anawak; Jesse Mike; Nuka Fennell
- Distributed by: MKW Productions
- Release date: June 3, 2016
- Running time: 71 minutes
- Country: Canada
- Language: English/Inuktitut

Two Soft Things, Two Hard Things is a Canadian documentary film, written, produced and directed by Mark Kenneth Woods and Michael Yerxa, which debuted at the Inside Out Film and Video Festival on June 3, 2016. The film was produced by MKW Productions and was shot in Nunavut.

== Synopsis ==
The film explores the small but burgeoning community of LGBT Inuit living in Nunavut, amidst the backdrop of the establishment of an LGBT Pride festival in the territorial capital of Iqaluit; the event took place just months after Iqaluit participated in the national campaign of raising and displaying the pride flag on public buildings for the duration of the 2014 Winter Olympics to protest anti-LGBT laws in Russia, which set off an extended territory-wide debate about the role of homosexuality in Inuit culture.

The film explores various perspectives on the historical context of LGBT identity and sexuality among the Inuit, including the cultural and religious influence of the Roman Catholic Church on traditional Inuit spirituality and society. According to Inuit elders, the concepts of LGBT identity and long-term same-sex relationships were not known among the Inuit, but same-sex sexual activity was common and accepted — particularly as a remedy for social and sexual isolation during the annual period when men and women were segregated from each other by the gender roles imposed by the traditional hunting season — until Catholicism emerged as a dominant influence on Inuit society in the 1950s.

Figures appearing in the film include filmmaker Alethea Arnaquq-Baril, politicians Jack Anawak and Paul Okalik, and activists Allison Brewer, Nuka Fennell and Jesse Mike.

The film takes its name from the Inuktitut language words for lesbian and gay, which literally translate as "two soft things rubbing together" and "two hard things rubbing together", respectively.
