= Sally Steele =

American journalist

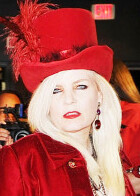
- Steele at the 2012 Vegas Rocks! Magazine Music Awards
- Born: Sally Craig; Indianapolis, Indiana, U.S.
- Occupations: Journalist; film maker; actor; musician
- Employer: vegasrocks.com
- Known for: Founder, CEO and editor-in-chief of Vegas Rocks! Magazine

Sally Steele (née Craig) is the publisher, founder, CEO and editor-in-chief of Vegas Rocks! Magazine. She also contributes as the head writer and photographer. Steele began her early career in photography and later spent time in various music projects and acting roles.

== Early life ==
Steele was born and raised in Indiana and took her first interest in rock and roll music as a young child while watching The Beatles Animated Series which aired in the mid-1960s. At age 14, Steele started photographing celebrities and rock bands such as Kiss, Aerosmith and Black Sabbath. At age 16, Steele started singing in local rock bands and after high school, she moved to Japan to play in a cover band for a brief tour. After one year of select performances, Steele decided to relocate to the vibrant rock scene which was taking place on the Sunset Strip in Hollywood, California during the early 1980s.

== Career ==
While in Hollywood, Steele pursued a career in music and acting. She did several bit parts in movies and television and also starred in several music videos which included "Little Lady" by Duke Jupiter and "Hungry Eyes" by Eric Carmen. She also had her own music video featured on MTV's Basement Tapes in 1988. In the early 1990s, when the glam metal genre was in decline, Steele moved to Nashville for a short while before relocating again to Las Vegas. Steele attempted stand-up comedy, played guitar when she could and worked as a cocktail waitress before becoming a chauffeur.

"I picked up Alice Cooper one day, and I was driving 100 miles an hour, looking in the back seat, asking him 10 million questions about every song he did. It really put the thought in my head, 'Well, I should do something with these questions.' "

Steele appeared in a reality series for VH1 (TV show) VH1 called Supergroup along with Scott Ian, Ted Nugent, Evan Seinfeld, Sebastian Bach and Jason Bonham in 2006.

Steele was featured in a prominent part of the Quiet Riot documentary Well Now that You're Here There's No Way Back which appeared on the Showtime network in 2014.

In 2016, Steele decided to compile all of her "Hollywood Memory" stories which were the most popular page in her VEGAS ROCKS! Publication for her first book "Rock N' Roll Nun"- True Tales of a Hollywood "Almost". Her memoirs detail life in Hollywood in the 1980s Hair metal era of the Sunset Strip. A book release party was held on October 14, 2016, and featured The Stephen Pearcy Band, Mark Boals, Andrew Freeman and many others. Robin Leach writes the foreword saying: "….Sally Steele saw the good, the bad, the beautiful and the ugly of living in Hollywood in its rock and roll heydaze! Sally makes you feel you are right alongside her – and that's great writing…".

== Vegas Rocks! Magazine ==
In 2004, Steele founded Vegas Rocks! Magazine with no publishing experience and no start-up money. She gathered content for her first issue at the Van's Warped Tour with a camera and a tape recorder she purchased the night before. Steele interviewed the artists, wrote all the articles and took all the photos for the first issue which was released in August 2004 and was a 14-page newspaper originally titled Las Vegas Rock City News. The title was permanently changed to Vegas Rocks! Magazine in January 2005 when she founded Vegas Rocks Media, LLC. Steele has continued to publish the magazine for over ten years with over 120 consecutive issues. Vegas Rocks! Magazine has grown from a 16-page black and white 'zine to a glossy, full-color, 50-page monthly publication. It features calendars of club dates and concerts, ads for local bands, record labels, recording studios and music venues such as House of Blues and The Hard Rock Cafe

== Film career ==
"Raised on Rock- The Burnette Family Legacy" was released and distributed worldwide by Indie Rights Movies in 2022. Sally directed, produced and wrote the film which starred Mick Fleetwood, Gary Busey, Slim Jim Phantom, Albert Lee, Dwight Twilley, James Intveld, Billy Burnette and Rocky Burnette. The film gathered substantial awards from several independent film festivals including: Action on Film International, LA Femme International Film Festival and the French Riviera Film Festival. Some awards for her films include: "Best Picture", "Best Female Director for a Documentary", "Best Cinematography", "Best Rogue Documentary" and others.

== Music career ==
Sally Steele released her self-titled album "Sally Steele" in 2024. It features 6 tracks recorded from 1988 to 1989. The album was released on CD and purple vinyl by Cleopatra Records. Band members featured on the album include: Dallas Keith, Gaylon, Greg Capes, J.C. Berdoo, Randy Richards, Todd Capes, Tracy Ferrie and Sally Steele.

== Vegas Rocks! Magazine Awards ==
In 2010 Steele hosted, created and produced the 1st Annual Vegas Rocks! Magazine Awards. With help from musicians including Dee Snider, Lita Ford, James Kottak, Lemmy Kilmister, Glenn Hughes and many others, it was the first of her Vegas Rocks! Magazine Awards shows in Las Vegas. The Vegas Rocks! Music Awards is now an annual event which takes place each year in August and simultaneously recognizes the anniversary of Vegas Rocks! Magazine.

The 2nd Annual Vegas Rocks! Magazine Music Awards was held on August 21, 2011, at the Las Vegas Hilton. It honored Vince Neil (Mötley Crüe), Steve Stevens (Billy Idol), John 5 (Rob Zombie/Marilyn Manson), Carmine Appice (Vanilla Fudge), Wayne Static (Static-X) and featured Sebastian Bach, Slim Jim Phantom (The Stray Cats), Lemmy Kilmister, Steven Adler (Guns N' Roses), Matt Sorum (Guns N' Roses), Gilby Clarke, Little Anthony, Gilbert Gottfried and many others.

The 3rd Annual Vegas Rocks! Magazine Music Awards took place Sunday, August 26, 2012, at The Joint inside the Hard Rock Hotel and Casino (Las Vegas). Guests honored included: Sammy Hagar, David Coverdale (Whitesnake), Geoff Tate (Queensrÿche), Mark Kendall (Great White), Michael Schenker (Scorpions), Blas Elias (Slaughter), Vinnie Paul (Pantera), Kip Winger (Winger), Marq Torien (Bullet Boys), Eddie Trunk (VH1 That Metal Show), Dead Sara and others. The 2012 VRMA Awards were broadcast internationally to a live audience on AXS TV.

The 4th Annual 2013 Vegas Rocks! Magazine Music Awards took place Sunday, August 25 at the Joint inside the Hard Rock Hotel and Casino. Guests honored included, DJ Ashba, Carl Palmer (Asia/ Emerson, Lake and Palmer), Jon Anderson (Yes), Zakk Wylde (Ozzy Osbourne/ Black Label Society), Jordan Rudess (Dream Theater), Geoff Tate's Queensrÿche, Chris Holmes (W.A.S.P.), Simon Wright (AC/DC), Rudy Sarzo, Robert Sarzo and many others. The Vegas Rocks! Music Awards was streamed live to a worldwide audience on AXS TV.

The 5th Annual Vegas Rocks! Magazine Music Awards took place Sunday November 23, 2014, at the Pearl Concert Theater inside Palms Hotel and Casino. Many high-profile guests were honored and attended including Nicolas Cage, Flavor Flav, Michael Anthony (Van Halen/ Chickenfoot), Steve Lukather & David Paich (Toto), Stephen Pearcy (Ratt), John 5, Rudy Sarzo, Danny Koker (Counting Cars) and many others.

The Vegas Rocks! Magazine Hair Metal Awards took place at the Eastside Cannery Sunday, May 15, 2016. Guests honored and attending included Scorpions, Twisted Sister, Quiet riot, Winger, Doro Pesch, Rudy Sarzo, BulletBoys, Criss Angel, Angel (American band), Brian Tichy, Pretty Boy Floyd, and was hosted by Nick Hawk and Steele.

The 7th Annual Vegas Rocks! Magazine Music Awards took place Sunday January 21, 2024 at Sam's Town in Las Vegas, NV. Honored guests included: Billy Gibbons from ZZ Top, Rick Nielsen of Cheap Trick, Buck Dharma and Eric Bloom of Blue Öyster Cult, Kip Winger, Orianthi, Rikki Rockett of Poison, Five Finger Death Punch, Count's 77 featuring Danny Koker, Blas Elias of Slaughter, Lizzy Borden, Simon Wright of AC/DC, Marco Mendoza, Tim Owens of Judas Priest and many others.
