= Vegas Rocks! Magazine =

Rock music magazine

VEGAS ROCKS! Magazine
- Editor: Sally Steele
- Categories: Music magazine
- Frequency: Bimonthly
- Founder: Sally Steele
- Founded: 2004
- First issue: August 2004
- Company: Vegas Rocks Media LLC.
- Country: United States
- Based in: Las Vegas
- Language: English
- Website: vegasrocks.com

VEGAS ROCKS! Magazine is a rock music magazine founded in August 2004 by Sally Steele. It covers rock music currently on showcase in the Las Vegas, NV area especially '80s rock music artists. Vegas Rocks! Magazine is a bi-monthly publication available in print in the Las Vegas, NV area and also in select areas of California and Arizona, and online. Beginning in 2010, the magazine began hosting its yearly "Vegas Rocks! Magazine Music Awards" event in order to honor rock musicians.

== History ==
Vegas Rocks! Magazine started in August 2004. Its first issue covered the Van's Warped Tour and was a 14-page newspaper originally titled Las Vegas Rock City News. The title was later changed to Vegas Rocks! Magazine in January 2005 Steele founded Vegas Rocks Media, LLC. Vegas Rocks! Magazine has gone from a 16-page black and white 'zine to a glossy, full-color, 50-page bimonthly publication. It features calendars of club dates and concerts, ads for local bands, record labels, recording studios and music venues.

== VEGAS ROCKS! Magazine Music Awards ==
VEGAS ROCKS! Magazine produces and hosts the VEGAS ROCKS! Magazine Music Awards.

List of Vegas Rocks! Magazine Music awards
Award	Date	Venue	Notes	Ref.
1st Annual Vegas Rocks! Magazine Music Awards	August 22, 2010	Las Vegas Hilton, Winchester, Nevada	Guests honored included: Lemmy Kilmister (Motörhead), Lita Ford, Dee Snider (Twisted Sister), Glenn Hughes (Deep Purple and Black Sabbath), James Kottak (The Scorpions), Flavor Flav, Vinnie Appice, Paul Shortino, Nick Oshiro (Static-X), and others.	
2nd Annual Vegas Rocks! Magazine Music Awards	August 21, 2011	Las Vegas Hilton, Winchester, Nevada	Guests honored included: Vince Neil (Mötley Crüe), Sebastian Bach (Skid Row), Wayne Static (Static-X), Slim Jim Phantom (The Stray Cats), John 5, Steve Stevens (Billy Idol), Josie Stevens, Matt Sorum, Gilby Clarke & Steven Adler (Guns N' Roses), Carmine Appice, Levi Benton (Miss May I), and others.	
3rd Annual Vegas Rocks! Magazine Music Awards	August 26, 2012	The Joint, Hard Rock Hotel and Casino, Paradise, Nevada	Guests honored included: Sammy Hagar, David Coverdale (Whitesnake), Geoff Tate (Queensrÿche), Mark Kendall (Great White), Michael Schenker (The Scorpions), Blas Elias (Slaughter), Vinnie Paul (Pantera), Kip Winger (Winger), Marq Torien (Bullet Boys), Eddie Trunk (VH1 That Metal Show), Dead Sara, and others. Broadcast internationally to a live audience on AXS TV.	
4th Annual Vegas Rocks! Magazine Music Awards	August 25, 2013	The Joint, Hard Rock Hotel and Casino, Paradise, Nevada	Guests honored included: Carl Palmer (Emerson Lake & Palmer), Jon Anderson (YES), Zakk Wylde (Ozzy), Chris Holmes (W.A.S.P.), DJ Ashba, Tracii Guns & Stacey Blades of LA Guns, Rudy Sarzo (Dio/Quiet Riot), Jordan Rudess (Dream Theater), Danny Koker of The History Channel's Counting Cars, Ron Keel, Ron Jeremy, and others.	
5th Annual Vegas Rocks! Magazine Music Awards	November 23, 2014	Pearl Concert Theater, Palms Casino Resort, Paradise, Nevada	Guests honored included: Nicolas Cage, Wes Cage, Steve Lukather & David Paich (TOTO), Michael Anthony (Van Halen), Stephen Pearcy (RATT), Orianthi (Michael Jackson & Alice Cooper), Rikki Rockett (Poison), Robert Sarzo (Hurricane), and others.	
Vegas Rocks! Magazine Hair Metal Awards	May 15, 2016	Eastside Cannery, Sunrise Manor, Nevada	Guests honored and attending included: Scorpions, Twisted Sister, Quiet Riot, Winger, Doro Pesch, Rudy Sarzo, BulletBoys, Criss Angel, Angel, Brian Tichy, Pretty Boy Floyd. Hosted by Nick Hawk and Sally Steele.	
7th Annual Vegas Rocks! Magazine Music Awards	January 21, 2024	Sam's Town Hotel and Gambling Hall, Las Vegas	Honored guests included: Billy Gibbons from ZZ Top, Rick Nielsen of Cheap Trick, Buck Dharma and Eric Bloom of Blue Öyster Cult, Kip Winger, Orianthi, Rikki Rockett of Poison, Five Finger Death Punch, Count’s 77 featuring Danny Koker (Counting Cars), Blas Elias of Slaughter, Lizzy Borden, Simon Wright of AC/DC, Marco Mendoza, Tim Owens of Judas Priest and many others.	
