= Otto; or, Up with Dead People =

- Directed by: Bruce LaBruce
- Written by: Bruce LaBruce
- Produced by: Bruce LaBruce; Jurgen Brüning; Jörn Hartmann
- Starring: Jey Crisfar; Marcel Schlutt; Nicholas Fox Ricciardi; Keith Boehm; Olivia Barth
- Cinematography: James Carman
- Edited by: Jörn Hartmann
- Release date: November 7, 2008
- Running time: 95 minutes
- Countries: Germany; Canada
- Languages: English; German
- Box office: $11,295

Otto; or, Up with Dead People is a 2008 Canadian and German queer cinema horror film. The film was directed by Bruce LaBruce and stars Jey Crisfar, Marcel Schlutt, Nicholas Fox Ricciardi and Gio Black Peter.

== Plot ==
A young gay man named Otto believes that he is a zombie and has hitched a ride to Berlin and begins to explore the city. Otto is discovered by underground filmmaker Medea Yarn, who begins to make a documentary about him with the support of her girlfriend, Hella Bent, and her brother Adolf. Medea is trying to finish Up with Dead People, the epic political-porno-zombie movie that she has been working on and convinces its star, Fritz Fritze, to allow the vulnerable Otto to stay in his guest bedroom. Otto discovers that he has a wallet that contains information about his past life, remembering details about his ex-boyfriend, Rudolf. He arranges to meet him at the schoolyard where they met. It becomes clear that Otto is human, but dealing with schizophrenia- the soundtrack and visual background repeatedly feature discontinuous sounds and abrupt flashes of light. As Medea prepares to finish her film with a climactic gay zombie orgy, Otto is queerbashed. He makes his way back to Fritz' flat and the two of them make love. Medea finally ends her project with the fictionalised version of Otto burnt to non-existence. However, offscreen, Otto decides to leave Berlin and is last seen hitch-hiking out of the city.

== Cast ==
- Jey Crisfar as Otto
- Marcel Schlutt as Fritz Fritze
- Nicholas Fox Ricciardi as Man in Hooded Sweatshirt
- Keith Boehm as Man in a Suit and Hat
- Olivia Barth as Woman in Black Burga
- Christophe Chemin as Maximilian
- Katharina Klewinghaus as Medea Yarn
- Gio Black Peter as Rudolph
- Bürger P.

== Soundtrack ==
The film's soundtrack (released on CD and as a Limited Double LP on the Crippled Dick Hot Wax label) contains an eclectic selection of pieces by contemporary musicians. Among them: Anohni and the Johnsons, CocoRosie, The Homophones, Othon Mataragas and Ernesto Tomasini.

== Reception ==
On the review aggregator website Rotten Tomatoes, 47% of 19 critics' reviews are positive. The website's consensus reads: "Otto, or Up with Dead People plays to writer-director Bruce LaBruce's provocative strengths, but proves frustratingly less than the sum of its parts." Metacritic, which uses a weighted average, assigned the film a score of 34 out of 100, based on 4 critics, indicating "generally unfavorable" reviews.

== Awards ==
- Merlinka festival International Queer Film Festival, Belgrade Serbia - Best Queer Film

== See also ==
- List of LGBT-related films of 2008
