= Will Wikle =

Big Brother US contestant and pornographic actor

- Born: December 15, 1978 (age 47); Bangor, Maine, U.S.
- Television: Big Brother 5

Charles William Wikle (/ˈwaɪkəl/; born December 15, 1978) is an American actor and reality television personality best known for his appearance in the fifth American season of Big Brother. He was the third openly gay contestant on the reality series, after Bill “Bunky” Miller and Marcellas Reynolds.

Wikle parlayed his Big Brother notoriety into a gig as co-host of the Logo network travel-themed program, Round Trip Ticket. Wikle was a contestant on Bravo's sports/reality series Battle of the Network Reality Stars. In 2008, Wikle was cast as Jasper in the gay spoof sequel, Another Gay Sequel: Gays Gone Wild!, released December 9, 2008.

In 2016, Wikle starred in the gay adult film The Stillest Hour for CockyBoys.

== Credits ==
Year	Title	Role	Notes
2004	Big Brother	Himself - Houseguest	Season 5
2005	Round Trip Ticket	Host	
2005	Battle of the Network Reality Stars	Himself	
2008	Another Gay Sequel: Gays Gone Wild!	Jasper	
2016	The Stillest Hour	Psychotherapist	
