= Deb and Sisi =

- Directed by: Mark Kenneth Woods
- Written by: Mark Kenneth Woods
- Produced by: Mark Kenneth Woods; Michael Venus
- Starring: Mark Kenneth Woods; Michael Venus; Carl MacDonald; Ryan Steele
- Distributed by: MKW Productions
- Release date: August 16, 2008
- Running time: 81 minutes
- Country: Canada
- Language: English

Deb and Sisi is a blue comedy/dark comedy feature film, written, produced and directed by Mark Kenneth Woods, which had its debut at the Out On Screen Vancouver Queer Film Festival in August, 2008. The DVD was released May 25, 2010 through MKW Productions and the film aired on television for the first time on October 30, 2011, on OUTtv in Canada.

== Synopsis ==
Deb and Sisi follows homely Deborah Dyer (Mark Kenneth Woods) who tries everything she can to "suicide herself" when she finds herself still single on her 40th birthday. But all attempts fail as fate sends her car swerving right into Sisi Sickles (Michael Venus), a recently evicted promiscuous alcoholic. Seeing an opportunity for a quick buck, Sisi is soon at Deb's doorstep with a "broken umbilical cord or two". Stricken with guilt, a naïve Deb postpones her self-destructive plans to take care of Sisi, but quickly discovers that killing herself might be an easier option after all.

== Cast ==
- Mark Kenneth Woods as Deborah Dyer
- Michael Venus as Sisi Sickles
- Carl MacDonald as Prudence Proudfoot
- Ryan Steele as Dream Man
- Mel Siermaczescki as Frank Fairbanks
- Dickey Doo as Juan Hernandez
- Jason Bradstock as Waiter
- Tim Old as Barbara
- David French as Gary
- Kevin Mulhern as Cody

== Critical reception ==
Yvonne Zacharais of the Vancouver Sun called the film "A delightful and hilarious film that would probably appeal to straight folks as much as queers."
