= Happy Birthday (2002 film) =

- Directed by: Yen Tan
- Written by: Yen Tan
- Produced by: Mark Buchanan
- Cinematography: Jack Burroughs
- Edited by: Jay Wesson
- Music by: Steve Whitehouse
- Release date: 2002
- Running time: 94 minutes
- Country: United States
- Languages: English (main), Urdu, Taiwanese, Spanish

Happy Birthday is a 2003 American film directed by Yen Tan and starring Benjamin Patrick, Michelle E. Michael and John Frazier. It is Tan's debut long feature film.

== Synopsis ==
The film recounts two days in the lives of five very different characters all born on June 12, that are faced with problems as their birthday approaches: Jim (Benjamin Patrick), a gay, overweight telemarketer working for a weight loss program is facing self-esteem problems; Ron (John Frazier), a church minister, preaches about conversion but himself is addicted to watching gay porn; Javed (Devashish Saxena), a Pakistani who lives in the U.S. with a gay porn actor, is faced by the double dilemma of being condemned by his Muslim family and is in imminent danger of being deported from the States; Kelly (Michelle E. Michael), a lesbian executive, weathers a breakup with her lover and considers an earlier affair; and Tracy (Ethel Lung), a young Asian lesbian, goes back in the closet when her mother renders a visit.

== Cast ==
- Benjamin Patrick as Jim
- Michelle E. Michael as Kelly
- John Frazier as Ron
- Devashish Saxena as Javed
- Ethel Lung as Tracy
- Denton Blane Everett as Greg
- Xiao Fei Zhao as Mom
- Lynn Chambers as Julie
- Derik Webb as Troy
- Chip Gilliam as Brian
- Natalie Thrash as Tricia
- Debbie Rey as Sophia
- Ryan Harper as Ricky
- James M. Johnston as Porn director
- David Lowery as Videographer

== Awards ==
- In 2002, won the Jury Prize for "Best Feature - Gay Male" at the Philadelphia International Gay & Lesbian Film Festival
- In 2002, director Yen Tan won New Directors Showcase - Best Feature award for Happy Birthday at the Portland LGBT Film Festival
- Also earned an honorable mention at Image+Nation in Montreal
