= It's Complicated (film) =

2009 film by Nancy Meyers

- Theatrical release poster
- Directed by: Nancy Meyers
- Written by: Nancy Meyers
- Produced by: Nancy Meyers; Scott Rudin
- Starring: Meryl Streep; Steve Martin; Alec Baldwin; John Krasinski
- Cinematography: John Toll
- Edited by: Joe Hutshing; David Moritz
- Music by: Hans Zimmer; Heitor Pereira
- Production companies: Relativity Media; Waverly Films; Scott Rudin Productions
- Distributed by: Universal Pictures
- Release date: December 25, 2009
- Running time: 120 minutes
- Country: United States
- Language: English
- Budget: $75–85 million
- Box office: $219.1 million

It's Complicated is a 2009 American romantic comedy film written and directed by Nancy Meyers. It stars Meryl Streep as a bakery owner and single mother of three who starts a secret affair with her ex-husband, played by Alec Baldwin, ten years after their divorce – only to find herself drawn to another man: her architect, Adam (portrayed by Steve Martin). The film also features John Krasinski in a supporting role.

It's Complicated received mixed reviews from critics upon release, with praise for the performances of the ensemble cast, with mild criticism for its "somewhat predictable" story. It was released in the United States and Canada by Universal Pictures on December 25, 2009, it played well through the holidays and into January 2010, closing on April 1 with $112.7 million. Worldwide, It's Complicated eventually grossed $219.1 million, surpassing The Holiday (2006) to become Meyer's third-highest-grossing project to date.

It's Complicated received three nominations at the 67th Golden Globe Awards – Best Motion Picture – Musical or Comedy, Best Screenplay (both for Meyers) and Best Actress – Motion Picture Comedy or Musical (Streep). At the 63rd British Academy Film Awards, Baldwin received a nomination for Best Actor in a Supporting Role, while the film's ensemble cast won the National Board of Review Award for Best Cast at the 2009 ceremony.

== Plot ==
Jane, who owns a successful bakery in Santa Barbara, California, and Jake Adler, a successful attorney, have been divorced for 10 years. They had three children together, two girls and a boy, the youngest of whom has just left for college, leaving Jane feeling lonely. Jake has since married Agness, the much younger woman with whom he cheated on Jane.

With Agness remaining home due to her son Pedro being ill, Jane and Jake attend their son Luke's college graduation in New York City. The two have drinks and have a pleasant evening reminiscing together, which leads to them ending up in bed together. Jane instantly regrets what they have done, while Jake is thrilled and continues to pursue her when they return to Santa Barbara. They soon begin an affair.

While Agness has Jake scheduled for regular sessions at a fertility clinic, Jake is secretly taking medication to decrease his frequent urination, the side effects of which are decreased sperm count and dizziness. After one of his sessions, he has a lunchtime rendezvous with Jane at a hotel.

Jake collapses in the hotel room and a doctor is called. The doctor speculates that the reason for Jake's distress may be the medication and says he should stop taking it. Jake and Jane's children know nothing of the affair, but Harley, who is engaged to their daughter Lauren, spots the pair and the doctor in the hotel. He then endures considerable stress while keeping their secret.

Jane spends an evening cooking an elaborate meal at Jake's request, but he is a no-show due to Agnes changing her plans. So, Jane ends the affair. She begins seeing Adam, the architect hired to remodel her home who is still healing from a divorce of his own.

On the night of Luke's graduation party in Santa Barbara, Jane invites Adam as her date. She is stoned when he picks her up because she has taken a hit from a marijuana joint that Jake had given her earlier. Before going into the party, Adam smokes some of the joint with Jane. Once inside, they are laughing and happily high, Jake becomes jealous observing them, and after pressing Jane, smokes some with her also. Agness then observes Jake and Jane dancing together and senses they are having an affair.

After the party, Adam and Jane go to Jane's bakery, where they make chocolate croissants together and end the evening with a romantic kiss. Jake and Agness separate, although it is not clear who has left whom, and the kids, sympathetic to Jake's apparent heartbreak, ask him to stay with them at Jane's, where they enjoy a pleasant evening together as a family.

Jake goes into Jane's bedroom and disrobes in an attempt to seduce her, unaware that she has been speaking with Adam via webcam. He sees Jake and Jane is forced to admit to him and her children that while she and Jake did have an affair, it is over and she is not interested in getting back together with him.

Adam later tells Jane he cannot continue seeing her because he fears it will only lead to heartbreak. She later reconciles with her children, who admit they were troubled by what has happened between their parents because they are still recovering from the divorce. So, Jane amicably ends her affair with Jake for good.

On a rainy day, the construction crew arrives at Jane's house to commence the remodeling. Adam unexpectedly appears, telling her that breaking ground in the rain is good luck. The two share a laugh as he asks her if she would be willing to make chocolate croissants again.

== Cast ==
- Meryl Streep as Jane Adler, a successful bakery owner
- Steve Martin as Adam Schaffer, Jane's architect
- Alec Baldwin as Jacob "Jake" Adler, Jane's ex-husband
- Lake Bell as Agness Adler, Jake's wife
- Hunter Parrish as Luke David Adler, Jane and Jake's son
- Zoe Kazan as Gabby Adler, Jane and Jake's younger daughter
- Caitlin FitzGerald as Lauren Adler, Jane and Jake's older daughter
- John Krasinski as Harley, Lauren's fiancé
- Mary Kay Place as Joanne
- Rita Wilson as Trisha
- Alexandra Wentworth as Diane
- James Patrick Stuart as Dr. Moss, the plastic surgeon
- Blanchard Ryan as Annalise
- Michael Rivera as Eddie
- Robert Curtis Brown as Peter
- Peter Mackenzie as Dr. Alan, Jane's therapist
- Rosalie Ward as Alex
- Jimmy Clabots as Chase
- Emjay Anthony as Pedro Adler
- Emily Kinney as waitress
- Nora Dunn as Sally
- Bruce Altman as Ted
- Lisa Lynn Masters as woman in elevator
- Pat Finn as hotel doctor
- Valente Rodriguez as Reynaldo
- Andrew Stewart-Jones as restaurant host
- Geneva Carr as woman at fertility clinic
- Deidre Goodwin as fertility nurse
- Jessica St. Clair as wedding specialist
- Marina Squerciati as Melanie
- Robert Adamson as college kid at party
- Heitor Pereira as party musician
- Ramin Djawadi as party musician
- Alan Cumming as TV actor (uncredited)
- Anne Lockhart as party guest (uncredited)
- Oprah Winfrey as herself (uncredited)

== Production ==
=== Casting ===
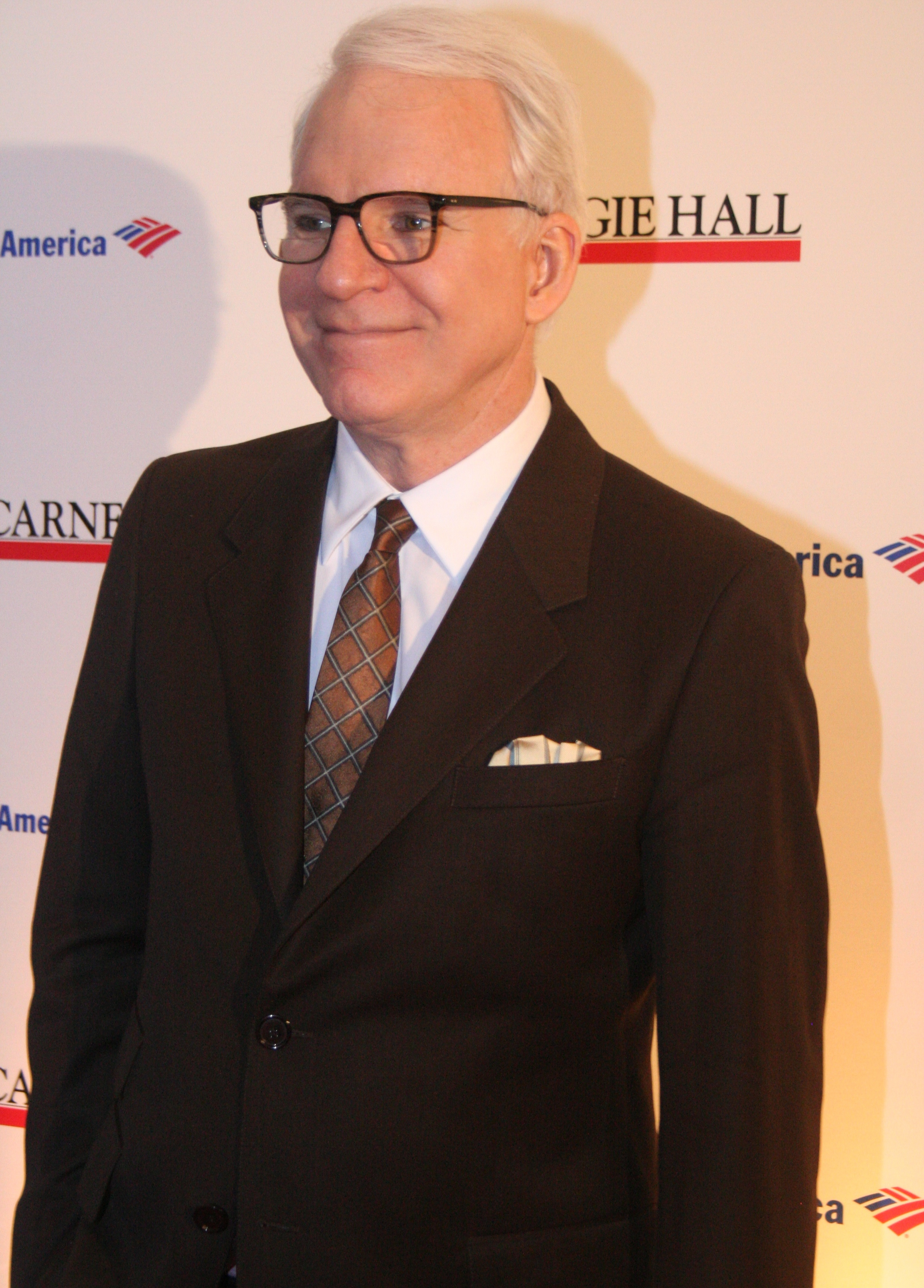
It's Complicated marked Steve Martin's third collaboration with director Nancy Meyers.

In May 2008, Nancy Meyers agreed to a project for Universal Studios that she would write and direct, to be co-produced with Scott Rudin. The project was referred to as The Untitled Nancy Meyers Project during its inception and early production. Establishing commitments from the principals began in 2008, with Meryl Streep and Alec Baldwin entering discussions in August, and Steve Martin joining the cast in October. Casting continued through 2009, with Zoe Kazan, Lake Bell, and Hunter Parrish joining in January, John Krasinski in February, Rita Wilson in March, and Caitlin Fitzgerald in June.

=== Filming ===
While the majority of the film is set in Santa Barbara, California, most of the filming – including nearly all of the interiors – took place in New York City. Principal photography began on February 18, 2009, at the Broadway Stages in the Brooklyn borough, where the interior scenes of Jane's house were shot. Several other key locations were used during the first portion of filming in New York, including Picnic House, a large, studio-sized structure in Brooklyn's Prospect Park, where Jane's bakery was built inside; the facilities at Sarabeth's Bakery in the Chelsea Market; and a commercial loft building in New York's Chelsea district, where scenes at Adam's office were filmed in. As Martin was soon to embark on a concert tour to promote The Crow: New Songs for the Five-String Banjo (2009), his schedule required the team to complete shooting his scenes during the first two months of filming.

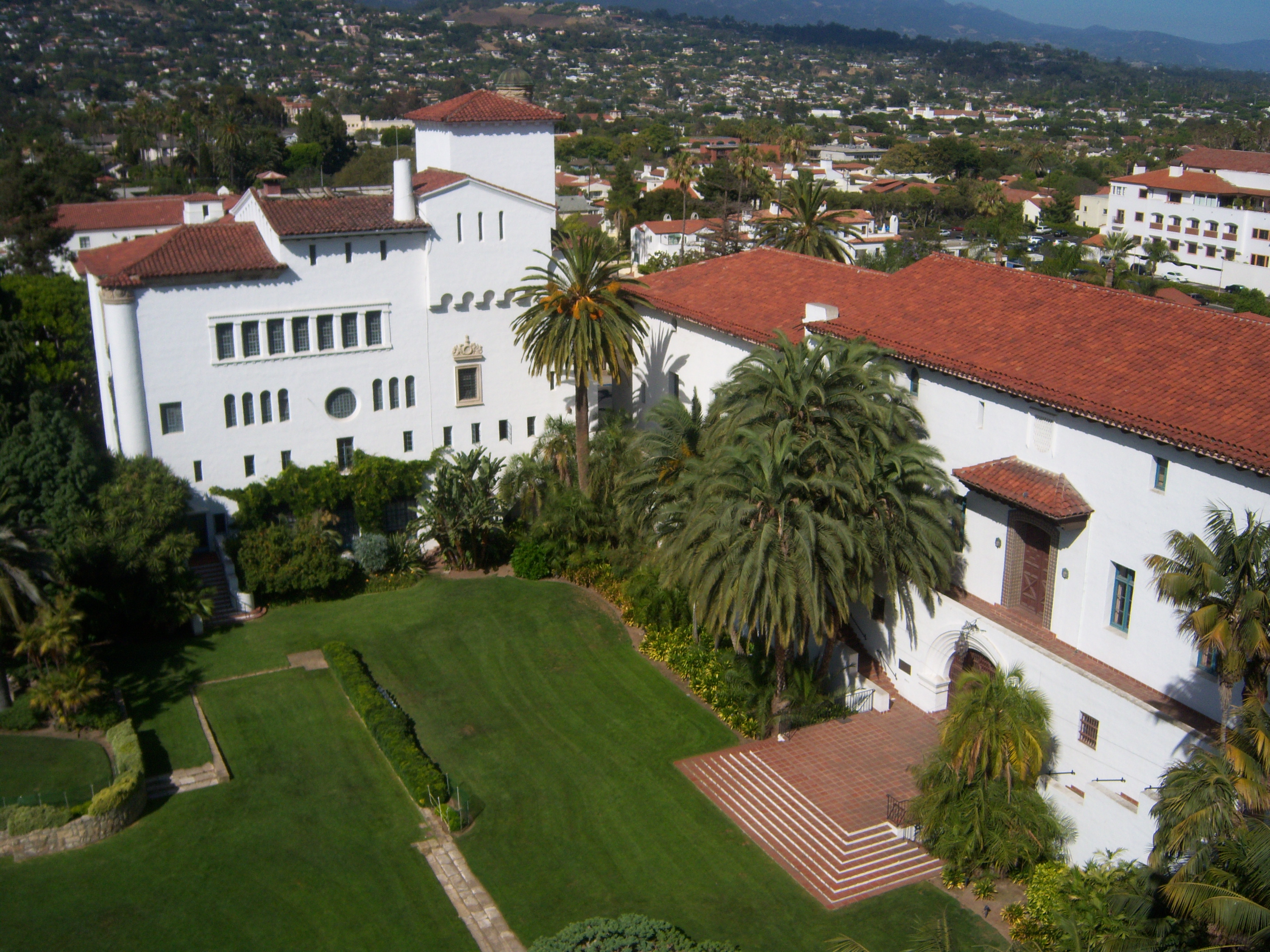
Though set in Santa Barbara, the film was primarily shot in New York City.

In April 2009, the company relocated to Los Angeles, where cast and crew started filming scenes taking place outside Jane's house, for which a ranch house located in Thousand Oaks in the north of Los Angeles was used. In mid-April, the crew spent a few days filming exteriors in Montecito and Santa Barbara – just days before wildfires took a heavy toll on the area. Additional scenes were taken in front of numerous downtown landmarks, including the Santa Barbara County Courthouse and the El Paseo section. Afterwards, the team returned to Los Angeles for completion of the scenes at Jane's house and for the filming at the Bel-Air Bay Club in the Pacific Palisades neighborhood. In early May, principal photography returned to Brooklyn for completion. For Luke's graduation scenes, shooting took place at St. John's University in Queens and on Park Avenue in Manhattan. Several different locations stood in for the fictional Park Regent hotel: While a residence building on Park Avenue and 59th Street was used for exterior shots, the lobby and Jane's hotel room were in the JW Marriott Essex House. The hotel bar was the interior of a restaurant on Tenth Avenue. Filming eventually completed in August 2009.

The sets were easy to design. Most scenes take place in the protagonist's home and interior courtyard, and as such the details had to be fastidiously worked out, but the rooms were kept bare to reflect the character's functional tastes and limited budget. There are relatively few decorations, just "a bunch of thrift-store things haphazardly thrown together", in the words of production designer Jon Hutman. The building itself is a traditional 1920s Spanish-ranch-style adobe-mud house which "epitomised the Santa Barbara area."

== Reception ==
=== Critical response ===
On Rotten Tomatoes, the film has an approval rating of 58% based on 183 reviews, with an average rating of 5.80/10. The website's critical consensus is: "Despite fine work by an appealing cast, It's Complicated is predictable romantic comedy fare, going for broad laughs instead of subtlety and nuance." Another review aggregator, Metacritic, which assigns a weighted average, gave the film a score of 57 out of 100, based on 30 critics, indicating "mixed or average" reviews. Audiences surveyed by CinemaScore gave the film an average grade "A–" on an A+ to F scale

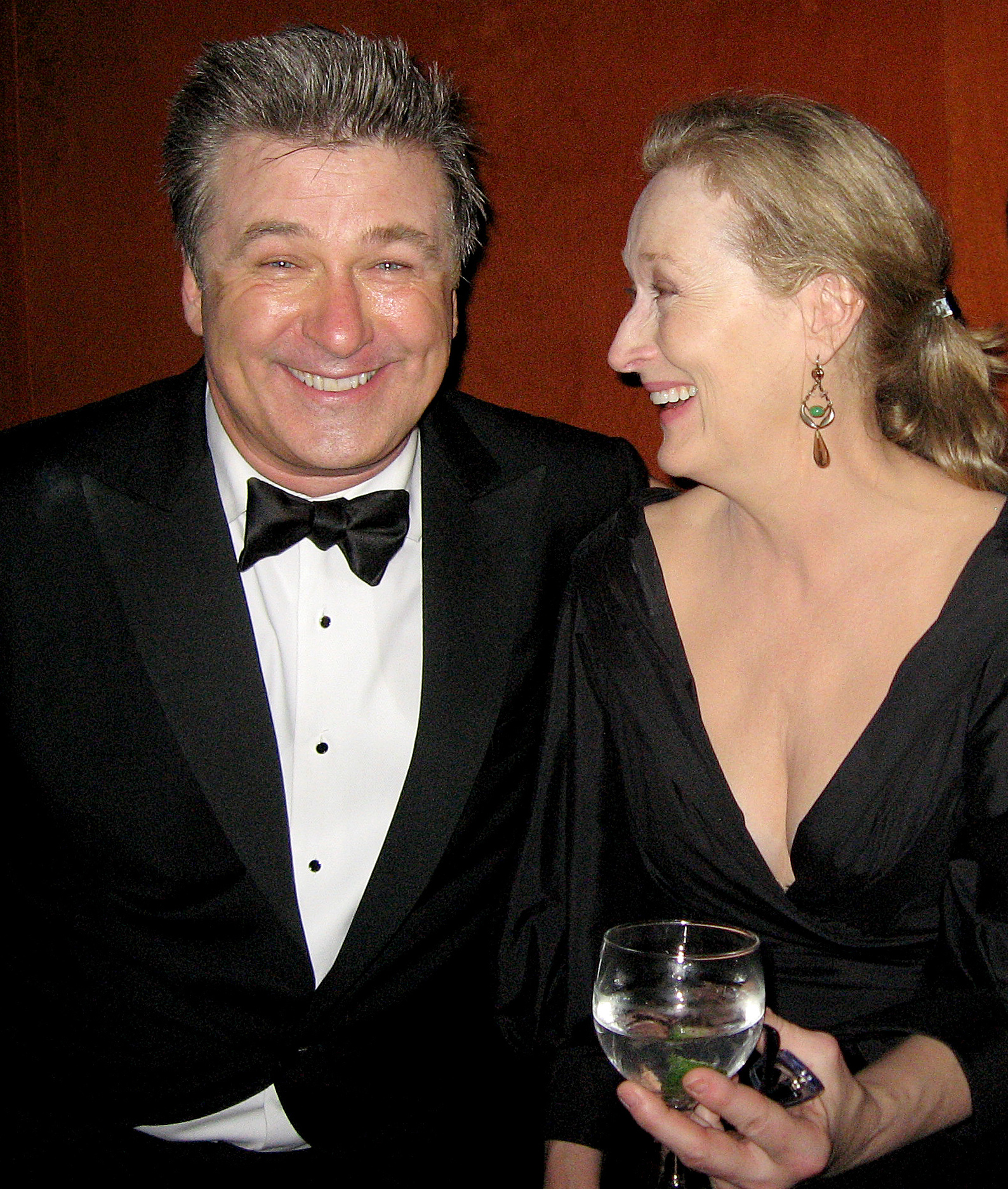
Baldwin and Streep received positive reviews from critics for their performances in It's Complicated.

Wesley Morris of the Boston Globe called the film "the most emotionally sophisticated of all Meyers's fantasies" and praised the acting performances in it. He noted that the film felt like "a made-for-Meryl film [in which] Streep deploys all her best moves [...] in movie star mode, and she's irresistible," and declared Baldwin a worthy match to her, writing: "It's Complicated unleashes an unabashedly, desperately romantic side of Baldwin that we haven't seen before. He doesn't steal this movie so much as grant all Streep's fluttering and twirling and hand-fanning an exuberant counterweight." In his review for the Washington Post, Michael O'Sullivan called the film a "very grown-up – and very funny – love story [which] manages to be both light on its feet and heavy enough to deliver something of a message." He concluded: "Food Network porn, hot, middle-age sex and a happy, if slightly bittersweet, ending. For a particular audience – but not just for that audience – what's not to love?" Peter Travers of Rolling Stone called the film an "unapologetic chick flick" and wrote that "you don't have to feel guilty for lapping up this froth. Just don't expect nourishment." He rated the film two and a half stars out of four.

Roger Ebert of the Chicago Sun-Times also gave it two and a half stars and called the film a prime example of Meyers' established "cottage industry of movies about romantically-inclined middle-aged people." He found praise for the cast of both Streep and Baldwin, the former of whom he felt "inspires as so often our belief that she's good at everything she does," but noted that while the film contained "funny stuff" and likeable characters, It's Complicated was more of "a rearrangement of the goods in Nancy Meyers' bakery, and some of them belong on the day-old shelf." Writing for Time magazine, Mary Pols complimented Streep's "radiant, funny and endearingly vulnerable" performance and Meyers' "clever and fresh [...] intent in showing the reality of the fantasy coming true." However, she felt that It's Complicated "is positioned more as a which-guy-will-she-choose story" which misses "dramatic tension to feed that plot line."

Lisa Schwarzbaum of Entertainment Weekly gave the film a B− rating and declared the film a "middle-aged porn, the specialty of Meyers, who also set ladies and interior decorators drooling over homes and gardens in 2006's The Holiday." Salon.com writer Stephanie Zacharek dismissed the film as "another missive from romantic-comedy hell," and felt that "Alec Baldwin -- in his undershorts, no less -- saves Nancy Meyers' latest midlife whingefest."

=== Box office ===
Released on December 25, 2009, in the United States, It's Complicated opened in 2,887 locations and placed fourth on the US box office after its first weekend. It charted behind Avatar, Sherlock Holmes, and Alvin and the Chipmunks: The Squeakquel with $22.1 million, scoring a $7,655 average income per theatre. It played well through the holidays and into January 2010, ultimately closing on April 1 with $112.7 million in North America and a total of $219.1 million worldwide.

=== Accolades ===
List of Awards and Nominations
Award	Category	Recipients	Result
15th Critics' Choice Awards	Best Comedy Film	It's Complicated	Nominated
67th Golden Globe Awards	Best Motion Picture – Musical or Comedy	It's Complicated	Nominated
67th Golden Globe Awards	Best Actress – Motion Picture Comedy or Musical	Meryl Streep	Nominated
67th Golden Globe Awards	Best Screenplay	Nancy Meyers	Nominated
2009 National Board of Review Awards	Best Ensemble Cast	It's Complicated	Won
14th Satellite Awards	Best Film – Musical or Comedy	It's Complicated	Nominated
63rd British Academy Film Awards	Best Supporting Actor	Alec Baldwin	Nominated

== Home media ==
It's Complicated became available on DVD and Blu-ray Tuesday, April 27, 2010.
