= House of Venus Show =

Television show filmed in Vancouver

- Third season DVD cover
- Created by: MKW Productions
- Starring: Mark Kenneth Woods; Michael Venus; Miss Cotton; Dickey Doo
- Country of origin: Canada
- No. of episodes: 18

Production
- Running time: 22 minutes

Original release
- Network: OutTV
- Release: July 2005 – 2009

The House of Venus Show is a Canadian LGBT sketch comedy television show created by Canadian filmmaker Mark Kenneth Woods and co-produced by Michael Venus. The first season aired on the Canadian LGBT channel OutTV in July 2005. The second season began airing in September, 2006 and, after a hiatus, a third season debuted in July, 2009.

The show also aired on SelecTV in Australia in 2006. Pink TV in France, Belgium, Switzerland and other territories started airing the first 2 seasons of the show with the alternate title "Le Venus Show" in September, 2006. The show began airing in the Netherlands, Belgium, and Sweden in April, 2008 on OutTV's European counterpart. here! network in the USA began airing the show in August, 2008.

Filmed in Vancouver, British Columbia, Canada, the sketch comedy show blends politics and pop culture with humour and irreverence. The series stars Mark Kenneth Woods, Miss Cotton, Michael Venus, Dickey Doo and includes guest stars The B-52's, Peaches, John Cameron Mitchell, Candis Cayne, Lady Bunny, Amanda Lepore, Lady Miss Kier and others.

Alluvial Filmworks, a division of Village Lighthouse, released "The Complete First Season" on DVD worldwide on November 6, 2007 and "The Complete Second Season" on April 22, 2008. "The Complete Third Season" was released through MKW Productions on May 25, 2010.

== Origins ==
After years of success on the LGBT film festival circuit with his short films, Mark Kenneth Woods decided to expand on some of the characters he had created in these shorts and package it as a sketch comedy/variety show. With the help of co-producer Michael Venus, the duo created a unique show relevant to an LGBT audience made up of a series of short films, live action comedic sketches, live performances and interviews with international talent.

== Cast ==
The show has 4 original cast members that play a variety of popular characters and a number of guest appearances.

- Mark Kenneth Woods (Season 1-3)
- Michael Venus (Season 1-3)
- Miss Cotton (Season 1-3)
- Dickey Doo (Season 1-2)

== Guests ==
To date, the show has had a number of internationally renowned guests appear in interviews and short live action segments. Highlights include:

- The B-52's (episode #17)
- Candis Cayne (Episode #9 & #16)
- Peaches (Episode #13)
- Amanda Lepore (Episode #4 & #15)
- John Cameron Mitchell (Episode #14)
- Lady Bunny (Episode #6)
- Lady Miss Kier (Episodes #3 & #12)
- Miss Honey Dijon (Episode #10)
- Carole Pope (Episode #2)
- Johnny Hazzard (Episode #17)
- Heloise and the Savoir Faire (Episode #16)
- Larry Tee (Episode #15)

== Episodes ==
=== Season 1 ===
Episode #1
Jonny Pimp & Honey Ho face off against "Big Daddy" in their first Adventure, the national news goes wacko and musical guest Stink Mitt drop by for some "camel toe." Includes: "Kitchen Scratchy", "6pm in America", "Pimp & Ho: Adventures in Queersploitation" and "Camel Toe" by Stink Mitt

Episode #2
Deb and Sisi shop until they drop on the campiest of home shopping networks, The wackiest show on earth celebrates 10 years in the art of "head," Father McFairy and Tammy Hymn beg for your help and Carole Pope (Rough Trade) drops by for a chat. Includes: "Cotton's Sex Ad", "Carole Pope Interview", "Praise the Marys", "Backroom" by Dixmix feat. Kaytea, "Shop Until We All Drop" and "Wiggle 10"

Episode #3
Jonny Pimp & Honey Ho are back when Dr. Normal tries to rid the world of queers in a James Bond-esque installment and Lady Miss Kier (Deee-Lite) talks candidly about her post-Deee-Lite career. Includes: "No Flow", "Pimp & Ho: License to Queer", "Lady Miss Kier Interview"

Episode #4
Little Billy wonders why he can't marry George W., Pepe and Vance become Designer Gays, someone let Deb and Sisi back on TV and special guest Amanda Lepore performs "Champagne" with Cazwell. Includes: "Designer Gays", "Holy Matrimony Billy!", "Amanda Lepore with Cazwell Performance" and "Get it Together Girl"

Episode #5
Jonny Pimp & Honey Ho fight the religious right in a gangster inspired installment, Wiggle returns for the craziest in headgear and Miss Guy (Toilet Boys) drops by to chat. Includes: "Public Gender Announcement", "Pimp & Ho: Queer Fashion Crime Models", "Wiggle 11" and "Miss Guy Interview"

Episode #6
Jonny Pimp & Honey Ho fear for their lives in an ode to horror flicks, the amazing Lady Bunny is in the house to perform and Krueger is on the loose. Includes: "Bunny's Crisis Line", "Bunny's Laugh In #1", "Nightmare on Venus Street", "Pimp & Ho: Terror in Pansy Hills", "Bunny's Laugh In #2" and "Lady Bunny Interview"

=== Season 2 ===
Episode #7
Deb and Sisi return to television a little late for the holidays; the heterosexual lifestyle is scrutinized in a Right-Wing Religious Parody and NYC’s 2004 entertainer of the year Edie drops by. Includes: "CBD: Compulsive Beauty Disorder", "Public Gender Announcement #1", "Holiday Hamper", "Cotton Outro #1", "The Heterosexual Agenda 2005" and "Edie Interview"

Episode #8
Jonny Pimp & Honey Ho face off against ex-gays comic book-style; we get a look at the real House of Venus in a Behind the Music spoof and Berlin/NYC diva Sherry Vine plays with us. Includes: "Behind The Camera", "Sherry Vine Interview", "Cotton Outro #2", "Pimp & Ho: Sissy Sins", "Public Gender Announcement #2" and "Hi Boys" by Cotton feat. Big Stuff

Episode #9
Deb and Sisi get inadvertently racist on their home shopping network, the 6 O'Clock new is scrutinized, we talk to New York's DJ Marco and the gorgeous Candis Cayne performs. Includes: "Guyphone Commercial", "DJ Marco Interview", "Shop Until We All Drop 2", "Candis Cayne Interview", "Fawks News" and "My Heart Belongs To Data"

Episode #10
The Designer Gays do their best to make over a corporate executive, the new girl in school has a hard time making friends in "Linette", the art of head is back in "Wiggle 12" and we have a chat with Miss Honey Dijon. Includes: "Linette", "Designer Gays: Makeover" "Miss Honey Dijon Interview" and "Wiggle 12"

Episode #11
Those shopping network girls Deb and Sisi try selling the "Kitchen Magician" on late night TV, the kookiest kids show is revealed with a little help from Denis Simpson and we talk to Montreal's sexiest performer Frigid. Includes "Fawshaw Community College", "Art Class", "Pipsy Curtain", "Deb & Sisi's Kitchen Magician" and "Frigid Interview"

Episode #12
The Designer Gays try to decorate a nightclub based on Castle Grayskull, the religious right tries to "save the family" and we're in San Francisco for Gay Pride where we talk to Lady Miss Kier, Juanita More and Heklina. Includes: "Hi Greg/Hi Beth/Hi Liz", "Save The Family", "Designer Gays: Home Edition", "Rainbow Ministries", "Lady Miss Kier, Juanita More & Heklina Interviews"

=== Season 3 ===
Episode #13
The Designer Gays take entertaining for Pride to a whole new level, Fawks News correspondent Gracie Nance comes down hard on Canada for allowing gay marriage and we talk to electro goddess Peaches and LA's Jackie Beat. Includes: "Mansounds", "Designer Gays: Pride Edition", "Peaches Interview", "Fawks News 2", "Jackie Beat Interview" and "Venus Girl"

Episode #14
Deb and Sisi talk about swallowing meat cooked in their "Fat-Reductionating [sic] Grilling Machine", lonely Linette gets a phone call from crazy Liz, and Hedwig and Shortbus director John Cameron Mitchell and electroclash king Larry Tee join us for a chat. Includes: "Liz and Nephew", "John Cameron Mitchell Interview", "Liz and Telemarketer", "Deb and Sisi's Fat-Reductionating Grilling Machine", "Liz and Linette", "Up North Buds 1" and "Larry Tee Interview"

Episode #15
Jonny Pimp & Honey Ho are summoned by the "Gaysian Division" of The Queer Secret Service in Hong Kong in a Kung Fu inspired installment, the "Up North Buds" talk about rather gay-ish "dude" stuff and we talk to the always amazing Amanda Lepore and Cazwell. Includes: "Durty Cuntry", "Up North Buds 2", "Cazwell Interview", "Pimp & Ho: The Dragon Fairy" and "Amanda Lepore Interview"

Episode #16
The Designer Gays break into a straight guys house in order to "rescue" him from blandness, Liz gets a phone call from Cher, Cotton has a spooky run in with Pinhead, we talk to the gorgeous Candis Cayne and Brooklyn's Heloise and the Savoir Faire perform. Includes: "Liz and Cher", "Designer Gays: The Rescue", "Liz and a Stranger", "Heloise and the Savoir Faire Interview", "Odyle", "Liz and a Pervert", "Candis Cayne Interview" and "Cotton vs. Pinhead"

Episode #17
Deb and Sisi make a home video to teach you about style and fashion, little Billy learns all about a new gay disease that could ruin his life, we speak with the legendary B-52's and pornstar/actor Johnny Hazzard. Includes: "Cotton's 20 Load Weekend", "Johnny Hazzard Interview", "Deb And Sisi's Welcome To My House At My Home", "You Got GRIDS Billy!" and "The B-52's Interview"

Episode #18
An hour-long "Best of" featuring favourite clips alongside interviews with the creators and cast, outtakes and never before seen footage. Includes an interview with Bruce LaBruce.

== DVD release ==
"The Complete First Season" DVD was released via Alluvial Filmworks on November 6, 2007. "The Complete Second Season" DVD was released April 22, 2008. "The Complete Third Season" was released on May 25, 2010. The DVD sets are available online via 10percent.com, amazon.com, TLA Video and a variety of retailers.
