= Nick Hawk =

American actor and reality television

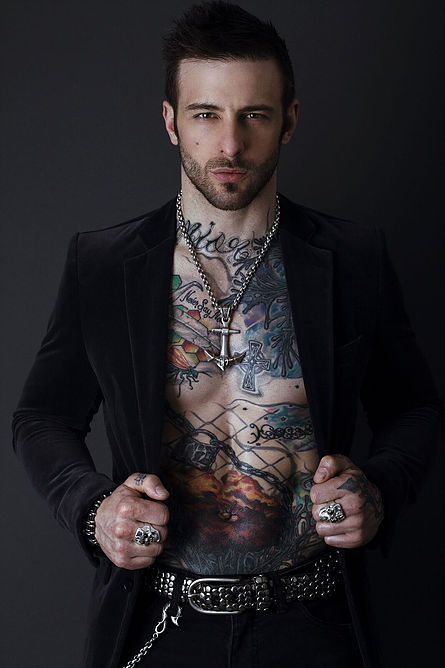
- Born: Nicholas Haas; September 3, 1981 (age 44); Madison, Wisconsin
- Occupation(s): Actor, reality television star, musician, rapper, songwriter, author and entrepreneur

Nick Hawk
Medal record

Representing United States

Brazilian Jiu-Jitsu/Submission Grappling

World No-Gi Jiu-Jitsu Championship
Silver medal – second place	2017	Heavy (Black)
Gold medal – first place	2014	Light-Heavy (Purple)

American National Gi Jiu-Jitsu Championship
Gold medal – first place	2018	Super-Heavy (Black)
Silver medal – second place	2016	Light-Heavy (Brown)
Gold medal – first place	2016	Absolute (Brown)

American National No-Gi Jiu-Jitsu Championship
Gold medal – first place	2018	Super-Heavy (Black)

Pan American Jiu-Jitsu Championship
Gold medal – first place	2017	Medium-Heavy (Brown)

Asian Open Championship (Brazilian jiu-jitsu)
Gold medal – first place	2018	Light-Heavy (black)
Silver medal – second place	2018	Absolute (black)

Tokyo Open Championship
Silver medal – second place	2018	Light-Heavy (Black)

Houston Open Championship
Gold medal – first place	2018	Light-Heavy (Black)

Dallas Open No-Gi Championship
Gold medal – first place	2017	Light-Heavy (Black)

Nick Hawk (born Nicholas Haas; September 3, 1981) is an American actor and reality television star best known as one of the stars of Gigolos; a reality TV show featured on Showtime which focuses on the lives of five male escorts in Las Vegas, Nevada. Nick has worked on various other projects including several rap albums and music videos. He has authored multiple books and written or been featured in several different magazines. Hawk is also an accomplished martial artist with a black belt in Brazilian Jiu Jitsu.

== Personal life ==
Born and raised in Wisconsin, Nick Hawk grew up working on farms, racing dirt bikes, snowboarding, camping, wrestling, and playing football. During high school, he was very active in athletics, earned four varsity letters and was also the wrestling captain his senior year. He wrestled in college for a year at University of Wisconsin–Stevens Point in 2001. The next year, he joined the Air Force for a four-year tour to earn additional money for college. During his military service, he was stationed in Texas and Kansas and obtained the rank of Air Force senior airman and crew chief. After the military, he went on to graduate with a double major in English and Journalism in 2007.

== Career ==
In 2006, Hawk started his company Explicit Strippers, which he operated through 2014. The Los Angeles-based stripper booking agency for private parties has since expanded and opened franchises in Orange County, Las Vegas, San Diego and Hawaii. Hawk also created his own "Nick Hawk Gigolo"-branded product line of sex toys, featuring a molded dildo, the "Nick Hawk Gigolo at Your Service" sex doll, a penis pump, a whip, handcuffs, and other sexual arousal devices.

=== Reality television ===
In 2011, Hawk first starred in the American reality television series Gigolos. The show focuses on the lives of five male escorts living in Las Vegas. Each episode follows the men, all employees of the same escort agency Cowboys4Angels, through their daily lives, and focuses on their daily interactions with clients and each other. Cameras follow the escorts on their appointments with women and include an uncensored look at intimate situations and their sexual activities. The series debuted on the premium cable channel Showtime on April 7, 2011.

=== Writing ===
In 2014, Hawk wrote a semi-autobiographical novel, Sexoirs of a Gigolo: Complete Collection, which was released by Vigliano Books on July 4, 2014. The book presents the "real life sexual experiences" of the men of Showtime's Gigolos series. Other books written by Hawk include Nick Hawk Gigolo Sexual Positions, which is advertised as a "comprehensive sex guide with over 60 sexual positions demonstrated". In 2017, Hawk released an autobiographical self-help book entitled Nick Hawk's 100 Kicks in the Ass: A Guide To Reach Your Full Potential & Gain Confidence. Nick uses stories from his past to outlines strategies for overcoming personal issues such as: sex and dating, social anxiety, lack of confidence, depression, kicking prescription pills, alcohol abuse and being overweight.

In 2017, Penthouse Magazine started a new section entitled "Model Citizen," and asked Nick to be the writer for it. He also has published material in "Strip LV Magazine" and has given advice to Men's Health, Cosmopolitian and AskMen Magazine.

=== Music ===
Hawk made his musical debut in 2012 with his first single and first music video for the track "Gigolow" from his album Nick Hawk Vol. 1. In early 2016, he released a music video for the rap metal song "We Fight" and "We Like to Show Off". At least fifteen Nick Hawk singles have been released, including "No Competition", "Leave With Me", "Tippin 'N Sippin", "Everybody's Got A Little Country In 'Em" and his latest song, a cover of the Miley Cyrus song "Wrecking Ball".

In 2016, Nick's music was featured on Eminem's Shade 45 "The All Out Show" and 50 Cent's "This Is 50" show.

On January 21, 2016, Hawk performed a set of his metal rap songs in Las Vegas at the Palms Casino Resort January 21 at the 33rd AVN Awards and also presented two awards: "All Girl Performer of the Year" and "Best Parody" with Skin Diamond and Jacky St. James.

Hawk was chosen as one of Music Connection magazine's Top 100 Unsigned Artists for 2016.

Hawk's music video for his track "Born to Be Bad" is featured in the 2017 movie American Justice and plays at the end of the film during the credits.

=== Martial arts ===
While stationed in the Air Force, Hawk evolved his martial arts skills from a focus on wrestling to Brazilian Jiu-jitsu. He has trained under Shawn Williams and Robert Drysdale, who gave Nick his black belt on the podium after winning the 2017 Pan-American Championship.

=== Other ventures ===
In 2008, Nick Hawk was featured on the cover of Men's Health UK and in July 2015, Inked Magazine did a feature and photo spread highlighting his body art. Nick was featured on the cover of the Summer 2013 edition of Playgirl magazine.

In 2014 Nick Hawk was a guest on Watch What Happens Live with Andy Cohen alongside Nick Kroll.

Hawk, with co-star Jerod Zavistoski, had a radio show, "Modern Male Radio," on LA Talk Radio in 2014. They interviewed celebrities and gave advice to help men function better in modern society.

In 2016, Hawk received much attention in tabloids after insuring his penis for one million dollars. Multiple media outlets reported on it, including TMZ, Cosmopolitan and Stylecaster.

He co-hosted the Vegas Rocks! Magazine Hair Metal Awards Show on May 15, 2016 with Sally Steele, The Scorpions and Twisted Sister.

Hawk's film credits include Gingerdead Man 2, Fortune 500 Man, G.I. Joe: The Rise of Cobra, Crawlers, and American Justice, in which he co-starred with John Schneider and Tommy "Tiny" Lister.
