= Treasure Island (1999 independent film) =

1999 American experimental independent film

- Directed by: Scott King
- Written by: Scott King
- Produced by: Adrienne Gruben
- Starring: Nick Offerman; Lance Baker; Jonah Blechman; Pat Healy; Suzy Nakamura; Rachel Singer; Stephanie Ittleson
- Cinematography: Scott King
- Edited by: Dody Dorn
- Music by: Chris Anderson
- Production company: King Pictures
- Release dates: January 24, 1999 (Sundance); March 17, 2000 (limited)
- Running time: 86 minutes
- Country: United States
- Language: English

Treasure Island is a 1999 American experimental independent film directed by Scott King. Described as a psychosexual black comedy, the story is about two war strategists on San Francisco’s Treasure Island naval base during World War II. It is inspired from an actual account of a counterintelligence ploy by two British officers. The film is shot in 16 mm and is in black and white.

== Plot ==
Frank and Samuel are two American cryptographers on Treasure Island during World War II who decode letters and look for hidden meanings behind the words. As a counterintelligence ploy, they plan to drop a dead body off the coast of Japan before an invasion. To make the body convincing, the men decide to write letters to and from him, so the Japanese army will think he is a real person.

As they write the letters, they begin to reveal things about their own lives and repressed desires. Frank, a bigamist, is married to two women and is pursuing a third wife. Samuel and his wife Penny are in a ménage à trois, which he participates in to cover up his homosexuality. As the pressures of the men’s lives begin to eat away at them, the dead body starts to torment Frank and Samuel's subconscious, interacting with the private stories of their lives.

== Cast ==
- Nick Offerman as Samuel
- Lance Baker as Frank
- Pat Healy as Clark
- Suzy Nakamura as Yo-Ji
- Rachel Singer as Anna
- Stephanie Ittleson as Stella
- Daisy Hall as Penny
- Victor Raider-Wexler as Samowitz
- JP Manoux as Officer Hughes
- Jonah Blechman as The Body
- Guinevere Turner as Evelyn
- Caveh Zahedi as Harold
- Bob Byington as Thomas
- Lisa Papineau as Diedre
- Paul Gutrecht as "Some Guy"
- Scott King as Walter

== Reception ==
The New York Times critic Stephen Holden cited the film as one of the most original features at the 1999 New York Gay and Lesbian Film Festival, describing it as a "stylish black and white film" that turns "into an eerie ghost story exploring oppressive racial and sexual stereotypes in wartime America with deadpan humor". On the review aggregator website Rotten Tomatoes, 31% of 13 critics' reviews are positive.

In 2000, Holden wrote a longer review in which he wrote Treasure Island is an "increasingly chaotic comic riff on The Man Who Never Was, Ewen Montagu's account (made into a 1956 film starring Clifton Webb) of a scheme concocted by British intelligence to mislead Germany about the invasion of Sicily." He concluded, "For all the ideas it tosses around -- and many of them are useful and painful correctives to our rose-colored fantasies [of WWII] -- Treasure Island is too crude a movie to muster much rhetorical clout. But in deconstructing a myth, it does find one ingenious parallel: its man who never was a paradigm becomes a paradigm for an era that never was. Or at least it wasn't the way we would like to remember it."

In The A.V. Club, Scott Tobias wrote Treasure Island is "a truly audacious American independent with the courage to follow its doggedly idiosyncratic convictions. Made without so much as a nod to commercial considerations, it stood out among the dramatic-competition entries at Sundance in 1999, when it won a Special Jury Prize alongside such Indiewood fare as Happy, Texas and Guinevere. But, tempting as it is to praise Treasure Island simply for being different, King's experimental pastiche of '40s technique and late-'90s transgression never quite comes together, falling victim to its own willful obscurity.

=== Accolades ===
Treasure Island won a Special Jury Prize for Distinctive Vision in Filmmaking at the 1999 Sundance Film Festival.

At the 1999 Independent Spirit Awards, it was nominated for the first John Cassavetes Award, under the name Independent Spirit Award for Best First Feature (Under $500,000).
