= Adam Neal Smith =

American actor

- Born: Dallas, Texas, United States
- Occupation(s): Film and theater actor, musician, film composer
- Years active: 2002 – present

Adam Neal Smith is a Dallas, Texas-born and Los Angeles-based film and theater actor, and musician in a band and film music composer.

== Career ==
He studied at University of North Texas majoring in history. He also took up acting lessons and enrolled in Los Angeles' Second City Conservatory.

=== Musician ===
Adam Neal Smith formed the band The Ethels in Fort Worth, Texas alongside Ethel Lung, in 2002. Smith was on vocals and guitar and Lung on vocals and drums. The band relocated to Los Angeles where Gordon Bash recorded their demo in summer of 2003. He eventually joined the band in 2005 as a bass player. The first full-length album of The Ethels was Field Trip to Cakeland released independently.

=== Actor ===
Smith also joined the 28 Cent Crew Theater Company where he played the lead role in Samuel Shem's Bill W. and Dr. Bob. He also co-wrote the play On the Brink and took on the role of Homer Morris in the travelling children's show The Morris Brothers.

He is best known for his lead role as Jeff in Yen Tan's 2008 gay-themed film Ciao in the role of Jeff, costarring with Alessandro Calza as Andrea. Ethel Lung a band co-member with Smith in The Ethels appears on some scenes in the film alongside Adam Neal Smith.

== Discography ==
As The Ethels

- 2005: Field Trip to Cakeland

== Filmography ==
=== Actor ===
Long features

- 2008: Ciao as Jeff

Shorts

- 2002: Snap as Winders (short) (credited as Adam Smith)
- 2004: Night Without Justice as FBI Agent Anderson (short) (credited as Adam Smith)
- 2004: Cowboys & Indians as Father (short)

=== Composer ===
- 2006: The Mortified Shoebox Show (TV series)
- 2007: Callback
