= The Face of Furry Creek =

- Created by: Mark Kenneth Woods
- Starring: Mark Kenneth Woods; Michael Venus; Amy Goodmurphy; Ryan Steele
- Country of origin: Canada
- No. of seasons: 2
- No. of episodes: 12

Production
- Camera setup: Single camera
- Running time: 30 minutes

Original release
- Network: OUTtv
- Release: June 3, 2013 – October 13, 2014

The Face of Furry Creek is a television series produced by MKW Productions that stars writer/comedian Mark Kenneth Woods, actors Michael Venus, Amy Goodmurphy and Ryan Steele as multiple characters competing in a small mountain town reality-show type contest. It was created by Woods and the series premiered on OUTtv on June 3, 2013 in the network's coveted Monday night 9pm time slot previously held by Season 5 of RuPaul's Drag Race.

The comedy series was conceived as a hybrid television series and online digital project. It was shot in the style of reality television and includes a fictional contest website with additional media not seen on television.

The Face of Furry Creek debuted to critical acclaim with Homorazzi.com calling the show "very clever and entertaining" with "fresh ideas" while Blouin ArtInfo called the series "gutsy satire that deserves more attention" and praised Woods' performance in particular saying "Woods deserves a bigger stage".

On November 6, 2013, it was confirmed that the TV series would return for a second season in the summer of 2014 and include an additional digital companion project. Season 2 debuted on September 8, 2014.

All 12 episodes were released on the show's website for a limited time worldwide on June 1, 2015.

== Episode list ==
| No. | Title | Written by | Original release date |
|---|---|---|---|
| 101 | "Meet the Faces" | Mark Kenneth Woods | 3 June 2013 |
Five desperate citizens in financial trouble decide to enter a contest to find “the face” of their small town’s new tourism campaign.
| 102 | "Blurgs" | Mark Kenneth Woods | 10 June 2013 |
The contestants are asked to write a blog post but Deb’s troubled past emerges when new neighbours move in. Chad and Guy decide to rate Furry Creek’s finest ladies and Greg takes a liking to their new homestay.
| 103 | "Facelikes and Twats" | Mark Kenneth Woods | 17 June 2013 |
As the contestants take on social media, a clueless Deb suddenly becomes obsessed, Chad and Guy ponder what women really want, Greg takes the challenge too far and a contestant is caught in the bush.
| 104 | "PSAs and Perverts" | Mark Kenneth Woods | 24 June 2013 |
Deb is put on a strict diet when the contestants are asked to create a public service announcement, Chad and Guy fight over a new girl in town, Liz plans an intervention and another contestant is eliminated.
| 105 | "Sex and the Diversity" | Mark Kenneth Woods | 1 July 2013 |
Liz receives a threat, a jealous Guy gets revenge, Deb tries to use sex appeal to get ahead and the competition gets ugly when the contestants are asked to show Furry Creek’s diversity.
| 106 | "The Face" | Mark Kenneth Woods | 8 July 2013 |
Sisi consoles Deb when her greatest fear comes alive, Chad tries to piece a mystery together and the final three contestants face off in the last challenge where a winner is declared.
| 201 | "Season 2%" | Mark Kenneth Woods | 8 September 2014 |
As tourists leave Furry Creek in droves, last year's winner announces a brand new contest and five determined citizens enter to compete to be "the face" of their town's new tourism campaign.
| 202 | "Pride and Mostly Prejudice" | Mark Kenneth Woods | 15 September 2014 |
The contestants are asked to create “Mine” Loop videos about what makes them proud as Deb receives a job offer and an unwelcome visitor.
| 203 | "Bullying A Deb" | Mark Kenneth Woods | 22 September 2014 |
As Channel 12 is accused of rigging the contest, the top 5 are asked to create an anti-bullying video but resort to bullying in order to get ahead.
| 204 | "Musical Fruit" | Mark Kenneth Woods | 29 September 2014 |
Deb meets a new “man friend” and a foreign corporation expresses interest in Furry Creek as the remaining contestants are asked to create a song in this musical-themed episode.
| 205 | "Freedumb" | Mark Kenneth Woods | 6 October 2014 |
The remaining finalists are asked to create a commercial refuting Furry Creek’s bad reputation as one of the contestants tests the limits of freedom of speech and the tiny Guatemalan mafia pays Sisi a visit.
| 206 | "Das Ende" | Mark Kenneth Woods | 13 October 2014 |
Deb and Sisi’s relationship hits a new low as the final three contestants are asked to create a live segment for Channel 12 News and a winner is declared.
