= Arizona Sky =

- Directed by: Jeff London
- Written by: Jeff London
- Produced by: Jeff London; David Clayton Miller
- Starring: Eric Dean; Blaise Embry; Kyle Buchland; Jayme McCabe
- Cinematography: Matthew Skala
- Edited by: Brent Revok
- Release date: November 18, 2008
- Running time: 92 minutes
- Country: United States
- Language: English

Arizona Sky is a 2008 independent gay-themed romantic drama that was written, directed, and produced by Jeff London. Filmed in Lake Havasu City, Arizona and Bakersfield, California in the spirit of Brokeback Mountain, Arizona Sky follows the lives of two young men from rural America who fall in love as teenagers and find a way to rekindle that love later in life.

== Plot ==
Arizona Sky is a romantic story of two high school buddies who reconnect with desire in their hearts. As the film opens, the teenagers Kyle and Jake are getting together for what appears to be a regular ritual of sleeping under the desert stars. The passions of first love are evident in these two young men. They eat some supper and then curl up on blankets for an evening of necking in the back of Kyle's truck. This happy interlude is at an end, as Jake is set to move with his dad to the big city.

Fifteen years pass and the film picks up with an adult Jake now a successful film producer with a stressed and loveless life. After an anxiety attack, Jake's assistant Brian urges him to take a break from all stresses for the first time in years, encouraging him that it's time to take a vacation and step back from his troubles. This is seconded by Jake's friend Steve, who agrees to accompany Jake to his hometown in Arizona to help him find himself and unwind.

Once more in Arizona, Jake finds Kyle's Aunt Elaine listed in the local phone book. Through her he finds that Kyle is a breakfast cook for a local diner as well as a ranch hand and mechanic with his cousin Heath. The two now-grown men reconnect and discover the spark is still there. Though Kyle is in the closet with his desires, all of his feelings spill to the surface as he and his old friend get to know each other better.

== Cast ==
- Eric Dean as adult Jake
- Blaise Embry as young Jake
- Kyle Buckland as young Kyle
- Jayme McCabe as adult Kyle
- Patricia Place as Aunt Elaine
- Evan Cuthbert as Brian
- Brent King as Steve
- Emerson Smith as Heath
- Bernadette Murray as Cora

== Reception ==
Arizona Sky was an official selection of the Philadelphia Gay and Lesbian International Film Festival. The film saw a DVD release on November 18, 2008.

== Additional sources ==
- Philly Gay Calendar
