= Jimmy Clabots =

American actor

- Born: James Ryan Clabots; November 12, 1980 (age 45)
- Occupation: CranioSacral Therapist
- Years active: 2023–present
- Website: biohackerrehab.com

James Ryan Clabots (born 1980) is a CranioSacral Therapist, Alexander Technique teacher, and Physical Therapist Assistant. In 2009 he became a male escort, and retired in 2012.

In 2023 he co-wrote Christmas Couples Retreat.

== Career ==
In 2004 he starred in the Snow White Musical at Disneyland. In 2008 Clabots started his career as an actor in the comedy film Another Gay Sequel: Gays Gone Wild!. In 2011 he starred in Showtime's Gigolos, showing male escorts in Las Vegas, but left the show in 2012 when he retired from escorting.

== Personal life ==
Clabots is of Cuban, Spanish, and Belgian descent. He’s second cousins with Miami Mayor Francis Suarez, and West Virginia State Representative Alex Mooney.

== Filmography ==
=== Film ===
Year	Title	Role	Notes
2005	The Recorder	Jared	Short film
2008	Another Gay Sequel: Gays Gone Wild!	Jarod	
2009	Angels & Demons	Vatican Choir Member	
2009	It's Complicated	Chase	
2010	Go Go Reject	Jock Strap	Short film
2013	The Fall of 1980	Joe	
2021	Outside	Wesley	
2023	Christmas Couples Retreat	Scott	Post Production

=== Television ===
Year	Title	Role	Notes
2010	Party Down	Valhalla Caterer	Episode: 2x07
2011	CSI: Crime Scene Investigation	Douglas Nathan Haskell	Episode: 11x22
2011	The League	Nathan Extra	Episode: 3x06
2011–2012	Gigolos	Himself	Reality television (Season 1–2)
2012	Jane by Design	Man in bar	Episode: 1x09
2017	Potstop	Clark	Episodes 3
2021	No Such Thing	Don	Episodes 5
