= Pride (Canadian TV series) =

Canadian documentary television series

Pride: The LGBTQ+ History Series is a Canadian documentary television series, which premiered on OUTtv in 2019. Created by Mark Kenneth Woods, the series features Woods and friends travelling to various LGBT Pride festivals around the world to explore LGBTQ+ history.

The first season of the series visited Calgary, New York City, Salt Lake City, Palm Springs, Hong Kong and Berlin. The second season visited San Francisco, Johannesburg, Halifax, Manchester, Miami and Auckland. The third season visited Phoenix, Dublin, Provincetown, Puerto Vallarta and Vancouver. The fourth season visited Honolulu, Stockholm, Mexico City, Montreal, Charlotte and Melbourne. The fifth season visited Chicago, Manila, New Orleans, Toronto, Las Vegas and Amsterdam.

The series has received 13 Leo Award nominations (with two wins) and 4 Canadian Screen Award nominations.
