= Jey Crisfar =

Belgian actor

- Born: 24 April 1988 (age 36); La Louvière, Belgium
- Occupation: Actor

Jey Crisfar (born Jeremy Di Cristofaro on 24 April 1988 in La Louvière) is a Belgian actor and artist.

== Work ==
He became known playing the lead role in Bruce LaBruce's Otto; or Up with Dead People (2008). The character he plays is a zombie named Otto and he toured extensively with the film through festivals. The May 2008 issue of British magazine Dazed & Confused includes an exclusive photography session with him, shot by New York-based visual artist Terence Koh. He has also had exclusive photoshoots with photographers Adelaide Ivánova and fashion photographer and video artist Pierre Debusschere, being featured in the music video for British duo Society's track "Future Days", directed by the latter.

He was interviewed in 2011, as part of the documentary The Advocate for Fagdom by Angélique Bosio about queercore filmmaker Bruce La Bruce,

== Filmography ==
- 2008 : Otto; Or Up With Dead People by Bruce LaBruce
