= Michael Venus (entertainer) =

Canadian artist, actor and producer (born 1973)

Michael Venus is a Canadian artist, actor and producer.

Born October 9, 1973, in Kapuskasing, Ontario, Canada, Venus moved to Windsor, Ontario, at the age of 18 where he began working in the arts community of Windsor and nearby Detroit. There, with friends, he formed the artist collective "House of Venus" and began putting on various art shows, club nights and other events including an annual wearable art and wig festival called "Wiggle" which continues to this day. In 1995, he moved to Vancouver, British Columbia where he worked as an artist and event producer for 18 years.

In the mid 1990s, Michael also began work as his drag alter ego Miss Cotton who is House Mother and leading "Venus Girl" Cotton has done numerous stage and television work including legendary NYC Outdoor Drag Festival, "Wigstock" in 1999, starring in The New Pornographer's music video for "Sing Me Spanish Techno"and hostessing and curating the pre-show for the Official 2010 International Olympic Committee afterparty introducing INXS. In the year 2000 Michael started the Icons and Demigods photo series where he collaborates with photographers recreating "POP" and "subculture images that shaped his aesthetic. In 2003 the first 17 images were exhibited at 1.6 Gallery in Venus Rising which was also the spotlight piece on Fashion Television the following year. In 2010 Venus put together another show and catalogue featuring 50 works in the series. Michael also produced short super 8 experimental films he shot through the late 1990s in Vancouver called "Supa 8". In 2012 he revisiting the series and is working on another eight. In 2009 Michael created many different Andy Warhol wigs for Douglas Coupland's "Mum and Dad" exhibit. In 2012 for Toronto Nuit Blanche Michael co-starred, cast and styled Coupland's "Museum of The Rapture".

In 2001, Venus began collaborating with filmmakers including Mark Kenneth Woods with whom he would later help produce the World's first LGBT sketch comedy series called the House of Venus Show. The series began airing nationally in Canada on OUTtv in 2005 and would later air in France, Belgium, Switzerland on Pink TV, The Netherlands on OUTtv and the United States on the here! network. He also co-produced and co-starred in the feature film Deb and Sisi which premiered at the Out On Screen Vancouver Queer Film Festival in August 2008. in 2013 and 2014 co-stars in the TV comedy The Face of Furry Creek on OUTtv for two seasons. Michael is working on 5 publications and celebrated numerous events to celebrate the House of Venus 20th anniversary in Toronto for World Pride and Vancouver for Wiggle 20 (Vancouver Art Gallery and Fox Cabaret). For World Pride Michael co-produced the stage Venus Rising with Peaches, Hercules and Love Affair and others like DJ Dickey Doo. Michael won Throbbing Rose Art Collective award for the first ever Nuit Rose festival during World Pride for his Icons and Demigods Show. Michael is currently working in Snow Queen- a herstory and expose of drag in Canada and a few other documentaries for OutSpoken Series on Out TV.

== Filmography ==
Director

- 2002: Wayoutwest.tv (segment director in 4 episodes) (TV series)

Writer

- 2005–2009: House of Venus Show (segment writer) (TV series)

Actor

- 2000: Wonderland as Drag Queen of Hearts (short)
- 2002: Pimp & Ho: Licence to Queer as Dr. Normal's voice (short)
- 2002: Pimp & Ho: Queer Fashion Crime Models as Christian Wright (short)
- 2002: Wayoutwest.tv (3 episodes - TV series)
- 2004: Holy Matrimony Billy! as Billy (short)
- 2005–2009: House of Venus Show (TV series)
- 2008: Deb and Sisi as Sisi Sickles
- 2011: Vance and Pepe's Porn Start as Vance Vanderbilt
- 2013: The Face of Furry Creek as Sisi Sickles/Chad Chad/Liz Lipinski/Brenda Bergman
