= Aaron Michael Davies =

American actor

- Born: February 7, 1984 (age 42); Hampton, Iowa, U.S.
- Education: Professional Children's School
- Occupation: Actor
- Years active: 2004–2014
- Known for: Griff on Another Gay Sequel: Gays Gone Wild
- Partner: single

Aaron Michael Davies (born February 7, 1984) is an American retired actor. He is best known for playing the role of Griff in Another Gay Sequel: Gays Gone Wild in 2008. He has been in a few short movies as well as teen.comTV's Haute & Bothered.

== Filmography ==
Genre	Year	Title	Role	Episodes	Notes
Short film	2004	Hizu Shstapel	Tzvenvi		8 minutes
Film	2008	Another Gay Sequel: Gays Gone Wild!	Griff		
Film	2008	Between Love & Goodbye	Danny		
Short film	2008	Lloyd Neck	Taylor		16 minutes
Short film	2009	Astoria, Queens	Thom		21 minutes
TV series	2009–2010	Haute & Bothered	Alexander	Episode 1x01–1x02 Episode 2x01–2x04	6 episodes total
Short film	2009	I Quit	Finn Page		20 minutes
TV series	2013	Blue Bloods	Protester #1		Episode 3x17
Webseries	2014	Hustling	Simon's Assistant		Episode 3x07
