= The Young and Evil =

- Directed by: Julian Breece
- Written by: Julian Breece
- Produced by: Aaliyah Williams
- Cinematography: Carl Bartels
- Edited by: Avi Youabian
- Music by: Gary Gunn
- Release date: June 20, 2008 (Frameline Film Festival)
- Running time: 15 minutes
- Country: United States
- Language: English

The Young and Evil is a 2008 short film directed by Julian Breece, in which a sexually promiscuous teenager actively pursues unprotected sex in order to catch HIV. The title is inspired by the 1933 book by Charles Henri Ford and Parker Tyler.

== Credits ==
=== Cast ===
- Vaughn Lowery as Karel Andrews
- Mark Berry as Naaman
- Heather Halley as Doctor
- Eric Pumphrey as Julio
- Raja as Maxis

=== Production ===
- Julian Breece - Director
- Aaliyah Williams - Producer
- Carl Bartels - Director of Photography
- Gary Gunn - Music
- Jenna Sanders - Production Designer
- Earl Moore - Costume Designer
- Avi Youabian - Editor

== Critical reception ==
The Young and Evil was selected for the 2009 Palm Springs International Festival of Short Films, Frameline 32, the Sundance Film Festival and the Urbanworld Film Festival.

The film was a nominee for the 2008 Iris Prize.
