= Ciao (film) =

- Ciao movie poster
- Directed by: Yen Tan
- Written by: Yen Tan; Alessandro Calza
- Produced by: Jim McMahon Adam Neal Smith Mr. Calza Charles W. Blaum Ethel Lung John S. Boles Margaret Lake
- Starring: Adam Neal Smith; Alessandro Calza; Charles W. Blaum; Ethel Lung
- Cinematography: Michael Victor Roy
- Edited by: David Patrick Lowery
- Music by: Stephan Altman
- Distributed by: Regent Releasing; Here! Films
- Release dates: March 30, 2008 (AFI Dallas Film Festival); December 5, 2008 (United States)
- Running time: 87 minutes
- Country: United States
- Languages: English, Italian

Ciao is a 2008 gay independent film directed and co-written by Yen Tan and starring Adam Neal Smith, Alessandro Calza, Charles W. Blaum and Ethel Lung.

== Synopsis ==
With the slogan "If you could go back... what would you say to the one you loved", Ciao (meaning both hello and goodbye in Italian) tells the story of two men who form an unlikely bond when a mutual friend named Mark (played by Charles W. Blaum) dies unexpectedly in a car crash in Dallas

Mark's best friend Jeff (Adam Neal Smith) is left with the task of going through Mark's personal effects and informing relatives and friends of his death. While going through Mark's e-mails to let people know about his passing, Jeff discovers that Mark was corresponding with an Italian man named Andrea (Alessandro Calza), who had already planned a trip to fly to Dallas to visit Mark for the first time without knowing he had actually died.

Jeff invites Andrea to come to Texas anyway and stay with him for two days at his place. Ciao portrays these two days where the two bereaved friends one from Dallas and the other from Italy meet and talk mostly about Mark and the impact he had on both of them in a close, personal and frank manner. Through these intimate conversations, the two men form a rapport that grows, and they are soon drawn together both by their connection with the deceased Mark, and by a growing intimacy with each other. Andrea has to leave at the end of his two-day stay, but invites Jeff to Italy for a visit at some later date.

== Cast ==
- Adam Neal Smith as Jeff
- Alessandro Calza as Andrea
- Charles W. Blaum as Mark
- Ethel Lung as Lauren
- John S. Boles as Larry, Mark's Father
- Margaret Lake as Margaret, Mark's Mother
- Tiffany Vollmer as Doctor

== Production ==
Ciao was made on a very small budget and was co-written by Yen Tan and actor Alessandro Calza. The film was produced by Jim McMahon, co-produced and edited by David Patrick Lowery, and co-produced by James M. Johnston, who also served as the 1st assistant director.

== Reception ==
The film received mixed reviews. Ruthe Stein from the San Francisco Chronicle praised the acting, but like some other reviewers criticised the "snails pace" of the movie's story. AfterElton named Ciao "the best gay movie I've seen this year" and the Los Angeles Times called it "a revelation; a minimalist work of maximum effect".

== Soundtrack ==
Score composed by Stephan Altman released digitally in November 11, 2010. A Chinese version of the movie release included the song "Five Times a Minute".

All tracks are written by Stephan Altman.

No.	Title	Length
1.	"Opening"	4:28
2.	"Doctors Office"	0:48
3.	"Bedtime"	1:11
4.	"Marks House"	1:09
5.	"Country And Western"	2:04
6.	"Cityscape"	1:23
7.	"Airport"	3:36
Total length:		14:39

== Awards ==
The film won the Jury Prize / Best Feature Film at the Philadelphia International Gay & Lesbian Film Festival, the Queer Lion at Venice Film Festival, was given honorable mention at the Dallas International Film Festival, and was part of the Official Selection for Outline Framefest Newline.
