= Jonah Blechman =

American actor

- Born: Jonah Ethan Blechman; February 8, 1975 (age 51); San Mateo County, California, U.S.
- Occupations: Actor, producer, singer, costume designer
- Years active: 1992–present

Jonah Ethan Blechman (born February 8, 1975) is an American actor. He has appeared in This Boy's Life with Leonardo DiCaprio and stars in Another Gay Movie alongside Jonathan Chase and Michael Carbonaro and the sequel Another Gay Sequel: Gays Gone Wild!.

Following the release of Another Gay Movie, Blechman came out as gay.

== Television ==
- Empty Cradle as Patrick
- The Commish (episode "The Kid") as Mikey Colyer
- Walker, Texas Ranger (episodes "Whitewater: Part 1" & "Whitewater: Part 2") as Damian Cheever
- Seduced by Madness (episodes "1.1" & "1.2") as Josh Yanke
- The Rockford Files as Tennison Keats
- Dawson's Creek (episode "Four Scary Stories") as Tad

== Film ==
- This Boy's Life as Arthur Gayle
- Fall Time as Joe
- Treasure Island as The Body
- $pent as Scott
- Beyond the Pale as Dylan
- Luster as Billy
- Another Gay Movie as Nico
- Arc as Kenny
- Another Gay Sequel: Gays Gone Wild! as Nico
- Swan Song as Tristan
