= Euriamis Losada =

Cuban American actor (born 1983)

- Born: October 23, 1983 (age 41)
- Occupation: Actor
- Years active: 2005; 2008–2012; 2014; 2016–present
- Partner: Single

Euriamis Losada (born October 23, 1983) is a Cuban American actor. He is best known for playing the role of Luis in Another Gay Sequel: Gays Gone Wild in 2008.

== Filmography ==
=== Film ===
Year	Title	Role	Notes
2005	Che: Part One	Carlos	
2009	Border Line	Jose	short
2010	Wish Makers of West Hollywood	Jose de La Cruz	short
2011	Where the Road Meets the Sun	Spikey	
2011	The Wish Makers of West Hollywood	El Cubano	
2011	Troy: Naked Boys Behind Bars, Sing!	Rigo	voice
2012	Overnight	Officer Stephens	
2012	The Three Bilinguals	Singer at Wake/Party	short
2016	Stroke of Luck	Jarod	short
2018	Aperture: Part 1	Captain Mike Alvarez	short
2019	Something for Cynitra	Benito	short

=== TV shows ===
Year	Title	Role	Notes
2008	Cold Case	Jorge Gomez	Episode 6x10
2009	Gay Top Gun	Maverick	
2010	The Subpranos	Manny Gomez	Episode 1x07
2014	Trophy Wife (TV series)	Rogelio	Episode 1x18
2014	Who in the World Is Sandra Barker?	Brian	
2016	How to Be a Vampire	Amadeus	4 episodes
2016	Simple Lives	Mateo	Episode 1x05–1x06
2017	Powerless (TV series)	Reporter	Episode 1x08
2017–2018	202 (TV–series)	Dave	9 episodes
2019	Last Call	Tony	Episode 1x10
