= The Ryan and Amy Show =

Canadian comedy duo, founded 2007

- Formation: April 28, 2007
- Type: Theatre group
- Purpose: Sketch Comedy
- Location: Vancouver, British Columbia, Canada
- Members: Ryan Steele, Amy Goodmurphy
- Notable members: Baby, Monster, Smoker Girl, Ladies of the Day, Moms over Miami
- Website: beacons.ai/ryanandamyshow

The Ryan and Amy Show is a Vancouver-based Canadian sketch comedy duo composed of Ryan Steele and Amy Goodmurphy. They have toured Canada and the United States including doing Sketch Fest in Montreal and Vancouver as well as Just for Laughs. The group produces sketch comedy shorts that are distributed via YouTube and on their website, but have appeared on other sites as well such as Funny or Die. Goodmurphy and Steele have starred together in on television shows, including: The Funny Pit (2012) with Roman Danylo; The Face of Furry Creek (2013–2014); and a 2011 episode of the series Out For Laughs. Steele appeared on the 2014 season of The Amazing Race Canada, finishing in third place with co-worker Rob Goddard. Goodmurphy has appeared on Super Channel's Too Much Information (2014–2015), as well as the 2019 comedy film 37-Teen. In 2016, the duo was nominated for a Canadian Comedy Award in the inaugural presentation of the Best Live Ensemble category. In early 2018 the duo's short film White Wine Boys Club won first prize at the Vancouver Just for Laughs Film Festival, as well as the Grand Prize competing Internationally against other JFL Film Festival winners. The Ryan and Amy Show signed with Hadron Films to produce a 22-minute sketch comedy pilot, produced by Miles Forster & Chris Wilkinson.

== Members ==
=== Ryan Steele ===
Ryan Steele grew up in the city of Langley, British Columbia, where he graduated from H. D. Stafford Secondary School. He became interested in comedy at an early age, and started making comedy videos in his early teens, with early successes 'Ferry Death' and 'Big Mac Attack'. After being diagnosed with testicular cancer at 19, he gave up the dream of being a comedian for a while. In his late 20s, he went to a Tony Robbins' like workshop where he was told to start doing Sketch Comedy, so he started his own ensemble sketch show.

=== Amy Goodmurphy ===
Amy Goodmurphy grew up in North Vancouver, British Columbia, and is a St. Thomas Aquinas Regional Secondary School alumna. She started comedy at the age of 23 after meeting Steele at the bar where he worked. He convinced her it would be worth her while to join his ensemble sketch show. It was not, so she started studying acting at Vancouver Acting School, graduating in 2012.

== Viral song ==
In May 2017 the duo had a viral hit with a parody song about the town of Kelowna, British Columbia racking up over 43,000 views for the video in its first two days. In the video, performing as Moms over Miami, they sang "My Sharona" by the Knack, but with lyrics poking fun at the town.

== Cameo ==
In 2019, Ryan and Amy released their eponymous film, The Ryan & Amy Show. That same year, they joined the 30,000 other celebrities on the Cameo website, selling short personalized messages requested by fans.
