= Yen Tan =

American film director

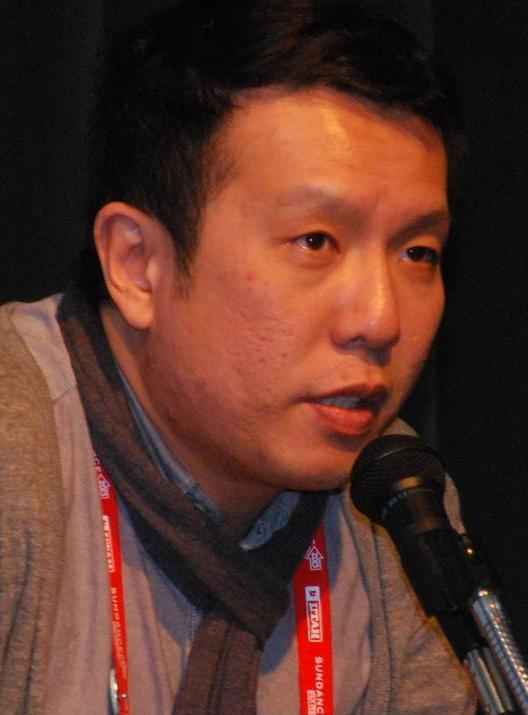
- Yen Tan in 2013
- Born: March 12, 1975 (age 51); Malaysia
- Occupations: Film director, screenwriter, producer
- Years active: 2002–present

Yen Tan (born March 12, 1975) is a Malaysian-born American independent film producer and director.

== Early life ==
Tan emigrated from Malaysia at the age of 19 and is based in Dallas, Texas.

== Career ==
He is known for award-winning films Happy Birthday (2002) and Deadroom (2005). He also directed the gay-themed Ciao (2008) that he had co-written with the film's lead actor Alessandro Calza.

His screenwriting lab semi-finalist screenplay Pit Stop was selected by the Outfest Screenwriting Lab. The film also screened at the 2013 Sundance Film Festival. He was also a finalist for the Vilcek Prize for Creative Promise.

== Personal life ==
Tan is openly gay.

== Filmography ==
=== Director ===
Feature films

- 2002: Happy Birthday
- 2005: Deadroom (Co-directed with James M. Johnston, David Lowery and Nick Prendergast)
- 2008: Ciao
- 2013: Pit Stop
- 2018: 1985
- 2024: All That We Love

Shorts

- 2001: Love Stories
- 2008: Coda
- 2011: Wanted
- 2016: 1985

=== Producer ===
- 2005: Deadroom
- 2008: Coda (short)
- 2008: My Mom Smokes Weed (short)

=== Actor ===
- 2011: 3 Thumbs Up as himself (documentary)

== Awards ==
For Happy Birthday

- 2002: Won the Jury Prize for "Best Feature - Gay Male" at the Philadelphia International Gay & Lesbian Film Festival
- 2002: Won New Directors Showcase - Bets Feature award at the Portland LGBT Film Festival
- Also earned an honorable mention at Image+Nation in Montreal

For Deadroom

- 2005: Won Director's Award at the Texas Film Festival (sharing with James M. Johnston, David Lowery and Nick Prendergast)
