= Another Gay Sequel: Gays Gone Wild! =

2008 film by Todd Stephens

- Theatrical release poster
- Directed by: Todd Stephens
- Screenplay by: Todd Stephens
- Story by: Todd Stephens; Eric Eisenbrey
- Produced by: Eric Eisenbrey; Todd Stephens; Jonah Blechman; Derek Curl
- Starring: Jonah Blechman; Jake Mosser; Aaron Michael Davies; Jimmy Clabots; RuPaul; Lady Bunny; Will Wikle; Euriamis Losada; Brent Corrigan; Lypsinka; Jim Verraros; Colton Ford; Amanda Lepore; Michael Lucas; Perez Hilton; Scott Thompson
- Cinematography: Carl Bartels
- Edited by: Spencer Schilly
- Music by: Marty Beller
- Production companies: Luna Pictures; Caveat Pictures
- Distributed by: TLA Releasing
- Release dates: June 28, 2008 (Frameline); August 29, 2008 (United States); November 6, 2008 (Germany)
- Running time: 99 minutes
- Countries: United States; Germany
- Languages: English; Spanish
- Budget: $500,000
- Box office: $104,828

Another Gay Sequel: Gays Gone Wild! is a 2008 romantic comedy film directed by Todd Stephens. It is the sequel to the 2006 film Another Gay Movie, and features five cast members from the first film: Jonah Blechman (Nico Hunter), Ashlie Atkinson (Dawn Muffler), Scott Thompson (Mr. Wilson), Stephanie McVay (Mrs. Hunter), and Andersen Gabrych. It was released in seven theaters and ran for 10 weeks before its DVD release. It had a negative reception, in contrast to the first film, which developed a small cult following.

Nancy Sinatra, who sang the song "Another Gay Sunshine Day" for the first film, receives "special thanks". Singer RuPaul announced on his website that he and Lady Bunny had recorded a song for the soundtrack that would be released as a single, but the producers of the film ultimately scrapped that song. They used a solo song by Lady Bunny instead. That song was not released as a single, and was replaced by the song "The Clap" by Perez Hilton. The duet of RuPaul and Lady Bunny was later released as a bonus track on RuPaul's album Champion, under the name "Throw Ya Hands Up".

== Plot ==
Dorky Andy (Jake Mosser), flamboyant Nico (Jonah Blechman), jock Jarod (Jimmy Clabots), and nerdy Griff (Aaron Michael Davies) reunite in Fort Lauderdale for spring break. The plot revolves around a contest—"Gays Gone Wild!"—to see who can have sex with the most guys during the duration of spring break. The winner will be crowned "Miss Gay Gone Wild".

While Andy seems to have no problem getting men to have sex with him, Nico has not been attracting men at all. He has a frequent fantasy sequence involving a merman (Brent Corrigan). Andy is troubled, however, when he falls hard for Luis (Euriamis Losada), a charming, handsome virgin. Jarod and Griff are also having problems, as they have become a couple, and are conflicted over whether to enter the contest. Meanwhile, a trio by the name of Jasper (Will Wikle, Brand Lim, and Isaac Webster) seem to be eager to win the contest by any means.

In a subplot, the guys meet Perez Hilton on an airplane. Hilton pursues a young priest to the bathroom; he hits his head and becomes a religious zealot trying to suppress the gay activities. He is later hit in the head again and changes back.

== Cast ==
- Jonah Blechman as Nico Hunter
- Jake Mosser as Andy Wilson
- Aaron Michael Davies as Orson Griffin "Griff"
- Jimmy Clabots as Jarod
- Euriamis Losada as Luis
- Perez Hilton as himself
- RuPaul as Tyrell Tyrelle
- Scott Thompson as Mr. Wilson
- Lady Bunny as Sandi Cove
- Will Wikle as Jasper
- Brandon Lim as Jasper Chan
- Isaac Webster as Jasper Pledge / Fake Griff
- Brent Corrigan as Stan the Merman
- Lypsinka as Mrs. Wilson
- Amanda Lepore as Debbie Gottakunt
- Willam Belli as Nancy Needatwat

== Production ==
Most filming took place in Fort Lauderdale, with a few final scenes done in Los Angeles. Shooting wrapped in December 2007. The film premiered at the Frameline Film Festival in San Francisco on June 28, 2008.

The film's opening spoofed The Wizard of Oz. The actors portraying Andy (Michael Carbonaro), Jarod (Jonathan Chase), and Griff (Mitch Morris) in the first film were killed, in a partial explanation of the actors' absence from the sequel. Mrs. Hunter (Stephanie McVay) later said that "doing two gay movies in a row will make people think you're actually gay", an allusion as to what the actors' agents may have said.

== Critical reception ==
The film received 20% on the Rotten Tomatoes meter.
