= Mark Kenneth Woods =

Canadian film director (born ?)

- Born: Montreal, Quebec, Canada
- Education: University of Toronto; York University
- Occupations: Actor; producer

Mark Kenneth Woods (date of birth unknown) is a Canadian writer, actor, producer, director and TV host.

== Biography ==
Woods was born in Montreal, Quebec, Canada. He graduated from University of Toronto's cinema studies program and continued with a Master's degree in communication and cultural studies from York University in Toronto.

Woods is a filmmaker, writer and actor who works in film, video and television. He is best known for writing, producing and acting on the TV series and digital project The Face of Furry Creek and the House of Venus Show which initially aired on OutTV in Canada, and his commercial for Starbucks featuring Bianca Del Rio and Adore Delano called "Coffee Frenemies" which has been viewed over 1 million times.

Woods has also produced and directed several documentaries including Is The Village Dying? about the state of LGBT neighbourhoods, Take Up the Torch (co-directed with Michael Yerxa) about the LGBT sports movement in Canada and This Is Drag featuring Bianca Del Rio, Adore Delano and Courtney Act which was released exclusively in Canada on March 2, 2015.

Woods' latest feature documentary Two Soft Things, Two Hard Things explores the challenges faced by LGBTQ Inuit in Nunavut and how a new generation is forging a more inclusive society. The film had its world premiere on June 3, 2016, at the Inside Out Film and Video Festival In Toronto.

In 2019, Woods debuted the documentary television series Pride, which travels around the world to profile different LGBT Pride festivals, for OUTtv. The series has been nominated for 13 Leo Awards (and two wins) and 4 Canadian Screen Awards.

== Filmography ==
=== Director / Producer / Writer ===
(Selected works)

- 2019-: Pride: The LGBTQ+ History Series (TV series)
- 2016: Two Soft Things, Two Hard Things (feature documentary)
- 2015: Take Up The Torch (TV documentary)
- 2015: They Came From Venus (TV documentary)
- 2015: This Is Drag (TV documentary)
- 2014: Coffee Frenemies (Starbucks) (commercial)
- 2013-2014: The Face of Furry Creek (TV series)
- 2013: Is the Village Dying? (feature documentary)
- 2011: Vance and Pepe's Porn Start (TV special)
- 2008: Deb and Sisi (feature film)
- 2005-2009: House of Venus Show (TV series)
- Pimp and Ho series
  - 2009: Pimp & Ho: The Dragon Fairy (short)
  - 2006: Pimp & Ho: Sissy Sins (short)
  - 2005: Pimp & Ho: Terror in Pansy Hills (short)
  - 2002: Pimp & Ho: Queer Fashion Crime Models (short)
  - 2002: Pimp & Ho: Licence To Queer (short)
  - 2001: Pimp & Ho: Adventures in Queersploitation (short)
- 2007: "The Wiggle Show" (associate producer) (TV documentary)
- 2005: My Heart Belongs to Data (short)
- 2005: White(ness) (short)
- 2004: Holy Matrimonmy Billy! (short)
- 2004: Shop Until We All Drop (short)
- 2003: 6 PM in America (short)
- 2002: Public Gender Announcements (short)
- 2002: Wayoutwest.tv (co-producer, segment director and segment writer) (TV series)
- 2001: The Heterosexual Agenda (short)
- 2000: Thank You Kate Bornstein (short)

=== Actor ===
(Selected works)

- 2014: Coffee Frenemies as "Adore's Assistant's (Voice Over)" (Starbucks Commercial)
- 2013-2014: The Face of Furry Creek as Deborah Dyer/Mario Mancini/Guy Gagnier/Greg Gresmire-Lipinski/Yoshi Yonescu/Nate "Niner" Naylor/Kimberney Kregs/Princesa Puerta/Wolfgang Wald (TV series)
- 2013: Is the Village Dying? as Narrator (feature documentary)
- 2011: Vance and Pepe's Porn Start as Pepe Perez (TV special)
- 2008: Deb and Sisi as Deborah Dyer (feature film)
- 2005-2009: House of Venus Show as Various (18 episodes) (TV series)
- Pimp and Ho series as Jonny Pimp
  - 2008: Pimp & Ho: The Dragon Fairy (short)
  - 2005: Pimp & Ho: Sissy Sins (short)
  - 2005: Pimp & Ho: Terror in Pansy Hills (short) (also Yoshi Isadike)
  - 2002: Pimp & Ho: Queer Fashion Crime Models (short)
  - 2001: Pimp & Ho: Licence To Queer (short)
  - 2001: Pimp & Ho: Adventures in Queersploitation (short)
- 2005: White(ness) as Narrator (short)
- 2004: Holy Matrimonmy Billy! as Richard Liss (short)
- 2004: Shop Until We All Drop as Deb (short)
- 2003: 6 PM in America as Mario Faglioni (short)
- 2002: Public Gender Announcements as Narrator (short)
- 2002: Wayoutwest.tv as Various (TV series)
- 2001: The Heterosexual Agenda as Dr. Marc. W Boucher (short)
- 2000: Thank You Kate Bornstein as Narrator (short)
