= List of comedy and variety television programs with LGBT cast members =

The following is a sortable listing of comedy and variety television programs which include LGBTQ+ cast members.

== Comedy and variety programs ==
Year	Title	Network	Actor	Notes
1968–1973	Rowan & Martin's Laugh-In	NBC	Lily Tomlin (1969–1973)	
1974-1977	Porridge	BBC	Christopher Biggins (1969–1973)	Biggins played Lukewarm, a prison inmate with a longterm partner
1975–	Saturday Night Live	NBC	Terry Sweeney (1985–1986), Danitra Vance (1985–1986), Kate McKinnon (2012–2022), John Milhiser (2013–2014), Bowen Yang (2019–2025), Punkie Johnson (2020–2024), Molly Kearney (2022-present)	Sweeney was the first SNL cast member to be openly gay during his tenure on the series. Kearney was the first non-binary cast member hired.
1976–1977	The Brady Bunch Hour	ABC	Robert Reed	
1978-1981	The Kenny Everett Video Show	Thames Television	Kenny Everett	
1981-1987	The Kenny Everett Television Show	BBC	Kenny Everett	
1985-1986	The S and M Comic Book	CBC	Tommy Sexton, Greg Malone	
1987-1992	CODCO	CBC	Tommy Sexton, Greg Malone	All five members of the troupe, gay or not, cross-dressed to play opposite-gender roles; Malone and Sexton were known for their impersonations of celebrity women such as Queen Elizabeth, Barbara Walters and Barbara Frum. Their other recurring characters included Jerome and Duncan, a flamboyant pair of gay lawyers.
1988-1995	The Kids in the Hall	CBC, HBO	Scott Thompson	Troupe member Scott Thompson is openly gay and discusses this in monologues as himself and as his character Buddy Cole; the show also features many other sketches with gay themes, notably "Steps," a series of sketches about three gay friends hanging out.
1993	Out There	Comedy Central	Lea DeLaria, Mark Davis, David Drake, Melissa Etheridge, Steve Moore, Marga Gomez, Ian McKellen, Kathy Najimy, Phranc, Suzanne Westenhoefer, Bob Smith, Pomo Afro Homos	American television's first-ever all-LGBT comedy special, broadcast in conjunction with National Coming Out Day.
1993–present	This Hour Has 22 Minutes	CBC	Rick Mercer, Gavin Crawford, Brandon Ash-Mohammed	
1994	Out There 2	Comedy Central	Amanda Bearse, John McGivern, Kate Clinton, Mark Davis, Lea DeLaria, Elvira Kurt, Frank Maya, Scott Silverman	Sequel to the 1993 Out There.
1998	In Thru the Out Door	CBC, Showtime	Maggie Cassella, Jaffe Cohen, Elvira Kurt, Lea DeLaria, Bob Smith, Suzanne Westenhoefer, Jonathan Wilson	Sketch comedy special.
1998	We're Funny That Way!	Bravo Canada, OUTtv	Steve Moore, Christopher Peterson, Scott Capurro, Maggie Cassella, Kate Clinton, Jaffe Cohen, Lea DeLaria, Elvira Kurt, Bob Smith, John McGivern, The Nellie Olesons, Kate Rigg, Dina Martina, Trevor Boris	Documentary special (1998) and series (2007) about the We're Funny That Way! comedy festival in Toronto, featuring both interviews and stand-up comedy performances.
2000-2003	The Gavin Crawford Show	The Comedy Network	Gavin Crawford	
2001	This Sitcom Is...Not to Be Repeated	The Comedy Network	Ed Sahely, Jonathan Wilson	
2004	Out on the Edge	Comedy Central	Alan Cumming (host)	Comedy/variety special featuring gay and lesbian comedians and musicians.
2004–present	Rick Mercer Report	CBC	Rick Mercer	
2005–2009	The House of Venus Show	OUTtv, here!, Pink TV	Mark Kenneth Woods, Michael Venus, Dickey Doo, Cotton	Gay-themed sketch comedy show.
2005–2007	Wisecrack	Logo	Page Hurwitz, Alec Mapa, Judy Gold, Miss Coco Peru, Cashetta, Vickie Shaw, Doug Holsclaw	Stand-up comedy series featuring LGBT comics.
2006	I've Got a Secret	GSN	Billy Bean, Frank DeCaro, Jermaine Taylor, Suzanne Westenhoefer	Revival of the classic game show with, coincidentally or not, an all-gay panel.
2007–2010	The Big Gay Sketch Show	Logo	Julie Goldman (Season 1–3), Stephen Guarino (Seasons 1–3), Colman Domingo (Seasons 2–3), Jonny McGovern (Seasons 1–3), Kate McKinnon (Seasons 1–3), Michael Serrato (Season 1), Paolo Andino (Seasons 2–3), Nicol Paone (Seasons 1–3)	Gay-themed comedy sketch show produced by Rosie O'Donnell and directed by Amanda Bearse.
2009–2010	Jeffery & Cole Casserole	Logo	Jeffery Self, Cole Escola	Sketch comedy series that originated in a series of YouTube videos.
2012–	She's Living for This	here!	Sherry Vine	
2016–2021	Baroness von Sketch Show	CBC Television	Carolyn Taylor	
2017–	The Trixie & Katya Show	Viceland	Trixie Mattel, Katya Zamolodchikova	
2019–	The Read with Kid Fury and Crissle West	Fuse	Kid Fury, Crissle West	
2022–	Pillow Talk	Crave	Paolo Santalucia, Gregory Prest, Nicola Correia-Damude	
