= Out There (Comedy Central) =

Two America television comedy specials (1993 and 1994)

Out There is a series of two television comedy specials broadcast by Comedy Central in 1993 and 1994. The specials centred on performances by openly LGBT and/or gay-friendly comedians, primarily stand-up comedy but also including some sketch comedy.

The first special, hosted by Lea DeLaria, aired in December 1993 following its recording in October on National Coming Out Day. Performers appearing in the special included David Drake, Mark Davis, Bob Smith, Melissa Etheridge, Marga Gomez, Ian McKellen, Steve Moore, Kathy Najimy, Phranc, Suzanne Westenhoefer, Bea Arthur and Pomo Afro Homos.

The second special, hosted by Amanda Bearse, aired in 1994 on National Coming Out Day, with performers including DeLaria, Davis, John McGivern, Kate Clinton, Elvira Kurt, Frank Maya, Scott Silverman and Cybill Shepherd.
