= Michael Wallent =

Michael Wallent (born February 1969) is an executive at Microsoft. Wallent joined Microsoft on August 11, 1996. He subsequently worked on DHTML and Internet Explorer versions 4 through 6, serving as general manager for versions 5.5 and 6. Wallent then became general manager of the Windows Client Platform Team, where he led the teams responsible for Windows Presentation Foundation and Silverlight. Wallent also was the General Manager of the Windows Manageability team, which includes products such as PowerShell and Windows Management Instrumentation. As of October 2018, Wallent works as a corporate vice president for Microsoft.

In 2007, Wallent came out as a transgender woman, taking the name Megan. Wallent announced the gender transition to all 100 of his employees at the time via an email with the subject line "Re: Me". Wallent also discussed his transition openly on his personal blog. He took a leave of absence from Microsoft starting on November 21, 2007, to undergo medical procedures related to transitioning, returning subsequently under his new name. The company touted its financial support for Wallent's medical needs. Wallent joined the board of Out & Equal in 2010.

In March 2013, Wallent announced that, due to medical complications with hormones, he would be transitioning back to living as a man and reassuming the name "Michael".
