= Because I Said So =

Because I Said So may refer to:

- Because I Said So (film), a 2007 film starring Mandy Moore and Diane Keaton
- Because I Said So (TV series), a 2002 talk show
