= Play It Cool =

Play It Cool may refer to:

- Play It Cool (film), a 1962 British musical starring Billy Fury
- "Play It Cool" (song), by Super Furry Animals
- Play It Cool (Wilber Pan album), 2007
- Play It Cool (Lea DeLaria album), 2001
- "Play It Cool", a song by 7L & Esoteric from The Soul Purpose
- "Play It Cool", a song by George Jones from Grand Ole Opry's New Star
- "Play It Cool", a song by Grand Puba from 2000
- "Play It Cool", a song by Münchener Freiheit (band)
- "Play It Cool", a song by Ray Campi
- "Play It Cool", a song by Gangrene featuring Samuel T. Herring and Earl Sweatshirt from Welcome to Los Santos
