= Outie (disambiguation) =

An outie is a convex navel.

Outie may also refer to:

- The Outies, an awards gala for LGBT individuals in the workplace
- Outie, a colloquial name for a kind of vulva
- Outie, a kind of cell in killer sudoku
- Outie, an employee's consciousness outside of work on the TV series Severance

== See also ==
- Out (disambiguation)
