= Lea DeLaria =

American comedian, actress and singer (born 1958)

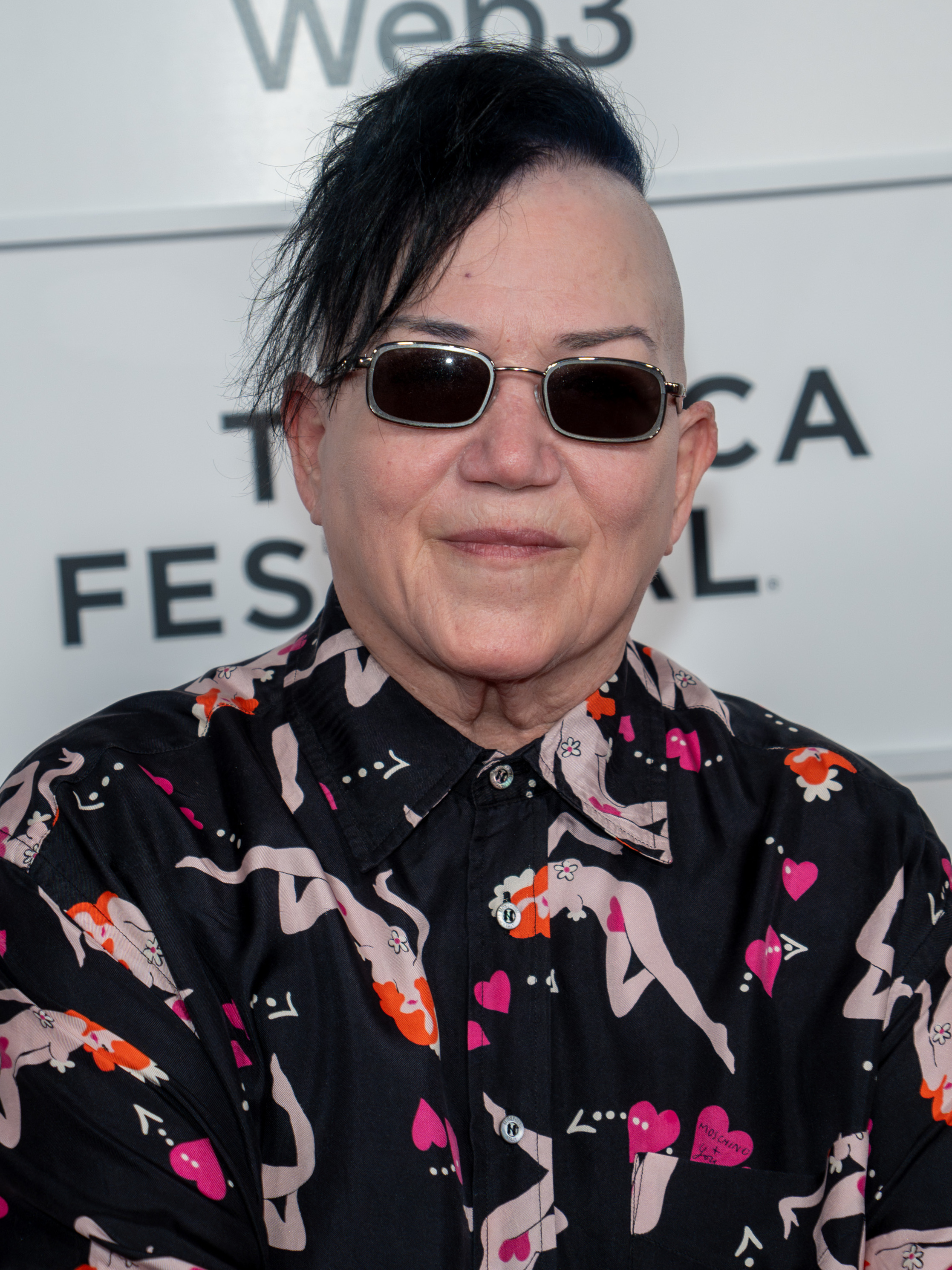
- DeLaria at the 2025 Tribeca Festival
- Born: May 23, 1958 (age 68); Belleville, Illinois, U.S.
- Spouse: Dalia Gladstone

Comedy career
- Years active: 1982–present
- Medium: Stand-up, television, film, music
- Genres: Observational comedy; satire
- Subjects: LGBTQ culture; everyday life; pop culture; human sexuality; current events
- Website: leadelaria.com

Lea DeLaria (born May 23, 1958) is an American comedian, actress, and jazz singer. She portrayed Carrie "Big Boo" Black on the Netflix original series Orange Is the New Black (2013–2019) and Psychic Madame Delphina on the ABC daytime drama One Life to Live from 1999 to 2011. She also starred in the Broadway productions POTUS: Or, Behind Every Great Dumbass Are Seven Women Trying to Keep Him Alive in 2022 and the 2000 revival of The Rocky Horror Show. In 2006, she played the role of Nick Bottom in A Midsummer Night’s Dream, gaining good reviews. She was the first openly gay comic to appear on American television in a 1993 appearance on The Arsenio Hall Show.

== Early life ==
DeLaria was born in Belleville, Illinois, the daughter of Jerry Jean (née Cox), a homemaker, and Robert George DeLaria, a jazz pianist and social worker. Her paternal grandparents were Italian. She attended kindergarten through eighth grade at St. Mary's Elementary School in Belleville and has referenced her Catholic upbringing in her performances.

== Career ==
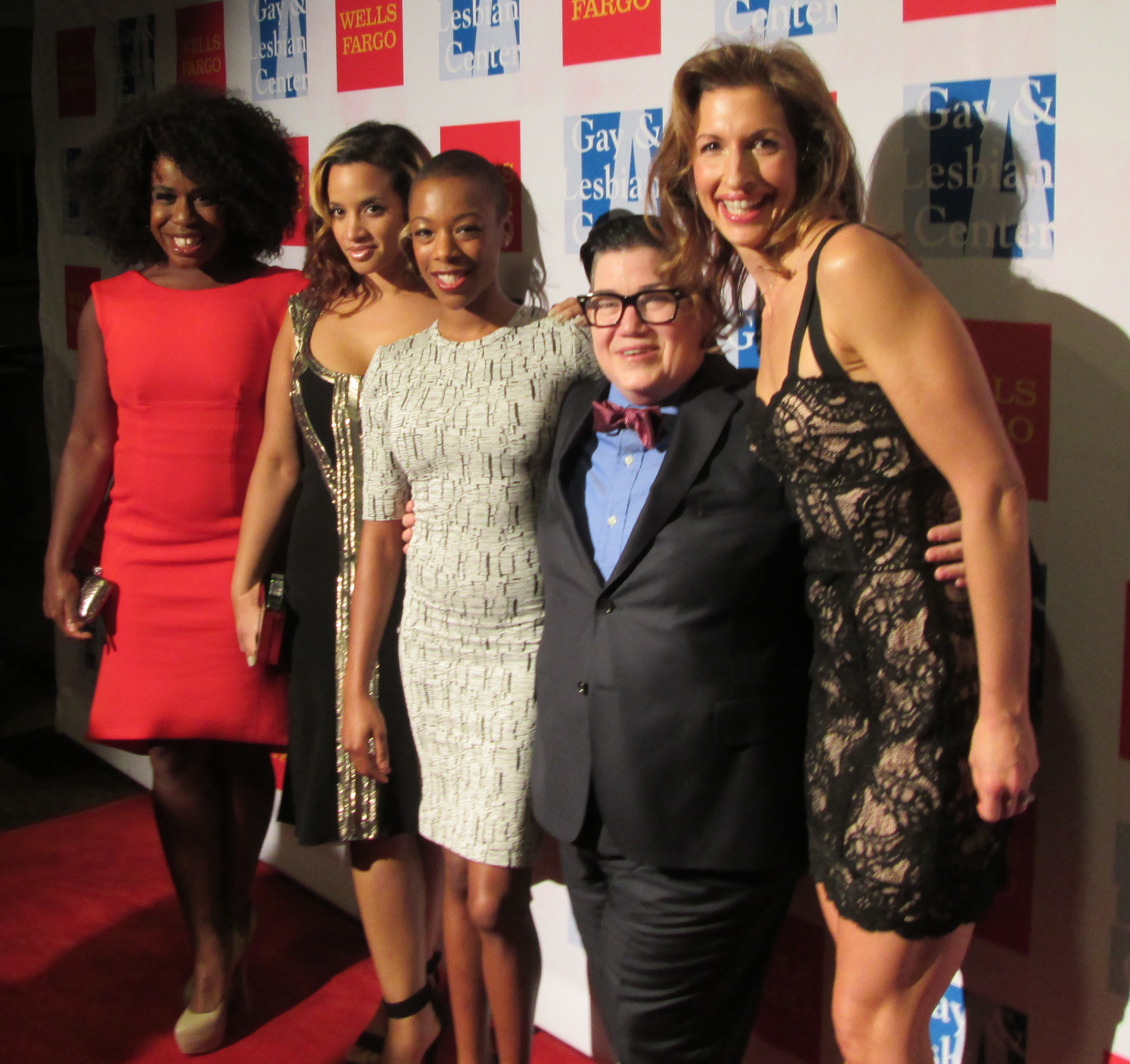
From left to right: Uzo Aduba, Dascha Polanco, Samira Wiley, DeLaria, and Alysia Reiner from Orange Is the New Black in 2015

DeLaria's stand-up career began in 1982 when she moved to San Francisco and performed raunchy stand-up comedy in the Mission District. Discussing her stand-up, Delaria says, "This is who I am, when I'm up there. This is it. I'm a big butch dyke. That's who I am. And I'm a friendly one. I'm a big butch dyke with a smile on my face."

In 1986, DeLaria directed Ten Percent Revue, a musical revue written by Tom Wilson Weinberg that celebrates gay and lesbian culture. Ten Percent Revue was performed in Boston, San Francisco, Provincetown, Philadelphia, and Atlanta. Many shows were sold out.

From 1987 to 1989, DeLaria starred in Dos Lesbos, a musical comedy about two lesbians dealing with the issues of living together. The show received very favorable reviews nationwide.

DeLaria conceived, wrote, directed and starred in Girl Friday: We're Funny That Way, a musical comedy, in 1989. The show won the 1989 Golden Gull for Best Comedy Group in Provincetown, Massachusetts.

When DeLaria appeared on The Arsenio Hall Show in 1993, she was the first openly gay comic to appear on a late-night talk show. While appearing on the show, DeLaria said, "Hello everybody, my name is Lea DeLaria, and it's great to be here, because it's the 1990s! It's hip to be queer! I'm a big dyke." DeLaria later said she had been told that she should not have used the term dyke on the air. Hall later defended her, saying, "If she wants to call herself a dyke, that's her business."

In December 1993, DeLaria hosted Comedy Central's Out There, the first all-gay stand-up comedy special.

DeLaria has released two CD recordings of her comedy, Bulldyke in a China Shop (1994) and Box Lunch (1997). She has also written a humorous book entitled Lea's Book of Rules for the World.

DeLaria appeared as Jane in the 1998 Off Broadway production of Paul Rudnick's The Most Fabulous Story Ever Told, "a gay retelling of the Bible." Entertainment Weekly said "a star is born with Lea DeLaria" of her "showstopping" performance as Hildy Esterhazy in the 1998 Broadway revival of On the Town.

DeLaria subsequently played Eddie and Dr. Scott in the 2000 Broadway revival of The Rocky Horror Show, and can be heard on the cast recording. DeLaria appeared in a number of films, including Edge of Seventeen and The First Wives Club.

DeLaria integrates musical performance into her stand-up comedy, focusing on traditional and modern be-bop jazz. In 2001 she released a CD of jazz standards called Play It Cool. This was followed by the album Double Standards in 2003, and by The Very Best of Lea DeLaria in 2008.

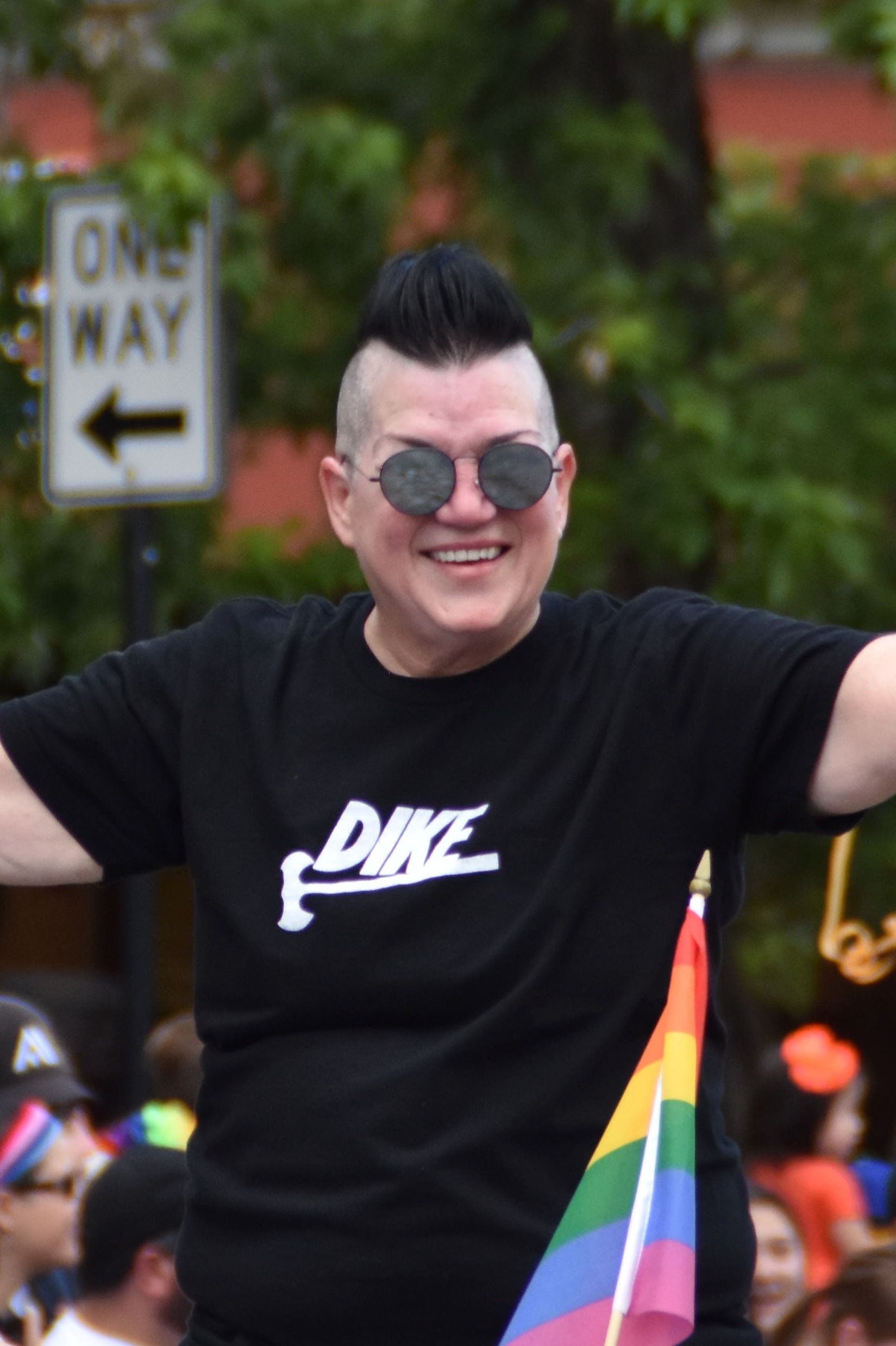
DeLaria in 2017

In 2001, DeLaria was the voice of Helga Phugly on the short-lived animated sitcom The Oblongs. In 1996 DeLaria played the part of a woman friend of Carol and Susan in the Friends episode The One with the Lesbian Wedding. In 1999 DeLaria played the recurring role of Madame Delphina on the ABC soap opera One Life to Live, returning in 2008 as both Delphina and Professor Delbert Fina. She continued to portray Delphina on a recurring basis until 2011.

In 2008, Warner Records released The Live Smoke Sessions, DeLaria's first recording focused on "timeless pop standards" such as "Down With Love", "Night and Day", "Love Me or Leave Me" and "Come Rain or Come Shine." She noted, "I styled this CD on the old school live recordings ... It is my hope that this CD will take you back to 1948 and the Village Vanguard. So please let me invite you to mix a cocktail and enjoy a smoke while you sit back and soak up the swing."

In November 2008, DeLaria completed a tour of Australia, playing Sydney, Melbourne, Adelaide and Brisbane. She also frequently collaborates with comedian Maggie Cassella, most notably on an annual Christmas cabaret show in Toronto which also sometimes tours to several other North American cities. In July 2010, her version of "All That Jazz" was used on So You Think You Can Dance. DeLaria performed in Prometheus Bound at the American Repertory Theater in Cambridge, Massachusetts. Since 2013, she has appeared in the Netflix Original Orange Is the New Black as the recurring character prison inmate Carrie 'Big Boo' Black.

In December 2014, DeLaria voiced EJ Randell, the lesbian mother of Jeff in the Cartoon Network animated series Clarence.

On February 14, 2015, DeLaria received the Equality Illinois Freedom Award for her work as "a cutting-edge performer who has used her talent to entertain and enlighten millions of Americans," said Bernard Cherkasov, CEO of Equality Illinois. On receiving the award at the 2015 Equality Illinois Gala in Chicago, DeLaria said, "As an out performer for over 33 years who has made it her life's work to change peoples perception of butch, queer and LGBT, it is an honor for me to receive such recognition from my home state. I feel I'm doing Belleville proud. Go Maroons!".

In 2021, DeLaria starred in Wes Hurley's autobiographical dramedy Potato Dreams of America earning rave reviews, praise from John Waters and the Outstanding Supporting Performance Award from Tallgrass Film Festival.

In 2022, DeLaria returned to Broadway in the comic play POTUS: Or, Behind Every Great Dumbass Are Seven Women Trying to Keep Him Alive where she received positive acclaim from critics.

== The U-Haul Joke ==
DeLaria is the originator of the U-Haul Joke (see also U-Haul lesbian) which she began performing at comedy shows in 1989.

Question: "What does a lesbian bring on a second date?"
Answer: "A U-Haul."

She performs the joke on her album Box Lunch (1997).

== Personal life ==
In January 2015, DeLaria became engaged to fashion editor Chelsea Fairless after two and a half years of dating. The two met through Fairless's friend, actress Emma Myles, who plays Leanne in Orange is the New Black. In January 2017, DeLaria confirmed she and Fairless had separated.

After four and a half years of dating, DeLaria married Dalia Gladstone on November 22, 2025, in a ceremony held at The Players, a historic private social club in New York City.

== Discography ==
=== Comedy albums ===
- 1992: Bulldyke in a Chinashop
- 1997: Box Lunch (Rising Star)

=== Jazz albums ===
- 2001: Play It Cool (Warner/WEA)
- 2005: Double Standards (Telarc)
- 2006: The Very Best of Lea DeLaria (Rhino/WEA UK)
- 2008: Lea DeLaria – The Live Smoke Sessions (Ghostlight Records)
- 2015: House of David (Ghostlight Records)

=== Guest vocalist ===
- 2005: Din and Tonic – Janette Mason (Fireball Records)
- 2006: Drawn to All Things – Ian Shaw Sings the Songs of Joni Mitchell – Ian Shaw (Linn Records)
- 2009: Alien Left Hand – Janette Mason (Fireball Records)

=== Theatre and film ===
- 1998: On the Town – Broadway Revival Cast
- 1999: Edge of Seventeen – Music from the Motion Picture Soundtrack – Blue Skies (Razor and Tie)
- 2001: The Rocky Horror Show – 2000 Broadway Revival Cast (RCA Victor Broadway)
- 2005: Hair – Actors' Fund of America Benefit Recording (Ghostlight)
- 2017: Cars 3 – "Freeway of Love"

== Filmography ==
=== Film ===
Year	Title	Role	Notes
1996	Rescuing Desire	Sadie	
1996	The First Wives Club	Elise's fan	National Board of Review Award: Best Acting by an Ensemble
1997	Plump Fiction	Mr. Purple	
1998	Homo Heights	Clementine	
1998	Edge of Seventeen	Angie	
2006	Fat Rose and Squeaky	Fat Rose	Co-starring Cicely Tyson as "Squeaky"
2013	Ass Backwards	Deb	
2016	Bear with Us	Chief Ranger Stewart (voice)	
2017	Cars 3	Miss Fritter (voice)	
2018	Support the Girls	Bobo	
2020	Ahead of the Curve	Herself	Documentary
2021	Potato Dreams of America	Tamara	
2025	Tow	Jocelyn	
2025	Outerlands	Denise	
TBA	C-Side	TBA	Filming
TBA	Stephanie, Bride to Be	TBA	Filming

=== Television ===
Year	Title	Role	Notes
1993	Out There	Herself	TV film
1993	Camp Christmas	Herself	TV film
1993	In the Life	Herself/Guest host	1 episode
1994	Matlock	Det. Pat Jordan	2 episodes
1994–95	The John Larroquette Show	Lorelei	2 episodes
1995	Tom Clancy's Op Center	Capt. White	TV film
1995	Saved by the Bell: The New Class	Miss Hearst	Episode: "Ryan's Worst Nightmare"
1995	Out There in Hollywood	Herself	Sequel to the 1993 TV movie Out There
1996	Friends	Woman	Episode: "The One with the Lesbian Wedding"
1997	The Drew Carey Show	Jewel	Episode: "Drewstock"
1998	In Thru the Out Door	Various characters (also writer)	TV film
1998	We're Funny That Way!	Herself	Documentary
1999	Great Performances	Herself/Performer	TV series
1999–2011	One Life to Live	Madame Delphina	31 episodes
2000	The Beat	Kathy	Unknown episodes
2001	Further Tales of the City	Willie Omiak	TV mini-series
2001	The Oblongs	Helga Phugly, Grammy Oblong (voices)	Recurring role
2001	Cabaret Live!	Herself/Performer	
2002	The Job	Kiki	Episode: "Gina"
2002	Just for Laughs	Herself/Performer	TV movie
2003	Will & Grace	Nurse Carver	Episode: "Swimming from Cambodia"
2003	The Award Show Awards Show	Herself	TV special
2004	Mercury in Retrograde	Betsy Brick	TV short
2006	Outlaugh!	Herself/Performer	TV special
2009	Ptown Diaries	DeLaria	TV movie
2009	Law & Order: Special Victims Unit	Frankie	Episode: "Transitions"
2012	Californication	Debbie	Episode: "Raw"
2012	Submissions Only	Auditioner #4	Episode: "Another Interruption"
2013	Dear Dumb Diary	Ms. Bruntford	TV film
2013–2019	Orange Is the New Black	Carrie "Big Boo" Black	Recurring season 1–3, regular season 4–5, guest season 6-7 (63 episodes)
2014	Awkward	Tattooist	Episode: "After Hours"
2014–2017	Clarence	EJ / various characters (voice)	9 episodes
2014	Tellement Gay! Homosexualité et pop culture	Herself	Documentary
2015	The Jim Gaffigan Show	Herself	Episode: "The Bible Story"
2017	Broad City	Deb	Episode: "Bedbugs"
2017	Shameless	Barb	Episode: "Frank's Northern Southern Express"
2017–2018	Baroness von Sketch Show	Brina / Butch Shaman	2 episodes
2019	The Code	Marti Dimonte	Episode: "1st Civ Div"
2019	Reprisal	Queenie	9 episodes
2020	Close Enough	(voice)	Episode: "Prank War/Cool Moms"
2020	Kipo and the Age of Wonderbeasts	Molly Yarnchopper (voice)	5 episodes
2021	Physical	Professor Mendelson	Episode: "Let's Get Political"
2022	The Blacklist	Nurse Binstock	Episode: "Eva Mason (No. 181)"
2023	East New York	Fire Marshal Nicky Greenville	Episode: "We Didn't Start the Fire"
2023	Awkwafina Is Nora from Queens	Alfur the Elf	2 episodes
2024	Girls5eva	Bev	Episode: "New York"

=== Theatre ===
Year	Title	Role	Venue	Ref.
1998	On the Town	Hildy Esterhazy	Gershwin Theatre, Broadway	
2000	The Rocky Horror Show	Eddie/Dr. Everett V. Scott	Circle in the Square, Broadway	
2005	Alley Cats: The Musical	Hilda Heckarott	Vogue Theatre, Vancouver	
2017	Mamma Mia!	Rosie	Hollywood Bowl, Los Angeles	
2022	POTUS: Or, Behind Every Great Dumbass Are Seven Women Trying to Keep Him Alive	Bernadette	Shubert Theatre, Broadway	
2024	The Night of the Iguana	Judith Fellowes	Pershing Square, Off-Broadway	

=== Video games ===
Year	Title	Role	Notes
2017	Cars 3: Driven to Win	Miss Fritter	Voice

=== Podcasts ===
Year	Title	Role
2015	Theater People	Guest
2017	The Naked American Songbook	Guest
2017	Vulture Fest Live: Lea DeLaria	Guest
2018	Ways to Change the World	Guest
2018	Woman's Hour	Guest
2019	The Horrors of Dolores Roach	Cleats
2021	Marvel's Wastelanders: Hawkeye	Raven/Mystique
2025	Lea DeLaria Paved The Way	Guest

== Awards and nominations ==
Year	Award	Category	Work	Result
1998	Drama Desk Award	Outstanding Featured Actress in a Musical	On The Town	Nominated
1998	Obie Awards		On The Town	Won
1998	Theatre World Award			Won
2014	Screen Actors Guild Award	Outstanding Performance by an Ensemble in a Comedy Series	Orange Is the New Black	Won
2015	Screen Actors Guild Award	Outstanding Performance by an Ensemble in a Comedy Series	Orange Is the New Black	Won
2016	Screen Actors Guild Award	Outstanding Performance by an Ensemble in a Comedy Series	Orange Is the New Black	Won
2017	Screen Actors Guild Award	Outstanding Performance by an Ensemble in a Comedy Series	Orange Is the New Black	Nominated
2021	Tallgrass Film Festival	Outstanding Supporting Performance	Potato Dreams of America	Won
