= My Fabulous Gay Wedding =

- Also known as: First Comes Love
- Genre: Reality television
- Presented by: Scott Thompson; Elvira Kurt
- Country of origin: Canada
- No. of seasons: 2
- No. of episodes: 19

Production
- Executive producer: David Paperny
- Producer: Trevor Hodgson
- Cinematography: Geoff Lackner
- Running time: 6 x 30 min, 13 x 60 min
- Production company: Paperny Entertainment

Original release
- Network: Global

My Fabulous Gay Wedding is a Canadian reality television show hosted by comedian Scott Thompson in the first season and Elvira Kurt in the second. The series airs on the Global Television Network. It was broadcast in the U.S. as First Comes Love, on Logo TV.

In the first season, the show features a same-sex couple that plans to marry; the arrangements for the wedding are prepared, on two weeks' notice, by a team of wedding planners who are both heterosexual and homosexual. As with typical, Western heterosexual weddings, the general idea is to create a unique experience that reflects the personality of the people to be wed, while adding a special gay sensibility. The spirit of the program is one of fun.

In the second season, with new host Elvira Kurt, the stories concentrate more on the couples than the wedding planning process. The team of wedding planners has been reduced to one: Fern Cohen. This season debuted on Logo in February 2007.

Through interviews with the family members, the show also explores the issue of same-sex marriage and its effect on the social fabric.
