= Cache Craze =

- Country of origin: Canada
- Original language: English
- No. of seasons: 2
- No. of episodes: 34

Production
- Executive producers: Vince Commisso; Steven Jarosz; Kate Rigg
- Running time: 45 minutes (season 1); 22 minutes (season 2)
- Production company: 9 Story Entertainment

Original release
- Network: YTV
- Release: March 9, 2013 – August 20, 2014

Cache Craze is a Canadian reality competition television show featuring mental and physical challenges, such as hiking or swimming, and is inspired by geocaching. The show is hosted by Canadian actor, amateur and professional comedian Ryan Horwood.

The show first aired on YTV on March 9, 2013.

== Format ==
The main objective of this fast-paced reality competition is to obtain the caches with the help of GPS technology. Every week, family teams led by a teenager explore mazes and complete a series of other mental and physical challenges while collecting points from finding and taking hidden geocaches. The final remaining will go home with a $10,000 cash prize, other prizes and "The Amazing Amaze Ball!".

== Filming ==
The show was filmed in multiple locations in Southern Ontario, including downtown Toronto, Horseshoe Valley, and Niagara falls.
