= Out & Equal =

American LGBT advocacy group

Out & Equal Workplace Advocates
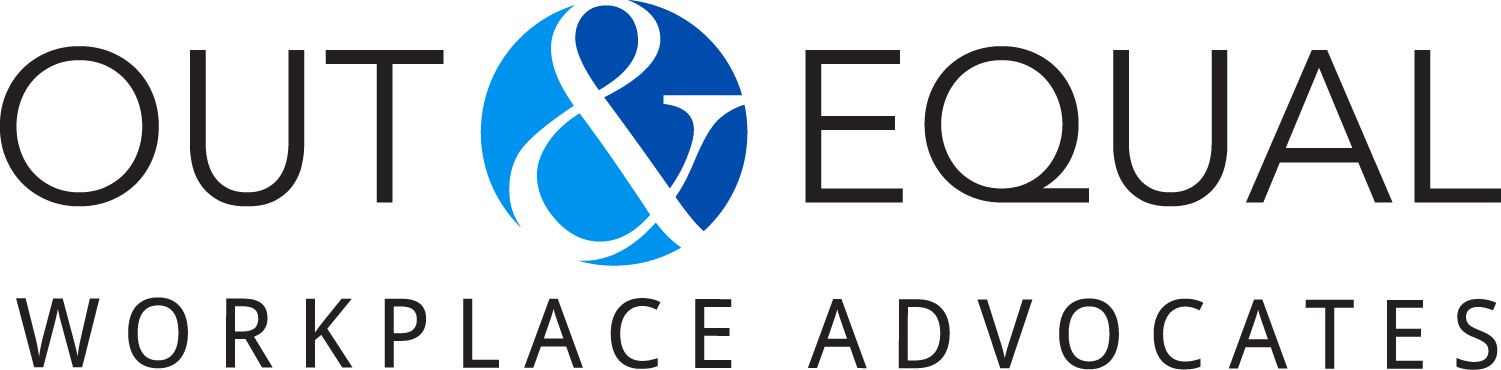
- Founded: 1996
- Founder: Selisse Berry
- Type: Nonprofit Advocacy Organization
- Purpose: LGBTQ workplace discrimination
- Location: Oakland, California, United States
- Method: Training, advocacy and programs
- Key people: Erin Uritus (CEO)
- Website: outandequal.org

Out & Equal Workplace Advocates (commonly known as "Out & Equal") is a United States lesbian, gay, bisexual and transgender (LGBTQ) workplace equality nonprofit organization headquartered in Oakland, California.

Out & Equal describes its organizational vision as, "To achieve workplace equality for all regardless of sexual orientation, gender identity, expression, or characteristics." Out & Equal provides training and resources to LGBT employees and corporations alike through advocacy, training programs and events. It is led by Erin Uritus, an openly bi+ CEO.

Out & Equal achieved 501(c)(3) status in 2004.

== Mission and vision ==
Out & Equal is "the global convener, thought leader, and catalyst actively working to achieve workplaces of equality and belonging -- supporting LGBT+ employees and leaders who thrive in their careers and lives, and achieve greater impact on the world."

Its vision is "Global workplaces where all people are equal, belong, and thrive."

== History ==
Out & Equal's founder, Selisse Berry, was hired in December 1996 by the United Way of the Bay Area as director of the Building Bridges training program. The Building Bridges program developed partnerships with fellow LGBT organizations around the Bay Area. Berry ran the program and built coalitions as a single-person staff working out of the Pacific Center in Berkeley, California, and by September 1997 she moved into the United Way Bay Area (UWBA) offices in San Francisco.

Out & Equal at San Francisco Pride 2010.

By 1998, three LGBT workplace organizations merged in an effort to effectively collaborate on their common mission of creating safe and affirming workplaces for LGBT individuals—called the Pride Collaborative. These organizations included Building Bridges, A Group of Groups (AGOG), and Progress.

In 1999 The Pride Collaborative merged with COLLEAGUES, a national organization that sponsored the annual Out & Equal Conference aimed at human resource professionals and LGBT employees, to form Out & Equal Workplace Advocates, and the current organizational structure was born. That same year, Progress's Leadership Summit and COLLEAGUES' Out & Equal Conference combined resources to produce the annual Out & Equal Workplace Summit, one of the keystone programs of the organization.

In January 2004, after years of being supported by the United Way of the Bay Area, Out & Equal Workplace Advocates became an independent 501(c)(3) organization. Until December 2019, Out & Equal was headquartered in the historic City Club building in San Francisco's Financial District, when it moved to Oakland. In 2015, Out & Equal opened a second office in Washington, DC, which it began to expand on its bi-coastal presence.

In 2018, Founder and CEO Selisse Berry was succeeded by Erin Uritus, who served as an Out & Equal board member from 2005-2007. Uritus presided over a comprehensive re-positioning of Out & Equal's strategic plan; new service delivery and sponsorship model; expansion and diversification of its major Summit event; launch of new services and programs like the digital Global Hub, Southern Forum; the expansion of global programs in India, China and Brazil; and the launch of a new organizational brand.

== Programs ==
=== Workplace Summit ===
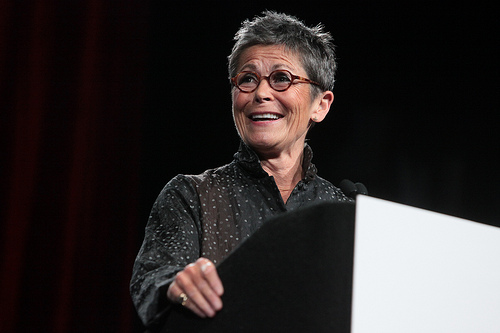
Kate Clinton hosts The Outies

Out & Equal annually holds an annual event called the Out & Equal Workplace Summit in rotating locations around the United States. The Workplace Summit hosts thousands of LGBT employees, human resource professionals and organizational representatives each year for a few days of training and networking. It is the world's largest conference on LGBTQ issues with more than 6,000 attendees in 2019. The Workplace Summit includes an award ceremony aimed at recognizing leaders in LGBT workplace equality called The Outies.

Out & Equal's Workplace Summit is considered to be appropriate for federal training in compliance with 5 U.S.C. Chapter 41. As proclaimed by Human Resources Director John Berry on August 6, 2010, the Out & Equal Workplace Summit is open to all federal employees.

Year	Workplace Summit Location
1999	Atlanta, GA
2000	Seattle, WA
2001	Northern KY
2002	Orlando, FL
2003	Minneapolis, MN
2004	Tempe, AZ
2005	Denver, CO
2006	Chicago, IL
2007	Washington, DC
2008	Austin, TX
2009	Orlando, FL
2010	Los Angeles, CA
2011	Dallas Fort Worth, TX
2012	Baltimore, MD
2013	Minneapolis, MN
2014	San Francisco, CA
2015	Dallas, TX
2016	Orlando, FL
2017	Philadelphia, PA
2018	Seattle, WA
2019	Washington, DC
2020	Virtual
2021	Virtual
2022	Las Vegas, NV
2023	Orlando, FL
2024	Virtual (after Hurricane Milton forced cancellation of the in-person event)

=== Global LGBTQ+ Events ===
In 2012, Out & Equal held their first international Summit in London. This dynamic event brought together people from around the world to consider ways to build greater equality in the workplace for LGBT people and allies. Attendees came together to share best practices, engage with colleagues from around the world, and strengthen the diversity of global workplaces. Tennis champion Martina Navratilova, IBM Europe Chairman Harry van Dorenmalen, and organizational consultant John Amaechi were among the speakers at the Global LGBT Workplace Summit. The conference featured 24 workshops covering a broad range of topics focused on LGBT workplace issues around the world.

Out & Equal in Dallas, TX

Out & Equal also hosts events in Brazil, India, and China.

=== Executive Forum ===
The Executive Forum is an annual meeting of executive leaders in a multi-day conference to "learn from one another and share best practices." The first Executive Forum was held in 2008 in San Francisco but have been held in countries all over the US.

=== Momentum Gala ===
The Momentum Gala is Out & Equal's annual celebration and gala dinner held in San Francisco which honors prominent activists in the LGBT movement, organizations dedicated to diversity and inclusion in their workplace, and features LGBT entertainers and inspirational speakers.

=== Training ===
Out & Equal offers diversity training, educational resources and consulting services to senior management, human resource professionals, employee resource groups and individual employees to promote LGBT workplace equality. Out & Equal training programs include "Train the Trainer", "Building Bridges", "LGBT Diversity Training", and "Transgender Intensive".

The Out & Equal Town Call speaker series feature of monthly telephone conference calls with guest speakers discussing LGBT workplace topics. Each call includes a presentation followed by a question and answer session in a one-hour time frame. Town Calls are free for the public and are built to fit into a regular workday.

== Workplace policies ==
=== Title VII of the Civil Rights Act ===
Out & Equal mobilized hundreds of businesses to join an amicus brief to the Supreme Court in support of the proposition that businesses should not be allowed to discriminate on the basis of sexual orientation or gender identity.

=== ENDA ===
As a workplace equality advocacy organization, Out & Equal has publicly supported the passage of Employment Non-Discrimination Act (ENDA). Out & Equal has issued public statements urging constituents to contact their United States House Representatives to proceed with the passage of ENDA. During San Francisco Pride Parades, Out & Equal has provided signage to parade participants displaying support for ENDA.

=== Marriage equality ===
Leading up the 2015 SCOTUS ruling in Obergefell v. Hodges that state-level bans on same-sex marriage are unconstitutional, Out & Equal Workplace Advocates was one of 379 employer organizations that signed on to an amicus curiae brief which urged the High Court to consider the burdens imposed on both employers and employees by a fractured legal landscape with no uniform rule on same-sex marriage.

Out & Equal's "Business Case for Marriage Equality" was penned in 2010 and remains a critical tenant of the organization's overall work.

=== Immigration ===
In light of national outcry for immigration reform, Out & Equal joined a coalition of LGBT organizations around the United States in a public statement to support the Uniting American Families Act (UAFA) which protects the rights of same-sex couples during the immigration process into the United States. In a partnership with organizations including The Council for Global Equality and Human Rights Watch, Out & Equal publicly stated that, "An estimated 17,000 young children are being raised by LGBT parents in binational families and those children face the very real possibility of losing a parent, or leaving the only country they have ever called home."

=== Other ===
In response to public backlash to Target Corporation's large political donation to anti-gay Republican politician Tom Emmer, Target Corporation publicly called upon the Corporation's continued financial sponsorship of Out & Equal's Workplace Summit. Target CEO Gregg Steinhafel emphasized Target's relationship with Out & Equal in order to demonstrate the company's commitment to LGBT Workplace equality.

Out & Equal at Workplace Summit.

Stanford University lists Out & Equal as the leading organization for LGBT graduates to turn to for job placement advice.

In 2010, Out & Equal launched a series of editorials called "Communities in Common" written by diverse members of the LGBT community in order to recognize and celebrate the roles of other communities within the struggle for equality.

== Awards and recognition ==
On October 8, 2010, Out & Equal was recognized by GLSEN for outstanding leadership in LGBT rights at the GLSEN Respect Awards in Los Angeles, California.

In 2016, Selisse Berry, Founder of Out & Equal, was presented the Bonham Centre Award from The Mark S. Bonham Centre for Sexual Diversity Studies, University of Toronto, for her contributions to the advancement and education of issues around sexual identification.

== Related organizations ==
Out & Equal partners with a variety of organizations to promote LGBT workplace equality. To date, some key partners include Gay & Lesbian Alliance Against Defamation, Gay, Lesbian & Straight Education Network, International Gay & Lesbian Chamber of Commerce, Human Rights Campaign, Linkage, National Center for Lesbian Rights, National Gay & Lesbian Task Force, Out for Work, Parents, Families and Friends of Lesbians and Gays, Council for Global Equality, United ENDA, ENDA Now, NCTE, Immigration Equality and ReachOutUSA.

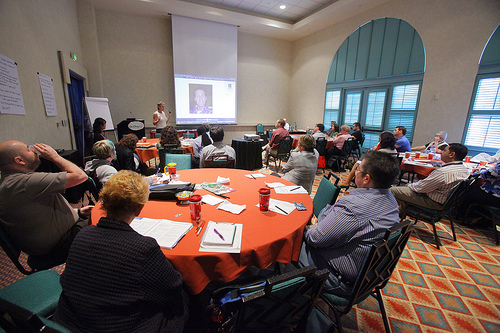
Workplace Summit Attendees.

Out & Equal also partners with gay media organizations including Diversity Inc.

== Publications ==
In 2013, Out & Equal published its second book, Out & Equal at Work: From Closet to Corner Office. Out & Equal at Work is an anthology of personal narratives from LGBT executives and straight ally workplace leaders who have ushered in policies that affirm and support the LGBT community in their workplaces.

== See also ==
- LGBT rights in the United States
- List of LGBT rights organizations
