= Marga Gomez =

American dramatist

- Born: June 19, 1960 (age 66); Harlem, New York
- Parent(s): Willy Chevalier and Margarita Estremera

Comedy career
- Years active: 1979 - Present
- Medium: Stand-up, theater
- Genres: Alt-comedy, Observational comedy, Topical humor
- Subjects: Feminism, LGBTQ, Latina/o community, Social Commentary, Pop Culture
- Website: http://www.margagomez.com

Marga Gomez is a comedian, writer, performer, and teaching artist from Harlem, New York. She has written and performed in thirteen solo plays which have been presented nationally and internationally. Her acting credits include Off-Broadway and national productions of The Vagina Monologues with Rita Moreno. She also acted in season two of the Netflix series Sense8. At the start of the coronavirus pandemic, Gomez pivoted to adapting and presenting her work for live streaming. She has been featured in online theater festivals from New York to San Diego, as well as a five-week virtual run for Brava, SF where she is an artist-in-residence. She is a GLAAD media award winner and recipient of the 2020 CCI Investing in Artists grant.

Gomez has been called “one of the countries first out lesbians in comedy.” She began performing stand-up in the early 1990s, using her life experiences in monologues to perform on stage. She has created and performed a variety of solo shows inspired by her upbringing and family life.

== Early life ==
Gomez was born and raised in New York where she lived on 169th street. She is of Puerto Rican/Cuban-American ancestry. Her father, Willy Chevalier, was a comedian from Cuba, while her mother, Margarita Estremera, was an exotic dancer from Puerto Rico.

She attended a Catholic school for five years, then transferred to a public school, where she excelled in creative writing and humanities.

Gomez grew up in Harlem in the midst of the Latino entertainment scene of the 1960s. She later credited her parents for inspiring her unique comedic voice. Her parents' careers in entertainment influenced her desire to become an entertainer herself. She got her start in comedy, performing bits in her parents' variety shows before moving to San Francisco after college in 1979, at the age of 20 to pursue a creative career.

== Career ==
In San Francisco, she joined a variety of theater troupes. Among them were Lilith, a women’s theater ensemble which was founded in 1974 and produced many original plays until 1985. Gomez was also part of the San Francisco Mime Troupe and was a founding member of the Latino comedy group Culture Clash (performance troupe), which was founded May 5, 1984. She got her comedic start in the gay comedy clubs of San Francisco in the mid-1980s, including the Valencia Rose Cabaret.

Some of Gomez's numerous theater pieces include Latin Standards, Los Big Names, A Line Around The Block, Memory Tricks, Marga Gomez is Pretty, Witty & Gay, Jaywalker, The Twelve Days of Cochina, Marga Gomez's Intimate Details, Long Island Iced Latina, Not Getting Any Younger, Pound, and Lovebirds

Gomez's solo performances address multiple personal factors that contributed to her life in important ways. Her performances range often address her sexuality and draw from her experiences within the queer and Latin communities. Memory Tricks, Latin Standards and Marga Gomez is Pretty, Witty and Gay all speak towards these attributes, among many others.

Memory Tricks (1991) was her first solo performance, which explores her relationship with her mother and her mother's struggle with Alzheimer’s. Throughout this performance, Gomez speaks about the differences between gender roles and what is expected from women. Gomez contrasts the ideas of femininity with her own views of women within society. The performance ends with the subject of memory tricks and, how at the end of Gomez's mother's life, her memory was failing because of her Alzheimer’s. Marga has been produced Off-Broadway, nationally and internationally, and has appeared at San Francisco's Theatre Rhinoceros. In 2002, Marga co-wrote and co-starred with Carmelita Tropicana in Single Wet Female for a three-week sold-out engagement at New York's Performance Space 122 under the direction of David Schweizer. She has also joined the casts of The Vagina Monologues several times, sharing the stage with Rita Moreno, Jobeth Williams, Barbara Rush and others.

In 2015, Gomez presented her solo show, Pound at Dixon Place in New York City.

Along with her one-woman shows, Gomez has performed stand-up comedy in multiple venues across the United States. Throughout her different sets, she addresses her identity of being a Lesbian Latina who cannot speak Spanish, and the expectations people had of her because of it. She comments on these cultural expectations through stand-up sets. For example, she speaks about the L-Word, and how lesbians are represented within pop culture.

She tours nationally in concert, at universities, nightclubs, cruise ships, and political events. She has appeared on HBO's Comic Relief, Showtime's Latino Laugh Festival, Comedy Central's Out There and the PBS series In the Life. Marga's comedy recording, Hung Like a Fly, is available on Uproar Records. She is profiled in the 2003 award-winning documentary Laughing Matters along with Kate Clinton, Suzanne Westenhoefer and Karen Williams.

Gomez's film and television credits include HBO's Tracey Takes On..., Sphere, Batman Forever and Netflix's "Sense8: Christmas Special". She is featured in indie festival hits Rosa Negra, The D Word, Desi's Looking for a New Girl, and Fabulous.

== Personal life ==
Gomez is openly lesbian.

== Awards, nominations, and critical reception ==
In 2022 Gomez was awarded a United States Artists (USA) fellowship. Gomez won a GLAAD award for Off-Off Broadway theater in 2004. She received nominations in 2006 for the Drama Desk Award and New York Outer Critics Circle Award while performing at the 47th Street Theater. She was nominated for the NCLR Bravo award for outstanding performance by a female in a variety or music series in 1996. The late American actor and comedian Robin Williams said of Gomez, "Amazing, she's like a lesbian Lenny Bruce."

Selections from Gomez’s work have been published in several anthologies, including Extreme Exposure (TCG Books), HOWL (Crown Press), Out, Loud & Laughing (Anchor Books), Contemporary Plays by American Women of Color (Routledge), When I Knew (Harper-Collins) and Out of Character (Bantam Books). Gomez was one of eight playwrights to be commissioned by the Mark Taper Forum's Latino Theater Initiative as part of the 2005 Amor Eterno project. She is the recipient of Theater LA's 'Ovation Award' for her collaboration with Culture Clash at the Mark Taper Forum.
