= Spin Off (Canadian game show) =

Canadian game show television series

- Created by: Mark Burnett
- Presented by: Elvira Kurt
- Country of origin: Canada

Production
- Running time: 30 minutes
- Production companies: One Three Media; Suddenly SeeMore Productions

Original release
- Network: Syndicated via CHCH-DT
- Release: September 11, 2013 – 2014

Spin Off is a Canadian game show created and produced by Mark Burnett for CHCH-DT. The series is hosted by Canadian comedian Elvira Kurt and debuted on September 11, 2013. The show appeared to only have one season, and reruns air randomly on CHCH overnight and weekends.

== Gameplay ==
There is one contestant at a time, who answers questions in sequence while the results are displayed by changing the colours of wedges on a large wheel. The game consists of up to three numbered rounds followed by an Endgame round, unless the player is eliminated sooner. The player "banks" money for correct answers and the amount may be changed by a spin of the wheel at the end of each round. A player who is eliminated wins nothing.

=== Rounds 1, 2, and 3 ===
The wheel displays six wedges that all start as either red or green. Each correct answer changes one red wedge to green, or a green one to gold if there are no red wedges. An incorrect answer changes one green wedge to red, or eliminates the player if all six are already red. The wheel starts with one red wedge in Round 1, and one more is added for each subsequent round. Questions are worth $200 each in Round 1, $400 in Round 2, and $600 in Round 3.

A total of five questions are asked per round, or six if the entire wheel is the same colour after the fifth one. The wheel is then subdivided into 18 smaller wedges, maintaining the same proportions of the three colours, and the player takes one spin. If the wheel stops on red, the player is eliminated; a green wedge has no effect, while a gold one doubles the money banked in that round.

If either of the first two rounds ends without the player being eliminated, they may choose to proceed to the next round or play the Endgame immediately.

=== Endgame ===
The wheel again displays six wedges, one of which is initially green and marked with the total banked in Rounds 1 through 3. The other five are blank. The player answers five more questions; each correct answer allows them to press one of five green buttons, while each miss forces them to press one of five red ones. The green buttons correspond randomly to the outcomes ×1, ×2, ×3, ×4, and ×5; the red buttons correspond randomly to ÷2, ÷3, ÷4, and ÷5, and BUST. Each button press turns one blank wedge to its colour and marks it with the assigned value.

After answering the last question, the player spins the wheel once and wins the banked total for hitting it, nothing at all for hitting BUST, or the total multiplied/divided by the displayed number for hitting any other space.

The maximum potential winnings total is $60,000, obtained by answering five questions correctly in Rounds 1 through 3, spinning gold each time, finding the x5 wedge with a correct answer in the Endgame, and landing on it.
