= Suzanne Westenhoefer =

American comedian (born 1961)

- Born: March 31, 1961 (age 65); Columbia, Pennsylvania, U.S.

Comedy career
- Years active: 1993–present
- Medium: Stand-up comedy, film, television
- Genres: Observational comedy; satire
- Subjects: LGBTQ culture; everyday life; pop culture; human sexuality; current events
- Website: suzannew.com

Suzanne Westenhoefer (born March 31, 1961, in Columbia, Pennsylvania) is an American out lesbian stand-up comedian. She starred as a panelist on GSN's 2006 remake of I've Got a Secret, which featured a panel of gay celebrities who had to guess the various guests' 'secrets' through a series of timed questions. Her comedy special and documentary, A Bottom on Top, aired on LOGO Television in the fall of 2007. In 2004 she was featured in the film Laughing Matters along with Kate Clinton, Marga Gomez and Karen Williams.

After accepting a dare, she began her career delivering gay-themed material to straight audiences in mainstream comedy clubs in New York City in the early 1990s. She became the first openly lesbian comic ever to appear on television in 1991 on an episode of The Sally Jesse Raphael Show entitled "Breaking the Lesbian Stereotype...Lesbians Who Don't Look Like Lesbians." In 1991 and 1992, her stand-up comedy appeared on Comedy Central's Short Attention Span Theater and Stand-up Stand-up. She went on to become the first openly gay comic to host her own HBO Comedy Special in 1994 (which earned her a Cable Ace Award nomination) and to appear on the Late Show with David Letterman in 2003. Westenhoefer's current US tour is entitled "Totally Inappropriate". In 1993 she performed in the LGBT-themed comedy special Out There, and in 1998 she appeared in the LGBT-themed sketch comedy special In Thru the Out Door.

Westenhoefer's recent tour, "Finally legal… in a few states", was a headlining act on the recent Sweet Caribbean cruise. Her latest venture, a starring role in the popular online web drama We Have To Stop Now is about to enter its second season, with the first soon available on DVD from Wolfe Video. Her GLAMA award-winning specials Nothing in my Closet but my Clothes, I'm Not Cindy Brady and Guaranteed Fresh are all available on DVD, as are her most recent televised specials, Live from the Village and A Bottom on Top.

== Discography ==
- HBO Comedy Half Hour (1994): Nominated for a Cable Ace Award
- Nothing in my Closet but my Clothes (1997): Gay and Lesbian American Music Award (GLAMA) winner for best comedy CD
- I’m Not Cindy Brady (2000): GLAMA winner for best comedy CD
- Guaranteed Fresh (2003) : GLAMA winner for best comedy CD
- Live at the Village (2006)
- A Bottom on Top (2007)
