= Lois Bromfield =

Canadian comedian, actor and writer

- Born: 1954 or 1955 (age 71–72); Toronto, Ontario, Canada
- Spouse: Steve Moore (m. 1980; div. 1995)

Comedy career
- Medium: Stand-up comedy, television, film, screenwriting, producing
- Genres: Observational comedy; satire
- Subjects: LGBTQ culture; everyday life; human sexuality; dating; relationships; popular culture
- Website: loisbromfunny.com

Lois Bromfield (born 1954 or 1955) is a Canadian-American comedian, actor, writer and television producer originally from Toronto, Ontario. Her television writing career began when she asked Roseanne Barr for a job on her show Roseanne. Her other television credits include Grace Under Fire, The Jackie Thomas Show and The New Hollywood Squares.

In 1990, Bromfield appeared with Chris Aable in her first television interview on Hollywood Today, where she was interviewed along with her then-husband Steve Moore.

Bromfield was born in Toronto.

She was in a lavender marriage to comedian Steve Moore from 1980 to 1995, which ended after they both decided to publicly come out as gay. Bromfield officially came out as lesbian in 1994 on The Arsenio Hall Show.

Bromfield co-starred along with Bobcat Goldthwait in the 1985 George Carlin HBO television series Apt. 2C of which only the pilot episode was ever made.

Her 2021 memoir, My Dirty Life in Comedy, was one of 13 books recommended by Judd Apatow.

Bromfield later moved Europe.

== Filmography ==
- 1985: Actor, "Sorority Girls from Hell" segment, Television Parts (NBC)
- 1990: Celebrity guest, Hollywood Today
- 1991–1995: Co-producer, writer, Roseanne (ABC)
- 1996: Consulting producer, The Drew Carey Show (ABC)
- 1997: Producer, writing supervisor, Grace Under Fire (ABC)
- 1998: Consulting producer, Brother's Keeper (ABC)
- 2001–2002: Co-producer (Citytv)
- 2006: Producer, At the Cineplex (HBO)
