= Sunday Express (Montreal) =

Canadian newspaper

The Sunday Express
- Type: Weekly newspaper
- Owner: Quebecor
- Founder: Joe Azaria
- Ceased publication: 1985
- Language: English
- Headquarters: Montreal, Quebec, Canada

The Sunday Express was an English-language weekly newspaper published in Montreal.

== Foundation ==
The paper was published by Midnight founder Joe Azaria, who also tried without success to turn the paper into a daily, under the name Daily Express. That experiment lasted less than a year, as the paper was unable to compete with the then-dominant Montreal Star and the second place Montreal Gazette (now Montreal's only English daily).

== Acquisition and closure by Quebecor ==
In 1974, the Sunday Express was acquired by Quebecor, which ran it until closing the paper in 1985.

== Notable contributors ==
Contributors included Antonia Zerbisias, who briefly worked there at the start of her career, as well as drama critic turned theatre director Marianne Ackerman and Andy Nulman, who wrote an entertainment column for the paper. Canadian novelist, Kim Echlin, wrote for the paper while she was a student at McGill. Mike Cohen, presently the head of communications at the English Montreal School Board, columnist for The Suburban and a city councillor in Côte Saint-Luc, was the assistant sports editor from 1981 to 1985.

== See also ==
- List of newspapers in Canada
