= Sweet (company) =

- Type: Travel
- Founded: 2008
- Founder: Jen Rainen and Shannon Wentworth
- Headquarters: San Francisco, United States
- Key people: Shannon Wentworth (CEO)
- Website: http://www.discoversweet.com

Sweet, founded by Shannon Wentworth and Jen Rainen in April 2008, is a travel company, which sells eco-friendly vacation packages and tours to the lesbian community. Sweet's mission is to offer vacations that empower and motivate guests to achieve their personal, professional, and philanthropic goals. Sweet travelers or "Sweeties," have raised over $500,000 in cash and in-kind donations, planted 6,217 trees, removed 407 bags of trash from beaches, and revitalized five schools and parks. In furtherance of Sweet's efforts to help the environment, the company teamed up with CarbonFund.org to help reforest a large area along the Tensas River in Louisiana.

Entertainers who have performed at Sweet events include comediennes Suzanne Westenhoefer, Fortune Feimster, Bridget McManus, Jennie McNulty, Sandra Valls, Gloria Bigelow, as well as singers Jen Foster, Edie Carey, and more.

== See also ==
- Interview: Sweet's Shannon Wentworth on Building Community and Changing the Landscape of Lesbian Travel
- Sweet! Lesbians Offset Carbon Footprint of New Cruise
- Cherrybomb: Sexpectations and Vacations
- Shannon on The Lesbian Podcast
- We like it Sweet
- Back to 100 Women We Love: Class of 2009(in no particular order, cause we love em' all!)
- A bounty of theme cruises this fall
- "Theme cruise ships have bikers, nudity and a whole lot more". nydailynews.com. February 15, 2009.
- Gay, lesbian cruise travel popularity growing
- Sweet Official Website
