= Out & Equal Workplace Summit =

Annual gathering related to LGBT rights in employment

- Location: United States
- Website: http://www.outandequal.org/annual-summit

The Out & Equal Workplace Summit is an annual gathering of over 3,000 business leaders, LGBT employers, LGBT employees and other participants to discuss best practices, network and take part in training sessions. The Out & Equal Workplace Summit is hosted by Out & Equal Workplace Advocates and is held in rotating locations around the United States. The Workplace Summit is considered to be "qualified training in compliance with 5 U.S.C. Chapter 41" of the United States Office of Personnel Management.

== History ==
Out & Equal Workplace Advocates founder Selisse Berry started the Workplace Summits as part of the United Way Bay Area. In 1999, an organization called The Pride Collaborative merged with another organization called COLLEAGUES—a national organization that sponsored the annual "Out & Equal Conference" aimed at human resource professionals and LGBT employees—thus forming Out & Equal Workplace Advocates. That same year, Progress’s Leadership Summit and COLLEAGUES’ Out & Equal Conference combined resources to produce the annual Out & Equal Workplace Summit, which is now one of the keystone programs of the organization.

After officially becoming a national 501(c)(3) nonprofit organization, Out & Equal Workplace Advocates now independently manages the Workplace Summit.

Year	Location	Notable Keynote Speakers and Entertainers
1999	Atlanta, GA	
2000	Seattle, WA	
2001	Northern KY	
2002	Orlando, FL	Patricia Ireland
2003	Minneapolis, MN	
2004	Tempe, AZ	Rebecca Walker, Billie Jean King,
2005	Denver, CO	Judy Shepard, BD Wong, Senator Tammy Baldwin,
2006	Chicago, IL	Richard Florida, George Takei, Yolanda King, Nina Jacobson
2007	Washington, DC	John Amaechi, Brian Graden, Barney Frank
2008	Austin, TX	Carson Kressley, Keith Boykin, Arianna Huffington
2009	Orlando, FL	John Berry, John Quiñones, Leslie Jordan
2010	Los Angeles, CA	Sheryl Lee Ralph, Chely Wright, The Kinsey Sicks
2011	Dallas Fort Worth, TX	Wilson Cruz, Andy Cohen, Margaret Cho, Candis Cayne
2012	Baltimore, MD	Kate Clinton, Brigadier General Tammy Smith
2013	Minneapolis, MN	Janet Mock, Tabatha Coffey, Kathy Najimy, Thelma Houston, Steve Grand
2014	San Francisco, CA	Olympia Dukakis, Lee Daniels, Martha Wash
2015	Dallas, TX	Jason Collins, Lisa Kron, Sydney Lucas, Annise Parker, Cris Williamson
2016	Orlando, FL	
2017	Philadelphia, PA	
2018	Seattle, WA	
2019	Washington, DC	
2020	Las Vegas, NV	

== Program ==
Annually, the Out & Equal Workplace Summit includes workshops, plenary speakers and performances. The Summit's plenaries includes keynotes from LGBT leaders, executives and celebrities and features performances by LGBT and allied musicians.

The Workplace Summit includes an annual award ceremony aimed at recognizing leaders in LGBT workplace equality called The Outies.
