= Andy Nulman =

Canadian entrepreneur

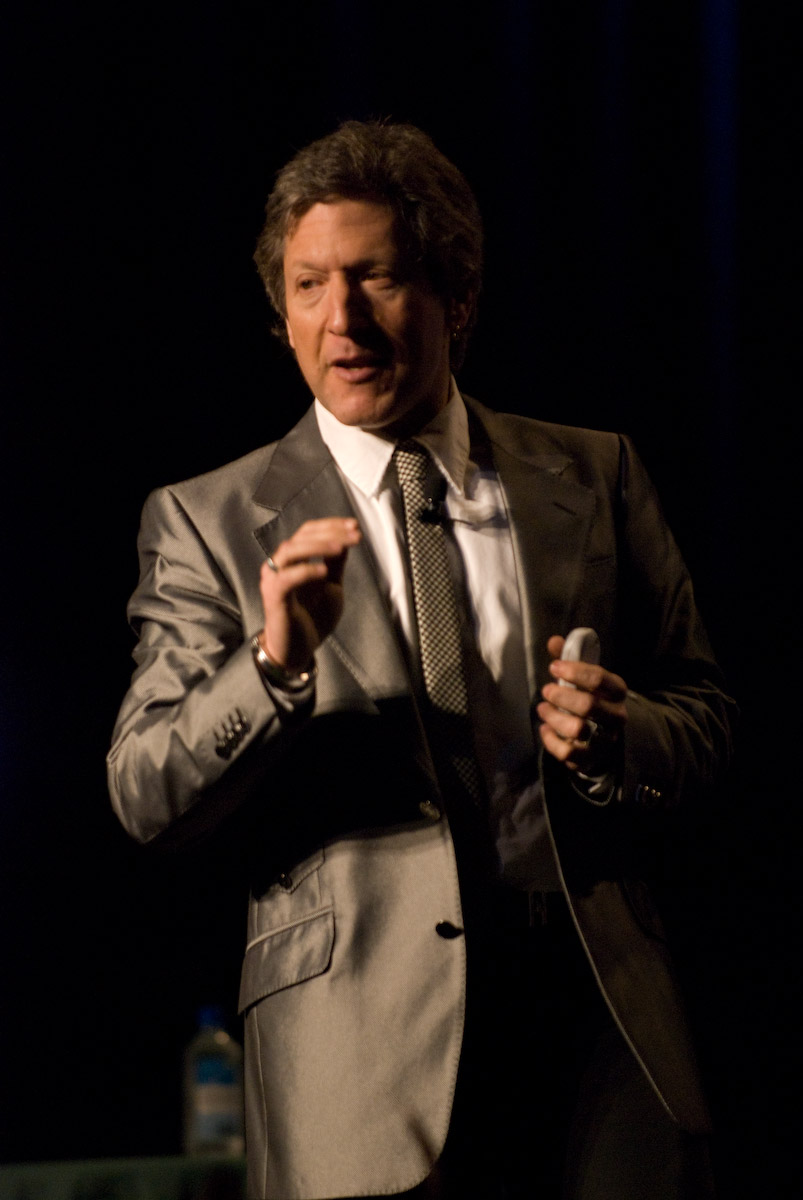
Andy Nulman in January 2008

Andy Nulman (born 1959), is a Montreal-based businessman best known for his activities in co-founding and promoting the Just For Laughs comedy festival; under Nulman's stewardship, the festival grew from a two-day show to a month-long event drawing international audiences. Nulman also sold multimillion-dollar corporate sponsorships and creator and/or executive producer of more than 150 Festival TV shows, in a variety of languages, all over the world. He wrote, produced and hosted the 1997 CBC production of "The Worst of Just For Laughs," created the Gemini-award nominated gay sketch comedy show In Thru the Out Door for CBC and Showtime in 1998, and won a "Best Variety Series" Gemini Award for "The Best of Just For Laughs" in 1993.

In 1999, Nulman left the Festival's full-time employ; but he directed its major gala shows at the St. Denis Theater every July, and remained on the board of directors of the Festival's parent company until 2010 when he returned as president of festivals and television. He left the company in 2015 to work on the city of Montreal's 375 Anniversary Celebrations, and to launch Play The Future, a predictive gaming platform.

== Other Than Just For Laughs ==
In 1999, Nulman co-founded and was both president and CMO of Airborne Mobile, a pioneering mobile media company. In 2005, he and partner Garner Bornstein sold the company to Japan's Cybird Holdings for close to $100 million . In 2006, Airborne was cited as North America's 4th-Fastest Growing Tech Company by the Deloitte Fast 500. In June 2008, Nulman and Bornstein re-purchased the company.

In 2015, he launched the predictive gaming platform Play The Future, which takes the "future-telling" principles of fantasy sports and applies them to multiple real-life data points, including weather, financial markets, film box office, concert attendance, chart position and other pop culture events.

Before joining Just For Laughs, Nulman was a journalist, starting at the age of 16 at the weekly tabloid The Sunday Express, where he stayed for six years, and was eventually promoted to the positions of Entertainment Editor and Promotion Manager. During that period, he also freelanced for publications the likes of Variety, Us Magazine and the rock 'n' roll music bi-weekly Circus Magazine. He attended the Desautels Faculty of Management at McGill University where he graduated with a Bachelor of Commerce degree in 1983.

== Other Accomplishments ==
Nulman is a well-traveled public speaker, and has spoken at conferences the likes of TED Active in California and C2MTL in Montreal. He has written three books: "How To Do The Impossible," "I Almost Killed George Burns" "Pow! Right between The Eyes! Profiting From The Element of Surprise." He has also been a frequent speaker at McGill University, including being honored to speak at the prestigious McGill Alumni Leacock Luncheon and the McGill Institute for the Study of Canada. For three years, he also taught the revolutionary "Marketing and Society" class in McGill's BCom program, where his students learned how to build YouTube channels and use them as a powerful corporate tool. Other accomplishments include being named one of the "Top 40 Under 40" business leaders by the Financial Post in 1997, being voted one of the Top 100 Montrealers of the 20th Century by the Montreal Gazette in 2000, and named a recipient of the McGill Management Achievement Award in 2004. He is a board member of Montreal's StartupFest, and won Startup Canada's 2016's Lifetime Achievement Award for Quebec.
