= Kate Rigg =

American-Canadian actress, comedian and writer

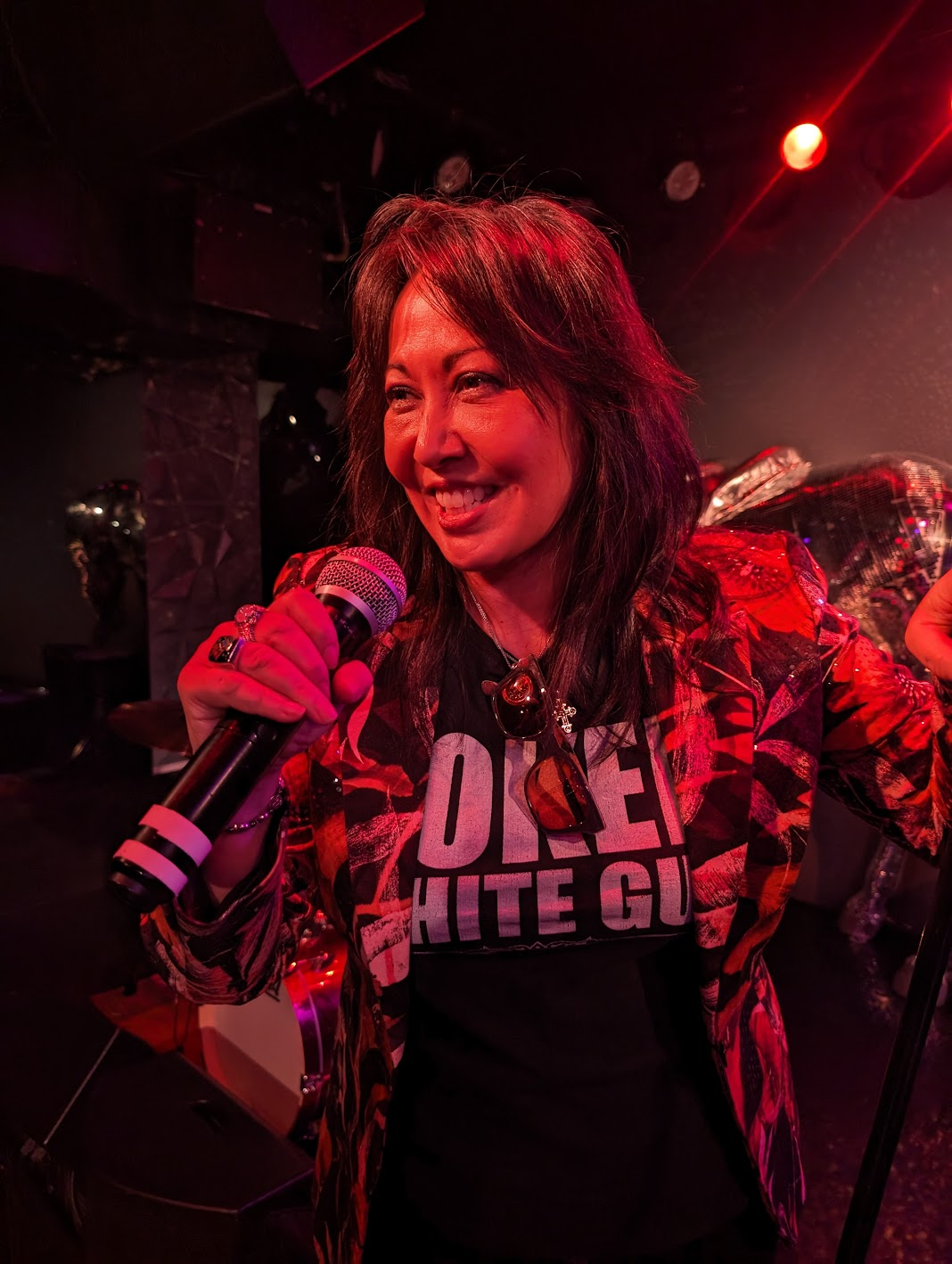
- Rigg doing standup in New York City
- Born: Toronto, Canada
- Education: University of Melbourne (BA); Juilliard School (GrDip)
- Occupations: Actress; comedian; writer
- Years active: 1998–present
- Website: https://www.katerigg.com/

Kate Siahaan-Rigg (known as Kate Rigg or Katie Rigg) is a Queer Asian Canadian, Australian, American actress, comedian, writer and activist, best known for her performance as a comedy correspondent for The Dr Phil Show, and her "NuyorAsian" standup comedy shows, focusing on her experience as a New York based Queer Asian woman.

She has created and produced multiple comedy shows for Television, such as Dance Your Ass Off for NBC Universal, YTV's Cache Craze, and the online show Gonzo Girls.

== Biography ==
Rigg was born and raised in Toronto, Canada. At the age of 17, she ran away from her home to study at the University of Melbourne. She moved to New York and was graduated from the Juilliard School.

After graduation from Juilliard, Rigg co-founded the comedy rock band Slanty Eyed Mama along with fellow Juilliard alum violinist Lyris Hung. The band has continued to perform shows that challenge Asian American stereotypes through comedy and punk rock.

Rigg has since developed several standup comedy shows about the stereotypical tropes of Asian American women.

In 2005, Rigg voiced Esperanza and various voices for Family Guy's fourth season. In 2009 she joined the Dr. Phil show as an on-air comedy correspondent, recurring on a regular basis for three seasons.

In 2020, during the COVID-19 pandemic in Canada, Rigg participated in the virtual edition of We're Funny That Way! alongside performers like Carolyn Taylor, Gavin Crawford, Lea DeLaria, Colin Mochrie, Kinley Mochrie and Deb McGrath. The entire cast were collectively nominated for Best Performance in a Variety or Sketch Comedy Program or Series at the 9th Canadian Screen Awards.

== Filmography ==
=== Film ===
Year	Title	Role	Notes
1999	Speed of Life	Mean nurse	
2005	Stewie Griffin: The Untold Story	Additional Voices	
2011	Joshua Tree	Stacy	
2012	That's What She Said	Lu	
2015	The Trophy Wife	Oma	Short film
2018	Mile 22	Miss Moon	

=== Television ===
Year	Title	Role	Notes
1998	Oz	Reporter	
1998	Law & Order	Various	S8E18 (Anne Forbes), S12E7 (Administrator), S13E9 (Sally Xiao), S14E16 (Sally Xiao)
2003	Law & Order: Criminal Intent	Detective Hinson	
2005-2006	Family Guy	Esperanza, Brandi	Season 4; "Model Misbehavior" and "Stewie B. Goode"
2009-2010	Dr. Phil	Comedy correspondent	For 3 seasons
2010	Law & Order: Special Victims Unit	CSU	Season 12, Episode 5 "Wet"
2018-2019	New Amsterdam	Dr. Rada Gregorian	Season 1; "Cavitation" and "Five Miles West"
2019	The Punisher	Dr. Mason	
