= Funny Gay Males =

American comedy troupe in the 1980s and 1990s

Funny Gay Males was an American comedy troupe in the 1980s and 1990s, consisting of comedians Bob Smith, Danny McWilliams and Jaffe Cohen.

First formed in 1988 after the performers appeared together on a comedy bill at New York City's Pride Week festivities, the troupe performed a touring comedy show which consisted primarily of each member performing his own solo stand-up comedy set, and also made television appearances on programs such as The Joan Rivers Show.

The troupe also collaborated on the 1995 comedy book Growing Up Gay: From Left Out to Coming Out, which was a Lambda Literary Award nominee in the humor category at the 8th Lambda Literary Awards.

The troupe stopped touring for several years in the late 1990s, with each member concentrating instead on his own solo career. They performed a reunion tour in the early 2000s, with Eddie Sarfaty joining the troupe at this time.
