= Jamillah Ross =

Canadian comedienne

- Occupations: Comedian, actress, singer-songwriter
- Spouse: Sean Fisher a.k.a. Suga Jam

Jamillah Ross is a Canadian comedian, actress, and singer-songwriter. She trained through Toronto's The Second City and has performed in improvisation troupes and on stage, television and film. She was in the cast of Show Stopping Number which won a Canadian Comedy Award (CCA) for best improvisational troupe.

== Career ==
Ross started working at Toronto's The Second City comedy club as a server then joined the touring company performing in The Ice Cream Man Cometh and The Puck Stops Here. In May 2003 she returned to Toronto and performed in The Second City's production Armaget-It-On which was nominated for a Canadian Comedy Award (CCA). Ross later wrote and starred in three consecutive headlining shows on the company's main stage.

In 2006, Ross played Sour Kangaroo in a production of Seussical at the Lorraine Kimsa Theatre for Young People. The following year, she appeared in Show Stopping Number: The Improvised Musical which won the CCA for best improv troupe. She was twice nominated for the CCA for best female improvisor. Ross later performed as a member of improv troupe The Dandies.

Ross took part in improvised hidden-camera TV shows Scare Tactics, Howie Do It and Fool Canada. She also had small roles on Toronto-based scripted shows including Flashpoint, Lost Girl, Rookie Blue, Orphan Black, Killjoys, and Kim's Convenience. She also appeared in the feature films Picture Day and Pay the Ghost.

In 2018, critic Lin Young praised Ross's energy, comedic timing and singing voice in the comedic musical Rumspringa Break! Ross was also well received in her starring role in the Toronto Fringe Festival production St. Peon Of The People, a walkabout show in which she played a parking enforcement officer leading the audience on Queen Street West, written and directed by Caroline Azar . Ross received an honourable mention for her performance in the play at Toronto's 2019 SummerWorks theatre festival.

== Personal life ==
Ross is married to Sean Fisher a.k.a. Suga Jam, a Toronto-based comedian, music director and actor. Her music projects are collaborations with Fisher who also produced Show Stopping Number.

== Works ==
=== Film ===
- Picture Day (2012) – Gym teacher
- Pay the Ghost (2015) – Rhonda
- Paw Patrol: The Movie (2021) – Camerawoman
- Firestarter (2022) – Officer Pierce

=== Television ===
- The Toronto Show (2003) – Sassy Neighbour
- Popcultured (2005) – herself
- Scare Tactics
- Mayday (2008)
- Howie Do It (2009)
- Flashpoint (2009) – Wendy
- Orphan Black (2013) – ND Officer
- Cracked (2013) – Uniform
- Rookie Blue (2014) – Landlady
- Lost Girl (2011) – Gladys
- Killjoys (2015–2016) – Delle Seyah's Guard
- Beauty & the Beast (2016) – Female announcer
- Fool Canada (2015)
- The Expanse (2016) – Belter woman
- Kim's Convenience (2016–2017) – Ranisha
- Baroness von Sketch Show (2017–2020)
- Saving Hope (2017) – Officer Jones
- The Good Doctor (2021) – Mildred St. Marry
- Chucky (2021) – Gladys Kravitz

=== Stage ===
- Armaget-it-On (2003)
- Invasion Free Since 1812 (2005)
- Seussical (2006) – Sour Kangaroo
- A Freudian Slip of the Jung
- Show Stopping Number: The Improvised Musical (2007)
- Legs Crossed Hands On Your Lap (2015) – various roles
- Falling Angel (2017) – God
- Rumspringa Break! (2018) – Cinnamon, other roles
- St. Peon of the People (2018–2019) – Officer Rita Mae Nelson

=== Discography ===
- The Very Best of Love and Death (2002) – vocals
- Suga's Last Stand (2008)
- It's All About Christmas Time (2014 single)
