= PopCultured =

Canadian television talk show

- Starring: Elvira Kurt
- Country of origin: Canada

Original release
- Network: CTV Comedy Channel
- Release: April 2005 – 2006

PopCultured is a Canadian television talk show, which aired on The Comedy Network in 2005 and 2006. The program featured stand-up comedian Elvira Kurt and other cast members (Jean Paul, Laurie Elliott, David Reale, Ellen McKinney, Jamillah Ross and Levi MacDougall) poking fun at celebrities in the context of a mock newscast similar to The Daily Show with Jon Stewart, with one interview guest at the centre of each episode.

The show began airing in April 2005.

The show was widely panned by critics, and was canceled after one season, in early 2006, due to poor ratings.
