= Dance Your Ass Off =

American television series

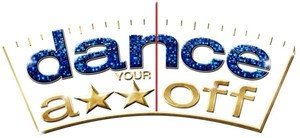
- Broadcast version of Dance Your Ass Off logo
- Genre: Reality Television
- Created by: Kate Rigg; Sally Ann Salsano; Lisa Ann Walter
- Presented by: Marissa Jaret Winokur; Mel B
- Country of origin: United States
- Original language: English

Production
- Production companies: 495 Productions (Series 1); Magical Elves (Series 2)

Original release
- Network: Oxygen Network
- Release: June 29, 2009 – August 30, 2010

Dance Your Ass Off (also rendered in a censored form as Dance Your A** Off for broadcast television mentions and promotions) is a reality competition series on the Oxygen Network hosted by Marissa Jaret Winokur in the first season, then Mel B in season two. Similar to the set up of Dancing with the Stars competitors are paired with a professional dancers in hope of impressing judges and the viewing audience. However, each of the twelve contestants are also hoping to lose weight during the process. It premiered on June 29, 2009. The medical doctor is Rob Huizenga from The Biggest Loser. The season premiere brought in 4.3 million viewers making it the most watched show in history of Oxygen Network. In the judges panel are Danny Teeson, a lifestyle coach and dancing expert, actress Lisa Ann Walter, and professional dancer Mayte Garcia, who only appeared as a guest judge for a week in season 2.

== International broadcasters ==
=== Australia ===
Australia's Nine Network began airing Dance Your Ass Off on July 21, 2009. The first episode attained a low 797,000 viewers (compared with numbers of 1.4-1.6 million viewers on the other two major commercial networks) and coming third out of fifth in overall ratings for the night by a substantial margin. Dance Your Ass Off got some of the lowest numbers the network has seen before in prime-time. The Nine Network removed the show from their schedule and replaced it with episodes of 20 to 1.

There was much criticism to the Nine Network airing Dance Your Ass Off, considering that the Oxygen Network is a low-viewed niche cable network in the United States that only targets young women exclusively with their programming, whereas Nine is a major free-to-air broadcaster for the mass-market. Within three weeks the programme was moved to Nine's multicast digital channel Go! from August 15, 2009, ending October 17 with the finale episode.

The show was panned in its reviews as well in Australia prior to its premiere, with websites such as TV Tonight giving it a rating of a ½-star out of a possible 5 stars.

== International adaptations ==
There have been a number of local version of Dance Your Ass Off around the world based on the original US format. Licensing of the format is handled by NBCUniversal. Vietnam is the only country airing its version of Dance Your Ass Off while other countries are no longer airing its version.

Country	Name	Channel	No. of episodes	First aired
China	Dance Your Ass off China (越跳越漂亮)	Zhejiang	Season 1: 12	13 May 2012 - 29 July 2012
Denmark	De Fede Trin	TV 2	Season 1: 10	19 April 2012 - 7 June 2012
Estonia	Tantsi Tagumik Trimmi	TV3	Season 1: ?	18 March 2012 - 12 May 2012
Finland	Tanssi Peppu Pieneksi	FOX	Season 1: 10	18 September 2012 - 13 November 2012
Kazakhstan	Танцуй! Танцуй!	TV7	Season 1: 14	6 October 2013 - 5 December 2013
Portugal	Toca a Mexer (Let's move)	SIC	Season 1: 15	23 September 2012 - 31 December 2012
South Africa	Dance Your Butt Off	SABC; Omnitrix TV	Season 1: 26; Season 2: 26; Season 3: (upcoming)	12 October 2010 - 5 April 2011; 26 July 2011 - 17 January 2012; 14 February 2020 - (upcoming)
Thailand	Dance Your Fat Off	Channel 3	Season 1: 11; Season 2: 11; Season 3: 9	2 February 2013 - 20 April 2013; 8 March 2014 - 24 May 2014; 1 August 2015 - 10 October 2015
Vietnam	Bước nhảy ngàn cân (Thousand-kilos dance)	VTV3	Season 1: 11; Season 2: 11; Season 3: 11	October 4 - December 12, 2015; August 28 - November 13, 2016; September 3 - November 12, 2017
