= Danny McWilliams =

American comedian

- Born: Daniel Francis McWilliams; February 8, 1956 (age 70); Brooklyn, New York City

Comedy career
- Years active: 1982 – present
- Medium: Stand-up, television, film
- Website: Twitter

Daniel Francis McWilliams (born February 8, 1956), is a New York City-based comedian, author, and actor, born in Brooklyn. He performed with Funny Gay Males (1988-1993, 2001-2003) and has toured with them throughout the United States, Canada and Australia. He has appeared on The Joan Rivers Show, Comedy Central, The Howard Stern Show, The Joey Reynolds Show and WOR 710AM NY. In addition, he co-authored Growing Up Gay: From Left Out to Coming Out (1995) with fellow Funny Gay Males troupe members Bob Smith and Jaffe Cohen.

He has also performed his one-man show which is known as Twelve Angry Women at the Solo Arts Group in New York City, and he performs weekly at Duplex Cabaret Theatre and other clubs throughout New York City.

== Career ==
Notable Work:

- Funny Gay Males
- Growing Up Gay: From Left Out to Coming Out

Awards:

- MAC Award: Comedy Group 1994

== See also ==
- LGBT culture in New York City
- List of LGBT people from New York City
- NYC Pride March
- Stand-up comedy
