= Every Outfit on Sex and the City =

Instagram account and media project about Sex and the City

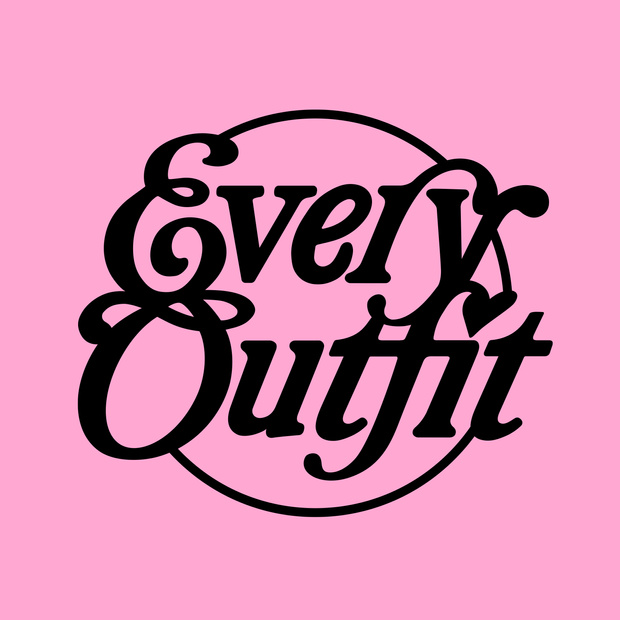
- Website type: Instagram account; fashion commentary
- Available in: English
- Creators: Chelsea Fairless; Lauren Garroni
- Launched: 2016
- Current status: Active

Every Outfit on Sex and the City (@everyoutfitonsatc) is an Instagram account that catalogs and comments on the clothing in the television series Sex and the City. It was created in 2016 by fashion writers Chelsea Fairless and Lauren Garroni, who later wrote a book, We Should All Be Mirandas (2019), and started a podcast, Every Outfit.

== History ==
Fairless and Garroni met as students at Parsons School of Design. They started the account in 2016, after Fairless, then working as a photo researcher, said she wished there were an archive of every outfit from the show and not only the best-known ones. The account documents the outfits worn across the series and comments on them, often mockingly.

The account had 100,000 followers within a month, more than 300,000 by March 2017, and 745,000 by January 2022. Its followers include Sex and the City star Sarah Jessica Parker.

In August 2018, the account posted a behind-the-scenes photo of the cast along with meme versions it had made, which Time covered. In January 2022, Fairless and Garroni discussed the sequel series And Just Like That... in interviews with Vogue and Interview.

== Book ==
In 2019, Houghton Mifflin Harcourt published Fairless and Garroni's We Should All Be Mirandas: Life Lessons from Sex and the City's Most Underrated Character, a humorous advice book based on the character Miranda Hobbes. Glamour published an excerpt on the day of release.

== Podcast ==
In 2021, Fairless and Garroni started a weekly podcast, Every Outfit, hosted on Audioboom. Rachel Syme of The New Yorker wrote that it began as a discussion of Sex and the City and broadened to cover fashion and pop culture generally, and called it "the most thrilling arm" of the project. For the show's 25th anniversary in 2023, the hosts devoted an episode to the pilot and discussed it in an interview with Vanity Fair. The hosts have also performed the podcast as a live show.

In November 2026, Fairless and Garroni launched Every Outfit TV, a video version of the podcast available on Patreon.

== See also ==
- Sex and the City
- And Just Like That...
