= Play It Cool (Lea DeLaria album) =

Studio album by Lea DeLaria
- Released: 2001
- Label: Warner Bros.

Play It Cool is an album by vocalist Lea DeLaria.

== Music and recording ==
This was her debut album for Warner Bros. Records. The 11 tracks are from contemporary musical theater. The arrangements were by Larry Goldings and Gil Goldstein, separately. She uses "several vocal techniques to bring each song to life, including scatting, elongated phrasing, swing, and balladeering".

== Reception ==
Professional ratings
Review scores
| Source | Rating |
|---|---|
| AllMusic | 4/5 stars |

The JazzTimes reviewer commented that "DeLaria is a worthy heir to the Broadway–Vegas axis. More important, she is a bracing-and very welcome-blast of fresh air."

== Track listing ==
1. "The Ballad of Sweeney Todd"
2. "Cool"
3. "I've Got Your Number"
4. "With Every Breath I Take"
5. "All That Jazz"
6. "Life Has Been Good to Me"
7. "Welcome to My Party"
8. "Lowdown-Down"
9. "Once in a Lifetime"
10. "Losing My Mind"
11. "Straight to the Top"

== Personnel ==
- Lea DeLaria – vocals
- Brad Mehldau – piano
- Larry Goldings – piano
- Gil Goldstein – piano, accordion
- Larry Grenadier – bass
- Gregory Hutchinson – drums
- Howard Alden – guitar
- Scott Wendholt – trumpet
- Jon Gordon – alto sax
- Seamus Blake – tenor sax
