= Jaffe Cohen =

American television writer and producer

Jaffe Cohen (born 1962) is an American television writer and producer, most noted as a co-creator with Ryan Murphy and Michael Zam of the television series Feud.

== Career ==
Cohen first became prominent in the 1980s as a member of the comedy troupe Funny Gay Males, alongside Bob Smith and Danny McWilliams. The trio toured for several years, performing a show that consisted of each member performing a solo standup comedy set, including an appearance at the 1991 Just for Laughs festival. They also collaborated on the 1995 comedy book Growing Up Gay: From Left Out to Coming Out, which was a Lambda Literary Award nominee in the humor category at the 8th Lambda Literary Awards.

After the troupe went on hiatus in the late 1990s, he auditioned for the role of Simon in the 1997 film As Good As It Gets, but was passed over for being "too gay" despite Simon being a gay character. He did, however, appear in the film in a smaller supporting role as a party guest. He also performed at the 1997 We're Funny That Way! comedy festival, with his set forming part of David Adkin's 1998 documentary film, and in the 1998 sketch comedy special In Thru the Out Door.

He was one of the writers of the 1999 film Hit and Runway, which won the award for best screenplay at the 1999 Los Angeles Independent Film Festival.

Funny Gay Males briefly reunited in the mid-2000s, adding Eddie Sarfaty as a fourth member. Cohen subsequently became a professor of television and film writing at the State University of New York at Oneonta.

== Awards ==
As a co-producer and writer of Feud, Cohen received a Producers Guild of America nomination for Best Long-Form Television at the 29th Producers Guild of America Awards, a Writers Guild of America nomination for Best Long Form Original Television at the 70th Writers Guild of America Awards, and Emmy Award nominations for Outstanding Limited or Anthology Series and Outstanding Writing for a Limited or Anthology Series or Movie at the 69th Primetime Emmy Awards.
