= The Outies =

Award for LGBT equality in business

The Outies Out & Equal Workplace Awards
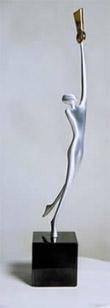
- An Outie award
- Awarded for: Excellence in Workplace Equality
- Country: United States
- Presented by: Out & Equal Workplace Advocates
- First award: 2000
- Website: http://outandequal.org/outie-awards

The Outies, formally known as the Out & Equal Workplace Awards, is an annual awards gala hosted by Out & Equal Workplace Advocates. The Outies honor individuals and organizations that are leaders in advancing equality for lesbian, gay, bisexual, and transgender (LGBT) employees in America's workplaces. The awards are presented annually at the Out & Equal Workplace Summit, a nationwide conference addressing LGBT issues in the workplace.

Outie Awards are given in five different categories, with two recognizing individuals and three recognizing organizations. To win an Outie, recipients must have taken significant action to create more equitable workplaces for members of the LGBT community.

== Award categories ==
The Workplace Excellence Award recognizes any employer that has an historic and ongoing commitment to pursuing and executing workplace equality for LGBTQ employees in their own workplace. This employer has a history of continually raising the bar of workplace equality for others to follow.

The Trailblazer Award recognizes an LGBT person who has made a significant contribution to advancing workplace equality. This individual's activities will have made a marked improvement in their own workplace and/or have contributed to equality nationally.

The Champion Award recognizes any LGBTQ person or ally who has made a significant contribution to advancing workplace equality. The Champion Award winner will have shown a unique commitment to LGBTQ workplace rights and will have used their talents to further that cause, even if at some risk.

The LGBT ERG of the Year Award recognizes a particular employee resource group (ERG), sometimes referred to as a business group or network, that has a proven track record of success in advocating for LGBTQ equal rights in its own workplace.

The Regional Affiliate of the Year Award recognizes an Out & Equal regional affiliate that has demonstrated commitment to the Out & Equal mission through exceptional programming and sound organizational practices.

The Significant Achievement Award recognizes any employer that has made significant strides in the past year in advancing a fair and equitable workplace for its LGBTQ employees, such as: announcing domestic partner health insurance, including gender identity diversity training, or initiating a unique general advertising campaign that includes LGBTQ people.

== Selection process ==
All Outie nominations are read by the Out & Equal awards committee and judging panel, which is made up of a diverse cross-section of leaders in the movement for LGBT workplace equality. Awards Committee members and judges change each year and are expected to opt out of voting if their own affiliations may bias their votes.

Nominees are evaluated on originality, duplicability of initiatives, leadership, results, and other criteria. Organizations are evaluated based on the aforementioned criteria, plus the degree to which they have incorporated the 20 Steps to an Out & Equal Workplace. The previous year's awardees are not considered for the same award for the following two years. Additionally, companies or organizations may only submit one nomination in the organization award categories and one nomination in the individual award categories, for a maximum possible total of two nominations from any one company or organization.

== Outie Award winners ==
=== Workplace Excellence Award ===
Recognizes any employer that has a longstanding commitment to pursuing and executing workplace equality for LGBT employees in their own workplace. This employer has a history of continually raising the bar of workplace equality for others to follow.

- 2017 - Bank of America
- 2016 - Dell
- 2015 - The Walt Disney Company
- 2014 – Chevron
- 2013 – Dow Chemical Company
- 2012 – Google
- 2011 – Accenture
- 2010 – IBM
- 2009 – Sun Microsystems
- 2008 – PepsiCo
- 2007 - Wells Fargo
- 2006 – JPMorgan Chase
- 2005 - Citigroup
- 2004 - Kaiser Permanente and Pacific Gas & Electric Company (Tied)
- 2003 - NCR Corporation
- 2002 - American Airlines
- 2001 – IBM
- 2000 – Kodak

=== Trailblazer Award ===
Recognizes an LGBT person who has made a significant contribution to advancing workplace equality. This individual's activities will have made a marked improvement in their own workplace and/or have contributed to equality nationally.

- 2014 – Greer Puckett, Northrop Grumman
- 2012 – Lance Freedman, Lockheed Martin
- 2011 – Claudia Woody, IBM
- 2010 – Bill Hendrix, Dow Chemical Company
- 2009 - Richard Clark, Accenture
- 2008 - Chris Crespo, Ernst & Young
- 2007 - Dr. Judy Lively, Kaiser Permanente
- 2006 – Emily Jones, Kodak
- 2005 - Leslie (Les) Hohman, General Motors PLUS
- 2004 - Robert Burrell, Ford
- 2003 - Wesley Combs, Witeck-Combs Communications
- 2002 - Dr. Louise Young, Raytheon
- 2001 - Mary Ann Horton, Avaya
- 2000 - Tom Ammiano, Leslie Katz and Susan Leal, San Francisco Supervisors

=== Champion Award ===
The Champion Award recognizes any LGBTQ+ person or ally who has made a significant contribution to advancing workplace equality. The Champion Award winner will have shown a unique commitment to LGBTQ+ workplace rights and will have used their talents to further that cause, even if at some risk.

- 2018 - Jennifer J. Henderson, Capital One
- 2017 - Ramkrishna Sinha, Intel Corporation
- 2016 - Thomas Vilsack, USDA Secretary
- 2015 - Howard Ungerleider, Dow Chemical Company
- 2014 – Vijay Anand, Intuit
- 2013 – Cathy Bessant, Bank of America
- 2012 – Harry van Dorenmalen, IBM
- 2011 – Dr. Sophie Vandebroek, Xerox
- 2010 – Mark Bertolini, Aetna Healthcare
- 2009 - Randy Kammer, Blue Cross and Blue Shield of Florida
- 2008 - William C. Thompson, Jr., City of New York
- 2007 - Ana Duarte McCarthy, Citi
- 2006 – Deborah Dagit, Merck
- 2005 - June R. Cohen, DuPont
- 2004 - Laura Brooks, Kodak
- 2003 - Judy Boyette, University of California
- 2002 - William Perez, CEO of SC Johnson & Son
- 2001 - Cathy Brill & Lisa Vitale, Kodak
- 2000 - Ethel Batten, Lucent

=== LGBT Employee Resource Group of the Year ===
Recognizes a particular employee resource group (ERG), sometimes referred to as a business group or network that has a proven track record of success in advocating for LGBT equal rights in its own workplace.

- 2018 - LGBT Alliance (Cracker Barrel)
- 2017 - IC Pride – (US Intelligence Community)
- 2016 - PRIDE Team Network – (Wells Fargo)
- 2015 - Open & Out (Johnson & Johnson)
- 2014 – Citi PRIDE Network
- 2013 – PRIDE (Lockheed Martin) & LGBTA Business Council (Target)
- 2012 – OutServe (United States Department of Defense)
- 2011 – LGBT Pride Resource Group, Bank of America
- 2010 – The Clorox Company
- 2009 - (Tie) General Motors' People Like Us & US Department of State and USAID's Gays and Lesbians in Foreign Affairs Agencies
- 2008 - Hewlett-Packard's HP PRIDE
- 2007 - Nike's GLBT & Friends Network
- 2006 – GLEAM, Microsoft
- 2005 - Chevron Lesbian & Gay Employee Association (CLGEA)
- 2004 - Lambda Network at Kodak
- 2003 – GLBC at SC Johnson
- 2002 - SEA Shell at Shell Oil Company
- 2001 - Pride at Walt Disney
- 2000 - League of AT&T

=== Regional Affiliate of the Year Award ===
Recognizes an Out & Equal regional affiliate that has demonstrated commitment to the Out & Equal mission through exceptional programming and sound organizational practices.

- 2015 - San Francisco
- 2014 – Chicagoland
- 2013 – Seattle
- 2012 – New York Finger Lakes
- 2011 – Houston
- 2010 – Dallas–Fort Worth

=== Significant Achievement ===
- 2011 – Google
- 2010 – Dow Chemical Company
- 2009 – Salt Lake City Corporation
- 2008 – Goldman Sachs
- 2007 - Ernst & Young
- 2006 – PricewaterhouseCoopers
- 2005 - IBM
- 2004 - Hewlett Packard
- 2003 - Chubb
- 2002 – JPMorgan Chase
- 2001 - Motorola
- 2000 - Ford

=== Selisse Berry Leadership Award ===
Recognizes an individual whose visionary leadership, tireless efforts, and remarkable accomplishments have been a critical contribution toward achieving LGBT workplace equality. In addition to leading change in the world of employment, this leader inspires countless individuals to champion workplace equality for all inclusive of sexual orientation, gender identity, expression, or characteristics.

- 2013 – Kevin Jones
- 2011 – Brian McNaught
- 2008 – Selisse Berry, Founding Executive Director of Out & Equal

=== LGBT Workplace Equality Pioneer ===
- 2007 - Dr. Franklin E. Kameny
