= Maggie Cassella =

American-Canadian actress, comedian and writer

- Born: Hartford, Connecticut, United States
- Occupations: Actress; comedian; writer
- Years active: 1998–present

Maggie Cassella is an American-Canadian actress, comedian and writer, best known for hosting the Canadian television talk show Because I Said So and founding the We're Funny That Way! comedy festival.

== Biography ==
Cassella's double degree in philosophy and women's studies led her to a position at a private boarding school in Connecticut teaching philosophy and religion. Finding that a private school teacher's salary inadequate, she attended law school. After almost ten years as a lawyer dealing with cases involving people with AIDS, transitional issues around marriage and bringing a test case for gay adoption to Connecticut, Cassella quit the legal profession and began her comedy career.

Cassella's stand-up comedy style was a mix of rants and raves. She found she could get an unlimited supply of material from just reading the news, Cassella settled in on her Because I Said So format of sit-down comedy tearing through news topics from law, entertainment, technology, religion, and finishing up with the things that she just found irritating. She has performed Because I Said So for 20 summers in Provincetown as well as in other places in North America.

Eventually, Cassella gained a full-time job and her spouse. One of the original on-air talents on STAR!, she used that job to gain her own talk show called Because I Said So.

BISS, as it was referred to around the station, allowed Cassella to have some fun and interview celebrities. She continues to do those interviews (even though BISS went bust) as a field producer during the Toronto International Film Festival for the syndicated US entertainment show Extra. Over the years, Cassella has interviewed comedy legends such as Phyllis Diller, Bea Arthur and Joan Rivers, as well as performers such as William H. Macy, Jude Law, Juliette Binoche, Robert Downey Jr., Laura Linney, Eartha Kitt, and k.d. lang.

In 2009, Cassella produced and hosted six episodes of The Vent!, a thirty-minute show she co-created and produced, that focuses on one topic from a variety of angles. Her production company, A Sweet Little Production Company, is located in Toronto and she continues to work on developing shows and films.

She is an out lesbian, and a frequent collaborator of US-based lesbian comedian Lea DeLaria. In addition to performing shows together, the duo have also cowritten a book and two screenplays. Cassella was a co-owner of The Flying Beaver Pubaret, a restaurant and performance venue on Parliament Street in Toronto's Cabbagetown neighbourhood until a fire on February 20, 2015, caused the venue to close for good.

She voices Dr. Mulberry, who is the lesbian character in the 2019 version of Clifford the Big Red Dog.

== Filmography ==
=== Film ===
Year	Title	Role	Notes
2007	Do Not Bend	Linda	Short film
2007	Burgeon and Fade	Linda	Short film
2015	Gray Area	Gail	Short film

=== Television ===
Year	Title	Role	Notes
1998	In Thru the Out Door	Various	TV film
2001	Twice in a Lifetime	Relative #1	"Daddy's Girl"
2001	Kiss My Act	Stand-Up Comic	TV film
2003	2 Smart Blondes	Host	TV film
2004	Doc	Waitress	"Searching for Bonnie Fisher"
2004	ReGenesis	Anne Katzman	"Blackout"
2009	The Vent	Various	TV series
2011	Degrassi: The Next Generation	Counsellor	"U Don't Know: Part 2"
2014	Max & Shred	Photographer	"The Switch Shifty Birthday Party"
2020	Clifford the Big Red Dog	Dr. Mulberry (voice)	3 episodes

== Discography ==
- Because I Said So (2002)
