= Bob Smith (comedian) =

American novelist

Bob Smith (December 24, 1958 – January 20, 2018) was an American comedian and author. Born in Buffalo, New York, Smith was the first openly gay comedian to appear on The Tonight Show and the first openly gay comedian to have his own HBO half-hour comedy special. Smith, along with fellow comedians Jaffe Cohen and Danny McWilliams, formed the comedy troupe Funny Gay Males in 1988.

== Career ==
Smith performed at the inaugural We're Funny That Way! comedy festival in 1997, and appeared in the festival's documentary film in 1998. In the same year he was part of In Thru the Out Door, an LGBT sketch comedy special.

With Funny Gay Males, Smith is the co-author of Growing Up Gay: From Left Out to Coming Out (1995). Smith is also the author of two books of biographical essays. Openly Bob (1997) received a Lambda Literary Award for best humor book.

Way to Go, Smith! (1999) was nominated for a 2000 Lambda Literary Award in the same category. Smith published his first novel, Selfish and Perverse, in 2007, and Remembrance of Things I Forgot in 2011.

He published a new collection of essays, Treehab: Tales from My Natural Wild Life, in 2016. The essays covered a wide range of subjects including his career in stand-up, his love of nature, and his experience with ALS.

== Personal life ==
While taping a 2007 comedy special for Logo, Smith disclosed that he was suffering from a neurological disorder. He described his symptoms at that time as slurred speech, making him sound inebriated. In response to an August 2012 New York Times article on openly gay male stand-up comedians, Smith posted a comment stating he had ALS.

While competing on Chopped, comedian Judy Gold mentioned she was playing for an ALS charity in honor of a friend of hers who had ALS and could no longer speak. Further research shows that Gold did the benefit in honor of Smith.

In February 2013, Smith gave a candid interview to Canada's Global News, where he elaborated about his condition. The article also revealed that Smith assisted with the conceiving of fellow LGBTQ comedian Elvira Kurt's children, who with Kurt reside in Canada; and that he was a direct descendant of Henry Smith of Pelham, an early settler of Canada's Niagara Region for whom the Henry of Pelham Winery is named.

Bob Smith died on January 20, 2018, from Lou Gehrig's disease in his Manhattan home at 59 years of age.
