= We're Funny That Way! =

Annual comedy festival in Toronto, Ontario, Canada

- Genre: Comedy festival
- Locations: Toronto, Ontario, Canada
- Founded: 1996; 30 years ago
- Website: werefunnythatway.com

We're Funny That Way began as an annual charity comedy festival in Toronto, Ontario, Canada, in 1996. Launched in 1996 by Maggie Cassella, the festival featured stand-up and sketch comedy shows by lesbian, gay, bisexual and transgender comedians. It ran until 2012 when it took a five-year hiatus, returning in 2017 (produced by Ford Cassella Productions). The festival has grown to a broader performance festival and now includes musicians, story-tellers, burlesque artists, plays, drag performances, generally following the genres associated with live cabaret.

The inaugural festival was held in April 1997 at Toronto's Buddies in Bad Times theatre.

Proceeds from the festival support the We're Funny That Way Foundation, aimed at making transformational donations to LGBTQ charities across Canada.

The festival was the subject of the 1998 documentary We're Funny That Way!, a film by David Adkin, which interviewed and featured performance clips of various performers who appeared at the inaugural festival. A short-run television series produced by Maggie Cassella for OUTtv also aired in 2007 in conjunction with the festival's 10th anniversary, using the same format to profile comedians appearing at the 2005 and 2006 editions of the event.

== Film ==
Comedians profiled in the 1998 documentary film included Steve Moore, Christopher Peterson, Scott Capurro, Maggie Cassella, Kate Clinton, Jaffe Cohen, Lea DeLaria, Elvira Kurt, Bob Smith, John McGivern and The Nellie Olesons.

The film was screened at various LGBT film festivals, but was distributed primarily as a television special on Bravo Canada, HBO and Citytv.

== Television series ==
A spinoff television series, also titled We're Funny That Way!, aired on Canada's OutTV in 2007. The six-episode series featured highlights from the 2005 and 2006 We're Funny That Way festivals, including performances by Kate Rigg, Dina Martina, Maggie Cassella and Trevor Boris.

In 2020, during the COVID-19 pandemic in Canada, a virtual edition of We're Funny That Way! was produced for streaming by CBC Gem. Performers included Maggie Cassella, Katie Rigg, Carolyn Taylor, Gavin Crawford, Lea DeLaria, Colin Mochrie, Kinley Mochrie and Deb McGrath, who were all collectively nominated for Best Performance in a Variety or Sketch Comedy Program or Series at the 9th Canadian Screen Awards. The special won the award for Best Performing Arts Program.
