= Because I Said So (TV series) =

Because I Said So is a 2002 Canadian talk show television series hosted by former lawyer, stand-up comedian, and actress Maggie Cassella.

Maggie Cassella hosts celebrities who talk about the worst aspects of the entertainment industry.
