= In Thru the Out Door =

- Genre: Sketch comedy
- Starring: Maggie Cassella; Jaffe Cohen; Lea DeLaria; Craig Francis; Robin Greenspan; Elvira Kurt; Bob Smith; Suzanne Westenhoefer; Jonathan Wilson
- Country of origin: Canada
- Original language: English

Original release
- Network: CBC Television
- Release: June 22, 1998

In Thru the Out Door is a Canadian comedy special, which aired on CBC Television on 22 June 1998. Created by Andy Nulman and billed as "network television's first-ever all-queer, all-star sketch comedy show", the special was a sketch comedy program highlighting LGBTQ comedians who had performed in the Queer Comics program at the Just for Laughs festival.

Comedians appearing on the special included Maggie Cassella, Jaffe Cohen, Lea DeLaria, Craig Francis, Robin Greenspan, Elvira Kurt, Bob Smith, Suzanne Westenhoefer and Jonathan Wilson. Sketches included a game show where people with HIV/AIDS had to gamble their medications to get health coverage, a parody of The Honeymooners that recast the show's main characters as Gertrude Stein, Alice B. Toklas and Pablo Picasso, a "House Straighteners" service that helped LGBT people "de-gay" their homes when their parents were about to visit, and a sports bar for people who were not good at sports.

The special received two Gemini Award nominations at the 14th Gemini Awards in 1999, for Best Direction in a Variety, or Performing Arts Program or Series (Michael McNamara) and Best Music in a Variety Program or Series (Carole Pope).
