= Steve Moore (comedian) =

American comedian (1954–2014)

- Born: Steven Spencer Moore; June 15, 1954; Danville, Virginia, U.S.
- Died: May 24, 2014 (aged 59); Danville, Virginia, U.S.
- Education: Virginia Commonwealth University
- Notable work: Drop Dead Gorgeous (A Tragi-Comedy): The Power of HIV-Positive Thinking
- Spouse: Lois Bromfield (m. 1980; div. 1995)

Comedy career
- Years active: 1980s–2000s
- Medium: Stand-up comedy, television, film, writing
- Genres: Observational comedy; satire
- Subjects: LGBTQ culture; everyday life; human sexuality; HIV/AIDS; current events

Steven Spencer Moore (June 15, 1954 – May 24, 2014) was an American stand-up comedian, best known for his 1997 HBO comedy special Drop Dead Gorgeous (A Tragi-Comedy): The Power of HIV-Positive Thinking, about his experiences living with HIV/AIDS.

== Biography ==
Born and raised in Danville, Virginia, he attended Virginia Commonwealth University in the 1970s.

Although gay, he was in a lavender marriage to Canadian comedian Lois Bromfield from 1980 to 1995 which ended after they both decided to publicly come out as gay. Moore frequently performed as the warm-up comedian for tapings of Roseanne, on which Bromfield was a writer; he also appeared in Roseanne Barr's 1992 comedy special Roseanne Arnold: Live From Trump Castle, and was a warm-up comedian for Margaret Cho's sitcom All American Girl.

Diagnosed HIV-positive in 1989, he came out about both his sexuality and his HIV status in the mid-1990s, developing a one-man comedy show about life with HIV which became Drop Dead Gorgeous. Bromfield came out as lesbian around the same time.

He also performed at the inaugural We're Funny That Way! comedy festival in 1997, and appeared in the festival's documentary film in 1998, and had supporting roles in the film Love Kills and the sitcom Ellen. Despite the increased profile and strong critical reviews he gained from the HBO special, however, a subsequent national comedy tour was not as successful; just nine people attended the tour's opening show in San Francisco, and several other shows had to be canceled due to poor ticket sales.

Moore continued to support himself with smaller-scale comedy touring, including performing at HIV/AIDS and LGBT conferences and events, and as a speaker on AIDS and HIV issues.

Moore died on May 24, 2014, at his residence in Danville, Virginia, aged 59.
