= John McGivern =

American actor and writer (born 1954)

- Born: John Joseph McGivern; November 16, 1954 (age 71); Milwaukee, Wisconsin
- Education: St. Lawrence Seminary
- Occupation: Actor
- Partner: Steve Brandt

John McGivern (born in Milwaukee, Wisconsin) is an American actor and writer, known for playing Bruce McIntosh in the Disney film The Princess Diaries and many commercials for companies such as Kohl's department store, Sears, and Philadelphia Cream Cheese. He is a graduate of St. Lawrence Seminary, in Mount Calvary, WI.

In 2010 he received an Emmy Award for Outstanding Achievement for Individual Excellence On Camera: Programming - Performer in the Chicago/Midwest region.

As a playwright, his work includes Shear Madness, a comedic murder mystery with audience participation elements, and several one-man monologue shows. He performed at the inaugural We're Funny That Way! comedy festival in 1997, and appeared in the festival's documentary film in 1998.

He is also the host of Around the Corner with John McGivern, a Milwaukee PBS series in which he visits and profiles various communities throughout Wisconsin. He is also the host of John McGivern's Main Streets, a PBS Wisconsin series in which he visits and profiles various communities throughout the Midwest.
