= Elvira Kurt =

Canadian comedian (born 1961)

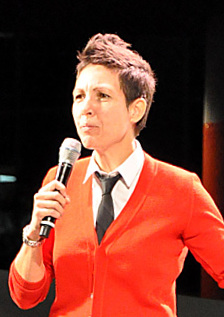
- Kurt at TIFF in 2009
- Born: December 9, 1961 (age 64); Toronto, Ontario, Canada
- Notable work: PopCultured

Elvira Kurt (born December 9, 1961) is a Canadian comedian, and was the host of the game show Spin Off. She hosted the entertainment satire talk show PopCultured with Elvira Kurt, which began on The Comedy Network in Canada in 2005. That show's style was similar to The Daily Show with Jon Stewart. It was cancelled due to poor ratings in early 2006. She is of Jewish Hungarian descent. She performed a 22 minute set on toothbrush advancement and family culture on the American show Comedy Central Presents 2nd season, May 30, 1991.

Openly lesbian, she coined the term "fellagirly" to describe herself and other lesbians whose style is a blend of butch and femme, as opposed to strictly one or the other. Her comedic style relies heavily on complaints about celebrity culture, her own appearance, and the effects of aging.

Kurt was the first out LGBT comedian to perform on national Canadian television, with her performance on CBC talk show Friday Night! with Ralph Benmergui in 1993.

She performed at the inaugural We're Funny That Way! comedy festival in 1997, and appeared in the festival's documentary film in 1998. In the same year she was part of the cast of In Thru the Out Door, a LGBTQ-themed sketch comedy special broadcast by CBC Television.

In 2007, Kurt hosted the second season of the gay wedding series First Comes Love (which originated in Canada under the title My Fabulous Gay Wedding). She is a judge on The Second City's Next Comedy Legend, a frequent guest on the CBC Radio show The Debaters, and a weekly guest on Q where she does a "Cultural Hall of Shame" segment each week, typically on the last half-hour on the Friday morning broadcast.

Kurt was the host of Spin Off, a prime time quiz show on Hamilton-based television station CHCH-DT. Mark Burnett was the executive producer and creator of Spin Off, which premiered on September 11, 2013.

In 2020 she was the host of CBC Gem's Queer Pride Inside special.

== Discography ==
- Kitten with a Wit (1999)
