= Kate Clinton =

American comedian (born 1947)

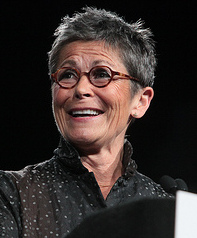
- Clinton in 2010
- Born: November 9, 1947 (age 78); Buffalo, New York, U.S.
- Education: Le Moyne College (BA); Colgate University (MA)
- Partner: Urvashi Vaid (1988–2022)
- Website: kateclinton.net

Kate Clinton (born November 9, 1947) is an American comedian specializing in political commentary from an LGBTQ point of view.

== Early life and education ==
Clinton was born in Buffalo, New York. She was raised in a large Catholic family in the state of New York. She attended Le Moyne College, a small Jesuit liberal arts college in Syracuse, New York, and received her master's degree from Colgate University in the Village of Hamilton. Clinton went on to teach high school English for eight years before becoming a comedian.

== Career ==
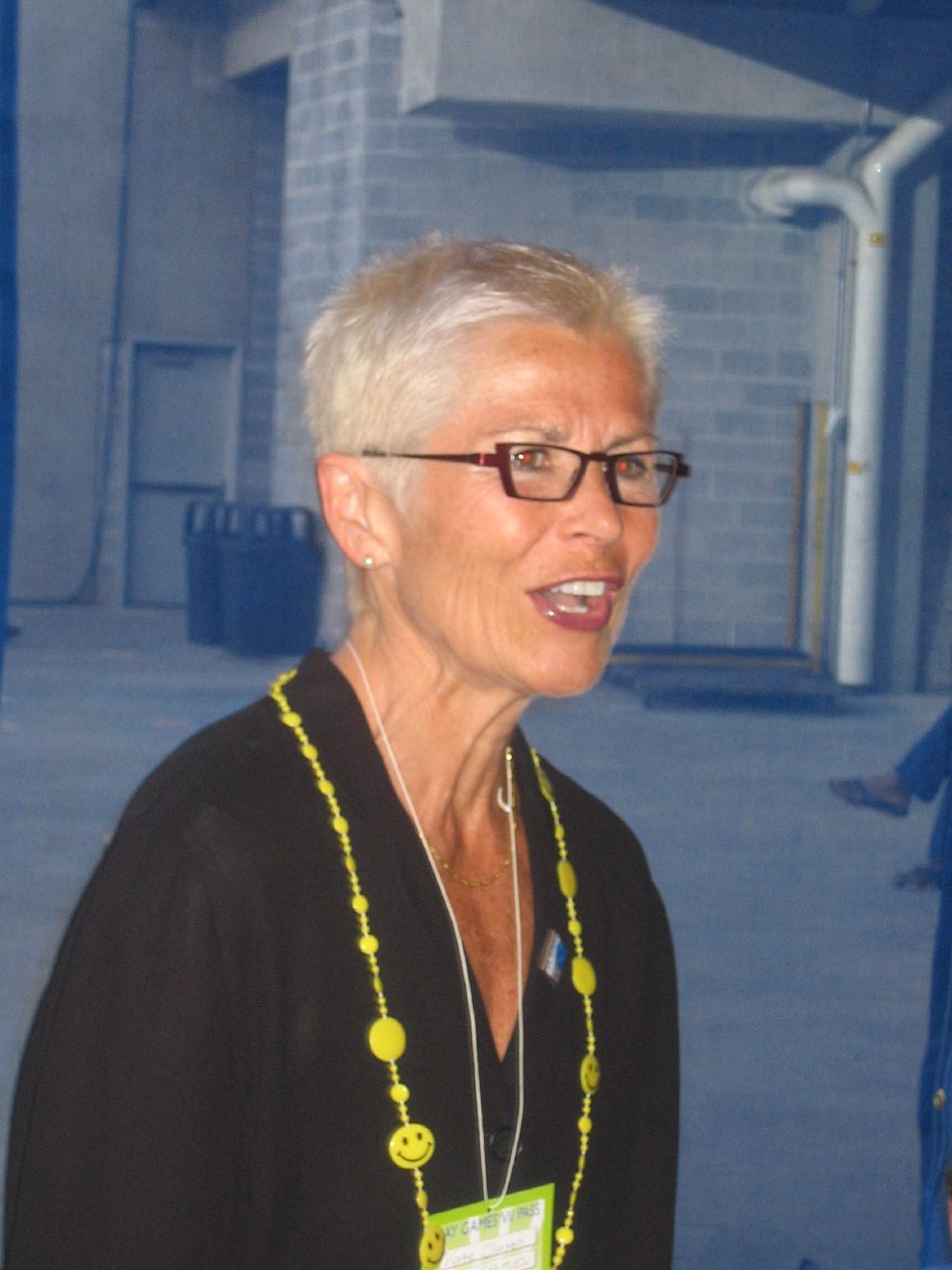
Clinton at Soldier Field during the opening ceremonies of the 2006 Gay Games

She began her stand-up career in 1981 using her lesbianism, her Catholic upbringing and current politics for her jokes. Clinton is a self-described "fumerist," or feminist humorist.

In addition to comedy appearances and one-woman shows such as Lady HAHA, Climate Change, Correct Me If I'm Right, All Fracked Up and Out Is In, she has written three books: Don't Get Me Started, What the L? and I Told You So. She performed at the inaugural We're Funny That Way! comedy festival in 1997, and appeared in the festival's documentary film in 1998.

Clinton has made eight CDs including Climate Change, and two DVDs.

She was a regular columnist for the national monthly magazine The Progressive and the national gay news magazine The Advocate. She also wrote blogs for HuffPost. She has made numerous appearances on television, and has served as grand marshal of pride parades. When the U.S. invasion of Afghanistan began, she was a part-time commentator on CNN.

Clinton performed on Cyndi Lauper's True Colors tour in 2008. Also in 2008, she went on her "Hilarity Clinton '08" one-person show tour.

Clinton is a regular MC at the Out & Equal Workplace Summit.

== Personal life ==
Clinton lived in New York City and Provincetown with her partner Urvashi Vaid from 1988 until Vaid's death in 2022. Vaid was executive director of the National Gay and Lesbian Task Force (1988–92) and subsequently worked as an activist and writer.
