= Gregory-Portland High School =

School in Texas, United States

Location
- 4601 Wildcat Drive; Portland, Texas 78374; United States; 27°54′16″N 97°19′17″W

Information
- Type: Co-Educational, Public, Secondary
- Principal: Christopher Morrow
- Teaching staff: 97.37 (FTE)
- Grades: 9-12
- Enrollment: 1,500 (2023-2024)
- Student to teacher ratio: 15.41
- Colors: Red & Blue
- Athletics: UIL Class 5A
- Athletics conference: University Interscholastic League
- Mascot: Wildcat
- Newspaper: The Cat's Print
- Website: www.g-pisd.org/o/gphs

Gregory-Portland High School is a high school in Portland, Texas, and is a part of the Gregory-Portland Independent School District in southeastern San Patricio County. In addition to Portland, the school also serves the city of Gregory as well as the census-designated place of Tradewinds. The new Gregory-Portland High School was completed in the fall of 2002, and is physically large enough for a student population of 2,400 (UIL 6A).

== Academics ==
Gregory-Portland has been noted as a:

- U.S. Department of Education Blue Ribbon School of Excellence 1999–2000.
- A "Just for the Kids High-Performing School" in reading and Mathematics 2000–2002.

=== State competition ===
- One Act Play
  - Champions - 1980 (3A), 1986 (4A), 1987 (4A), 1989 (4A), 1990 (4A), 1997 (4A), 2002 (4A),
  - Runner Up - 1988 (4A), 1994 (4A)
  - 3rd - 1992 (4A)
- Welding National Champions
  - 2021(5A), 2022(5A)

== Athletics ==
For the 2024-2026 biennium, the Wildcats compete in UIL 5A Div 2 District 14 for football, and 5A District 29 for all other sports.

=== State competition ===
- Girls Track
  - Champions - 1981 (4A), 1982 (4A)
- Volleyball
  - Champions - 1967 (2A), 1973 (3A)
  - Runner Up - 1968 (2A), 1969 (3A), 1972 (3A), 1976 (3A)

== Notable people ==
=== Alumni ===
- Martin Dossett - former NFL player
- Walker Janek - 2024 first round MLB draft pick for the Astros
- Mitch Morris - actor and attorney
- Anthony Stolarz - NHL Goaltender
- Steve Trevino - Comedian
- Don Williams - country singer and songwriter
