= The Politics of Dancing =

The Politics of Dancing may refer to:

- The Politics of Dancing (Re-Flex album), 1983
  - "The Politics of Dancing" (song), the title track from this album
- The Politics of Dancing (Paul van Dyk album), 2001
  - The Politics of Dancing 2, 2005
