= GPISD =

GPISD can refer to the following Texas school districts:

- Grand Prairie Independent School District (Dallas-Fort Worth area)
- Galena Park Independent School District (Houston area)
- Gregory-Portland Independent School District (Corpus Christi area)
