= Martin Dossett =

American gridiron football player (born 1978)

No. 8, 19, 89, 84
- Positions: Wide receiver, kick returner

Personal information
- Born: October 30, 1978 (age 48); Portland, Texas, U.S.
- Listed height: 6 ft 0 in (1.83 m)
- Listed weight: 200 lb (91 kg)

Career information
- High school: Gregory-Portland (TX)
- College: Baylor
- NFL draft: 2001: undrafted

Career history
- Wichita Stealth (2002); Louisiana Rangers (2002); Green Bay Packers (2003)*; Barcelona Dragons (2003)*; BC Lions (2003)*; Memphis Xplorers (2003)*; Corpus Christi Hammerheads (2004–2008)
- * Offseason or practice squad member only

Martin William Dossett (born October 30, 1978) is a former NFL wide receiver who signed with the Green Bay Packers in 2003. He played college football & ran track at Baylor University. As of January 2025, his son, Mason, is a redshirt wide receiver at Baylor. Dossett has played in professional leagues such as the NIFL, NFL Europe and AF2 before playing in Corpus Christi, Texas, for the Corpus Christi Hammerheads of the Intense Football League.
