= Portland Public Schools =

Portland Public Schools or Portland School District may refer to:

- Portland Public Schools (Maine), in Portland, Maine, U.S.
- Portland Public Schools (Oregon), in Portland, Oregon, U.S.
- Portland Public Schools (Connecticut), in Portland, Connecticut, U.S.
- Portland Public School District (Michigan), in Portland, Michigan, U.S.
- Portland School District (Arkansas), a former school district in Arkansas, U.S.
- Gregory-Portland Independent School District
