= GLAAD Media Award for Outstanding Film – Limited Release =

US-based LGBT annual film awards

- Awarded for: Excellence in depiction of the LGBT (lesbian, gay, bisexual, and transgender) community in a limited-release film
- Country: United States
- Presented by: GLAAD
- First award: March 1994; 32 years ago
- Currently held by: A Nice Indian Boy & Plainclothes (2026)

The GLAAD Media Award for Outstanding Film – Limited Release is an annual award that honors films that received a limited release for excellence in the depiction of LGBT (lesbian, gay, bisexual, and transgender) characters and themes. It is one of several categories of the annual GLAAD Media Awards, which are presented by GLAAD—an American non-governmental media monitoring organization—at ceremonies held primarily in New York City and Los Angeles between March and May.

The award was first given as Outstanding Independent Film at the 7th GLAAD Media Awards in 1996 to The Incredibly True Adventure of Two Girls in Love, where a clear distinction was made between films that received a limited release versus a wide release. It would be retitled to its current name during the following year. Previously, The Wedding Banquet was given a Vito Russo Film Award at the 5th GLAAD Media Awards in 1994, in a separate category from Outstanding Studio Film. GLAAD considers both The Wedding Banquet and The Incredibly True Adventure of Two Girls in Love as part of this category. Due to the impact of the COVID-19 pandemic on cinema, during the ceremonies in 2021 and 2022, the category also included films supposed to receive a theatrical release, but ended up airing on television or streaming services instead. Starting with the 2023 ceremony, due to the reorganization of the categories, this award now excludes streaming films.

For a film to be eligible, it must be released by a recognized film distribution company and play for paid admission in Los Angeles for seven consecutive days. Limited release is defined by a combination of criteria such as the numbers of screens, budget, and visibility. The award is given to the film and may be accepted by any of the producers, directors, writers, or actors. Limited-release films selected by GLAAD are evaluated based on four criteria: "Fair, Accurate, and Inclusive Representations" of the LGBT community, "Boldness and Originality" of the project, significant "Impact" on mainstream culture, and "Overall Quality" of the project.

GLAAD monitors mainstream media to identify which films will be nominated, while also issuing a call for entries that encourages media outlets to submit films for consideration. By contrast, in order for films created by and for LGBT audiences to be considered for nomination, they must be submitted after the call for entries. Winners are determined by a plurality vote by GLAAD staff and its board, Shareholders Circle members, (Note: The Shareholders Circle consists of individuals who have made a donation of $1,500 or more.) volunteers and affiliated individuals. As of 2023, the award has been given to 31 films. At the 35th GLAAD Media Awards in 2024, the award was given to Monica, distributed by IFC Films.

== Winners and nominees ==
Initially, GLAAD only revealed the winners at press releases, with the awards being given during the ceremonies. Starting with the 8th GLAAD Media Awards in 1997, the nominees in all categories were made public, with the winners being revealed during the ceremonies.

Table key
‡	Indicates the winner

=== 1990s ===
1990s winners and nominees
Award year	Film	Distributor	Ref(s).
1994 (Note: Given as a Vito Russo Film Award) (5th)	The Wedding Banquet ‡	The Samuel Goldwyn Company	
1996 (Note: Category was named Outstanding Independent Film.) (7th)	The Incredibly True Adventure of Two Girls in Love ‡	Fine Line Features	
1997 (8th)	Beautiful Thing ‡	Sony Pictures Classics	
1997 (8th)	Antonia's Line	First Look Studios	
1997 (8th)	Costa Brava	DTK	
1997 (8th)	French Twist	Miramax	
1997 (8th)	It's My Party	Metro-Goldwyn-Mayer	
1997 (8th)	Stonewall	Strand Releasing	
1998 (9th)	Ma vie en rose (My Life in Pink) ‡	Sony Pictures Classics	
1998 (9th)	All Over Me	Fine Line Features	
1998 (9th)	Bent	Goldwyn Films	
1998 (9th)	Different for Girls	First Look Studios	
1998 (9th)	Lilies	Alliance Atlantis	
1999 (10th)	High Art ‡	October Films	
1999 (10th)	The Hanging Garden	G2 Films	
1999 (10th)	Steam: The Turkish Bath	Strand Releasing	
1999 (10th)	Velvet Goldmine	Miramax	

=== 2000s ===
2000s winners and nominees
Award year	Film	Distributor	Ref(s).
2000 (11th)	Boys Don't Cry ‡	Fox Searchlight Pictures	
2000 (11th)	All About My Mother	Warner Bros.	
2000 (11th)	Better Than Chocolate	Trimark Pictures	
2000 (11th)	Edge of Seventeen	Strand Releasing	
2000 (11th)	Show Me Love	Sonet Film	
2001 (12th)	The Broken Hearts Club ‡	Sony Pictures Classics	
2001 (12th)	Aimée & Jaguar	Zeitgeist Films	
2001 (12th)	Before Night Falls	Fine Line Features	
2001 (12th)	Urbania	Lionsgate Films	
2002 (13th)	Hedwig and the Angry Inch ‡	Fine Line Features	
2002 (13th)	Big Eden	Wolfe Video	
2002 (13th)	Nico and Dani	Teodora Film	
2002 (13th)	Punks	None	
2002 (13th)	Songcatcher	Lionsgate Films	
2003 (14th)	Kissing Jessica Stein ‡	Fox Searchlight Pictures	
2003 (14th)	8 Women	Focus Features	
2003 (14th)	Borstal Boy	Strand Releasing	
2003 (14th)	His Secret Life	Strand Releasing	
2003 (14th)	Y tu mamá también	IFC Films	
2004 (15th)	Yossi & Jagger ‡	Strand Releasing	
2004 (15th)	Die, Mommie, Die!	Sundance Film Series	
2004 (15th)	Gasoline	Strand Releasing	
2004 (15th)	Madame Satã	Wellspring Media, Inc.	
2004 (15th)	Mambo Italiano	Samuel Goldwyn Films	
2005 (16th)	Bad Education ‡	Sony Pictures Classics	
2005 (16th)	Bear Cub	TLA Releasing	
2005 (16th)	Blue Gate Crossing	Strand Releasing	
2005 (16th)	Brother to Brother	Wolfe Releasing	
2005 (16th)	The Mudge Boy	Strand Releasing / Showtime	
2006 (17th)	Transamerica ‡	The Weinstein Company	
2006 (17th)	Beautiful Boxer	Regent Releasing / here! Films	
2006 (17th)	Mysterious Skin	TLA Releasing	
2006 (17th)	Saving Face	Sony Pictures Classics	
2006 (17th)	Walk on Water	Samuel Goldwyn Films	
2007 (18th)	Quinceañera ‡	Sony Pictures Classics	
2007 (18th)	The History Boys	Fox Searchlight Pictures	
2007 (18th)	Imagine Me & You	Fox Searchlight Pictures	
2007 (18th)	Shortbus	ThinkFilm	
2007 (18th)	Summer Storm	Regent Releasing	
2008 (19th)	The Bubble ‡	Strand Releasing	
2008 (19th)	Dirty Laundry	Codeblack Entertainment	
2008 (19th)	Itty Bitty Titty Committee	Pocket Releasing	
2008 (19th)	Nina's Heavenly Delights	Regent Releasing	
2008 (19th)	Whole New Thing	Picture This! Entertainment	
2009 (20th)	Noah's Arc: Jumping the Broom ‡	Logo Films	
2009 (20th)	Shelter ‡	Regent Releasing	
2009 (20th)	The Edge of Heaven	Strand Releasing	
2009 (20th)	Save Me	First Run Features	
2009 (20th)	XXY	Film Movement	

=== 2010s ===
2010s winners and nominees
Award year	Film	Distributor	Ref(s).
2010 (21st)	Little Ashes ‡	Regent Releasing	
2010 (21st)	Casi Divas	Maya Entertainment	
2010 (21st)	The Country Teacher	Film Movement	
2010 (21st)	Phoebe in Wonderland	ThinkFilm	
2010 (21st)	The Secrets	Monterey Media	
2011 (22nd)	I Love You Phillip Morris ‡	Roadside Attractions	
2011 (22nd)	Howl	Oscilloscope Pictures	
2011 (22nd)	La Mission	Screen Media Ventures	
2011 (22nd)	Patrik, Age 1.5	Regent Releasing	
2011 (22nd)	Undertow	Wolfe Releasing	
2012 (23rd)	Pariah ‡	Focus Features	
2012 (23rd)	Circumstance	Roadside Attractions	
2012 (23rd)	Gun Hill Road	Motion Film Group	
2012 (23rd)	Tomboy	Rocket Releasing	
2012 (23rd)	Weekend	Sundance Selects	
2013 (24th)	Any Day Now ‡	Music Box Films	
2013 (24th)	Keep the Lights On	Music Box Films	
2013 (24th)	Mosquita y Mari	Wolfe Releasing	
2013 (24th)	Musical Chairs	Paladin	
2013 (24th)	North Sea Texas	Strand Releasing	
2014 (25th)	Concussion ‡	The Weinstein Company	
2014 (25th)	Geography Club	Breaking Glass Pictures	
2014 (25th)	Out in the Dark	Breaking Glass Pictures	
2014 (25th)	Reaching for the Moon	Wolfe Releasing	
2014 (25th)	Yossi	Strand Releasing	
2015 (26th)	Lilting ‡	Strand Releasing	
2015 (26th)	Dear White People	Lionsgate	
2015 (26th)	Life Partners	Magnolia Pictures	
2015 (26th)	The Way He Looks	Strand Releasing	
2015 (26th)	Will You Still Love Me Tomorrow?	Film Movement	
2016 (27th)	Tangerine ‡	Magnolia Pictures	
2016 (27th)	52 Tuesdays	Kino Lorber	
2016 (27th)	Appropriate Behaviour	Gravitas Ventures	
2016 (27th)	Boy Meets Girl	Wolfe Video	
2016 (27th)	Drunktown's Finest	Nehst Studios	
2017 (28th)	Other People ‡	Amazon Studios / Magnolia Pictures	
2017 (28th)	The Handmaiden	CJ Entertainment	
2017 (28th)	Naz & Maalik	Wolfe Video	
2017 (28th)	Spa Night	Strand Releasing	
2017 (28th)	Those People	Wolfe Video	
2018 (29th)	A Fantastic Woman ‡	Sony Pictures Classics	
2018 (29th)	BPM (Beats per Minute)	The Orchard	
2018 (29th)	God's Own Country	Samuel Goldwyn Films / Orion Pictures	
2018 (29th)	Thelma	The Orchard	
2018 (29th)	The Wound	Kino Lorber	
2019 (30th)	Boy Erased ‡	Focus Features	
2019 (30th)	1985	Wolfe Releasing	
2019 (30th)	Can You Ever Forgive Me?	Fox Searchlight	
2019 (30th)	Disobedience	Bleecker Street	
2019 (30th)	The Favourite	Fox Searchlight	
2019 (30th)	Hearts Beat Loud	Gunpowder & Sky	
2019 (30th)	A Kid Like Jake	IFC Films	
2019 (30th)	The Miseducation of Cameron Post	FilmRise	
2019 (30th)	Saturday Church	Samuel Goldwyn Films	
2019 (30th)	We the Animals	The Orchard	

=== 2020s ===
2020s winners and nominees
Award year	Film	Distributor	Ref(s).
2020 (31st)	Rafiki ‡	Film Movement	
2020 (31st)	Adam	Wolfe Releasing	
2020 (31st)	Brittany Runs a Marathon	Amazon Studios	
2020 (31st)	Canary (Kanarie)	Breaking Glass Pictures	
2020 (31st)	End of the Century	The Cinema Guild	
2020 (31st)	The Heiresses	1844 Entertainment	
2020 (31st)	Pain and Glory	Sony Pictures Classics	
2020 (31st)	Portrait of a Lady on Fire	Neon	
2020 (31st)	Sócrates	Breaking Glass Pictures	
2020 (31st)	This Is Not Berlin	Samuel Goldwyn Films	
2021 (32nd)	The Boys in the Band ‡	Netflix	
2021 (32nd)	Ammonite	Neon	
2021 (32nd)	And Then We Danced	Music Box Films	
2021 (32nd)	The Half of It	Netflix	
2021 (32nd)	I Carry You With Me	Sony Pictures Classics	
2021 (32nd)	Kajillionaire	Focus Features	
2021 (32nd)	The Life Ahead	Netflix	
2021 (32nd)	Lingua Franca	ARRAY / Netflix	
2021 (32nd)	Monsoon	Strand Releasing	
2021 (32nd)	The True Adventures of Wolfboy	Vertical Entertainment	
2022 (33rd)	Parallel Mothers ‡	Sony Pictures Classics	
2022 (33rd)	Breaking Fast	Vertical Entertainment	
2022 (33rd)	Gossamer Folds	Indican Pictures	
2022 (33rd)	The Obituary of Tunde Johnson	Wolfe Video	
2022 (33rd)	Plan B	Hulu	
2022 (33rd)	Port Authority	Momentum Pictures	
2022 (33rd)	Shiva Baby	Utopia	
2022 (33rd)	Swan Song	Magnolia Pictures	
2022 (33rd)	Tu Me Manques	Dark Star Pictures	
2022 (33rd)	Twilight's Kiss	Strand Releasing	
2023 (34th)	The Inspection ‡	A24	
2023 (34th)	Anaïs in Love	Magnolia Pictures	
2023 (34th)	Benediction	Roadside Attractions	
2023 (34th)	Death and Bowling	Wolfe Releasing	
2023 (34th)	Firebird	Roadside Attractions	
2023 (34th)	Girl Picture	Strand Releasing	
2023 (34th)	My Policeman	Prime Video	
2023 (34th)	Neptune Frost	Kino Lorber	
2023 (34th)	The Swimmer	Strand Releasing	
2023 (34th)	Wendell & Wild	Netflix	
2024 (35th)	Monica ‡	IFC Films	
2024 (35th)	Aristotle and Dante Discover the Secrets of the Universe	Blue Fox Entertainment	
2024 (35th)	The Blue Caftan	Strand Releasing	
2024 (35th)	Blue Jean	Magnolia Pictures	
2024 (35th)	How to Blow Up a Pipeline	Neon	
2024 (35th)	Joyland	Oscilloscope	
2024 (35th)	L’immensità	Music Box Films	
2024 (35th)	Our Son	Vertical Entertainment	
2024 (35th)	Passages	Mubi	
2024 (35th)	Summoning Sylvia	The Horror Collective	
2025 (36th)	Crossing ‡	Mubi	
2025 (36th)	20,000 Species of Bees	Film Movement	
2025 (36th)	Backspot	XYZ Films	
2025 (36th)	Before I Change My Mind	Epic Pictures	
2025 (36th)	Big Boys	Dark Star Pictures	
2025 (36th)	Close to You	Greenwich Entertainment	
2025 (36th)	Fitting In	Blue Fox Entertainment	
2025 (36th)	High Tide	Strand Releasing	
2025 (36th)	Housekeeping for Beginners	Focus Features	
2025 (36th)	A Place of Our Own	Dark Star Pictures	
2026 (37th)	A Nice Indian Boy ‡	Blue Harbor Entertainment	
2026 (37th)	Plainclothes ‡	Dark Star Pictures	
2026 (37th)	Cactus Pears	Strand Releasing	
2026 (37th)	Fairyland	Lionsgate/WILLA	
2026 (37th)	Griffin in Summer	Vertical	
2026 (37th)	I Wish You All the Best	Lionsgate	
2026 (37th)	Ponyboi	Fox Entertainment Studios	
2026 (37th)	The Queen of My Dreams	Product of Culture/WILLA	
2026 (37th)	Sorry, Baby	A24	
2026 (37th)	Young Hearts	Strand Releasing	
