= Gregory, Texas =

- City
- Motto: The Pathway to the Future
- Coordinates: 27°55′14″N 97°17′33″W
- Country: United States
- State: Texas
- County: San Patricio
- Established: 1886

Government
  - Type: General Law Type A
  - Mayor: Estella Boyes R.N.
  - Mayor Pro-Tem: David Smith
  - City Council: Angela Sanez-Arrevalo, Aaron Boyes, Dominic Hernandez, George Hernandez, David Smith

Area
  - Total: 1.35 sq mi (3.50 km^{2})
  - Land: 1.35 sq mi (3.50 km^{2})
  - Water: 0 sq mi (0.00 km^{2})
- Elevation: 30 ft (9 m)

Population (2020)
  - Total: 1,740
  - Estimate (2022): 1,731
  - Density: 1,287.6/sq mi (497.14/km^{2})
- Time zone: UTC−6 (Central (CST))
  - Summer (DST): UTC−5 (CDT)
- ZIP Code: 78359
- Area code: 361
- FIPS code: 48-31064
- GNIS feature ID: 1337010
- Website: Official website

Gregory is a city in San Patricio County, Texas, United States. The population was 1,740 at the 2020 census.

== Geography ==
Gregory is located at 27°55′14″N 97°17′33″W (27.920604, –97.292480).

According to the United States Census Bureau, the city has a total area of 1.4 square miles (3.6 km^{2}), all land.

== Demographics ==
Historical population
| Census | Pop. | Note | %± |
|---|---|---|---|
| 1960 | 1,970 | | — |
| 1970 | 2,246 | | 14.0% |
| 1980 | 2,739 | | 22.0% |
| 1990 | 2,458 | | −10.3% |
| 2000 | 2,318 | | −5.7% |
| 2010 | 1,907 | | −17.7% |
| 2020 | 1,740 | | −8.8% |
| 2022 (est.) | 1,731 | | −0.5% |
U.S. Decennial Census

=== 2020 census ===
As of the 2020 census, Gregory had a population of 1,740. The median age was 39.3 years, 27.0% of residents were under the age of 18, and 17.8% of residents were 65 years of age or older. There were 92.5 males for every 100 females and 90.6 males for every 100 females age 18 and over.

90.1% of residents lived in urban areas, while 9.9% lived in rural areas.

There were 573 households in Gregory, of which 40.0% had children under the age of 18 living in them. Of all households, 46.1% were married-couple households, 18.2% were households with a male householder and no spouse or partner present, and 31.9% were households with a female householder and no spouse or partner present. About 18.4% of all households were made up of individuals and 9.5% had someone living alone who was 65 years of age or older.

There were 656 housing units, of which 12.7% were vacant. The homeowner vacancy rate was 2.2% and the rental vacancy rate was 9.2%.

Racial composition as of the 2020 census
| Race | Number | Percent |
|---|---|---|
| White | 654 | 37.6% |
| Black or African American | 12 | 0.7% |
| American Indian and Alaska Native | 12 | 0.7% |
| Asian | 5 | 0.3% |
| Native Hawaiian and Other Pacific Islander | 4 | 0.2% |
| Some other race | 420 | 24.1% |
| Two or more races | 633 | 36.4% |
| Hispanic or Latino (of any race) | 1,561 | 89.7% |

=== 2000 census ===
As of the census of 2000, there were 2,318 people, 658 households, and 561 families residing in the city. The population density was 1,636.8 inhabitants per square mile (632.0/km^{2}). There were 743 housing units at an average density of 524.6 per square mile (202.5/km^{2}). The racial makeup of the city was 70.10% White, 0.60% African American, 0.65% Native American, 0.09% Asian, 0.04% Pacific Islander, 25.37% from other races, and 3.15% from two or more races. Hispanic or Latino of any race were 94.65% of the population.

There were 658 households, out of which 43.6% had children under the age of 18 living with them, 61.1% were married couples living together, 16.3% had a female householder with no husband present, and 14.6% were non-families. 13.7% of all households were made up of individuals, and 5.2% had someone living alone who was 65 years of age or older. The average household size was 3.52 and the average family size was 3.85.

In the city, the population was spread out, with 33.4% under the age of 18, 10.6% from 18 to 24, 26.0% from 25 to 44, 20.2% from 45 to 64, and 9.8% who were 65 years of age or older. The median age was 30 years. For every 100 females, there were 97.4 males. For every 100 females age 18 and over, there were 93.1 males.

The median income for a household in the city was $31,250, and the median income for a family was $33,750. Males had a median income of $29,375 versus $16,226 for females. The per capita income for the city was $10,752. About 16.8% of families and 18.7% of the population were below the poverty line, including 23.1% of those under age 18 and 20.3% of those age 65 or over.

== Education ==
Gregory-Portland High School

Gregory is served by the Gregory-Portland Independent School District.

Stephen F. Austin Elementary School (PK–5) is in Gregory. A new elementary school was built for the 2007–2008 school year.

Gregory-Portland Intermediate School (6), Gregory-Portland Junior High School (7–8), and Gregory-Portland High School (9–12) in nearby Portland also serves Gregory.

Del Mar College is the designated community college for all of San Patricio County.

== Media ==
The 1981 film Raggedy Man, starring Sissy Spacek, was set in Gregory in 1944. She played the town's telephone operator.

== Historic facts ==
Gregory once had a high school named Gregory High School that schooled residents of Gregory and Portland. Later, it was moved to Portland, named Gregory-Portland High School and remains there to the present day.
