= Swan Song (2021 Todd Stephens film) =

- Theatrical release poster
- Directed by: Todd Stephens
- Written by: Todd Stephens
- Produced by: Todd Stephens; Eric Eisenbrey; Tim Kaltenecker; Rhet Topham; Stephen Israel
- Starring: Udo Kier; Jennifer Coolidge; Linda Evans; Michael Urie; Ira Hawkins; Stephanie McVay
- Cinematography: Jackson Warner Lewis
- Edited by: Spencer Schilly; Santiago Figueira W.
- Music by: Chris Stephens
- Production companies: Luna Pictures; House of Gemini; XYZ Films
- Distributed by: Magnolia Pictures
- Release dates: March 17, 2021 (SXSW); August 6, 2021 (United States)
- Running time: 105 minutes
- Country: United States
- Language: English
- Box office: $177,903

Swan Song is a 2021 American drama film, written, directed, and produced by Todd Stephens. It stars Udo Kier, Jennifer Coolidge, Linda Evans, Michael Urie, Ira Hawkins, and Stephanie McVay.

The film premiered at South by Southwest on March 17, 2021. It premiered in a limited release on August 6, 2021, prior to video on demand by Magnolia Pictures on August 13, 2021.

== Plot ==
Retired hairdresser Pat Pitsenbarger, once renowned as the "Liberace of Sandusky", takes a long walk to style his former client's hair for her funeral.

== Cast ==
- Udo Kier as Pat Pitsenbarger
- Jennifer Coolidge as Dee Dee Dale
- Linda Evans as Rita Parker Sloan
- Michael Urie as Dustin
- Ira Hawkins as Eunice
- Stephanie McVay as Sue
- Tom Bloom as Walter Shanrock
- Justin Lonesome as Miss Velma
- Thom Hilton as Gabriel
- Shanessa Sweeney as Ro Ro
- Bryant Carroll as Lyle
- Shelby Garrett as Evie
- Catherine Albers as Janie
- Dave Sorboro as Josiah
- Roshon Thomas as Shaundell
- Annie Kitral as Miss Gertie
- Eric Eisenbrey as David
- Jonah Blechman as Tristan
- Tim Murray as Nurse
- Cheryl Talley-Sharp as Phyllis
- Ray Perrin as Scottie
- P.M. Schreiter as Viviana Celeste

== Release ==
The film had its world premiere at South by Southwest on March 17, 2021. Prior to, Magnolia Pictures acquired worldwide distribution rights to the film. It was released in a limited release on August 6, 2021, prior to video on demand on August 13, 2021.

== Reception ==
=== Critical response ===
Swan Song received positive reviews from film critics. On the review aggregator website Rotten Tomatoes, 92% of 102 critics' reviews are positive, with an average rating of 7.3/10. The website's consensus reads: "Udo Kier's layered performance lends Swan Song a nuance and poignancy that offset its potentially outlandish story." On Metacritic, the film holds a rating of 65 out of 100, based on 26 critics, indicating "generally favorable reviews".

=== Accolades ===
On December 14, 2021, Udo Kier was nominated for an Independent Spirit Award for Best Male Lead and Stephens for an Independent Spirit Award for Best Screenplay. On January 21, 2022, the film itself was nominated for a GLAAD Media Award for Outstanding Film – Limited Release.

Year	Award	Category	Recipient(s)	Result	Ref.
2022	Independent Spirit Awards	Best Male Lead	Udo Kier	Nominated	
2022	Independent Spirit Awards	Best Screenplay	Todd Stephens	Nominated	
2022	GLAAD Media Awards	Outstanding Film – Limited Release	Swan Song	Nominated	
