= Shelter (2007 film) =

2007 film

- Directed by: Jonah Markowitz
- Written by: Jonah Markowitz
- Produced by: J. D. Disalvatore
- Starring: Trevor Wright; Brad Rowe; Tina Holmes; Ross Thomas
- Cinematography: Joseph White
- Edited by: Michael Hofacre
- Music by: J. Peter Robinson
- Distributed by: here! Films; Regent Releasing (US)
- Release dates: June 16, 2007 (Frameline Film Festival); March 21, 2008 (United States)
- Running time: 88 minutes
- Country: United States
- Language: English
- Budget: $500,000
- Box office: $142,666

Shelter is a 2007 American romantic drama film produced by JD Disalvatore and directed and written by Jonah Markowitz. It stars Trevor Wright, Brad Rowe, and Tina Holmes. It was the winner of "Outstanding Film–Limited Release" at the 2009 GLAAD Media Awards, Best New Director and Favorite Narrative Feature at the Seattle Lesbian & Gay Film Festival, and the People's Choice Award for Best Feature at the Vancouver Queer Film Festival. Shelter represents the feature directorial debut of Markowitz.

== Plot ==
Zach is an aspiring young artist living in San Pedro, California. He has put off his dreams of going to art school in order to work and help his older sister Jeanne, his disabled father, and his five-year-old nephew Cody, whom he cares for most of the time, as Jeanne spends her time partying. Working as a short-order cook to make ends meet, Zach uses his free time to paint, surf, and hang out with his on/off girlfriend Tori and his best friend Gabe.

When Gabe's older brother Shaun comes back home from Los Angeles for a few weeks, Zach and Shaun develop a close friendship as they go surfing together. Shaun, a published writer, encourages Zach to take control of his life and pursue his ambition of going to CalArts. One night after drinking, Shaun kisses Zach. However, Zach is not prepared to give in to his feelings immediately and struggles with whether or not he may be gay. After Zach breaks up with Tori, he goes to Shaun's house, and the two sleep together. Following this, Jeanne reveals she and her boyfriend Alan are heading to Portland for his job interview, forcing Zach to look after Cody. Zach is reluctant, but agrees. When Shaun invites him over, he tells him to bring Cody along and the three have a great time together. Zach and Shaun's relationship begins to blossom, while Shaun builds a strong bond with Cody.

Zach feels uncomfortable when both Gabe and Jeanne learn about his relationship with Shaun. Although Gabe is supportive, Jeanne reveals her homophobic opinions and tells Zach that she does not want Cody hanging around Shaun due to his sexuality. At a party later that night, Zach becomes conflicted and ends things with Shaun, reasoning that he is not like him. Shaun tells him that it is obvious what he wants and calls him a coward for being too afraid to deal with his feelings.

Shaun secretly submits Zach's art school application on his behalf. Zach gets a call from CalArts telling him that they have received Zach's portfolio and application. Meanwhile, Jeanne reveals that Alan got a job in Portland, and reveals her plan to move to Oregon with him permanently without Cody. Zach is accepted to CalArts and is made to decide between putting himself first and neglecting his own dreams for his family. Zach meets with Tori, who urges him to decide for himself whether he wants to go to CalArts or stay to take care of Cody. After staying overnight at Tori's to avoid facing Jeanne, Zach decides to move forward with his art career. He sees Shaun to apologize for ending things and confesses that he had been accepted into the school in the past, but put it off to look after his family after his mother died. Now determined to chase his dreams, he re-affirms his love for Shaun and the two reconcile, making plans to move in together near CalArts.

Zach then goes to see Jeanne who's preparing to leave with Alan. Zach walks up to her, hand in hand with Shaun, and issues Jeanne an ultimatum, saying if she wants to abandon Cody, she would have to accept that Cody would be living with him and Shaun. A fight breaks out; Zach reassures Jeanne that Cody will be in good hands with Shaun. She relents, accepting what is truly best for Cody, and leaves him in the care of Zach and Shaun as she goes off to Portland with Alan.

The film ends with Zach, Shaun and Cody happily playing on the beach together as a family.

== Cast ==
- Trevor Wright as Zach
- Brad Rowe as Shaun
- Tina Holmes as Jeanne
- Jackson Wurth as Cody
- Ross Thomas as Gabe
- Katie Walder as Tori
- Albert Reed as Billy
- Joy Gohring as Ellen
- Matt Bushell as Alan
- Caitlin Crosby as Shari
- Raquel Justin as blue

== Production ==
Shelter was filmed in 21 days, primarily in San Pedro and Laguna Beach, California, with additional filming in Bel Air and Malibu. A visual focal point throughout the film is the Vincent Thomas Bridge in Port of LA.

The artwork depicted in the film was the work of LA artist Ryan Graeff, whose street art appears across the area and is profiled on his blog, Restitution Press.

The motion picture soundtrack features original music by singer-songwriter Shane McAnally (credited to Shane Mack).

== Release ==
Shelter debuted at the 31st Frameline Film Festival in San Francisco on June 16, 2007.

== Soundtrack ==
The soundtrack album, Shelter: Music from the Motion Picture, was released in 2008.

1. "Goin' Home" (written and performed by Bill Ferguson)
2. "I Like That" (written and performed by Shane Mack)
3. "No Way Home" (written and performed by Matt Pavolaitis and Brett Cookingham)
4. "Pirate Sounds" (written by Ariel Rechtshald, Josh Kessler, Marc Ferrari, and Lewis Pesacov, performed by Matthew Popieluch)
5. "Teenage Romanticide" (written by Jen Mitz, Nina Martinez, and Susan Gale, performed by Dance Yourself to Death)
6. "Look for Love" (written and performed by Tony Valenzuela)
7. "Darkness Descends" (written by Ariel Rechtshald, Josh Kessler, Marc Ferrari, and Lewis Pesacov, performed by Matthew Popieluch)
8. "Vaporizer" (written and performed by Nicholas Viterelli)
9. "What Do You Believe In" (written by Jeffrey S. Haycock; arranged by Christopher J Welsh & Scott "SkooB" Wilson; performed by The Vengers)
10. "Trying" (written by Ariel Rechtshald, Josh Kessler, and Matthew Popieluch, performed by Matthew Popieluch)
11. "Gimmie Clam" (written and performed by Nicholas Viterelli)
12. "Break" (written and performed by Shane Mack)
13. "Reflection" (written and performed by Todd Hannigan)
14. "Lie to Me" (written and performed by Shane Mack)
15. "Time to Time" (written by Stewart Lewis and Reed Foehl, performed by Stewart Lewis)
16. "More Than This" (written and performed by Shane Mack)
17. "Long Way Home" (written and performed by Shane Mack)
18. "Remember to Forget" (written and performed by Shane Mack)
19. "Cool of Morning" (written and performed by Matt Pavolaitis and Brett Cookingham)

== Critical reception ==
On Metacritic, the film holds a score of 66 based on 11 reviews, indicating "generally favorable reviews".

On Rotten Tomatoes, as of September 2026 the movie has a 58% Tomatometer and 85% popcornmeter.

As of 2015, Shelter has been in the top three on Logo's NewNowNext's yearly reader poll "The Top 100 Greatest Gay Movies" for seven straight years and has been #1 twice. Sid Smith from the Chicago Tribune said that Shelter '"captures the beauty, thrill and ache of young love and extracts a casual joy out of the process." Entertainment Weekly gave the film a B+ rating, and Out Magazine called it "an instant classic". The Seattle Times writes, "What could have been a standard-issue coming-out, coming-of-age movie develops a remarkable intimacy. It’s a star-making, multilayered role, and Wright makes it his own. He connects with the character’s passion and mischief, as well as his secretive and sometimes cowardly side."

Albert Williams from the Chicago Reader wrote “What might have been a routine coming-out story is enriched by Trevor Wright‘s accomplished and honest performance, Jonah Markowitz’s straightforward dialogue, and Joseph White’s cinematography of the majestic surf and melancholy sunsets off Malibu.” Elizabeth Weitzman from the New York Daily News wrote “Actors Trevor Wright and Brad Rowe are good enough to turn a formulaic coming-out tale into a sweet romance.”

In praise of the film, David Weigand from the San Francisco Chronicle singled out "a superb performance by Trevor Wright in the lead role, a strong supporting cast, very good cinematography and, most of all, emotional authenticity", noting in particular Trevor Wright's "restrained and delicately balanced performance" as "the beating heart of the film from the start".

== Awards ==
- GLAAD Media Award – Won, Outstanding Film – Limited Release, 2009.
- Seattle Lesbian & Gay Film Festival – Won, Best New Director (Jonah Markowitz), 2007.
- Seattle Lesbian & Gay Film Festival – Won, Favorite Narrative Feature, 2007.
- Vancouver Queer Film Festival – Won, People's Choice Award for Best Feature, 2007.
- Tampa International Gay & Lesbian Film Festival – Won, Best Actor (Trevor Wright), 2007.
- Tampa Gay & Lesbian Film Festival – Won, Audience Award for Best Cinematography (Joseph White), 2007.
- Philadelphia International Gay & Lesbian Film Festival – Won, Special Award for first-time director (Jonah Markowitz), 2007.
- Dallas OUT TAKES – Won, Best Film, 2007.
- Outfest – Won, HBO Outstanding First Dramatic Feature (Jonah Markowitz), 2007.
- Melbourne Queer Film Festival – Won, Audience Choice Award for Best Feature, 2007.

== See also ==
- List of lesbian, gay, bisexual, or transgender-related films by storyline
