= Tradewinds, Texas =

- CDP
- Coordinates: 27°59′31″N 97°15′43″W
- Country: United States
- State: Texas
- County: San Patricio

Area
  - Total: 1.1 sq mi (2.8 km^{2})
  - Land: 1.1 sq mi (2.8 km^{2})
  - Water: 0 sq mi (0.0 km^{2})
- Elevation: 20 ft (6 m)

Population (2020)
  - Total: 160
  - Density: 150/sq mi (57/km^{2})
- Time zone: UTC-6 (Central (CST))
  - Summer (DST): UTC-5 (CDT)
- Zip Code: 78390
- FIPS code: 48-73526
- GNIS feature ID: 1852774

Tradewinds is a census-designated place (CDP) in San Patricio County, Texas, United States. The population was 160 at the 2020 census.

== Geography ==
Tradewinds is located at 27°59′31″N 97°15′43″W (27.992077, -97.261811).

According to the United States Census Bureau, the CDP has a total area of 1.1 square miles (2.8 km^{2}), all land.

== Demographics ==
Historical population
Census	Pop.	Note	%±
2000	163		—
2010	180		10.4%
2020	160		−11.1%
U.S. Decennial Census; 1850–1900 1910; 1920 1930 1940; 1950 1960 1970; 1980 1990 2000; 2010 2020

Tradewinds first appeared as a census designated place in the 2000 U.S. census.

=== 2020 census ===
Tradewinds CDP, Texas – Racial and ethnic composition Note: the US Census treats Hispanic/Latino as an ethnic category. This table excludes Latinos from the racial categories and assigns them to a separate category. Hispanics/Latinos may be of any race.
Race / Ethnicity (NH = Non-Hispanic)	Pop 2000	Pop 2010	Pop 2020	% 2000	% 2010	% 2020
White alone (NH)	36	32	31	22.09%	17.78%	19.38%
Black or African American alone (NH)	0	0	0	0.00%	0.00%	0.00%
Native American or Alaska Native alone (NH)	0	0	0	0.00%	0.00%	0.00%
Asian alone (NH)	0	0	0	0.00%	0.00%	0.00%
Native Hawaiian or Pacific Islander alone (NH)	0	0	0	0.00%	0.00%	0.00%
Other race alone (NH)	0	0	0	0.00%	0.00%	0.00%
Mixed race or Multiracial (NH)	1	0	1	0.61%	0.00%	0.63%
Hispanic or Latino (any race)	126	148	128	77.30%	82.22%	80.00%
Total	163	180	160	100.00%	100.00%	100.00%

=== 2000 census ===
As of the census of 2000, there were 163 people, 43 households, and 36 families residing in the CDP. The population density was 151.1 inhabitants per square mile (58.3/km^{2}). There were 54 housing units at an average density of 50.1 per square mile (19.3/km^{2}). The racial makeup of the CDP was 89.57% White, 9.20% from other races, and 1.23% from two or more races. Hispanic or Latino of any race were 77.30% of the population.

There were 43 households, out of which 62.8% had children under the age of 18 living with them, 65.1% were married couples living together, 11.6% had a female householder with no husband present, and 14.0% were non-families. 9.3% of all households were made up of individuals, and 7.0% had someone living alone who was 65 years of age or older. The average household size was 3.79 and the average family size was 3.95.

In the CDP, the population was spread out, with 44.2% under the age of 18, 11.0% from 18 to 24, 29.4% from 25 to 44, 11.0% from 45 to 64, and 4.3% who were 65 years of age or older. The median age was 22 years. For every 100 females, there were 101.2 males. For every 100 females age 18 and over, there were 82.0 males.

The median income for a household in the CDP was $17,250, and the median income for a family was $17,250. Males had a median income of $16,250 versus $12,500 for females. The per capita income for the CDP was $4,962. About 51.0% of families and 61.3% of the population were below the poverty line, including 69.5% of those under the age of 18 and none of those 65 or over.

== Education ==
Gregory-Portland High School

Tradewinds is served by the Gregory-Portland Independent School District. It operates Gregory-Portland High School.

Del Mar College is the designated community college for all of San Patricio County.
