= Andersen Gabrych =

Writer

- Born: Tokyo, Japan
- Occupations: Comics Writer, Actor, Writer
- Years active: 1998 – present

Andersen Gabrych (/ˈɡæbrɪk/) is an American comics writer, director, and actor.

== Early life ==
Gabrych grew up in Chico, California. He has been a fan of comics since childhood, having read an issue of Justice League of America at the age of 7.

== Career ==
As an actor, Gabrych has appeared in Edge of Seventeen, Boys Life 4: Four Play, Gypsy 83, Hit and Runway, Another Gay Movie and its sequel. Off-Broadway, he has appeared in productions at The Public Theater, New York Theatre Workshop, Ensemble Studio Theater, Westbeth Theatre Center and Here!. With Maggie Rowe he is the award‑winning co‑writer, director, and actor of Bright Day! a mockumentary satire of Hollywood's cult-like prosperity theologies. It stars and has cameos by major celebrities (Bill Maher, Michael Cera, Richard Belzer, et al.) Gabrych wrote and performed three one‑man shows and has directed the one‑woman show "Tied Up in Knotts" for stand-up comic and SAG/AFTRA actor Karen Knotts, a story of growing up with her comedian father.

As a writer, Gabrych has contributed to a number of Batman-related titles for DC Comics and wrote the second volume of Omega Men.

== Filmography ==
| Year | Title | Role | Notes |
|---|---|---|---|
| 1998 | Edge of Seventeen | Rod | |
| 1999 | Hit and Runway | Gay Bartender | Credited as Anderson Gabrych |
| 2000 | Law & Order | Kenny Davidson | Episode "Surrender Dorothy" |
| 2000 | The Sopranos | UTA Receptionist | Episode "D-Girl" |
| 2001 | Gypsy 83 | Banning | |
| 2002 | Bumping Heads | Gary | Short film |
| 2003 | Boys Life 4: Four Play | Gary | Segment "Bumping Heads" |
| 2003 | The Look | Tom | |
| 2006 | Another Gay Movie | Tyler | |
| 2008 | Another Gay Sequel: Gays Gone Wild! | Rod the Wino Queen | |
| 2010 | Bright Day! | Reverend Doctor Coyote | Co-director & co-writer |

== Bibliography ==
To date, the entirety of Gabrych's work has been published by DC Comics:

- Batgirl #38: "Testline" (with Jeff Parker, 2003)
- Detective Comics (with Pete Woods and Brad Walker (co-features in #795–796), 2004–2005) collected as:
  - Batman: War Games Book One (includes #790–797, tpb, 464 pages, 2015, ISBN 1-401-25813-1)
  - Batman: War Games Book Two (includes #798–800 and 809–810, tpb, 632 pages, 2016, ISBN 1-401-26070-5)
    - Also collects Batman #634 (written by Gabrych, art by Paul Lee, 2005) as part of the "War Games" inter-title crossover.
    - Also collects Batman #642 (written by Gabrych, art by Chris Marrinan, 2005) as part of the "War Crimes" inter-title crossover.
- Batgirl (with Alé Garza, Pop Mhan, Andy Kuhn (#66) and Francisco Rodriguez de la Fuente (#72), 2005–2006) collected as:
  - Robin/Batgirl: Fresh Blood (includes #58–59, tpb, 96 pages, 2005, ISBN 1-4012-0433-3)
  - Kicking Assassins (collects #60–64, tpb, 128 pages, 2006, ISBN 1-4012-0439-2)
  - Destruction's Daughter (collects #65–73, tpb, 224 pages, 2006, ISBN 1-4012-0896-7)
- Batman Allies Secret Files & Origins 2005: "Taking Sides" (with Tom Derenick, co-feature, 2005)
- Catwoman vol. 3 #43: "Pest Control" (with Rick Burchett, 2005) collected in Catwoman: The One You Love (tpb, 240 pages, 2015, ISBN 1-4012-5832-8)
- Detective Comics #808–810: "The Beast Beneath" (with Tommy Castillo, co-feature, 2005) collected in Batman Arkham: Killer Croc (tpb, 296 pages, 2016, ISBN 1-4012-6345-3)
- Omega Men vol. 2 #1–6 (with Henry Flint, 2006–2007)
- Vertigo Crime: Fogtown (with Brad Rader, graphic novel, hc, 176 pages, 2010, ISBN 1-40121-384-7; sc, 2011, ISBN 1-4012-2950-6)

| Preceded by Ed Brubaker | Detective Comics writer 2004–2005 | Succeeded by David Lapham |
| Preceded by Dylan Horrocks | Batgirl writer 2005–2006 | Succeeded by Adam Beechen |
