= Walker Janek =

American baseball player (born 2002)

Houston Astros
- Catcher
- Born: September 24, 2002 (age 23); Portland, Texas, U.S.
- Bats: Right Throws: Right

Career highlights and awards
- Buster Posey Award (2024)

Walker Payne Janek (born September 24, 2002) is an American professional baseball catcher in the Houston Astros organization. Janek was selected as the 28th pick in the first round of the 2024 MLB draft for the Houston Astros.

== Amateur career ==
Janek grew up in Portland, Texas and attended Gregory-Portland High School. Janek committed to play college baseball at Sam Houston State University.

Janek batted .308 with seven home runs and 33 RBI during his freshman season with the Sam Houston Bearkats. As a sophomore he hit .301 with 17 doubles, 13 home runs, and 65 RBI. Janek was named the Most Outstanding Player of the 2023 Western Athletic Conference baseball tournament. After the season, Janek played summer collegiate baseball for the Falmouth Commodores of the Cape Cod Baseball League. In 2024, Janek won the Buster Posey Award. Over 58 games as a junior, he batted .364 with 17 home runs and 58 RBI.

== Professional career ==
Janek was selected by the Houston Astros in the first round with the 28th overall pick in the 2024 Major League Baseball draft. On July 26, 2024, Janek signed with the Astros on a $3.1 million contract.

Janek was assigned to the Asheville Tourists of the High-A South Atlantic League to begin his professional career. Over 25 games, he hit .175 with one home run and 11 RBIs. He returned to Asheville for the 2025 season. Across 92 games, Janek batted .263 with 12 home runs and 46 RBI. He opened the 2026 season with the Corpus Christi Hooks. In May, he was placed on the injured list with a lower-body injury.
