= Re-Flex =

English new wave band (1981–1985)

- Origin: Birmingham, England
- Genres: New wave; synth-pop
- Years active: 1981–1987
- Labels: EMI; Capitol; One Day
- Past members: John Baxter; Paul Fishman; François Craig; John Hodges; Phil Gould; Mark King; Roland Vaughn Kerridge; Nigel Ross-Scott
- Website: re-flex.com

Re-Flex were an English new wave band formed in London in 1979. They are most notable for their hit "The Politics of Dancing", the title track from their debut studio album released in 1983. The band stopped actively working together in 1985, but occasionally collaborated on individual members' solo projects in the years following.

== History ==
=== Formation and early years (1981–1982) ===
Re-Flex were formed in 1981 by musicians John Baxter on vocals and lead guitar and Paul Fishman on keyboards and backing vocals. The band's earliest line-ups also included François Craig on bass and vocals, John Hodges on guitar, and two successive drummers: Phil Gould and Mark King, who would both go on to form jazz-funk band Level 42. Following King's exit, Roland Vaughn Kerridge took over on drums. Later, after Craig's departure, musician Thomas Dolby introduced the band to ex-Gloria Mundi bass player Nigel Ross-Scott, as he had previously worked with him in the post-punk band Bruce Woolley & The Camera Club, alongside Bruce Woolley and Dave Birch. Hodges departed at some point before their first album was recorded and his vacancy was not filled, thus making the band a 4-piece. Re-Flex's final and best-known line-up consisted of Baxter, Fishman, Kerridge and Ross-Scott.

=== International success (1983–1984) ===
In late 1982, the band recorded their debut album, The Politics of Dancing, which was released in November 1983 by EMI Records. The album, produced by John Punter of Roxy Music fame, was a moderate success, peaking at No. 53 in the United States, No. 58 in Germany and No. 34 in New Zealand. It was later re-released in 1993, in CD format for the first time, by One Way Records.

The album's title track, released as a single in late 1983, was met with much greater success, and became a big international hit in 1984, reaching the top 40 (and in some cases the top 20) in numerous countries: No. 24 in the United States and No. 8 on the U.S. dance chart, No. 28 in the UK (with a chart run of 9 weeks), No. 9 in Canada (with a chart run of 9 weeks in the Canadian top 30), No. 25 in West Germany, No. 11 in Australia, No. 12 in New Zealand, and was also a success in Switzerland, South Africa, Israel, the Netherlands, Spain, and Italy. Five other singles were released from the album and achieved various international success. The band toured Europe and the United States, where, on their first visit, they supported the Police.

"The Politics of Dancing" was featured in the 1998 film Edge of Seventeen and can also be found on numerous compilation albums of 1980s hit singles. It also appeared in the trailer and film Atomic Blonde, starring Charlize Theron (2017). Re-Flex also recorded the song "Cut It" for the soundtrack to the 1984 film Breakin' which was released by Polydor Records.

=== Humanication and hiatus (1985–1987) ===
Recorded in late 1984 and planned for a release in February 1985, Humanication was to be Re-Flex's follow-up album. The only single released from the album, "How Much Longer" (a minor hit in Germany), on the topic of environmentalism, featured Sting on backing vocals. Despite positive response, the record was pulled by EMI and deemed too political by the US company. Soon after, the band left EMI. Demo versions of the Humanication album were leaked out, although it would not be officially released for another 25 years.

In spite of the turmoil, Re-Flex continued to record together, working on a new project entitled Jamming the Broadcast. During this period, the band also recorded two tracks, "Life's Too Dangerous" and "Revolution Now," for the soundtrack to the 1987 film Superman IV. After recording was completed, the group ceased actively working together, but never officially disbanded.

=== Recent events (2010–present) ===
In mid-September 2010, Re-Flex released a six CD box set put together by Paul Fishman, in conjunction with Roland Vaughn Kerridge, entitled Re-Fuse. The set included a remastered version of The Politics of Dancing and five CDs of other previously unreleased material (including the Humanication and Jamming the Broadcast albums in their entirety) which pre- and post-dates Politics.

Fishman and Kerridge's remastering of the band's back catalogue culminated on 18 September 2010 launch of a website entitled Connect to promote these new releases. The website was developed by Paul Fishman's company, PFL-UK, and has been designed around an infinite 3D environment.

According to a September 2012 interview with Paul Fishman, drummer Roland Vaughn Kerridge died in February of that year after undergoing three rounds of surgery for a brain tumor. Kerridge was able to record one final song in a brief reformation of the classic Re-Flex lineup (minus bassist Nigel Ross-Scott) prior to his death. Fishman states that the band intends to release this final track, "Vibrate Generate" as a single and the title track of a new compilation album.

On 23 May 2022, Paul Fishman announced through Re-Flex's various social media platforms that the band's long-anticipated final track with Kerridge, "Vibrate Generate", would be released in June, both as a digital single and as part of a double-CD album of the same title. The single became available for download through all major online digital music platforms on 17 June 2022. The double-CD became available through the Cherry Red Records website on 24 June 2022. It is a compilation of re-mixes of previously released tracks and new material. The band has also produced a music video for the single "Vibrate Generate", featuring Baxter, Fishman, bassist François Craig from the early line-up, and James Kerridge – son of the band's late drummer – who is a musician in his own right, and, as Fishman stated, “with a little help from our friends”.

== Discography ==
=== Studio albums ===
Year	Album details	Peak chart positions							
Year	Album details	UK	US	AUS	CAN	GER	NL	NZ	SWE
1983	The Politics of Dancing: Released: November 1983 (reissued 18 September 2010); Label: EMI, Capitol Records, One Way Records (CD reissue, 1993); Formats: LP, cassette, CD	—	53	77	—	58	—	34	—
1985	Humanication: Released: (originally planned for February 1985) 18 September 2010; Label: EMI, Capitol Records, Jambo Music; Formats: LP, cassette, CD	—	—	—	—	—	—	—	—
2010	Movement of the Action-Fraction: Released: 18 September 2010; Label: Jambo Music; Formats: CD	—	—	—	—	—	—	—	—
2010	Music Re-Action: Released: 18 September 2010; Label: Jambo Music; Formats: CD	—	—	—	—	—	—	—	—
2010	Jamming the Broadcast: Released: (recorded in 1986–1987) 18 September 2010; Label: Jambo Music; Formats: CD	—	—	—	—	—	—	—	—
2010	Re-Fuse (Box Set): Released: 18 September 2010 (includes Movement of the Action-Fraction, The Politics of Dancing, Humanication, Music Re-Action, Jamming the Broadcast and the exclusive Re-Fuse CD); Label: Jambo Music; Formats: CD	—	—	—	—	—	—	—	—
2022	Vibrate Generate: Released: 24 June 2022 (is a remixed album from their career, include various rare and unreleased tracks); Label: Cherry Red Records - Jambo Music; Formats: CD, digital download	—	—	—	—	—	—	—	—

=== Singles ===
Year	Single	Peak chart positions										Album
Year	Single	UK	US	US Dance	AUS	GER	SWI	SA	NL	NZ	CAN	Album
1983	"The Politics of Dancing"	28	24	8	12	25	28	19	43	12	9	The Politics of Dancing
1983	"Hitline"	—	—	—	—	—	—	—	—	—	—	The Politics of Dancing
1983	"Hurt"	—	82	—	—	—	—	—	—	—	—	The Politics of Dancing
1984	"Praying to the Beat"	95	—	—	—	—	—	—	—	50	—	The Politics of Dancing
1984	"Couldn't Stand a Day"	97	—	—	—	—	—	—	—	—	—	The Politics of Dancing
1984	"Sensitive"	—	—	—	—	—	—	—	—	—	—	The Politics of Dancing
1985	"How Much Longer"	—	—	—	—	59	—	—	—	—	—	Humanication

== See also ==
- List of new wave artists
- List of performers on Top of the Pops
