= Udo Kier =

German actor (1944–2025)

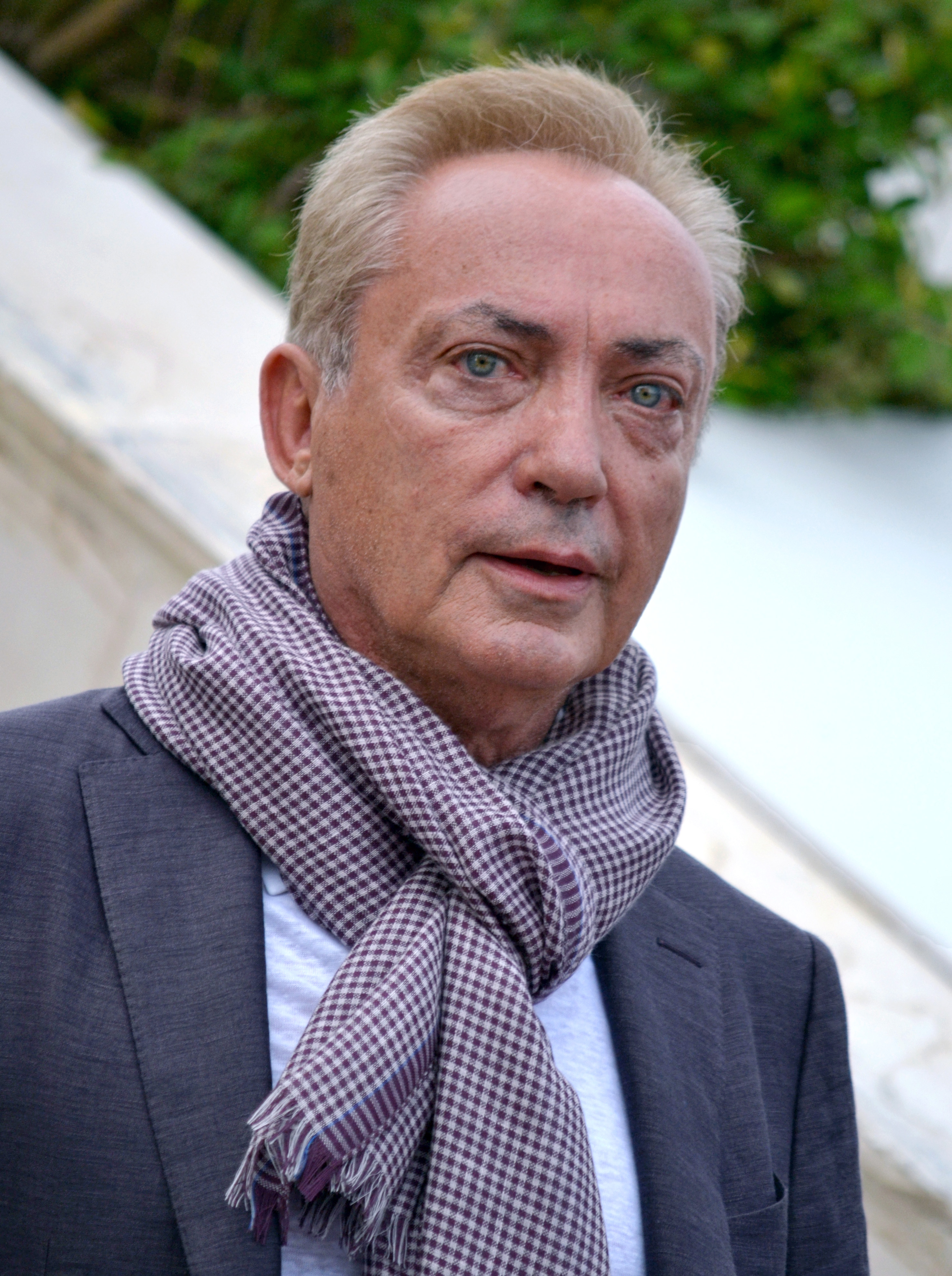
- Kier in 2011
- Born: Udo Kierspe; 14 October 1944; Cologne, Germany
- Died: 23 November 2025 (aged 81); Rancho Mirage, California, U.S.
- Occupation: Actor
- Years active: 1966–2025
- Partner: Delbert McBride

Udo Kierspe (14 October 1944 – 23 November 2025), known professionally as Udo Kier, was a German actor. Known primarily as a character actor who often portrayed eccentric and deviant figures, he appeared in more than 200 films in both leading and supporting roles throughout Europe and the Americas.

Kier made his breakthrough playing the title characters in the cult films Flesh for Frankenstein (1973) and Blood for Dracula (1974), both directed by Paul Morrissey, which established him as an icon of the horror film genre. He became a staple figure in both mainstream genre film and art house circles, described by one obituary as a "cult icon". He collaborated with notable filmmakers, such as Rainer Werner Fassbinder, Lars von Trier, Gus Van Sant, Werner Herzog, Walerian Borowczyk, Kleber Mendonça Filho, Dario Argento, Guy Maddin, Wim Wenders, and Rob Zombie.

He received several international accolades, including a nomination for the Independent Spirit Award for Best Male Lead, for his elegiac performance in Swan Song (2021). Openly gay throughout his career, he received a Special Teddy Award at the 65th Berlin International Film Festival for his contribution to queer cinema.

== Life and career ==
=== Early years ===
Kier was born in Cologne on 14 October 1944. He claimed the hospital where he was born was demolished shortly after his birth as part of the Allied bombing of Cologne during World War II, and he and his mother were rescued from the rubble. Kier grew up without a father. In his youth, he was an altar boy and chorister, and began working as a fashion model as a teenager. He cited Caterina Valente as an influence. At age 16, he met and befriended Rainer Werner Fassbinder, whom he would later work with on several films.

At 19, Kier moved to London to study acting and English, and supported himself by working as a waiter. He also took spells in Cannes, where he befriended Jean Marais and Arndt von Bohlen und Halbach; Rome, where he modelled; and New York City.

=== Acting career ===
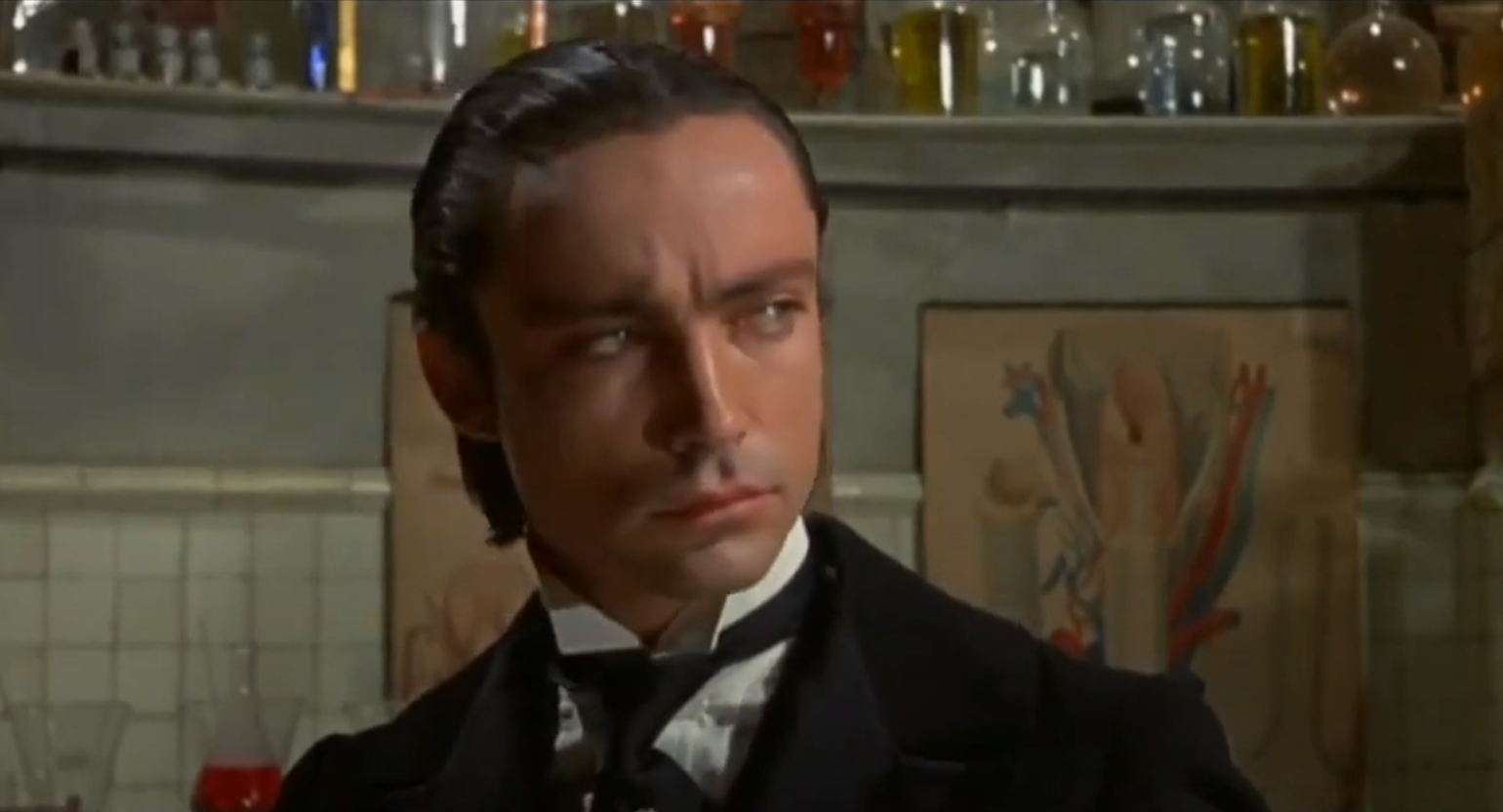
Kier in Flesh for Frankenstein (1973)

Kier made his film debut aged 21 in Road to Saint Tropez, a 1966 short film by British director Michael Sarne. He made his feature film debut in Schamlos ("Shameless"), a 1968 low-budget West German/Austrian crime film. This was followed by a lead role in the West German-Austrian horror film Mark of the Devil (1970), which proved controversial for its graphic violence, but was a commercial success that increased Kier's mainstream recognition.

Another early starring role as the title character in Paul Morrissey's Flesh for Frankenstein (1973) led to a string of art-house, low-budget, and mainstream horror films. He played Dracula in Morrissey's follow-up, Blood for Dracula (1974), which cemented his status in the horror genre and led to roles in many vampire-themed pictures throughout his career, including Blade (1998), Modern Vampires (1998), Shadow of the Vampire (2000), Dracula 3000 (2004), and BloodRayne (2005). He became famous for his work with cult directors, including Rainer Werner Fassbinder, Walerian Borowczyk, Gus Van Sant, Christoph Schlingensief, and Dario Argento (in whose classic Suspiria (1977) he was featured). He appeared in almost all of Lars von Trier's films beginning with 1987's Epidemic (with the exceptions of The Idiots, The Boss of it All, Antichrist, and The House That Jack Built).

His most famous Hollywood roles include his appearances as Ron Camp in Ace Ventura: Pet Detective (1994), Curly in Barb Wire, a NASA flight psychologist in Armageddon, the villainous Lorenzini in The Adventures of Pinocchio and its 1999 sequel The New Adventures of Pinocchio, and Ralfi in the film Johnny Mnemonic. In 1992, Kier appeared in photos in Madonna's controversial book Sex. He also appeared in the music videos for Madonna's songs "Erotica" and "Deeper and Deeper", both taken from Madonna's 1992 album Erotica. Kier also appeared in the music videos for Korn's "Make Me Bad", and for Eve's and Gwen Stefani's "Let Me Blow Ya Mind".

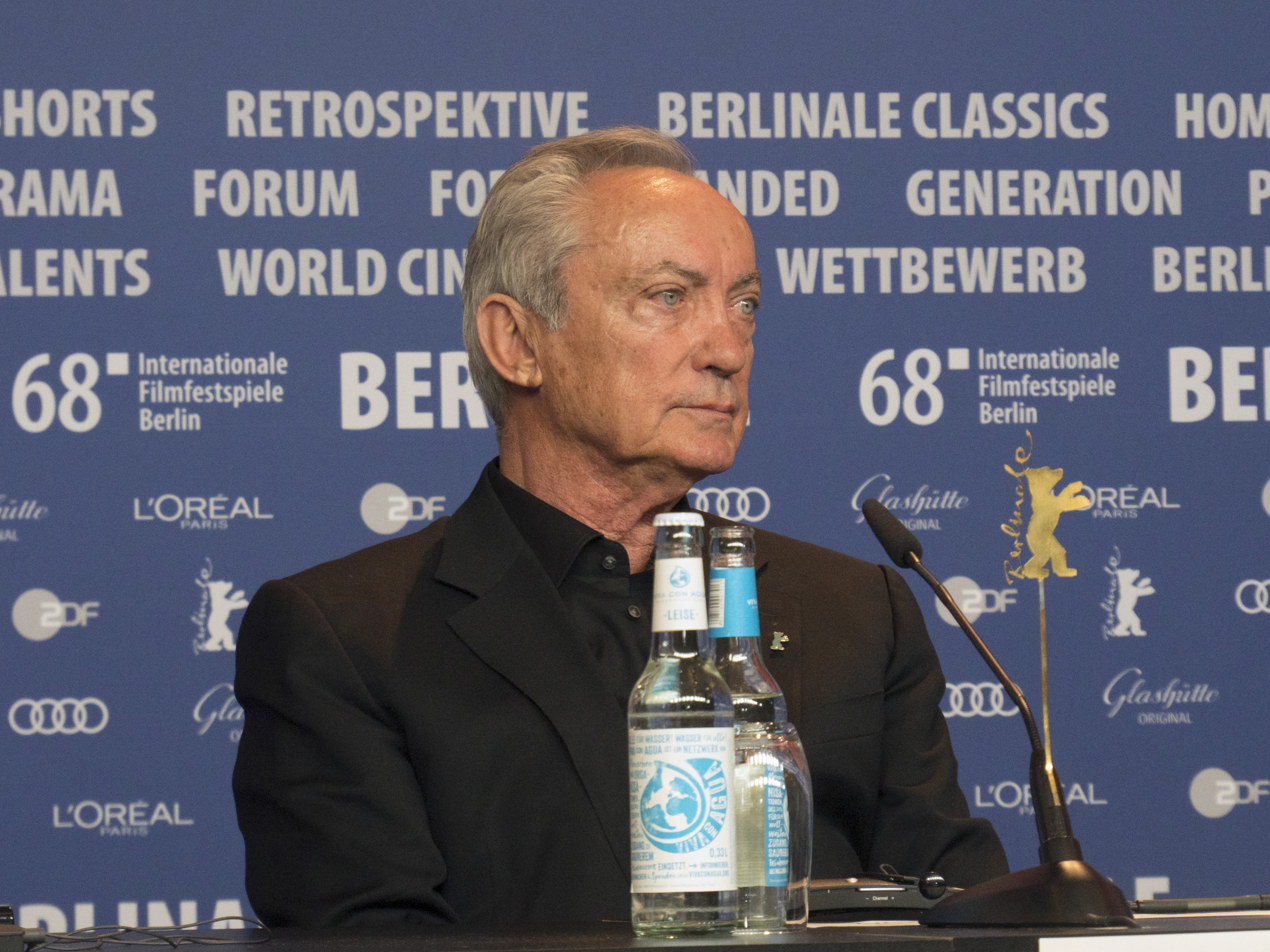
Kier at the press conference of Don't Worry, He Won't Get Far on Foot at the 2018 Berlinale

Kier also worked extensively as a voice actor, starring as the psychic Yuri (as well as the voice of the PsiCorps) in Command & Conquer: Red Alert 2 and its expansion, Yuri's Revenge. He also voiced the Music Master in Justice League, Herbert Ziegler in The Batman, Ivan Bahn in Metropia, Professor Pericles in Scooby-Doo! Mystery Incorporated, Mister Toad in Beware the Batman, and Dr. Peter Straub in Call of Duty: WWII. He also guest-starred in Axe Cop, Major Lazer, and Golan the Insatiable. He appeared in the trailer for Hideo Kojima's horror video game OD, revealed at The Game Awards. In 2025, Kojima stated on Twitter that Kier did not complete his recording voice and motion capture footage for the game.

Kier posthumously appeared in the fourth season of the AMC series Dark Winds.

=== Personal life ===
Kier was gay, and open about his sexuality his entire life. In 2021, he said, "No one ever asked. Maybe it was obvious, but it didn't make any difference because all that mattered was the role I was playing. As long as I did a good job on the part, no one cared about my sexuality." He otherwise maintained privacy about his personal life, although stated in a 2022 interview that he had been in a long-term relationship for over 20 years. At the time of his death, he was in a relationship with artist Delbert McBride.

From 1991 until his death, Kier resided in Palm Springs, California.

Kier was invited into the Academy of Motion Picture Arts and Sciences in 2020.

=== Death ===
Kier died at Eisenhower Medical Center in Rancho Mirage, California, on 23 November 2025, at the age of 81. His partner, artist Delbert McBride, verified the news. He was buried at Hollywood Forever Cemetery, and his service was attended by colleagues including Hideo Kojima and Todd Stephens.

== Legacy ==
=== Documentaries ===
A documentary on Kier's life and career entitled ICH-UDO...der Schauspieler Udo Kier (ME –UDO...the actor Udo Kier) was filmed for Arte, the European Franco-German culture channel, and released in 2012. In 2013, the documentary won a finalist certificate in the New York Festivals' International TV & Film Awards Competition. Another documentary entitled Udo Kier - Dracula trash et dandy magnétique was released by Jobst Knigge (Germany, 2024, 52 min.) and broadcast by Arte France in early November 2024 celebrating his 80th birthday.

== Sources ==
- Haines, Richard W. (2010). The Moviegoing Experience, 1968-2001. Jefferson, North Carolina: McFarland. ISBN 978-0-786-48074-6.
- Lowenstein, Adam (2005). Shocking Representation: Historical Trauma, National Cinema, and the Modern Horror Film. New York City: Columbia University Press. ISBN 978-0-231-13247-3.
