= Chris Stafford =

American actor (born 1977)

Chris Stafford (born July 18, 1977, in Collinsville, Illinois) is an American actor. He has acted in film and television, including Law & Order. Stafford starred in the coming-out movie Edge of Seventeen (1998). He received an Independent Spirit Award nomination for his role in the film.
