= Tina Holmes =

American television and film actress (born 1973)

- Occupation: Actress
- Years active: 1998–present

Tina Holmes is an American television and film actress, known for appearing as Maggie Sibley in Six Feet Under.

== Early years and education ==
Holmes grew up in New York City and Connecticut. She attended Yale University for two years followed by a move to Paris, France, studying French Literature at the Sorbonne. After returning to the U.S., Holmes entered Brown University where she earned her Bachelor of Arts degree in Comparative Literature. After graduating from Brown, Holmes returned to Paris to serve as a research assistant on a documentary on famed novelist, poet and playwright Jean Genet. She also spent time at the Federal University of Pernambuco in Brazil.

== Acting career ==
Holmes began her film acting career with 1998's Edge of Seventeen, playing the starring role of Maggie. She followed that with roles in the movies 30 Days in 1999; The Photographer and Prince of Central Park in 2000; Seven and a Match in 2003; Pretty Persuasion in 2005; Half Nelson in 2006; and Shelter in 2007.

Holmes has also been featured in several television series such as Grey's Anatomy (Season 3 Episode 4; "What I Am"), 24, Law & Order: Special Victims Unit, NYPD Blue (episode: "It's to Die For, 11/04/2003"), Invasion, CSI: Crime Scene Investigation, Third Watch, Criminal Minds, Cold Case (episode: "Dog Day Afternoons"), Prison Break how Kristine Kellerman, sister of Paul Kellerman and in a recurring role as Maggie Sibley on the HBO original series Six Feet Under during the fourth and fifth seasons.

She portrayed Moira on NBC's Persons Unknown before it was cancelled.

She appeared as a waitress/patient named Nadia on the February 14, 2011 episode of House, entitled "You Must Remember This".

She appeared as Laurel, an expectant mother carrying twins, on the February 23, 2012, episode of Private Practice, entitled "Andromeda".
