= Another Gay Movie =

2006 film by Todd Stephens

- Theatrical release poster
- Directed by: Todd Stephens
- Written by: Todd Stephens
- Produced by: Todd Stephens; Jesse Adams; Karen Jaroneski
- Starring: Michael Carbonaro; Jonah Blechman; Jonathan Chase; Mitch Morris; Ashlie Atkinson; Scott Thompson; Graham Norton; Stephanie McVay
- Cinematography: Carl Bartels
- Edited by: Jeremy Stulberg
- Music by: Marty Beller; Nancy Sinatra (song)
- Production companies: Luna Pictures; Piloton Entertainment; Velvet Films
- Distributed by: TLA Releasing
- Release date: April 29, 2006
- Running time: 93 minutes
- Country: United States
- Language: English
- Budget: $500,000
- Box office: $745,327

Another Gay Movie is a 2006 American romantic comedy film directed by Todd Stephens. It follows four gay friends, Andy, Jarod, Nico and Griff, who vow upon graduating from high school that they will all lose their "anal virginity" before their friend's Labor Day party. The film takes content from the 1999 teen comedy American Pie. A sequel, Another Gay Sequel: Gays Gone Wild!, was released in 2008.

== Plot ==
Four gay friends have recently graduated from San Torum High School. Andy is an awkward, sex-crazed character who frequently masturbates with his drag queen mother's fruits and vegetables. Jarod is a handsome and fit jock who is quite insecure. Griff is a nerdy, well-dressed guy who is secretly in love with Jarod. Nico is the most flamboyant, outgoing, and effeminate of the group. The four of them decide to make a pact to have sex by the end of the summer. Each boy proceeds to pursue sex in different ways, with both tragic and comedic results. Nico tries to secure an online date with a man named Ryder, but ends up with the grandfather of their lesbian athlete friend “Muffler”. Out of the group, it is Muffler who is the most advanced at sex and dating; she proceeds to give the boys any helpful advice where she can, despite being a lesbian, all the while remaining focused on seducing the all-female cheer team. Jarod seeks out fellow jocks, including a baseball pitcher named Beau, while Griff tries to earn the affection of Angel, a male stripper; Jarod and Griff leave these men to have sex with each other instead, because they are in love. Andy, having failed to seduce his long-time crush, his math teacher, Mr. Puckov, has a threesome with the rejected Beau and Angel.

== Cast ==
- Michael Carbonaro as Andy Wilson
- Jonah Blechman as Nico Hunter
- Jonathan Chase as Jarod
- Mitch Morris as Griff
- Ashlie Atkinson as Dawn Muffler
- Scott Thompson as Mr. Wilson
- Graham Norton as Mr. Puckov
- Stephanie McVay as Bonnie Hunter
- Lypsinka as Mrs. Wilson
- James Getzlaff as Beau
- Darryl Stephens as Angel
- Richard Hatch as himself
- George Marcy as Grandpa Muffler
- Megan Saraceni as Mini-Muff
- Saudia Mills as Muffler Acquaintance
- Andersen Gabrych as Tyler
- Angela Oh as Tiki
- Joanna Leeds as Daisy
- Mink Stole (deleted scenes) as Sloppi Seconds

== Production ==
Todd Stephens' previous work revolved around gay teens, like Edge of Seventeen and Gypsy 83. The film was a result of Stephens difficulty in securing distribution of Gypsy 83 because the film was not "gay" enough. Stephens said "I was really angry when I wrote it. Very frustrated. And Another Gay Movie's what came out." Actor Jonah Blechman initially refused the script, but became intrigued by his own shock to Stephens' script that he decided to join the project as the executive producer.

== Release and reception ==
On April 29, 2006, the film had its premier at Lowes Village East in New York. The film grossed $745,327 at the box office on a $500,000 budget.

Tirdad Derakhshani of The Philadelphia Inquirer described the film as "an unapologetic, un-P.C., in-your-face gay take on American Pie." Kyle Buchanan of The Advocate reflected the positive impact of the film as a "...parody that felt necessary. Arriving during the heyday of Project Runway and The Ellen DeGeneres Show, the film came as both confirmation of gay people's mainstream status and a built-in corrective to it." The film was not reviewed favorably by Ann Hornaday of The Washington Post, who described the film as a painful derivative of the gross-out teen comedy. Ed Blank said the campy vulgarity of the film caters to a niche audience, but the film "delivers an abominable ensemble performance in an unplayable script".

== Soundtrack ==
1. Another Gay Sunshine Day – Nancy Sinatra
2. I Know What Boys Like – Amanda Lepore
3. Everything Makes Me Think About Sex – Barcelona
4. Clap (See the Stars) – The Myrmidons
5. Vamos a la Playa – United State of Electronica
6. Dirty Boy – IQU
7. Hot Stuff – The Specimen
8. Fuego – Naty Botero
9. All Over Your Face – Cazwell
10. Pleasure Boy – Seelenluft
11. This is Love – Self
12. Peterbilt Angel – Morel
13. Another Ray of Sunshine – Nancy Sinatra
14. Let the Music Play – Shannon
15. I Was Born This Way – Craig C. featuring Jimmy Somerville
