= Todd Stephens =

American film director

- Born: United States
- Occupations: Film director, writer, producer
- Years active: 1998–present
- Known for: Edge of Seventeen, Swan Song

Todd Stephens is an American film director, writer, and producer. He was raised in Sandusky, Ohio, which has served as the setting for several of his films in what he calls his "Ohio Trilogy" or "Sandusky Trilogy". Many of his films are gay-themed.

Stephens studied film at New York University. He both wrote and produced the autobiographical coming out film Edge of Seventeen (directed by David Moreton), which was released in 1998 and is based on his own experiences as a gay teenager in Sandusky in the 1980s.

He made his directorial debut with Gypsy 83 in 2001, a road film about two goth outcasts traveling from Sandusky to New York City. After facing pressure to make more mainstream films, Stephens directed Another Gay Movie (2006) and its sequel Another Gay Sequel: Gays Gone Wild! (2008), which premiered at the Frameline Film Festival in San Francisco.

After a twelve-year hiatus from directing, during which he worked as a college professor, Stephens returned with Swan Song (2021), which completed his Ohio Trilogy. The film stars Udo Kier as a retired gay hairdresser inspired by a real-life Sandusky figure named Pat Pitsenbarger. The film premiered at South by Southwest in 2021 and received nominations at the Independent Spirit Awards for Best Screenplay and Best Male Lead.

== Filmography ==
Year	Title	Role(s)
1998	Edge of Seventeen	Writer, Producer
2001	Gypsy 83	Director, Writer (also story), Producer, Soundtrack ("Voice So Sweet")
2006	Another Gay Movie	Director, Writer (screenplay & story), Producer, Soundtrack ("Another Gay Sunshine Day", "Another Ray of Sunshine")
2008	Another Gay Sequel: Gays Gone Wild!	Director, Writer, Producer
2021	Swan Song	Director, Writer, Producer

== Awards and nominations ==
Year	Film	Festival / Award	Category	Result
1998	Edge of Seventeen	L.A. Outfest	Grand Jury Award for Outstanding Screenwriting	Won
2001	Gypsy 83	Seattle Lesbian & Gay Film Festival	Award for Excellence – Best New Director	Won
2002	Gypsy 83	Torino International Gay & Lesbian Film Festival	Audience Award – Best Feature Film	Won
2002	Gypsy 83	Torino International Gay & Lesbian Film Festival	Best Feature Film	Nominated
2002	Gypsy 83	Toronto Inside Out Lesbian and Gay Film and Video Festival	Audience Award – Best Feature Film or Video	Won
2021	Swan Song	Cleveland International Film Festival	DReam Catcher Award	Won
2022	Swan Song	Independent Spirit Awards	Best Screenplay	Nominated
2022	Swan Song	Independent Spirit Awards	Best Male Lead (Udo Kier)	Nominated
2022	Swan Song	GLAAD Media Awards	Outstanding Film – Limited Release	Nominated
2022	Swan Song	Artios Awards	Outstanding Achievement in Casting – Low Budget Feature	Nominated
