= Edge of Seventeen (film) =

1998 film directed by David Moreton

- Theatrical release poster
- Directed by: David Moreton
- Written by: Todd Stephens; David Moreton
- Produced by: David Moreton; Todd Stephens
- Starring: Chris Stafford; Tina Holmes; Andersen Gabrych; Stephanie McVay; Lea DeLaria
- Cinematography: Gina DeGirolamo
- Edited by: Tal Ben-David
- Music by: Tom Bailey
- Production companies: Luna Pictures; Blue Streak Films
- Distributed by: Strand Releasing
- Release dates: June 14, 1998 (New York); June 11, 1999
- Running time: 103 minutes
- Country: United States
- Language: English
- Budget: $1.5 million
- Box office: $871,759

Edge of Seventeen is a 1998 coming of age romantic comedy-drama film directed by David Moreton, written by Moreton and Todd Stephens, starring Chris Stafford, and co-starring Tina Holmes and Andersen Gabrych.

== Plot ==
Sandusky, Ohio, 1984: Eric Hunter is a Eurythmics-obsessed, musically driven teenager coming to terms with his sexual identity. When Eric and his best friend, Maggie, accept summer jobs in food service at the local amusement park, they befriend their lesbian manager, Angie, and gay college student, Rod. Sparks fly between the two boys, even as Maggie waits patiently in the wings for Eric's affections. Eric and Rod eventually go on a date that ends at a motel, but then Rod promptly heads back to Ohio State. The encounter leaves Eric with mixed feelings, but he is now more sure of his sexuality.

After beginning his senior year of high school, Eric starts to change up his appearance by letting Maggie dye the top half of his hair blonde, and wearing edgier and more effeminate clothes. This raises eyebrows with his loving parents, but Eric learns that his mom is going to get a part-time job at a local movie multiplex to help send him to study music in New York. While at a party with Maggie, several guys from their school call Eric gay slurs that cause him to leave. Later that night, Eric ventures out to the local gay disco "The Universal", a hopping joint run by none other than his old boss, Angie, who tells him not to worry about what everyone else thinks. He dances with a guy who takes him out to his car where the guy gives Eric a rim job, but then leaves shortly afterwards. Stung by a meaningless sexual experience, he calls Rod, who at first seems happy to hear from him, but then tells Eric that he probably shouldn't call him anymore. Eric then goes to Maggie's house where he finally tells her that he is gay. Maggie does not seem to be that surprised since she suspected Eric's relationship with Rod, but she comforts him nevertheless.

Eric starts visiting the bar frequently, where he feels accepted by Angie and her close circle of friends. While waiting to meet up with Maggie one night, Eric clicks with a local college student named Jonathan. When Maggie finally comes to the club, she is heckled by Angie's friends for being Eric's "fag hag", and leaves. Eric follows Maggie, but she is upset at him for previously leading her on. Eric goes back to the club to find Jonathan, only to discover that he is already gone. He goes to the Ohio State dorms in hopes of finding him, but decides to find Rod instead. They go back to Rod's room where they have sex. Eric is shown to be uncomfortable during it, and leaves after Rod falls asleep.

When Eric goes home, he is ambushed by his mother, Bonnie, about his recent behavior and appearance, and says that people are getting the wrong idea about him. Eric leaves, and goes to see Angie. While at her house, Angie explains to Eric that it is difficult to accept yourself for who you really are, and that he should give himself some time. He reconciles with Maggie, but quickly realizes that it was a mistake after sleeping together. Crestfallen at his rejection and his willingness to toy with her affections, Maggie ends the friendship. After she leaves, Eric's mother confronts him about a pair of matches she found in his clothes that were from the bar. He quickly denies ever going to the Universal, and leaves. When Eric finally comes home, he finds his mother playing on the piano. He comes out to her; feeling a weight being lifted off his shoulders.

Eric later goes back to the bar just as Angie begins to sing. The film ends with Eric and Jonathan reunited as they watch Angie perform. It is loosely implied that after high school, he will go off to New York City for college and live the life he wants to live.

== Cast ==
- Chris Stafford as Eric Hunter
- Tina Holmes as Maggie
- Andersen Gabrych as Rod
- Stephanie McVay as Bonnie Hunter
- Lea DeLaria as Angie
- Tony Maietta as Gregg
- Barbie Marie as Frieda
- John Eby as Dad
- Jeff Fryer as Johnathon
- Jason Lockhart as Steve (credited as Jason Scheingross)
- Jason Griffith (uncredited) as High School Party Friend

== Production ==
While part of the film was set at Ohio State University, a portion of the filming was completed at Oberlin College.

Much of the filming took place in Sandusky, Ohio, with the amusement park scenes filmed at Sandusky's Cedar Point, the amusement park where the writer actually worked when he was in high school.

== Release ==
The film premiered at the New York Lesbian, Gay, Bisexual, & Transgender Film Festival in June 1998 and the Sundance Film Festival in January 1999, before getting a limited release in June 1999.

== Reception ==
Edge of Seventeen currently holds a 79% approval rating on Rotten Tomatoes, based on 24 reviews with an average rating of 6.6/10.

Stephen Holden of The New York Times wrote, "The insecurities and turbulent desires of adolescence have rarely been portrayed more faithfully on screen than in Edge of Seventeen, the latest and most poignant in a recent spate of teen-age male coming-out-of-the-closet dramas."

== Accolades ==
1998 Outfest

- Won Audience Award
  - Outstanding Narrative Feature (David Moreton)
- Grand Jury Award
  - Outstanding American Narrative Feature (David Moreton)
  - Outstanding Screenwriting (Todd Stephens)

1998 San Francisco International Lesbian & Gay Film Festival

- Won Audience Award
  - Best Feature (David Moreton)

== Soundtrack ==
Music from the Motion Picture Soundtrack

1. "Right by Your Side" – Eurythmics
2. "Smalltown Boy" – Bronski Beat
3. "Wishing (If I Had a Photograph of You)" – A Flock of Seagulls
4. "Obsession" – Animotion
5. "The Politics of Dancing" – Re-Flex
6. "Love Plus One" – Haircut One Hundred
7. "Destination Unknown" – Missing Persons
8. "So Many Men, So Little Time" – Miquel Brown
9. "High Energy" – Evelyn Thomas
10. "Mickey" – Toni Basil
11. "Why?" – Bronski Beat
12. "Modern Love Is Automatic" – A Flock of Seagulls
13. "In the Name of Love" – Thompson Twins
14. "You're My World" – Cilla Black
15. "Blue Skies" – Lea DeLaria

== In popular culture ==
- Andersen Gabrych, who portrays Rod, appears as a drugged-out version of the character in Another Gay Sequel: Gays Gone Wild!, another film by writer Todd Stephens.
- Stephanie McVay, who portrays Bonnie Hunter, appears as the same character in Another Gay Movie, as the mother of Nicco Hunter, another gay son. Repeating the scene from this film when Eric comes out to his mother (even wearing a similar costume and hairstyle playing the piano), Nicco announces he likes men. McVay looks at him incredulously and then says, "Well duh!".

== See also ==
- "Edge of Seventeen", song by Stevie Nicks on which the film's title is based.
