= J. D. Disalvatore =

American film director

- Born: Julie Disalvatore; March 5, 1966; Plymouth, Massachusetts, U.S.
- Died: August 24, 2017 (aged 51); Sherman Oaks, California, U.S.
- Occupation: Film director
- Known for: Shelter

Julie "J. D." Disalvatore (March 5, 1966 – August 24, 2017) was an American LGBT film and television producer/director and gay rights activist. She was openly lesbian.

== Career ==
Disalvatore's credits include the award-winning Shelter (2007), Eating Out 2 (2006), A Marine Story (2010) Gay Propaganda and Elena Undone. In addition to producing LGBT films, she had also written extensively about LGBT film for outlets including Clout, Curve, GayWired.com, PlanetOut.com Gay.com, QTMagazine, POWER UP and here! online in addition to her daily blog on Gay and Lesbian entertainment.

Disalvatore was also the Festival Manager at Outfest: The Los Angeles Gay & Lesbian Film Festival, the largest film festival in Los Angeles. She had also produced panels on LGBT film for Outfest, Power UP and the Writers Guild of America. She also produced the queer entertainment news show HERE@ for the here! networks. Disalvatore was on the Board of Directors of the Los Angeles Gay and Lesbian Chamber of Commerce, where she served a term as Vice President of the Board and was last President of the Board of Directors of the Frontiers Foundation. She was a mentor with The Point Foundation.

== Death ==
Disalvatore died of breast cancer at her home in Sherman Oaks, California, at the age of 51.

== Awards and honors ==
Disalvatore won a GLAAD Media Award for Shelter, for best feature film in limited release. In 2009, Disalvatore was honored at the Los Angeles Gay and Lesbian Center's An Evening With Women with a LACE (Lesbians and bisexual women Active in Community Empowerment) Award for her work in the community, and was featured in Go Magazine's "100 Women We Love".

== See also ==
- List of lesbian filmmakers
