= Mitch Morris =

American actor (born 1979)

- Born: John Mitchell Morris; October 15, 1979 (age 46); Corpus Christi, Texas, U.S.
- Education: California State University (BA); Villanova University (JD); Sarah Lawrence College (MFA)
- Occupations: Film, television actor

John Mitchell Morris (born October 15, 1979), known professionally as Mitch Morris, is an American actor.

== Early life and education ==
Morris was raised in Portland, Texas. He graduated from Gregory-Portland High School in 1998. As a trumpet player, he was offered a music scholarship to the University of North Texas, but turned it down to study Radio, Television and Film. Morris holds a BA in psychology from California State University, Northridge and a JD from Villanova University School of Law and a MFA in creative writing at Sarah Lawrence College.

== Career ==
After moving to Los Angeles, he first appeared as a model in an ad campaign for American Eagle Outfitters. Soon after, he began making guest appearances on shows such as Buffy the Vampire Slayer, ER and Presidio Med.

In 2003, Morris made his stage debut in the LA revival of the Pulitzer Prize-nominated play Summertree. He then led the "pink posse," as Cody Bell on Showtime's Queer as Folk before playing CIA tech-genius Ken Watkins on Jerry Bruckheimer's E-Ring. Morris can also be seen in the police drama, Honor.

Morris played the role of Griff in Todd Stephens' sex comedy, Another Gay Movie, which made its world premiere at the 2006 Tribeca Film Festival.

Morris practiced with the Kane Law Firm in Los Angeles. As of 2022, his law license is still active and is a member of the California Bar. He then became a lecturer in writing and a chair of college writing at Purchase College in Purchase, New York.
