= Gypsy 83 =

2001 film by Todd Stephens

- Poster
- Directed by: Todd Stephens
- Screenplay by: Todd Stephens
- Story by: Todd Stephens; Tim Kaltenecker
- Produced by: Todd Stephens; Todd Calvin; Karen Jaroneski; Christine McAndrews
- Starring: Sara Rue; Kett Turton
- Cinematography: Gina Degirolamo; Mai Iskander
- Edited by: Annette Davey
- Music by: Marty Beller
- Production companies: Luna Pictures; Staccato Films; Velvet Films
- Distributed by: Palisades Pictures; Small Planet Pictures
- Release date: June 6, 2001 (New York)
- Running time: 94 minutes
- Country: United States
- Language: English
- Box office: $29,367

Gypsy 83 is an American 2001 drama film, written and directed by Todd Stephens. The film is about two young goths, Gypsy and Clive, who travel to New York for an annual festival celebrating their idol, Stevie Nicks.

Filming took place in Hazleton, Pennsylvania.

== Plot ==
25 year old Gypsy Vale (Sara Rue) and 18 year old Clive Webb (Kett Turton) are two goths living in Sandusky, Ohio. Gypsy's parents, Ray (John Doe) and Velvet (Marlene Wallace), once were in a band together, and Gypsy now aspires to be a famous singer, like her idol, Stevie Nicks. Because of her mother's disappearance, she hesitates to leave her father alone in Sandusky to pursue her dreams.

While checking updates on a Stevie Nicks fansite, Clive discovers the Night of a Thousand Stevies event in New York. After a long and heated discussion with Gypsy, her father reveals that her mother didn't just disappear, or die: she left to follow her dream of becoming a famous singer. Despite this, Clive finally convinces Gypsy to go to New York.

Along the way, Gypsy and Clive encounter various characters and obstacles. They pick up a hitchhiker named Zechariah, who claims he is running away from the Amish life. The three decide to stop and spend the night at a rest stop.

While there, Clive expresses his attraction for Zechariah, but Zechariah says he's attracted to Gypsy. Clive is embarrassed and runs away. Gypsy is surprised and flattered and as a result, she and Zechariah end up sleeping together.

Afterward, Zechariah says he's made a mistake and must return home. Enraged, Gypsy throws him out of the restroom where she stays at the rest stop. Meanwhile, Clive is accosted in secret by Troy, who is also spending the night at the rest stop with his fraternity brothers, and the two have a sexual encounter.

The next morning, while Gypsy and Clive try to console each other and make sense of the previous night's events, the two are egged and mocked by the fraternity brothers as they leave the rest area while Troy sits silently. They miss the auditions for the Night of a Thousand Stevies, and Gypsy learns that her mother committed suicide 4 years earlier.

The sympathetic Mistress of Ceremonies, also her mother's best friend when she was in New York, allows Gypsy to perform a song she wrote for her mother at the show's end. In the end, Gypsy stays in New York to pursue her musical aspirations like her mother, and Clive returns to Sandusky to finish high school but plans to return to New York after he graduates.

== Cast ==
- Sara Rue as Gypsy Vale
- Kett Turton as Clive Webb
- Karen Black as Bambi LeBleau, a retired singer
- John Doe as Ray Vale, Gypsy's father
- Marlene Wallace as Velvet Vale, Gypsy's mother
- Anson Scoville as Zechariah Peachy, an Amish runaway
- Paulo Costanzo as Troy, a college frat boy
- Carolyn Baeumler as Lois
- Stephanie McVay as Polly Pearl
- Amanda Talbot as Connie
- Vera Beren as Empress Chi Chi Valenti, a goth club matron
- Andersen Gabrych as Banning

== Music ==
The film's original music was composed by Marty Beller. The soundtrack features well known icons of the gothic subculture, such as The Cure, Claire Voyant, and electronic music artists Velvet Acid Christ and Apoptygma Berzerk. The film also features a cover of Stevie Nicks' 1985 hit Talk to Me (Stevie Nicks song) by gothic rock band Diva Destruction.

== Reception ==
On the review aggregator website Rotten Tomatoes, 54% of 26 critics' reviews are positive, with an average rating of 5.5/10. The website's consensus reads: "This coming-of-age story of alienated youth is too familiar."

=== Awards and nominations ===
Wins

L.A. Outfest

- Grand Jury Award – Outstanding Actor in a Feature Film (Kett Turton) (Tied with Paul Dano in L.I.E. (2001))

Seattle Lesbian & Gay Film Festival

- Award for Excellence – Best New Director (Todd Stephens)

Torino International Gay & Lesbian Film Festival

- Audience Award – Best Feature Film (Todd Stephens)

Toronto Inside Out Lesbian and Gay Film and Video Festival

- Audience Award – Best Feature Film or Video (Todd Stephens)

Nominations

Torino International Gay & Lesbian Film Festival

- Best Feature Film (Todd Stephens)
