= Steve Treviño =

American comedian, screenwriter, and film producer (born 1978)

- Born: January 16, 1978 (age 48); Gregory-Portland, Texas, U.S.
- Occupations: Comedian; writer; producer
- Years active: 1997–present
- Known for: Steve Treviño: 'Til Death, Steve Treviño: Relatable, Steve Treviño: Grandpa Joe's Son
- Style: Stand Up Comedian, Relationship Humor
- Spouse: Renae "Captain Evil" Treviño
- Children: 2
- Website: stevetrevino.com

Steve Treviño is an American stand-up comedian, writer, and producer. He has released four stand-up specials, the first of which was filmed for Showtime, the second released on Netflix, and the third is now available on Amazon Prime Video, the fourth released on Netflix. He also worked as a writer for Carlos Mencia's Comedy Central show, Mind of Mencia and Pitbull's La Esquina.

== Early life ==
Treviño comes from a Mexican-American background in Portland, Texas. The family includes Tom Treviño who won the World Series of Poker in 2013-2014.

== Career ==
Treviño began his comedy career in 1997 at age 19, often working the Addison Improv Comedy Club in Addison, Texas. Often, he volunteered to take the club's headlining comedians to promotional radio interviews.

One of Treviño's first major gigs also came at age 19 when he opened for Carlos Mencia. In 2005 and 2006, he was a writer and performer on Mencia's television show, Mind of Mencia.

In 2008, he became a writer and producer on Pitbull's mun2 television show, La Esquina. He also made stand-up comedy appearances on The Late Late Show with Craig Ferguson, Comics Unleashed, and ComicView.

In 2011, Treviño appeared on Marc Maron's podcast, WTF with Marc Maron, where he criticized Carlos Mencia for his documented joke theft and history of bumping other comedians.

In 2012, Treviño released his first stand-up special for Showtime called Steve Treviño: Grandpa Joe's Son.

His second special, Steve Treviño: Relatable, aired on NuvoTV in February 2014 and began streaming on Netflix later that year. The special was recorded at the American Bank Center in Corpus Christi.

In October 2017, Treviño began working on producing a third stand-up special called Steve Treviño: 'Til Death which was released in January 2019 and is now streaming on Amazon Amazon Prime Video.

In June 2020, Steve partnered with his wife Renae "Captain Evil" Treviño and launched a podcast featuring the two discussing their marriage, family, and their overall life as the Treviños. "Steve Treviño & Captain Evil: The Podcast" officially launched on June 3, 2020, during the COVID-19 pandemic, and airs episodes weekly on Facebook, YouTube, and other podcast distributors.

During the 2020 COVID-19 pandemic, Steve worked on, filmed, and released his fourth stand-up special called Steve Treviño: My Life in quarantine which was filmed in front of a live, socially-distanced, masked audience and released on October 15, 2020 through the site On Location Live. The special includes new stand-up comedy from Steve along with an episode of the podcast "Steve Treviño & Captain Evil: The Podcast", filmed in front of the live audience. In addition, there are special appearances from family members, including his son Garrett, his mom "Miss Dora," as well as his father-in-law, "Daddy Raymond."

Steve’s self produced fifth special filmed in Waco, Texas, entitled I Speak Wife, was independently released on Friday, October 21, 2022 for free exclusively to his global audience on YouTube.

== Filmography ==
=== Television ===
Year	Title	Role	Notes
2002	USO Comedy Tour (TV Series)	Himself	Stand-up Performance
2005–06	Mind of Mencia		Writer, performer
2005	The Daily Buzz (TV Series)	Himself	
2006	Comics Unleashed	Himself	Stand-up Performance
2007	The Late Late Show with Craig Ferguson	Himself	Stand-up Performance
2008	XXXtreme Comedy Tour (TV Special)	Himself	Stand-up Performance
2008	Pitbull's La Esquina		Producer, writer
2010	The Bob & Tom Show (TV Series)	Himself	
2011	Comedy.TV	Himself	Stand-up Performance
2012	Steve Treviño: Grandpa Joe's Son	Himself	Stand-up Comedy Special: Showtime, writer, executive producer
2012	Comedy Unfiltered	Himself	Stand-up Performance
2014	Steve Treviño: Relatable	Himself	Stand-up Comedy Special: Netflix, writer, executive producer
2014	That's Entertainment	Himself	Panelist
2014	Laughs	Himself	
2019	Steve Treviño: 'Til Death	Himself	Stand-up Comedy Special: Amazon Prime Video, writer, executive producer
2020	Steve Treviño: My Life in Quarantine	Himself	Stand-up Comedy Special: Amazon Prime Video, writer, executive producer
2022	Steve Treviño: I Speak Wife	Himself	Stand-up Comedy Special: YouTube, writer, executive producer
2024	Steve Treviño: Simple Man	Himself	Stand-up Comedy Special: Netflix, writer, executive producer

== Discography ==
- Steve Treviño: That's How Daddy Does It (2005)
- Steve Treviño: Live (2010)
- Steve Treviño: Grandpa Joe's Son (2012)
- Steve Treviño: 'Til Death (2019)

== Podcast ==
- Steve Treviño & Captain Evil: The Podcast (2020)
