= Portland, Texas =

- City
- Nickname: Gem City By the Gulf
- Motto: Building Community and Raising Families
- Coordinates: 27°52′59″N 97°19′14″W
- Country: United States
- State: Texas
- Counties: San Patricio, Nueces

Government
  - Type: Council-Manager
  - Mayor: John Green
  - City Manager: Randy L. Wright

Area
  - Total: 25.14 sq mi (65.11 km^{2})
  - Land: 12.49 sq mi (32.35 km^{2})
  - Water: 2.65 sq mi (6.87 km^{2})
- Elevation: 43 ft (13 m)

Population (2020)
  - Total: 20,383
  - Density: 1,632/sq mi (630.1/km^{2})
- Time zone: UTC-6 (Central (CST))
  - Summer (DST): UTC-5 (CDT)
- ZIP code: 78374
- Area code: 361
- FIPS code: 48-58904
- GNIS feature ID: 1344378
- Website: www.portlandtx.gov

Portland is a city primarily located in San Patricio County with some portions extending into Nueces County, in the U.S. state of Texas. It is located along the north shore of Corpus Christi Bay and Nueces Bay, across from Corpus Christi, in the Coastal Bend region. Portland was established in 1890 as a port and agricultural community by land developer John G. Willacy, who saw the city's high bluff and bays as an opportunity. The early settlement of the area progressed slowly until the establishment of transportation routes and developing industries, primarily in Corpus Christi, stimulated Portland's growth. Portland was officially incorporated in 1949.

Throughout the twentieth century, Portland grew from a small farming settlement into a well-established suburb closely tied to the surrounding industrial and economic development of Corpus Christi. Specifically, its location along the bay provided both scenic and commercial assistance to new residents and businesses. By the early twenty-first century, Portland was marked by residential neighborhoods, waterfront parks for recreation, and the proximity of industrial development in the area, which included the Port of Corpus Christi and petrochemical industrial plants across the bay.

In the 2020 census in the United States, Portland had a population of 20,383. The City of Portland has conducted more ongoing estimates that currently put the population at about 20,956 (as of 2025), a continued growth trend in the area. Today, Portland maintains a blend of suburban character, coastal natural areas, and economic integration with the greater Corpus Christi metropolitan area.

== History ==
=== Founding and Early Development ===
In 1890, John G. Willacy, a well-known rancher, real estate developer, and state legislator from South Texas, laid out the City of Portland. Born in Hallettsville, Texas, in 1859, Willacy promoted agricultural and coastal development projects in the area. He had purchased land from the Coleman-Fulton Pasture Company on a high bluff overlooking Nueces Bay, which he believed to be the perfect location for a settlement, given its high-quality land and access to the Bayfront for shipping. Willacy invited investors from Maine and Kansas to join him in forming the Portland Land and Improvement Company, which marketed this new town as a viable coastal port and agricultural site.

Willacy's impact reached well beyond Portland. Subsequently, he was elected as a Texas State representative from 1899 to 1903 and a state senator from 1903 to 1915, where he advocated for land and tax reform in South Texas and sponsored legislation supporting fence laws, county reorganization, and road construction. Willacy also helped establish Willacy County, which was named for him upon its establishment in 1911.

In his push to encourage settlers to Portland, Willacy was put in charge of building a large hotel and running extensive promotional campaigns. He arranged for steamboats and railroad lines to bring people in from the surrounding area for a large land sale sponsored in July 1891, which attracted hundreds of prospective buyers. The early advertisements highlighted the ocean breezes and fertile soil. Within a few months, many lots had been sold, and the young settlement had several storefronts, a newspaper, and new houses.

The economic optimism was short-lived, however, as the Panic of 1893, a national financial catastrophe, put a stop to land sales and frightened some settlers away. Willacy's once grand hotel, was later converted to Bay View College until it burned in a hurricane in the early 1900s. Hurricanes in 1916 and 1919 added to the toll on Portland, and the population would remain stagnant for several decades.

=== Incorporation and Early Industry ===
The next growth for Portland happened in the 1910s when the Portland Development Company extended rail linkages, improved access to water resources, and provided assistance with shipping cotton and other agricultural commodities to neighboring ports. The community was slowly beginning, but the groundwork had been laid for future urban and industrial growth.

A pivotal moment occurred in the 1950s with the establishment of the Reynolds Metals Company aluminium plant in 1942. This plant created hundreds of jobs and drew new families to the area, changing Portland from a small farming community into a growing residential and commercial area closely tied to Corpus Christi's industrial economy. The plant later closed in 1981, where it employed over 850 people at the height of the factory's career. Officials claimed that the closing was due to high energy costs that would cut the company's primary aluminium production by 114,000 tons annually.

=== Mid-20th Century Industrial Expansion ===
Portland became even more connected to the expanding industrial base in the Coastal Bend. Businesses, such as Sherwin Alumina, OxyChem, and Gulf Marine Fabricators. These factories had facilities in or near the City, increasing Portland's place in the Corpus Christi portion of the Metropolitan area. Portland's location near the Port of Corpus Christi and major highway routes allowed for a variety in manufacturing, energy, and petrochemical industries.

By the century's end, Portland had grown south into Nueces County and had established a reputation as a prosperous, family-friendly community with a rising population, modern infrastructure, and scenic views along the waterfront of Nueces and Corpus Christi Bays.

== Geography ==
U.S. Highway 181

Portland is situated on the second-highest bluff on the Gulf Coast and overlooks both Nueces and Corpus Christi Bays. Portland is located at 27°52′59″N 97°19′14″W (27.883117, –97.320466). According to the United States Census Bureau, the city has a total area of 25.14 sq mi (65.11 km^{2}), of which 21.84 sq mi (56.57 km^{2}) are land and 3.3 sq mi (8.54 km^{2}) (13.2%) is covered by water. The city is roughly equidistant from Portland, Maine, and Portland, Oregon. The city is just north of Corpus Christi and is connected by roads and highways including U.S. Highway 181 and State Highway 35.

== Climate ==
Portland's summers usually have high temperatures that average in the low to mid 90 degrees F. The coastal humidity can make it feel hotter outside. During the wintertime the temperatures average in the upper 40's, and the highs of the day range in the 60's. The amount of rainfall in Portland per year can average 30 to 35 inches. It rains the most during the spring into the fall. Portland also experiences a good amount of wind that can average from 15 to 20 MPH. The city also has tropical weather systems during the late summer and early fall that results with heavy rainfall and increased wind.

== Demographics ==
Historical population
Census	Pop.	Note	%±
1950	1,202		—
1960	2,538		111.1%
1970	7,302		187.7%
1980	12,023		64.7%
1990	12,224		1.7%
2000	14,827		21.3%
2010	15,099		1.8%
2020	20,383		35.0%
2025 (est.)	20,956		2.8%

=== 2020 census ===
As of the 2020 census, Portland had a population of 20,383. The median age was 35.4 years, 26.6% of residents were under the age of 18, and 13.0% were 65 years of age or older. For every 100 females there were 104.5 males, and for every 100 females age 18 and over there were 102.8 males age 18 and over.

98.0% of residents lived in urban areas, while 2.0% lived in rural areas.

There were 7,320 households in Portland, of which 38.0% had children under the age of 18 living in them. Of all households, 54.5% were married-couple households, 19.0% were households with a male householder and no spouse or partner present, and 19.8% were households with a female householder and no spouse or partner present. About 21.9% of all households were made up of individuals and 7.9% had someone living alone who was 65 years of age or older.

There were 8,512 housing units, of which 14.0% were vacant. The homeowner vacancy rate was 2.3% and the rental vacancy rate was 19.6%.

Racial composition as of the 2020 census
Race	Number	Percent
White	12,840	63.0%
Black or African American	413	2.0%
American Indian and Alaska Native	178	0.9%
Asian	583	2.9%
Native Hawaiian and Other Pacific Islander	49	0.2%
Some other race	1,888	9.3%
Two or more races	4,432	21.7%
Hispanic or Latino (of any race)	8,483	41.6%

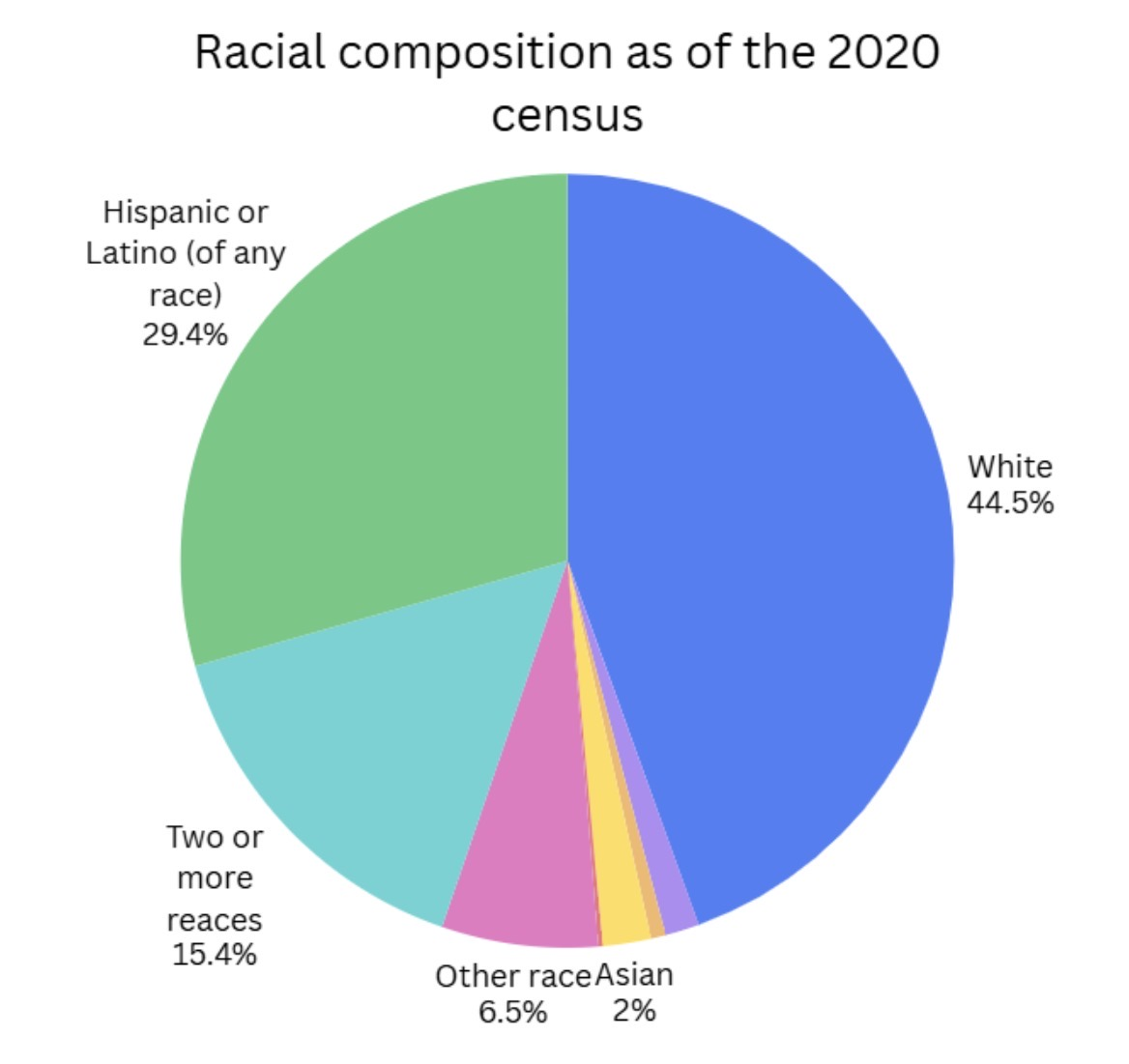
Racial composition as of the 2020 census

=== 2000 census ===
As of the census of 2000, 14,827 people, 5,021 households, and 4,051 families were residing in the city. The population density was 2,125.5 people/mi^{2} (820.7 people/km^{2}). The 5,351 housing units averaged 767.1sq mi (296.0/km^{2}).

Of the 5,021 households, 47.5% had children under the age of 18 living with them, 68.6% were married couples living together, 9.2% had a female householder with no husband present, and 19.3% were not families. About 16.1% of all households were made up of individuals, and 6.1% had someone living alone who was 65 years of age or older. The average household size was 2.94, and the average family size was 3.30.

In the city, the age distribution was 32.6% under 18, 8.2% from 18 to 24, 31.2% from 25 to 44, 20.0% from 45 to 64, and 7.9% who were 65 or older. The median age was 32 years. For every 100 females, there were 98.1 males. For every 100 females age 18 and over, there were 93.1 males. The median income for a household in the city was $48,574, and for a family was $52,220. Males had a median income of $37,316 versus $25,722 for females. The per capita income for the city was $19,871. About 5.8% of families and 7.4% of the population were below the poverty line, including 9.3% of those under age 18 and 10.2% of those age 65 or over.

== Economy ==
In 2023, 9.61k people were employed by Portland, Texas. The City of Portland employs numerous workers to help protect the city. They have police officers and firefighters, public works, parks and recreation, and utility workers.

Largest Industries in Portland, Texas (2023)
Industry	People in Workforce
Construction	1,372
Health Care & Social Assistance	1,277
Manufacturing	978

=== Industry and Corporations in Portland ===
Portland's economy is sustained by the presence of significant petrochemical and industrial plants in the nearby Coastal Bend area, taking advantage of it being adjacent to the water with access to shipping, railing, and pipelines. For example:

- Cheniere Energy is expanding its liquefied natural gas (LNG) facility in the region from an output of ~15 million/tons/year to 20 million tons/year of LNG and has about 300 full-time employees and hundreds of indirect construction job posts.
- The Chemours Company operates a fluorochemical plant in Ingleside/San Patricio County, described as a critical aspect of the local industrial sector, with over 200 employees and around 75 contract employees.
- Occidental Chemical Corporation (OxyChem) operates a large plant with docks, pipelines, and rails in the area. It is described as one of the world-leading producers and demonstrates the scale of industrial investment in the area.
- Regional permitting and industrial listing data indicates that the area surrounding San Patricio County, including Portland's portion of the Coastal Bend region, has seen a growth of several petrochemical plants and chemical-manufacturing investments in recent years.

=== Economic Growth Patterns and Regional Role ===
Since the mid-twentieth century, Portland's growth has been closely associated with the overall growth of its region's industrial base and proximity to the Port of Corpus Christi, Nueces Bay, and Corpus Christi. As a suburban and industrial-adjacent community, the city has been able to take advantage of residential growth that tied into job growth offered by surrounding plants, and development of commercial infrastructure to serve industrial workers and their families.

Factors, such as access to the waterfront, rail, and pipelines connections, combined with a favorable regulatory and tax incentive business environment have drawn the region to high-capital projects (ex. multi billion dollar petrochemical plants) which provide local economic anchor. An example of this is the Gulf Coast Growth Ventures' ethane steam-cracker project, an ExxonMobil and SABIC joint venture, which prompted permitting milestones near Portland which is expected to create thousands of construction jobs with significant local economic impact.

As the area changes from being agrarian and light-industrial based into a more of a multi-use suburban-industrial economy, the presence of large-scale industrial plants and infrastructure improvements highlight its significance within the overall region.

== Government ==
The City of Portland is led by a mayor, six council members, and a city manager. The mayor and council members were elected by the city and the city manager is elected by the council. As of May 6, 2026, the mayor is John Green, the city manager is Randy Wright, and the six council members are John G. Sutton Jr., Bill T. Wilson II, Martha Ruiz, and Peter Curran.

== Culture and Community ==
Portland hosts the annual Windfest festival, organized by the Portland Chamber of Commerce, which features live entertainment, food vendors, and family activities. The city also maintains several parks and recreational areas, including Sunset Lake Park and Indian Point Wetlands, which are popular for birdwatching, fishing, and community events.

=== Leisure and Entertainment District ===
In recent years, Portland has worked on revitalizing its downtown core and waterfront. One focus of that work is the city's Leisure and Entertainment District (LED), which exists in Old Town Portland. As part of municipal planning and in preparation of a February 2024 groundbreaking, we have learned of the 5th & Elm venue, which includes a mixed indoor/outdoor facility that boasts a performance stage, restaurant space, event space, play lawns, and interactive water features. The LED is intended to provide leisure, dining, and cultural amenities for residents and to attract a regional audience from the Corpus Christi metro area.

=== Outdoor activities and tourism ===
Portland is situated between two large bays, Corpus Christi Bay and Nueces Bay, providing many opportunities for outdoor recreational or water-related recreation. As reported by Visit Portland Texas, the city's tourism resources, there are numerous options for fishing, boating, kite or wind boarding, and birdwatching, with the possibility to hike or bike on waterfront parks. There are specific places identified as "Explore the Outdoors" by the City such as Indian Point Pier, Sunset Lake, and Violet Andrews Park. These amenities provide leisure opportunities for the purpose of enhancing tourism and participation in community life by having access to coastal water, shoreline views, and recreational amenities. According to Portland's annual comprehensive financial report of 2022, Portland's created a revenue of a little under $6,000,000 through cultural and recreation activity.

=== Media ===
The main newspaper serving the city, The Portland News, has been in existence since 1891 and is available to both San Patricio and Nueces Counties. Since its inception, it has reported on changes to Portland, from a small coastal station started by land developer John G. Willacy to a bustling city of over 20,000. Over the years, the News has established a reputation for telling stories of a community-centered nature in response to local events: municipal governance happenings, school-board related activities, the opening and closing of local businesses, civic events, and regional economic events such as expanding industries and waterfront development. The paper was acknowledged for this contribution to the journalism profession with several wards in the past few years (those from the Texas Press Association in 2017 included four awards for community journalism).Today, the Portland News is still a weekly resource for residents looking to become informed about their local government, community news stories and features, legal notices, and classified ads. In doing so, it acts as a civic space, shaping a public community discussion, understanding local identity, and reporting on the lived experience of Portland, Texas.

== Education ==
Gregory-Portland High School

Portland's public education is provided by Gregory-Portland Independent School District, made up of W. C. Andrews Elementary (grades 1–5), T. M. Clark Elementary, East Cliff Elementary, Stephen F. Austin Elementary (in Gregory), Gregory-Portland Middle School (grade 6–8), and Gregory-Portland High (grades 9–12) Schools. The Gregory-Portland ISD Early Childhood Center opened up for the 2024-2025 academic school year. The school has grades pre-k and kindergarten. The district provides academic programs, extracurricular activities, and career and technical education pathways for students. Recent facilities and enrollment in the schools reflect the city's growing population.

Del Mar College is the designated community college for all of San Patricio County and Nueces County.

== Crime ==
In 2022, Portland had a crime index lower than the U.S. average and half that of Texas. Of fifteen cities in the region, only two cities have lower crime rates than Portland.

== Notable people ==
- Matt Merrell, racing driver
- Mitch Morris, an American actor and attorney, was a regular in Queer as Folk (U.S. TV series) and star in the sex comedy, Another Gay Movie
- Vince Vieluf, an American actor; starred in An American Werewolf in Paris, Rat Race, Love, Inc., National Lampoon's Barely Legal, and cult favorite Grind.
- Don Williams (1939–2017), was a country singer and songwriter. Williams moved to Portland as a child from the Texas Panhandle/South Plains town of Floydada and was a 1958 graduate of Gregory-Portland High School. Williams had 17 songs to reach number one on the country charts.
- Steve Treviño, Comedian
- Walker Janek, American Baseball Player
