= The Politics of Dancing (Re-Flex album) =

Studio album by Re-Flex
- Released: November 1983
- Recorded: Late 1982
- Studio: Utopia Studios (London)
- Genres: New wave; synth-pop
- Length: 45:31
- Labels: EMI; Capitol
- Producer: John Punter

Re-Flex chronology
The Politics of Dancing (1983)	Humanication (1985/2010)

Singles from The Politics of Dancing
- 1. "The Politics of Dancing" Released: February 1983; 2. "Hitline" Released: 1983; 3. "Hurt" Released: 1983; 4. "Praying to the Beat" Released: 1983 (US) / 1984 (EU); 5. "Sensitive" Released: 1983 (EU) /1984 (Germany Only); 6. "Couldn't Stand a Day" Released: 1984 (UK)

The Politics of Dancing is the debut studio album by the English new wave band Re-Flex, recorded in late 1982 and released in November 1983 by EMI Records, and was, until September 2010, their only officially released studio album. John Punter of Roxy Music fame produced the album at Utopia Studios in London, England.

The album received moderate success, charting at No. 34 in New Zealand, No. 53 in the United States, and No. 58 in West Germany, but the title track was a big international success and became the band's signature song, causing some to label them a one-hit wonder. Five other singles were released from the album with minor success in the US and UK: "Hitline", "Hurt", "Praying to the Beat", "Couldn't Stand a Day", and "Sensitive".

The album was reissued on CD in 1993 through One Way Records. Jambo Music Ltd., a division of JHP, who publish and administer Re-Flex's catalogue of songs, re-released it as part of a 6-CD box set which also contained the previously unreleased Humanication album and other previously unavailable tracks recorded before and after the band's relationship with EMI. Cherry Red Records issued a 2-CD expanded edition of The Politics of Dancing with bonus material in 2019.

In 2017, the album's title track was prominently featured in the film Atomic Blonde.

== Critical reception ==
Professional ratings
Review scores
Source	Rating
AllMusic	2.5/5 stars
Trouser Press	favourable
Smash Hits	5½/10

Writing for Trouser Press, music journalist Terry Rompers wrote that "Re-Flex display a knack for penning strong melodies and playing walloping dance grooves, best exemplified on the title track and "Hurt.""

In a retrospective review for AllMusic, critic Stephen Cook wrote that "the album is mostly a bland array of robotic bass and drums, effects-riddled guitars, and annoying keyboard accents. To the band's credit, the songwriting is impressive at times, especially on the title track and "Hitline," and lead singer Baxter's vocals are admirable in their own, [David] Bowie-rehashed way. The album's future cutout-bin status, though, was sealed with aimless funk like "Jungle" and the Toto-aping MOR of "Sensitive." Approach with tongue firmly in cheek."

== Track listing ==
Side one
No.	Title	Writer(s)	Length
1.	"Praying to the Beat"	Baxter; François Craig; Paul Fishman; Roland Vaughan Kerridge	3:39
2.	"Hitline"	Fishman	3:39
3.	"Hurt"	Fishman	5:08
4.	"Couldn't Stand a Day"	Baxter; Fishman	4:10
5.	"The Politics of Dancing"	Fishman	6:36

Side two
No.	Title	Writer(s)	Length
6.	"Something About You"	Fishman	3:39
7.	"Pointless"	Fishman	3:50
8.	"Jungle"	Baxter; Fishman; Kerridge; Nigel Ross-Scott	5:25
9.	"Sensitive"	Baxter; Fishman	3:28
10.	"Keep in Touch"	Fishman	5:57
Total length:			45:31

Bonus tracks on 2019 release
No.	Title	Length
11.	"True Lust"	4:25
12.	"Hurt" (12" Pete Smith Emotional Mix — U.K. Version)	5:39
13.	"What You Deserve"	3:49
14.	"The Politics of Dancing" (12" Extended Mix)	6:42
15.	"Cruel World" (12" Extended Mix)	5:53
16.	"Praying to the Beat" (12" Extended Mix)	4:10
17.	"Flex It!" (12" Extended Mix)	5:28
18.	"Hitline" (12" Extended Mix)	5:00
19.	"Cut It" (12" Extended Mix)	4:26
20.	"Hurt" (12" John Luongo Emotional Mix — U.S. Version)	6:49
21.	"The Politics of Dancing" (U.S. 7" Version)	4:29
22.	"Flex It!" (7" Echo Mix)	3:45
23.	"Hurt" (U.S. 12" Rubber Dub Mix)	9:27

== Personnel ==
Credits are adapted from The Politics of Dancing liner notes.

Re-Flex

- John Baxter — guitar; lead vocals
- Paul Fishman — electronic keyboards; backing vocals; computers
- Roland Vaughan Kerridge — electronic and acoustic drums; percussion; programming; backing vocals
- Nigel Ross-Scott — bass; backing vocals

Production and artwork

- John Punter — producer; mixing
- Pete Smith — engineer
- Andrew Carb Canelle – assistant engineer
- Chris Sheldon – assistant engineer
- Keith Breeden – design

== Charts ==
Chart (1983–84)	Peak position
Australia (Kent Music Report)	77
Canada Top Albums/CDs (RPM)	24
German Albums (Offizielle Top 100)	58
New Zealand Albums (RMNZ)	34
US Billboard 200	53
