= The Politics of Dancing (song) =

1983 single by Re-Flex

- UK 7-inch vinyl

Single by Re-Flex

from the album The Politics of Dancing
- B-side: "Cruel World"; "Flex It!"
- Released: February 1983
- Studio: Utopia (London, England)
- Length: 6:36 (album version); 4:14 (UK and European single version); 3:55 (US single version)
- Label: EMI; Capitol
- Songwriter: Paul Fishman
- Producer: John Punter

Re-Flex singles chronology
"The Politics of Dancing" (1983)	"Hitline" (1983)

Music video
- "The Politics of Dancing" on YouTube

"The Politics of Dancing" is a song by the English new wave band Re-Flex, released in February 1983 as their debut single. It is the title track to their debut studio album. The song was written by keyboardist, backing vocalist, and band co-founder Paul Fishman.

== Background ==
Keyboardist Paul Fishman would record song ideas on a pocket tape recorder while walking or traveling near his home in Hampstead, London, and then sequence them on his Oberheim DSX back at his flat. He would work on the songs and present three or four at a time to his bandmates to jam out to at their next session. He said this song was probably inspired by a train or something he had read, and he took an almost complete demo of it with nearly finished lyrics to the session.

On the lyrics, Fishman said, "The sentiment of the song is really about the power of when people come together and express themselves through dancing and letting go. During the '80s, it was in its very early days but in the latter part of the decade the rave scene was pretty much the message in a nut shell. No, I don't think people generally understand messages but some get it so that's alright."

== Track listings ==
UK, European, and Australian 7-inch single

A. "The Politics of Dancing"
B. "Cruel World"

US, Canadian, and Japanese 7-inch single

A. "The Politics of Dancing" – 3:55
B. "Flex It!" – 3:57

UK, European, and Australian 12-inch single

A. "The Politics of Dancing" (extended version) – 6:36
B. "Cruel World" (extended version) – 5:30

US 12-inch single

A. "The Politics of Dancing" – 6:47
B. "Flex It!" – 5:25

Canadian 12-inch single

A. "The Politics of Dancing" (long version) – 6:47
B. "The Politics of Dancing" (short version) – 3:59

== Charts ==
Chart (1983–1984)	Peak position
Australia (Kent Music Report)	12
Canada Top Singles (RPM)	13
Europe (European Top 100 Singles)	19
Ireland (IRMA)	28
Netherlands (Single Top 100)	43
New Zealand (Recorded Music NZ)	12
South Africa (Springbok Radio)	19
Switzerland (Schweizer Hitparade)	28
UK Singles (Official Charts)	28
US Billboard Hot 100	24
US Dance/Disco Top 80 (Billboard)	8
US Rock Top Tracks (Billboard)	19
US Cash Box Top 100	23
West Germany (GfK)	25
