= Gregory-Portland Independent School District =

School district in Texas, United States

Address
- 1200 Broadway Boulevard Portland, Texas, 78374; United States

District information
- Grades: PK–12
- Schools: 6
- NCES District ID: 4821780

Students and staff
- Students: 4,963 (2023–2024)
- Teachers: 340.23 (on an FTE basis)
- Student–teacher ratio: 14.59:1

Other information
- Website: www.g-pisd.org

Gregory-Portland Independent School District is a public school district based in Portland, Texas (USA).

In addition to Portland, the district also serves the city of Gregory as well as the census-designated place of Tradewinds.

In 2009, the school district was rated "academically acceptable" by the Texas Education Agency.

== Schools ==
Gregory-Portland High School

- Gregory-Portland High School (Grades 9-12)
- Gregory-Portland Middle School (Grade 6-8)
- W. C. Andrews Elementary School (Grades K-5)
- Stephen F. Austin Elementary School (Grades PK-5)
- T. M. Clark Elementary School (Grades PK-5)
- East Cliff Elementary School (Grades PK-5)

A new facility, dubbed the Gregory-Portland Early Childhood Center, is under construction and scheduled to be completed by fall of 2024. Meant for Pre-K and Kindergarten-level children, it seeks to promote immersive learning with a series of interactive classrooms centered around specific themes.
