= List of LGBTQ-related films of 2005 =

This is a list of lesbian, gay, bisexual, transgender or queer-related films released in 2005. It contains theatrically released films that deal with important gay, lesbian, bisexual, transgender or queer characters or issues and may have same-sex romance or relationships as a plot device.

== Films ==
Title	Director	Country	Genre	Cast	Notes
20 Centimeters	Ramón Salazar	France; Spain	Musical, comedy	Mónica Cervera, Pablo Puyol, Migul O'Dogherty, Rossy de Palma, Pilar Bardem, Lola Dueñas and Najwa Nimri	a.k.a. 20-centímetros
29th and Gay	Carrie Preston	United States	Comedy	James Vasquez, Nicole Marcks, David McBean, Mike Doyle, Annie Hinton, Kali Rocha, Michael Emerson, Adam Greer, James Synjyn, Kurt Norby, Rob MacAuley, Ari Lerner, Edward Ortiz Vásquez, Zev Lerner, Rachel Pearson and Sandra Ellis-Troy	
50 Ways of Saying Fabulous	Stewart Main	New Zealand	Drama	Andrew Patterson, Harriet Beattie, Jay Collins, Georgia McNeil, Michael Dorman, Rima Te Wiata, George Mason, Ross McKellar and Stephanie McKellar-Smith	
Adam & Steve	Craig Chester	United States	Comedy	Craig Chester, Malcolm Gets, Parker Posey, Chris Kattan, Kristen Schaal, Julie Hagerty, Paul Sand, Noah Segan, Sally Kirkland and Jackie Beat	
Almost Normal	Marc Moody	United States	Comedy, drama	J. Andrew Keitch, Tim Hammer, Joan Lauckner, Nils Haaland, Kehry Anson Lane, Joel Egger, Virginia Smith, Brad Buffum, Mary Douglass, Steve Balsarini, John Brennan, Adam Jefferis, Katherine Nora Leroy, Stan Brown, Eric Smith and Paige Edwards	
Amnesia: The James Brighton Enigma	Denis Langlois	Canada	Drama	Dusan Dukic, Tyler Hall, Derek Lebrero, Maurizio Terrazzano, Karyne Lemieux, Philippe Provencher, Claudine Paquette, Neil De Albuquerque, Enrica Boucher, Karine Lavergne, Louise Laprade, Ginette Boivin, Stefan Perrault, Norman Helms, Henri Pardo, Louis Mauffette, Patrice D'Aragon, Étienne Meunier, Paul-Antoine Taillefer, Matt Holland, Eric Cabana, Francois Dupuy, Mariah Inger, Fernand Rainville, L. Kalo Gow, Helen King, Charlotte Charlot, Bruce Ramsay, Andrea Revel, Peter Xirogiannis, Dave Lines, John Dodge, Holly Gauthier-Frankel, Steven Turpin and Julian Casey	
Bam Bam and Celeste	Lorene Machado	United States	Comedy	Margaret Cho, Wayne Federman, Elaine Hendrix, Butch Klein, Katy Selverstone, Bruce Daniels, Sabrina Matthews, John Cho, Kali Rocha, Kathy Najimy, Jackie Kashian, Nisha Ganatra, Alan Cumming, Michael J. McKenna, Ryan Landry, Jane Lynch, Danny Hoch, Wilson Cruz, Chris Williams, Jackie Beat, Molly Bryant and Mark Vasconcellos	
Be with Me	Eric Khoo	Singapore	Drama	Ng Sway Ah, Sanwan Bin Rais, Theresa Poh Lin Chan, John Choong, Elizabeth Choy, Leong Kooi Eng, Lim Poey Huang, Seet Keng Yew, Shaun Koh and Ezann Lee	Based on Poh Lin Chan's real life
The Best of Secter and the Rest of Secter	Joel Secter	Canada	Documentary	David Secter	
Beyond Hatred	Olivier Meyrou	France	Documentary	Story of French couple seeking justice after the murder of their gay son, 29-year-old Francois Chenu	a.k.a. Au delà de la haine, won the Teddy Award for Best Documentary at the 2006 Berlin Film Festival.
The Blossoming of Maximo Oliveros	Auraeus Solito	Philippines	Comedy, drama	Nathan Lopez, Soliman Cruz, JR Valentin, Neil Ryan Sese and Ping Medina	a.k.a. Ang pagdadalaga ni Maximo Oliveros
Breakfast on Pluto	Neil Jordan	Ireland; United Kingdom	Comedy, drama	Cillian Murphy, Ruth Negga, Liam Neeson, Stephen Rea, Brendan Gleeson, Gavin Friday, Laurence Kinlan, Seamus Reilly, Eva Birthistle, Ian Hart, Steven Waddington, Ruth McCabe, Charlene McKenna, Liam Cunningham, Patrick McCabe, Bryan Ferry, Dominic Cooper and Paraic Breathnach	Screenplay by Jordan and Pat McCabe, based on the latter's novel of the same name
Brokeback Mountain	Ang Lee	Canada; United States	Drama	Heath Ledger, Jake Gyllenhaal, Michelle Williams, Anne Hathaway, Randy Quaid, Linda Cardellini, Anna Faris, David Harbour, Roberta Maxwell, Peter McRobbie, Kate Mara, Scott Michael Campbell, Graham Beckel	Adapted from short story of the same name by Annie Proulx
The Cabin Movie	Dylan Akio Smith	Canada	Comedy-drama	Arabella Bushnell, Ben Cotton, Brad Dryborough, Ryan Robbins, Justine Warrington, Erin Wells	
Capote	Bennett Miller	Canada; United States	Drama	Philip Seymour Hoffman, Catherine Keener, Clifton Collins Jr., Bruce Greenwood, Mark Pellegrino, Amy Ryan, Chris Cooper	Based on Gerald Clarke's biography of Truman Capote
Chai Lai (Dangerous Flowers)	Poj Arnon	Thailand	Action, comedy	Bongkoj Khongmalai, Supaksorn Chaimongkol, Kessarin Ektawatkul	Features a transgender villain portrayed by performance artist Wannasak "Kuck" Sirilar.
Cold Showers	Antony Cordier	France	Drama	Johan Libéreau, Salomé Stévenin, Pierre Perrier	a.k.a. Douche froides
Colour Me Kubrick	Brian W. Cook	United Kingdom; France	Comedy, drama	John Malkovich, Marisa Berenson, Jim Davidson, Richard E. Grant, Terence Rigby, Joe Van Moyland, Ken Russell, Peter Sallis, Shaun Parkes	
Crustacés et Coquillages	Olivier Ducastel, Jacques Martineau	France	Comedy	Valeria Bruni Tedeschi (credited as Valeria Bruni-Tedeschi), Gilbert Melki, Jean-Marc Barr, Jacques Bonnaffé, Romain Torres, Édouard Collin, Sabrina Seyvecou and Julien Weber	a.k.a. Cockles and Muscles and Côte d'Azur
C.R.A.Z.Y.	Jean-Marc Vallée	Canada	Drama	Marc-André Grondin, Michel Côté, Danielle Proulx, Pierre-Luc Brillant	
Dare	Adam Salky	United States	Short, drama	Adam Fleming, Michael Cassidy, Marla Burkholder, Terry Guerin, Carly Haines, Matt Lundy and Steve Sweigard	16 mins long it led later to a longer sequel, The Dare Project being filmed in 2017
David	Roberto Fiesco	Mexico	Short, erotic	Jorge Adrián Espíndola, Javier Escobar, Salvador Álvarez, Pilar Ruiz and Fernando Arroyo	14 mins long, winner of 'Best Short Film' at Torino International Gay & Lesbian Film Festival 2006
Deadly Skies	Sam Irvin	United States; Canada	Science fiction	Antonio Sabàto Jr., Rae Dawn Chong	
Destricted	Marina Abramović	United Kingdom; United States	Drama	Various	Short art-house porn films, 8 in US Version and 7 different on international version.
The Dying Gaul	Craig Lucas	United States	Drama	Patricia Clarkson, Peter Sarsgaard, Campbell Scott, Elizabeth Marvel, Bill Camp	Based on Lucas' Off-Broadway play of the same name
Eighteen	Richard Bell	Canada	Drama	Paul Anthony, Brendan Fletcher, Clarence Sponagle, Carly Pope, Mark Hildreth, David Beazely, Thea Gill, Alan Cumming and (voice of) Ian McKellen	
Eleven Men Out	Róbert Ingi Douglas	Iceland; Finland; United Kingdom	Comedy, drama	Björn Hlynur Haraldsson, Lilja Nótt þórarindóttir, Ammundur Ernst, Helgi Björnsson, Þorsteinn Bachmann	a.k.a. Strákarnir okkar
FAQs	Everett Lewis	United States	Drama	Joe Lia, Allen Louis and Lance Lee Davis	
The Family Stone	Thomas Bezucha	United States	Comedy, drama	Claire Danes, Diane Keaton, Rachel McAdams, Dermot Mulroney, Craig T. Nelson, Sarah Jessica Parker and Luke Wilson	
Fighting Tommy Riley	Eddie O'Flaherty	United States	Drama	J. P. Davis, Eddie Jones and Christina Chambers	
Flirting with Anthony	Christian Calson	United States	Drama	Daniel Cartier, Lowe Taylor, Ryan A. Allen, Andrew Sears, Mink Stole, Judy Tenuta, Brian Grillo, Don Allen, Ruby Boofont, Vicky Boofont, Alex Garner, Edward Hibbs, Heather Meyer, Mr. Dan, David Sivits and Carl Strecker	
Fremde Haut	Angelina Maccarone	Germany; Austria	Drama	Jasmin Tabatabai, Anneke Kim Sarnau, Navíd Akhavan and Georg Friedrich	a.k.a. Unveiled
The Gay Marriage Thing	Stephanie Higgins	United States	Documentary		
Gay Sex in the 70s	Joseph F. Lovett	United States	Documentary	Includes interviews with Robert Alvarez, Alvin Baltrop, Barton Beneš, Tom Bianchi, Mel Cheren, Arnie Kantrowitz, Larry Kramer, Lawrence Mass and Rodger McFarlane	
Go West	Ahmed Imamović	Bosnia and Herzegovina	Comedy, drama	Mario Drmać, Tarik Filipović, Rade Šerbedžija and Mirjana Karanović	
Happy Endings	Don Roos	United States	Comedy, drama	Lisa Kudrow, Steve Coogan, Tom Arnold, Jason Ritter, Maggie Gyllenhaal, Bobby Cannavale, Jesse Bradford, David Sutcliffe, Laura Dern and Sarah Clarke	
Hate Crime	Tommy Stovall	United States	Crime, drama	Seth Peterson, Bruce Davison, Chad Donella, Cindy Pickett, Brian J. Smith, Susan Blakely and Lin Shaye	
House of Himiko	Isshin Inudo	Japan	Drama	Jō Odagiri, Ko Shibasaki, Min Tanaka, Hidetoshi Nishijima, Torauemon Utazawa and Kira Aoyama	a.k.a. Mezon do Himiko
Imagine Me & You	Ol Parker	United States; United Kingdom; Germany	Comedy, drama	Piper Perabo, Lena Headey, Matthew Goode, Celia Imrie, Anthony Head, Darren Boyd, Sue Johnston, Boo Jackson, Sharon Horgan, Eva Birthistle, Vinette Robinson, Ben Miles, Mona Hammond and Rick Warden	
Istanbul Tales	Selim Demirdelen, Kudret Sabancı, Ümit Ünal, Yücel Yolcu, Ömür Atay	Turkey	Drama, romance	Altan Erkekli, Özgü Namal, Mehmet Günsür, Erkan Can, Azra Akın, Çetin Tekindor, Vahide Perçin (credited as Vahide Gördüm), Nejat İşler, Hilal Aslan, Yelda Reynaud, Şevket Çoruh, Güven Kıraç, İsmail Hacıoğlu, Selen Ucer, Hasibe Eren, Nurgül Yeşilçay, Selim Akgul, Erdem Akakce, İdil Üner and Fikret Kuşkan	It is made up of 5 segments, its original Turkish title is Anlat İstanbul which means "Tell me Istanbul".
Keller - Teenage Wasteland	Eva Urthaler	Italy; Germany; Australia	Drama	Elisabetta Rocchetti, Ludwig Trepte, Sergej Moya, Georg Friedrich, Birgit Doll, Ana Stefanovic, Lisa Loibl, Anita Schmid and Sarah Trotz	Also known as Out of Hand
The King and the Clown	Jun-ik Lee	South Korea	Drama	Kam Woo-sung, Jung Jin-young, Lee Joon-gi, Kang Sung-yeon and Yoo Hae-jin	a.k.a. Wang-ui namja
Kinky Boots	Julian Jarrold	United States; United Kingdom	Comedy, drama	Joel Edgerton, Chiwetel Ejiofor, Sarah-Jane Potts, Jemima Rooper, Nick Frost, Linda Bassett, Robert Pugh, Ewan Hooper, Stephen Marcus, Mona Hammond, Kellie Bright, Joanna Scanlan, Geoffrey Streatfeild and Leo Bill	
Kiss Kiss Bang Bang	Shane Black	United States	Comedy	Robert Downey Jr., Val Kilmer, Michelle Monaghan, Corbin Bernsen, Dash Mihok, Larry Miller, Rockmond Dunbar, Shannyn Sossamon and Angela Lindvall	
Loggerheads	Tim Kirkman	United States	Drama	Kip Pardue, Michael Kelly, Tess Harper, Bonnie Hunt, Chris Sarandon, Robin Weigert and Michael Learned	
A Love to Hide	Christian Faure	France	Drama	Jérémie Renier, Louise Monot, Bruno Todeschini, Nicolas Gob, Charlotte de Turckheim, Michel Jonasz, Olivier Saladin and Yulian Vergov	a.k.a. Un amour à taire
Männer, Helden, schwule Nazis	Rosa von Praunheim	Germany	Documentary	Rainer Fromm, Winfried Bonengel, Michael Kühnen, Bernd-Ulrich Hergemöller, Jörg Fischer, Bela Ewald Althans and Rüdiger Lautmann	
Masahista	Brillante Mendoza	Philippines	Drama	Coco Martin, Jaclyn Jose, Allan Paule, Katherine Luna, R.U. Miranda, Aaron Rivera, Arianne Camille Rivera, Ronaldo Bertubin, Norman Pineda, John Baltazar, Jan-el Esturco, Erlinda Cruz, Rose Mendoza, Mary Anne de la Cruz, Maximiano Sultan, Josefina Punzalan, Jayson Colis, Randell Reyes, Paolo Rivero, Kristoffer King, Marvin Bautista, Adan Bolivar, Kim Redoble, J.D. Basco, Joe Armas and Jetro Rafael	a.k.a. The Masseur
The Mostly Unfabulous Social Life of Ethan Green	George Bamber	United States	Comedy	Daniel Letterle, Meredith Baxter, David Monahan, Dean Shelton, Diego Serrano, Shanola Hampton, Joel Brooks and Richard Riehle	
My Brother... Nikhil	Onir	India	Drama	Sanjay Suri, Juhi Chawla, Victor Banerjee, Lillete Dubey, Purab Kohli, Dipannita Sharma and Shayan Munshi	
My Fair Son	Cui Zi'en	China	Drama	Junrui Wang, Weiming Wang, Yu Bo, Guifeng Wang and Ziqiang Li	
My Super 8 Season	Alessandro Avellis	France	Drama	Axel Philippon, Célia Pilastre, Roman Girelli, Magali Domec, Antoine Mory, Nicolas Quilliard, Thierry Barèges, Jean-Pierre Frankfower, Nicolas Christin, Nicolas Villena, Jean-Marc Cozic and Rivka Braun	a.k.a. Ma saison super 8
Navarasa	Santosh Sivan	India	Drama	P. Shwetha, Khushbu, Bobby Darling and Ejji K. Umamahesh	
October Moon	Jason Paul Collum	United States	Horror	Judith O'Dea, Brinke Stevens	
Queens	Manuel Gómez Pereira	Spain	Comedy	Verónica Forqué, Carmen Maura, Marisa Paredes, Mercedes Sampietro, Betiana Blum, Gustavo Salmerón, Unax Ugalde, Hugo Silva, Daniel Hendler, Paco León, Raúl Jiménez, Tito Valverde, Lluís Homar, Jorge Perugorría, Ginés García Millán, José Luis García Pérez, Mariano Peña and Yolanda Alzola	a.k.a. Reinas
The Reception	John G. Young	United States	Comedy, drama	Maggie Burkwit, Chris Burmester, Darien Sills-Evans, Wayne Lamont Sims and Pamela Stewart	
Red Doors	Georgia Lee	United States	Comedy, drama	Tzi Ma, Jacqueline Kim, Elaine Kao, Kathy Shao-Lin Lee, Sebastian Stan, Freda Foh Shen, Jayce Bartok, Rossif Sutherland, Mia Riverton	
Rent	Chris Columbus	United States	Musical, drama	Rosario Dawson, Taye Diggs, Wilson Jermaine Heredia, Jesse L. Martin, Idina Menzel, Adam Pascal, Anthony Rapp, Tracie Thoms	Based on the Broadway musical of the same name by Jonathan Larson
The Russian Dolls	Cédric Klapisch	France; United Kingdom	Comedy, drama	Romain Duris, Audrey Tautou, Cécile de France, Kelly Reilly, Kevin Bishop, Lucy Gordon, Aïssa Maïga, Evgenia Obraztsova, Irene Montalà, Gary Love, Frédérique Bel, Pierre Cassignard and Olivier Saladin	a.k.a. Les poupées russes
Say Uncle	Peter Paige	United States	Comedy, drama	Peter Paige, Kathy Najimy, Anthony Clark, Melanie Lynskey, Gabrielle Union and Lisa Edelstein	
Starcrossed	James Burkhammer	United States	Drama	Marshall Allman, J. B. Ghuman, Jr., John Wesley Shipp, Simon Ragaine, Derek Sean Lara, Darcy DeMoss, Gina Rodgers and Torrey DeVitto, Victor Bevine, Colette Divine and Steven Guy	
That Man: Peter Berlin	Jim Tushinski	United States	Documentary	Interviews with; Peter Berlin, Robert Boulanger, Rick Castro, Lawrence Helman, John F. Karr, Armistead Maupin, Daniel Nicoletta, Wakefield Poole, Robert W. Richards, John Waters and Jack Wrangler	
Third Man Out	Ron Oliver	United States; Canada	Crime	Chad Allen, Sebastian Spence and Jack Wetherall	
Time to Leave	François Ozon	France	Drama	Melvil Poupaud, Jeanne Moreau, Valeria Bruni Tedeschi, Daniel Duval, Marie Rivière and Christian Sengewald	a.k.a. Le temps qui reste
Transamerica	Duncan Tucker	United States	Comedy, drama	Felicity Huffman, Kevin Zegers, Graham Greene, Fionnula Flanagan, Burt Young, Carrie Preston, Elizabeth Peña, Venida Evans, Teala Dunn, Calpernia Addams, Stella Maeve, Raynor Scheine, Danny Burstein and Andrea James	
Two Drifters	João Pedro Rodrigues	Portugal	Drama	João Carreira, Ana Cristina De Oliveira, Nuno Gil, Teresa Madruga	
We Are Dad	Michel Horvat	United States	Documentary	Roger Croteau, Steven Lofton, Rosie O'Donnell, Margaret Fischl, Judith Stacey	
Whole New Thing	Amnon Buchbinder	Canada	Comedy, drama	Aaron Webber, Daniel MacIvor, Robert Joy, Rebecca Jenkins and Callum Keith Rennie	
WTC View	Brian Sloan	United States	Drama	Michael Urie, Jeremy Beazlie, Lucas Papaelias, Elizabeth Kapplow, Michael Linstroth, Nick Potenzieri and Jay Gillespie	Based on Sloan's play of the same name
A Year Without Love	Anahí Berneri	Argentina	Drama	Juan Minujín, Mimí Ardú, Carlos Echevarría, Bárbara Lombardo, Javier Van de Couter, Osmar Núñez, Ricardo Merkin, Carlos Portaluppi, Mónica Cabrera, Ricardo Moriello and Juan Carlos Ricci	a.k.a. Un año sin amor
Zerophilia	Martin Curland	United States	Comedy	Taylor Handley, Dustin Seavey, Alison Folland, Kyle Schmid, Rebecca Mozo, Adam Zolotin, Gina Bellman, Chris Meyer, Marieh Delfino, Kelly LeBrock and Rick Stear	
