= Gay Sex in the 70s =

- Directed by: Joseph Lovett
- Produced by: Michael Sean Kaminsky; Joseph Lovett
- Starring: Tom Bianchi; Larry Kramer; Rodger McFarlane
- Cinematography: Michael Sean Kaminsky; Joseph Lovett
- Edited by: Jason Szabo
- Music by: Art Labriola
- Production companies: Lovett Productions; Heartlove Productions
- Distributed by: Lovett Productions; Wolfe Video
- Release dates: April 26, 2005 (Tribeca Film Festival); June 17, 2005 (United States)
- Running time: 67 minutes
- Country: United States
- Language: English

Gay Sex in the 70s is a 2005 American documentary film about gay sexual culture in New York City in the 1970s. The film was directed by Joseph Lovett and encompasses the twelve years of sexual freedom bookended by the Stonewall riots of 1969 and the recognition of AIDS in 1981, and features interviews with Larry Kramer, Tom Bianchi, Barton Lidice Beneš, Rodger McFarlane, and many others.

The film uses archival footage and interviews to describe the world of gay anonymous and casual sex in the settings of discotheques, bathhouses, bars and dark rooms, Fire Island and more.

== Synopsis ==
The film opens with a rapid montage of visuals that transport people back to the 1970s in and around Greenwich Village. Driving disco music of the time sets the pace. Using intimate interviews, the story of gay sex in the 1970s develops through characters such as Larry Kramer, Scott Bromley, Barton Benes, and Rodger McFarlane. These characters begin to expand the elements that were visually introduced. They talk about the public sex: the streets, the piers, and the trucks.

This outpouring of sexuality is put into perspective when it is shown what gay life was like before 1969. How the political climate of the time influenced sexual expression. They discuss Vietnam, women's rights and especially Stonewall in 1969. The interviewees explore the experience of ‘Escaping to New York’. What some of the reasons they left the cities they had spent their entire lives in were, how things changed after the Sexual Revolution had begun.

New York in the 1970s continued the sexual liberation birthed during the free love movement of the 1960s. Playboy magazine flourished like never before as well as more explicit rival magazines Penthouse and Hustler, the Broadway show ‘Hair’, ‘Oh Calcutta’ and the highly controversial ‘Dionysus in ’69′ were produced. There was a bombardment of sexual stimuli.

For the first time in history, gay pornography began receiving widespread attention. But how did pornography compare with actual sex occurring in the seventies? ‘Couldn’t compete – life was a pornographic movie’ Rodger McFarland explains.

Sex had become the great equalizer. Young men of all financial strata and backgrounds met in New York to experience a freedom of sexual expression that hadn't been known since ancient Rome. Just a few years before these same men had assumed that their futures were to be in the suburbs via the marriage altar. They found themselves cruising the streets, frequenting gay bars, having sex everywhere from the privacy of their homes, to the orgiastic atmosphere of the bathhouses, to semi-public sexual meeting places like the trucks and the piers. At some venues such as the Continental Baths on the Upper West Side performers such as Bette Midler wowed towel clad audiences.

Paradise Garage opened its doors. A heaven for young men and women of all colors and gay men, it birthed disco music. Other clubs soon followed – from the famous ‘Studio 54′, to the infamous ‘Saint’. Men danced their nights away in an intoxicating communal brotherhood.

How did drugs fit into all this experimentation? Even though HIV had not yet become a threat, what kinds of STDs were being experienced? What were the challenges of all this available sex? In this new birth control age antibiotics were consumed in ever increasing amounts and as long as you were ready to party for the next weekend in the Pines, that was considered a clinical cure.

By the 1970s Fire Island had become the summer paradise of choice for gay men. People from all over the world flew in to enjoy the outlandish parties, partake of sex on the beach and dance under the moonlight. But as the late 1970s partied on, there came to be talk of antibiotic resistant strains of bacteria and some men privately began to wonder ‘had they gone too far too fast?’ The election of the conservative Republican Ronald Reagan in 1980 as well as Disco Demolition Night which helped bring about the decline of Disco music in the United States and the rise of the Religious Right in the early 1980s seemed to signal a backlash against the liberal atmosphere of the previous decade and the sexual revolution.

In June 1981, just twelve years after the Stonewall Riots, an article appeared in the New York Times that would soon put the brakes on this unprecedented era of sexual freedom. It was by Dr. Lawrence Altman about an unusual cancer seeming to affect gay men – a cancer that soon came to be known as AIDS. While at first many simply brushed off the new reports and continued to party on, by the mid-1980s with the rising death toll it became impossible to ignore and one of the results from the new disease was the New York City Health department closing all of the gay bathhouses in 1985. Community and friendships formed by the energy and sexual freedom gave gay men the ability to bond together and work as a strong, cohesive community. They sounded the first public health alarms and formed groups such as GMHC that have helped and continue to help thousands of men and women living with HIV to this day.

The film returns to the present day, 2004. Our characters explore what they gained from being alive in New York during the brief period of unencumbered sexuality that was life in New York during the 1970s, what the legacy of that time of sexual freedom is and how it continues to affect young people today.

== Cast ==
The following people are interviewed for the documentary.

- Robert Alvarez
- Alvin Baltrop
- Barton Benes
- Tom Bianchi
- Mel Cheren
- Arnie Kantrowitz
- Larry Kramer
- Lawrence Mass
- Rodger McFarlane
- Susan Tomkin
- Richard A. Lynch
- Ken Unger

== Awards ==
The film was awarded the GayVN Award for Best Alternative Release of 2006.

== See also ==
- 1970s in LGBT rights
