= That Man: Peter Berlin =

- Theatrical release poster
- Directed by: Jim Tushinski
- Produced by: Lawrence Helman; Jim Tushinski
- Starring: Peter Berlin
- Cinematography: Jim Tushinski
- Music by: Jack Curtis Dubowsky
- Distributed by: Gorilla Factory Productions
- Release date: 2005
- Running time: 80 minutes
- Country: United States
- Language: English
- Box office: $55,398

That Man: Peter Berlin is a 2005 documentary about the popular gay icon Peter Berlin directed by Jim Tushinski. The documentary had its world premiere at the 2005 Berlin International Film Festival. The film received generally positive reviews.

== Synopsis ==
In the documentary, Berlin narrates his own life in various candid interviews. Many other artists (porn stars, photographers, writers, contemporaries) comment on his legacy in gay culture. John Waters says in the documentary that Berlin is "Dinah Shore with a hard-on", while filmmaker Rick Castro opines that he is "the Greta Garbo of porn."

Archival clips are shown of his only two feature films: Nights in Black Leather and That Boy. The movie was filmed on location in Berlin's San Francisco apartment.

== Cast ==
All appearing as themselves:

- Peter Berlin
- Robert Boulanger (actor)
- Rick Castro (photographer)
- Lawrence Helman (producer)
- John F. Karr (writer)
- Armistead Maupin (writer)
- Daniel Nicoletta (photographer)
- Wakefield Poole (film director)
- Robert W. Richards (writer)
- John Waters (filmmaker)
- Jack Wrangler (actor)

== Reception ==
Metacritic, which uses a weighted average, assigned the film a score of 64 out of 100, indicating "generally favorable". On the review aggregator website Rotten Tomatoes, 93% of 14 critics' reviews are positive.

Nathan Lee from The New York Times said, "Vivid reminiscences from John Waters, Armistead Maupin, the pornographic auteur Wakefield Poole and the artist Robert Richards elevate That Man: Peter Berlin into a minor classic of demimonde hagiography." Melissa Anderson wrote in Time Out that "although Berlin, now 63, is no demure candle in the wind, he's no bitter flameout, either; generous and compassionate, the film ties up Berlin's life in one nice package."

Leslie Felperin from Variety Magazine commented the film "represents a workable, if slightly reticent documentary portrait of the titular '70s pin-up and porn star, once famous for his bobbed hair and a protuberant crotch; some audiences may bemoan what lay beneath Berlin's tight trousers is hardly seen." Film critic Jim Healy said "despite Berlin's frankness about his personal love life and his preference for being watched when he's not having sex, the Garbo of gay porn remains elusive, largely because Tushinski doesn't seem to see the ironies and contradictions in his subject's life."

Mark Fagan from The Austin Chronicle observed that "he wasn't afraid of portraying the mundane aspects of the gay scene in his films, along with the not-so-mundane sex that would follow; Berlin flaunted his sexuality through his photography and films and, of course, by displaying his bulging crotch, and was inspirational to less open members of the gay community." Ed Gonzalez wrote in Slant Magazine that "one might peg the man for a sex fiend, but what's revealing about Tushinski's exposé is how mild-mannered this 'Dutch boy' comes across."

== Awards ==
In 2005, the film won the "Audience Award" for Documentaries at the Milan International Lesbian and Gay Film Festival and the Austin Gay and Lesbian International Film Festival. It won the Jury Award for Best Documentary at the 2005 Reykjavík Lesbian and Gay Film Festival. the 2005 Honolulu Rainbow Film Festival, the 2005 Reel Identities Film Festival - New Orleans, and the 2005 Fire Island Film and Video Festival. All awarded to film director Jim Tushinski.

== Release ==
The documentary had its world premiere at the 2005 Berlin International Film Festival. The film was released on DVD in North America by Water Bearer Films in 2006.

== See also ==
- Nights in Black Leather
- That Boy
- List of LGBTQ-related films of 2005
- List of male performers in gay porn films
