= Stanley Stellar =

American photographer

Stanley Stellar (born 1945) is an American photographer, living in Manhattan, who has photographed gay men in the West Village there since 1976. His work is included in the collection of Harvard Art Museums, as well as in the Artifacts at the End of a Decade portfolio, a copy of which is held in the collection of the Museum of Modern Art in New York.

== Life and work ==
Stellar was born in New York City, growing up in Brooklyn in the 1950s and 1960s. He studied graphic design and photography at Parsons School of Design in New York City then began working as art director at Art Direction, an advertising agency.

In 1976, Stellar purchased a professional camera and began photographing the gay scene on the streets of Manhattan's West Village including Christopher Street, and on the Christopher Street Pier where men cruised for sex.

== Publications ==
=== Books of work by Stellar ===
- The Beauty of All Men, Photographs 1976–2011. All Saints, 2011. ISBN 9783900361044.
- Into the Light: Photographs of the NYC Gay Pride Day from the 70s Till Today. Bruno Gmuender, 2018. ISBN 978-3959852753.

== Collections ==
Stellar's work is held in the following permanent collections: Harvard Art Museums, Harvard University, Cambridge, Massachusetts: 1 print (as of 5 September 2022), Museum of Modern Art, New York: 1 photograph, part of Artifacts at the End of a Decade (as of 5 September 2022), Albright-Knox Art Gallery, Buffalo; The Fogg Museum, Harvard Art Museums, Boston; The Yale University Art Gallery.

== Exhibitions ==
- 2011. "Stanley Stellar: A Photographer". Curated by Peter Weiermair. Leslie-Lohman Museum of Art. New York City
- 2020. "“Curated” by Social Networks - protest of censorship of Human Body in Social Networks". Curated by Igor Zeiger. Beam Collective gallery. Tel Aviv
- 2023 "Copy Machine Manifestos: Artists Who Make Zines" curated by Drew Sawyer, Brooklyn Museum, New York City

== Films ==
- Stanley Stellar: Here For This Reason (2019) – Short Stories (HuffPost and RYOT Films); short film written and directed by Eric Leven

== See also ==
- Alvin Baltrop
- Leonard Fink
