= Shari Diamond =

American photographer and artist focused on LGBTQ+ issues

Shari Diamond (born 1961) is a queer American feminist photographic artist and educator. Diamond uses they/them gender pronouns. Diamond was born in Miami Beach, Florida and earned an M.A. in Photography from New York University / International Center of Photography.

== Career and artistic contributions ==
Diamond’s work incorporates photography and digital technology and explores difference as it relates to social, sexual, and political constructs. They have had artist residencies at Blue Mountain Center, Saltonstall Arts Colony, Studio Kura, and the Millay Colony for the Arts. Diamond’s work is in the permanent collection of the Leslie-Lohman Museum of Art and in private collections.

- The 60-Year Project, 2021-2022. The 60 Year Project represents 60 moments throughout 60 years of Diamond's life. The images are based on photos redrawn digitally to create "a silhouette captured in time."
- If You See Something, Say Something, 2019. Curated by Vincent Cianni, Shari Diamond, Stephanie Heimann Roland, and Sabine Meyer. Group photography exhibition addressing issues of racism, sexism, violence, immigration, the environment and climate change.
- Re Imagining Relations, 2019. The book utilizes laser cuts of photos of synagogues and mosques to combine the images and highlight the parallels between Islam and Judaism. Printed at Ofset Yapimevi, Istanbul Turkey. Edition of 530.
- Out of the Blue, 2016. Working with cyanotype and origami paper cranes. In her book Jill Enfield's Guide to Photographic Alternative Processes: Popular Historical and Contemporary Techniques, Jill Enfield writes that Diamond "became fascinated with the symbolism of hope for peace using paper cranes. Shari feels that by using the cyanotype process, the images incorporate process, time, reflection and contemplation.”
- Re Imagining Relations, 2011. Combining photographs taken at the Grand Mosque of Paris, where Jews were protected during the German Occupation, and photographs taken in synagogues and mosques throughout Paris and Istanbul, Diamond constructed new spaces to "explore the potential of montage to highlight similarities, explore differences, and visualize a conversion of dichotomies into coexistence." Diamond cites Israeli author David Grossman as an inspiration for this work. In his book Writing in the Dark, Grossman speaks of the potential of a "literary approach" — the need for a compassionate perspective in the negotiation of diverse conflicts of the present.
- Hidden Children, 1993. Edited by Shari Diamond and Hana Iverson, this artist's book includes writing and photography about the condition of being 'hidden', amidst dysfunctional family, racial and/or sexual bias, abuse, illness, and economic struggle. The book was reviewed by archivist and curator Judith Hoffberg in Umbrella: "This is a most remarkable book work, one in which the word 'hidden' has so many ramifications, which touch the heart and the soul of the reader. This book should be in the bookshops of all Museums of Tolerance, of the Holocaust, and of Genocide. This book should be in the bookshops of all women and men—it has universal significance.”

== Selected exhibitions ==
Diamond's work has been exhibited in galleries and museums nationally and internationally, including Art Projects International, Gallery at Hastings on the Hudson, Leslie-Lohman Museum of Art, Westbeth Art Gallery.

- The Dorsky Museum, Hudson Valley Artists 2024: Bibliography. Curated by Sophie Landres, 2024.
- Newburgh Open Studios, The 60 Year Project., NY, 2022.
- The Lace Mill Arts Council, Women Photographers Collective of Hudson Valley, Kingston, NY, 2022.
- Leslie-Lohman Museum, Art After Stonewall. Curated by Jonathan Weinberg, Tyler Cann, and Drew Sawyer, 2019.
- Here Arts Center, New York, NY. Queer As I. Curated by Dan Halm, 2019.
- Leslie-Lohman Museum of Art, Leonard Fink: Out of the Camera. Curated by Jonathan Weinberg, 2018.
- Dowd Gallery, SUNY Cortland, Remember/Reimagined. Curated by Erika Fowler-Decatur, 2012.
- Beit Ha’ir Center for Urban Culture, Tel Aviv, IL. inSalaam inShalom. Curated by threeasfour, 2012.

== Publications ==
- Briggs, Chloe. Seventy-two Assignments: The Foundation Course in Art and Design Today. PCA Press, 2013.
- Caffyn, Kelley. Forbidden Subjects: Self-Portraits by Lesbian Artists. Midmarch Press, 1992.
- Enfield, Jill. Jill Enfield’s Guide to Photographic Alternative Processes Popular Historical and Contemporary Techniques. Routledge, 2020.
- Gonzalo, C and N. Parness. Queer Holdings: A Survey of the Leslie-Lohman Museum Collection. Hirmer Publishers, 2019.
- Meskimmon, Marsha. The Art of Reflection. Women Artists’ Self-Portraiture in the Twentieth Century. Scarlet Press, 1996.
- Weinberg, Jonathan. Art After Stonewall, 1969-1989. Rizzoli Electa, 2019.
