= List of LGBTQ-related films of 1974 =

This is a list of lesbian, gay, bisexual, transgender or queer-related films released in 1974. It contains theatrically released films that deal with important gay, lesbian, bisexual, transgender or queer characters or issues and may have same-sex romance or relationships as a plot device.

== Films ==
Title	Director	Country	Genre	Cast	Notes
125 Rooms of Comfort	Patrick Loubert	Canada	Drama	Tim Henry, Jackie Burroughs, Robert Warner, Robert A. Silverman (credited as Robert Silverman), Les Barker, Sean Sullivan, Michael Lewis, Jackie Crossland, Marcia Diamond, Russ Little, Leonard Glenn, Bob Vinci and Enza Vinci	
Arabian Nights	Pier Paolo Pasolini	Italy; France	Drama, comedy, fantasy	Ninetto Davoli, Franco Citti, Franco Merli, Tessa Bouché, Ines Pellegrini, Margareth Clementi, Luigina Rocchi, Alberto Argentino, Francesco Paolo Governale, Salvatore Sapienza, Zeudi Biasolo, Barbara Grandi, Elisabetta Genovese and Gioacchino Castellini	Based on the folk tale collection One Thousand and One Nights
A Bigger Splash	Jack Hazan	United Kingdom	Biography		Biopic about the breakup of David Hockney and Peter Schlesinger
Born Innocent	Donald Wrye	United States	Drama	Linda Blair, Richard Jaeckel, Kim Hunter	
Butley	Harold Pinter	United States; United Kingdom	Drama	Alan Bates, Jessica Tandy, Richard O'Callaghan	Screenplay by Simon Gray, based on his stage play of the same name
Caged Heat	Jonathan Demme	United States	Drama	Erica Gavin, Roberta Collins, Barbara Steele	Women in prison film with lesbian subplot
Conversation Piece	Luchino Visconti	Italy; France	Drama	Burt Lancaster, Helmut Berger, Silvana Mangano, Claudia Marsani, Stefano Patrizi, Elvira Cortese, Philippe Hersent, Guy Tréjan, Jean-Pierre Zola, Umberto Raho, Enzo Fiermonte, Romolo Valli, Dominique Sanda and Claudia Cardinale	
The Devil Queen	Antonio Carlos da Fontoura	Brazil	Drama	Milton Gonçalves, Stepan Nercessian, Nelson Xavier, Odete Lara	a.k.a. A Rainha Diaba
Female Trouble	John Waters	United States	Comedy, crime, horror	Divine, David Lochary, Mary Vivian Pearce, Mink Stole, Hilary Taylor, Edith Massey, Cookie Mueller, Susan Walsh, Michael Potter, Ed Peranio, Paul Swift, George Figgs, Susan Lowe, Channing Wilroy and Elizabeth Coffey	
Je Tu Il Elle	Chantal Akerman	Belgium; France	Drama	Chantal Akerman, Niels Arestrup and Claire Wauthion	
The Killer Reserved Nine Seats	Giuseppe Bennati	Italy	Crime	Rosanna Schiaffino, Chris Avram, Eva Czemerys, Lucretia Love, Paola Senatore, Gaetano Russo, Andrea Scotti, Eduardo Filippone, Antonio Guerra, Howard Ross and Janet Agren	
Lenny	Bob Fosse	United States	Biographical drama	Dustin Hoffman, Valerie Perrine	
Mi hijo no es lo que parece	Angelino Fons	Spain	Comedy, musical	Celia Gámez, Esperanza Roy, Jorge Lago, José Sazatornil, Tony Soler, Eloy Arenas, Pilar Gómez Ferrer, Luis Baggiani and Victoria Hernández	
Montreal Main	Frank Vitale	Canada	Drama	Frank Vitale, Stephen Lack, Peter Brawley, Allan Moyle, John Sutherland and Jackie Holden	
The Night Porter	Liliana Cavani	Italy	Drama	Dirk Bogarde, Charlotte Rampling, Philippe Leroy, Gabriele Ferzetti, Giuseppe Addobbati, Isa Miranda, Nino Bignamini, Marino Masé, Amedeo Amodio, Piero Vida, Geoffrey Copleston, Manfred Freyberger, Ugo Cardea, Hilda Gunther, Nora Ricci, Piero Mazzinghi and Kai-Siegfried Seefeld	
Score	Radley Metzger	United States	Erotic Drama	Casey Donovan, Lynn Lowry	
That Boy	Peter Berlin	United States	Erotica	Peter Berlin, Arron Black	
A Very Natural Thing	Christopher Larkin	United States	Drama	Robert Joel, Curt Gareth, Bo White, Anthony McKay, Marilyn Meyers, Jay Pierce, Barnaby Rudge, A. Bailey Chapin, Scott Eisman, Michael Kell, Sheila Rock, Linda Weitz, Robert Grillo, Kurt Brandt, George Diaz, Deborah Trowbridge, Jesse Trowbridge and Vito Russo	
Vampyres	José Ramón Larraz	United Kingdom	Horror	Marianne Morris, Anulka Dziubinska (credited as Anulka), Murray Brown, Brian Deacon, Sally Faulkner, Michael Byrne, Karl Lanchbury, Margaret Heald, Gerald Case, Bessie Love and Elliott Sullivan	
