= Leonard Fink =

American photographer

- Born: 1930; New York City, United States
- Died: 1992 (aged 61–62); New York City, United States
- Education: Louisiana State University (BA); New York Law School (JD)
- Occupations: Photographer, lawyer
- Employer: New York City Transit Authority
- Known for: Documenting LGBT culture in NYC (1967–1992)
- Notable work: Pride Marches, West Village gay bar culture, Hudson River piers)

Leonard Fink (1930–1992) was an American photographer who documented his own LGBT culture in New York City from 1967 to 1992. He photographed the annual Pride Marches beginning with the first in 1970; the West Village's gay bar culture; and in particular the abandoned West Side piers where men cruised and had sexual encounters.

He neither published nor exhibited his work in his lifetime, but posthumously exhibitions have been held in the Schwules Museum in Berlin and at the Leslie-Lohman Museum of Art in New York City. A book, Leonard Fink: Coming Out, was published on the occasion of the latter exhibition. His work is held in the archive of the Lesbian, Gay, Bisexual & Transgender Community Center in New York City.

== Early life and education ==
Fink was born in New York City in 1930 and grew up on the West Side of Manhattan. He was raised an Orthodox Jew but as an adult he was non-observant. His father and older brother were physicians. Fink gained an undergraduate degree from Louisiana State University, then served in the army in the early 1950s. Later he gained a Juris Doctor degree from New York Law School.

== Photography ==
Fink was self-taught in photography, using a 35 mm camera and a home-made darkroom in his small apartment on West 92nd street.

His first photographs date from 1954, of friends, holidays in Europe, and scenes in New York City. "His photographs of gay life begin with groups of gay men photographed in Greenwich Village in 1967" and he continued to focus on his own LGBT culture in New York City throughout the 1970s and 1980s. He photographed many of the annual Pride Marches beginning with the first in 1970—the Christopher Street Liberation Day march; the West Village's gay bar culture, especially on West Street; and in particular the abandoned West Side Hudson River piers, such as Christopher Street Pier. The rundown piers served as a space for gay men to interact and Fink photographed the cruising and sexual encounters, including his own. He made both candid photographs as well as those where his subjects knew they were being photographed. Elsewhere too, he often made self-portraits.

Fink neither published nor exhibited his photographs in his lifetime, sharing them only with close friends. At the time of his death he had over 5,000 prints and around 25,000 negatives.

== Personal life ==
Little is known about him. Most of his working life was spent as a lawyer for the New York City Transit Authority, where he investigated and defended the city against accident claims. "He lived frugally, spending much of his income on photographic supplies."

Fink was "well known in the gay scene of the West Village of the early 1980s" He "was a colorful and ubiquitous character in the Village and at Pride parades, usually appearing on rollerskates in short cut-offs, and a tight t-shirt with cameras always around his neck. He sometimes arrived on a bicycle or a motorcycle."

He died of complications relating to AIDS.

== Legacy ==
His complete photographic archive, consisting of work from 1954 to 1992, is held in the archive of the Lesbian, Gay, Bisexual & Transgender Community Center in New York City.

== Publications ==
- Leonard Fink: Coming Out: Photographs of gay liberation and the New York waterfront. Biel/Bienne, Switzerland: Clandestin, 2014. Edited by Judith Luks and Thomas Schoenberger. ISBN 9783905297461. With a preface by Rich Wandel and an essay by Jonathan Weinberg ("Leonard Fink: making a scene") and by Schoenberger ("The sexualization of place—the piers between ruin and reoccupation"). Text in English and German. Published on the occasion of an exhibition at the Schwules Museum, Berlin.

== Exhibitions ==
- Leonard Fink Coming Out, Schwules Museum, Berlin, 2014/15
- Out for the Camera: the Self-Portraits of Leonard Fink, Leslie-Lohman Museum of Art, New York City, 2018. Work by Fink juxtaposed with work by Gail Thacker, Tee A. Corinne, Del LaGrace Volcano, Shari Diamond, Stanley Stellar and Frank Hallam. Included hundreds of images "from self-portraits in mirrors to gay bar culture" and Pride marches.

== See also ==
- Alvin Baltrop
- Diana Davies (photographer)
- Peter Hujar
