= Hell's Angels '69 =

1970 film by Lee Madden

- Directed by: Lee Madden; Conny Van Dyke
- Written by: Don Tait
- Story by: Tom Stern; Jeremy Slate
- Starring: Tom Stern; Jeremy Slate; Conny Van Dyke; Steve Sandor
- Cinematography: Paul Lohmann
- Edited by: Gene Ruggiero
- Music by: Tony Bruno
- Distributed by: American International Pictures (US)
- Release dates: September 10, 1969 (New York City); July 15, 1970 (Sweden)
- Country: USA
- Language: English
- Budget: $375,000

Hell's Angels '69 is a 1969 Outlaw biker film directed by Lee Madden and Conny Van Dyke. The film stars Tom Stern, Jeremy Slate, Conny Van Dyke, and Steve Sandor.

In the film, two brothers plan to rob a casino in Las Vegas, Nevada. They want to manipulate the Hells Angels into causing a disturbance outside the casino at the time of the robbery, so they devote time in winning the Angels' trust. The heist goes as planned, but the brothers soon argue over sharing their loot. Meanwhile, the Angels have figured out that they were betrayed by their supposed friends. They are pursuing the traitors.

== Plot ==
Two brothers, Chuck and Wes, plan to rob the Caesars Palace Casino in Las Vegas, Nevada. They decide to use the Oakland Hells Angels as dupes in their plans by pretending to be members of an East Coast motorcycle club/gang and winning the Angels' trust, and then using them to create a disturbance outside the casino while they are inside robbing it. While gaining the trust of the Angels, Wes becomes romantically involved with Betsy, one of the Angels' "old ladies" who has a rocky relationship with the Angel Tramp.

Chuck and Wes's plan to rob Caesars Palace first involves them persuading the Angels to make a weekend run to Las Vegas, where the Angels occupy a farm just outside of town belonging to the aunt of one the club members. Chuck and Wes make a bet with the Angels that they can go directly to Caesars Palace, in spite of their shabby biker appearances, to both gamble and rent a hotel room. Betsy asks the brothers to take her into town with them, but they leave her behind, after which she decides to hitchhike into town to join up with them. Once inside Las Vegas, the brothers stop at a bus terminal mail stop and pick up a set of dress suits they had shipped to themselves in advance of the planned robbery.

Chuck and Wes check into a reserved room at Caesars Palace wearing their biker garb. They then make a phone call to the farm where the Angels are camping, feigning harassment in the hotel for being bikers, asking for the club to come into town to back them up. With the bikers en route to the hotel, they quickly change into their suits and a more "square" appearance. They enter the casino and use the pretense of one of them having a stolen credit card and being detained by casino security as a means by which to gain access to the cash cage, whilst outside the Hells Angels arrive, squaring off against casino security and the police, demanding entrance to the casino while Chuck and Wes return to their room (and are witnessed doing so by the just-arrived Betsy), change back into their biker garb, and leave the hotel with $600,000 in stolen cash, unbeknownst to both the Angels and law enforcement, who are looking for two suspects in suits instead of two bikers.

Once camping back outside of Las Vegas, the Angels expel Chuck, Wes, and Betsy from the group for wasting their time over coming into Las Vegas over far less apparent trouble than they purported to be having. The trio exchange their choppers for smaller scrambler motorcycles and plan to cross the open desert to make their way back toward Los Angeles. Shortly afterward, the local sheriff pays a visit to the Hells Angels and relays his suspicions that the robbery may have been carried out by Chuck and Wes, who in turn were playing the Angels this whole time. The Angels plan to track down Chuck and Wes, locating the motorcycle shop where they also obtain scramblers and pursue the brothers and Betsy out into the desert.

It becomes revealed that Chuck and Wes are in fact half-brothers, and that neither of them needed the money from the robbery because they live off of a sizable inheritance which is solely in Chuck's name. The robbery was carried out simply for the thrill of it with the intention of returning the entire stolen sum once the brothers have returned to their home in Los Angeles. Wes, however, becomes resentful at the idea of continually depending on Chuck for his livelihood and decides to keep half of the money stolen from Caesars Palace. They fight, with Wes and Betsy splitting off from Chuck. The Angels arrive and see that the trio has split up. They ride after Chuck on a prolonged motorcycle chase. Chuck is nearly trapped, and attempts to jump his bike across a gorge to get away from being surrounded by the Angels. Chuck jumps short, his bike explodes on the other side of the gorge and he is killed.

Wes and Betsy arrive just in time to see Chuck die, after which they are surrounded by the Angels, who take the stolen money, disable Wes and Betsy's motorcycles, and dump out their water supply. The Angels ride off as Wes and Betsy abandon their now useless motorcycles and are left to an uncertain fate as the movie ends.

The movie is noteworthy for having many prominent members of the Hells Angels (most notably Sonny Barger) play themselves.

== Cast ==
- Tom Stern as Chuck
- Jeremy Slate as Wes
- Conny Van Dyke as Betsy
- Steve Sandor as Apache
- Sonny Barger as Sonny
- Clifford Workman as Skip
- Tiny Walters as Tiny
- Charles Tinsley as Charlie Magoo
- John Terence Tracy as Terry The Tramp aka Tramp
- The Oakland Hells Angels as Themselves
- G.D. Spradlin as Detective

== Release ==
Hell's Angels '69 premiered at the DeMille Theatre in New York City on September 10, 1969. It was released in theatres in Sweden on July 15, 1970. The film was released on DVD on July 27, 2004 and again on January 31, 2006.

== Reception ==
=== Critical response ===
Roger Greenspun of The New York Times wrote in his review: "HELL'S ANGELS '69, which opened about 30 per cent out of focus at the DeMille yesterday, uses that noted law-and-order group, the Oakland Hells Angels, as heroes in a dismal story that wastes most of its attention on the villains. By now their physical resemblance to lovable teddy bears may well have affected the Angels' self image, but not, I hope, to the extent that they continue to submit to such degrading elevation in American folk-demonology. Two California playboy types (Tom Stern and Jeremy Slate, who also wrote the film in which they star) join the Angels and con them into riding to Las Vegas, where they use them as public diversion to cover a robbery from Caesars Palace.

"They make their haul, and their getaway, but not without the encumbrance of a buxom Angel mamma (Conny Van Dyke) and the threat of the Angels' revenge. Revenge comes after a desert motorcycle chase, photographed with such concern for getting pursuers and pursued into a single frame that it looks less like a chase than a pleasure ride. Before the Angels have brutally righted the wrong, the Nevada desert has been covered with a quantity of lost loot perhaps unequaled since the windblown paper money finale of Allan Dwan's The River's Edge (1957). But comparisons can only hurt Hell's Angels '69, which more than lacks in character and conviction what it attempts to make up in sucker's-eye views of Vegas casinos and timid glances at bike-groups' mores. With this caper, as with so many in recent movies, the theft is for a lark rather than for the money — a squandering of time and energy (more time than energy) that seems both unesthetic and immoral. Only Miss Van Dyke emerges, her acting ability still in question (a plus in the context of Hell's Angels '69), but her physical presence superb. Plump, pretty, with a kind of facial nobility that depends more on soul than on bone structure, she catches the image of the American lost girl with an indirection that deserves a better movie than this."

== Box office ==
After eight months of release, the film became profitable.
