= Artifacts at the End of a Decade (portfolio) =

Artifacts at the End of a Decade (1981) is a boxed multiple portfolio containing works from 44 artists who were active in New York City in the 1970s. Assembled by Steven Watson and Carol Huebner Venezia, Artifacts is a collection of pieces designed uniquely for this project. The portfolio is 15 in × 18 in × 6 in (380 mm × 460 mm × 150 mm) and weighs 17 pounds (7.7 kg). Its "pages" are made from everything from glass, copper, clay, rope, felt, and film to lycra, neoprene, polyester, mylar, vinyl, stucco, and glitter. Artifacts was described by Jessica Scott of UMass Amherst as a "multidisciplinary American survey of the 1970's in the form of an artists' archive." Artifacts is a limited edition of 100.

Most recently, Artifacts was exhibited at the Museum of Contemporary Art at the University of Massachusetts Amherst in 2021, and at the Centre Pompidou in 2022 accompanied by a talk by Watson.

== Conception and production ==
In 1979, Watson and Huebner Venezia sent 200 letters to active visual artists, writers, and musicians, inviting them to take part in a collaborative project. Those who responded created a page for the "book" that became Artifacts. The portfolio was assembled without any outside funding or intervention and was finished in 1981. In an interview for Widewalls Magazine, Watson expressed that he was "amazed" that he, Huebner Venezia, and the participating artists "could produce such a huge collaborative project organized without grants or gallery sponsorship or professionals in the art world." He continued that the project depended strictly on "engagement from artists who were drawn to the idea, rather than any commercial benefits."

== Artists ==
The artists who contributed to Artifacts, in alphabetical order by last name, are:

- Harry Anderson, Laurie Anderson, John Ashbery, Charles Arnold Jr., Bern Boyle, Stephanie Blumenthal, Lucinda Childs, Jane Comfort, R. Crumb, Dan Dailey, Jimmy De Sana, Evergon, Sandi Fellman, Benno Friedman, April Greiman, Martha A. Holt, James Hong, Betsey Johnson, Sonia Katchian, Christopher Knowles, Robert Kushner, Stephanie Brody-Lederman, Sol LeWitt, Jacqueline Livingston, Joan E. Livingstone, David Lusby, Joan Lyons, Joseph Masheck, Judith McWillie, Joan Nelson, Bea Nettles, Jayme Odgers, Richard Olson, Kingsley Parker, Harvey Lawrence Pekar, Lucio Pozzi, Donald Rodan, Martha Rosler, Soul artists, Stanley Stellar, Michelle Stuart, Benedict Tisa, Curtis Van Buren, Wenda von Weise, Philip Warner, and Robert Wilson.

== Collections ==
Institutions that have collected Artifacts:

Museums and Galleries: Museum of Modern Art (MoMA), Centre Pompidou, The Metropolitan Museum of Art, Tate Modern, Philadelphia Museum of Art, Stedelijk Museum Amsterdam, Victoria and Albert Museum, Whitney Museum of American Art, Reina Sofia, Hamburger Bahnhof, Walker Art Center, Brooklyn Museum, Albright-Knox Museum, Fogg museum, Yale University Art Gallery, Museo Serralves in Porto, Portugal, Museum of Contemporary Art Barcelona, Museum fur Gestaltung, Kunstmuseum Den Haag, Los Angeles County Museum of Art (LACMA).

Libraries, Universities, and Colleges: Stanford University, Cleveland Institute of Art, Library of Congress, Center for Curatorial Studies at Bard College, Getty Research Institute, New York Public Library, University Museum of Contemporary Art, Amherst College, New York University, Savannah College of Art & Design, University of Delaware, University of Kansas, University of Colorado at Boulder, Western Michigan University, Rhode Island School of Design.
