= North Dakota Museum of Art =

Museum in Grand Forks, North Dakota

Coordinates: 47°55′8.5″N 97°4′25.6″W

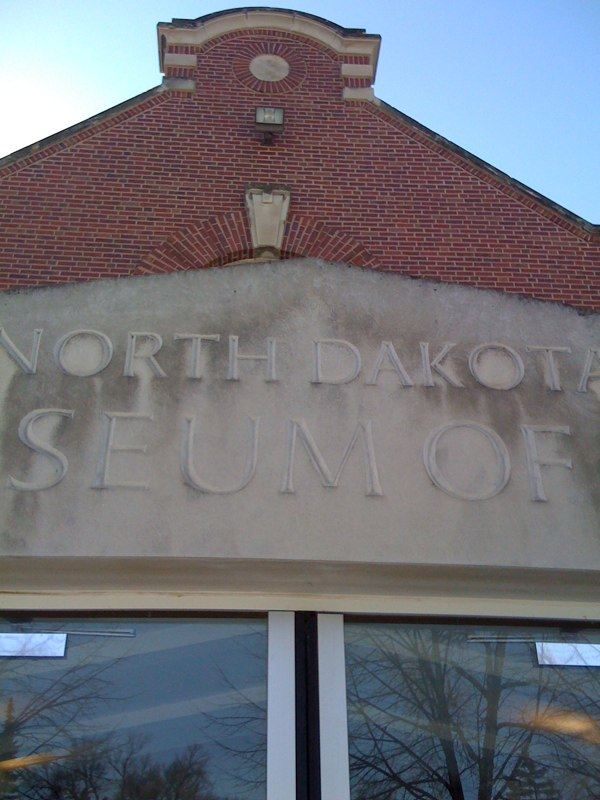
- Exterior of the museum
- Former name: University of North Dakota Art Galleries
- Location: Grand Forks, North Dakota
- Website: ndmoa.com

The North Dakota Museum of Art (NDMOA) is the official art museum of the American state of North Dakota. Located on the campus of the University of North Dakota, in Grand Forks, North Dakota, the museum is a private not-for-profit institution. The building includes three exhibition galleries, a video information room, cafe, and gift shop. Admission is free.

== History ==
The museum was formed in the 1970s as the University of North Dakota Art Galleries.

In 1981, the North Dakota Legislative Assembly designated the museum as the state's official art museum and the museum took on its present name. The 1907 West Gymnasium on the University of North Dakota campus was remodeled and, in 1989, the 16,000-square-foot (1,500 m^{2}) structure became the new home for the museum. Facilities in the museum have been designed by artists who have worked with the museum in the past, including the gift shop and donor wall, created by New York artist Barton Lidice Beneš, who constructed the donor wall similar to his own shadow box museums, and the outdoor sculpture garden created by Richard Nonas (Nonas article is in French language). The museum finished a significant renovation project that included installation of skylights, new flooring, and windows.

== Permanent collection ==
The museum's permanent collection includes works by María Magdalena Campos Pons, Aganetha Dyck, Rena Effendi, Walter Piehl, and Kiki Smith.

== Exhibits ==
The museum features changing exhibitions from regional, national, and international contemporary artists. Exhibits from the past have included:

- Bugs and Such
- Lewis and Clark: Rivers, Edens, Empires
- The Plains of Sweet Regret
- Under the Whelming Tide: The 1997 Flood of the Red River of the North

Since 2013, the museum has hosted an exhibit of the reconstruction of artist Barton Beneš's New York City apartment called Barton's Place.

Other past exhibitions include:

=== 2014 ===
- Arnold Saper: A Face to Paint
- Songs for Spirit Lake
- Mary Bonkemeyer: Decades in Paint
- Robert Rauschenberg: Four Decades of Work on Paper
- Fractured: North Dakota's Oil Boom

=== 2015 ===
- An African Affair
- Micah Bloom: Codex
- Colorprint U.S.A.
- Armando Ramos: Something Absurd
- Jill Brody: Hidden in Plain Sight
- Fred Liang: A Bubble in a Stream

=== 2016 ===
- Rick Bartow: Things I Know, But Cannot Explain
- Allison Leigh Holt: The Glass System
- In Our Own Words: Native Impressions
- Justin Sorensen: Stalking the Snow Leopard
- Kim Fink: Changing Nature
- Songs for Spirit Lake – Part II

== Musical concert series ==
Musical concert series include:

- Sunday Concerts in the Gallery Series (October to April)
- Concerts in the Garden (July and August)
- NDMOA Downtown at the Empire Arts Center

== Outreach ==
Outreach programs include Summer Kid's Art Camps, Family Days At The Museum, adult classes, rural arts program, and touring exhibits.

== See also ==
- List of art museums
- List of museums in North Dakota
