= That Boy =

1974 gay pornographic film

- Film poster
- Directed by: Peter Berlin
- Written by: Peter Berlin
- Produced by: Peter Berlin
- Starring: Peter Berlin; Arron Black
- Cinematography: Ignatio Rutkowski; Phillip Martin
- Edited by: Peter Berlin
- Production company: Hand in Hand Films
- Release date: 1974
- Running time: 79 minutes
- Country: United States
- Language: English

That Boy is a 1974 gay pornographic film written, produced and directed by Peter Berlin, in his directorial debut. It is his last feature-length porn film in which he appeared as an actor following Nights in Black Leather.

== Synopsis ==
The film opens with Helmut masturbating in a wooden area with a man standing, watching him, and then moves to Helmut walking the streets of San Francisco, wearing a leather biker cap, black leather jacket, and white bell-bottomed pants, with members from the queer collective The Cockettes following him. He then notices a blind boy standing on a street corner, and when he goes to cross the street, Helmut helps guide him across the street.

Meanwhile, a photographer is across the street taking pictures of him, which morphs into a scene where the photographer fantasizes about taking photos of him, until the studio is covered with hundreds of prints of Helmut.

The action then turns back to Helmut and the blind boy going into a cafe. When they return to the street, they pass a Black man standing outside a health club, which results in a fantasy sex scene between Helmut and the Black man inside the gym.

When the film returns once again to the street, Helmut and the blind boy enter a park where Helmut describes a duck pond to him. Upon returning to the streets, another man passes by observing Helmut and imagines a fantasy scene of sex with Helmut in the "No Name Bar", with multiple patrons from the bar joining in.

The film ends with Helmut and the blind boy walking off into the sunset with a voice–over by the blind boy saying: "He will always hold me in his memory as I am now, as I was in these fine days."

== Cast ==
- Peter Berlin as Helmut
- Arron Black as the blind boy
- Walter Wright
- Rickey Davis
- Steven James
- Phillip Martin
- Rock Action
- Justin Sullivan
- Bobby Star
- Surreal Star
- Timmy Mukluk
- Pristine Condition
- Lisa Mukluk
- K
- Chastity White
- Jesus Christ Satan
- Bill Bowers

== Background ==
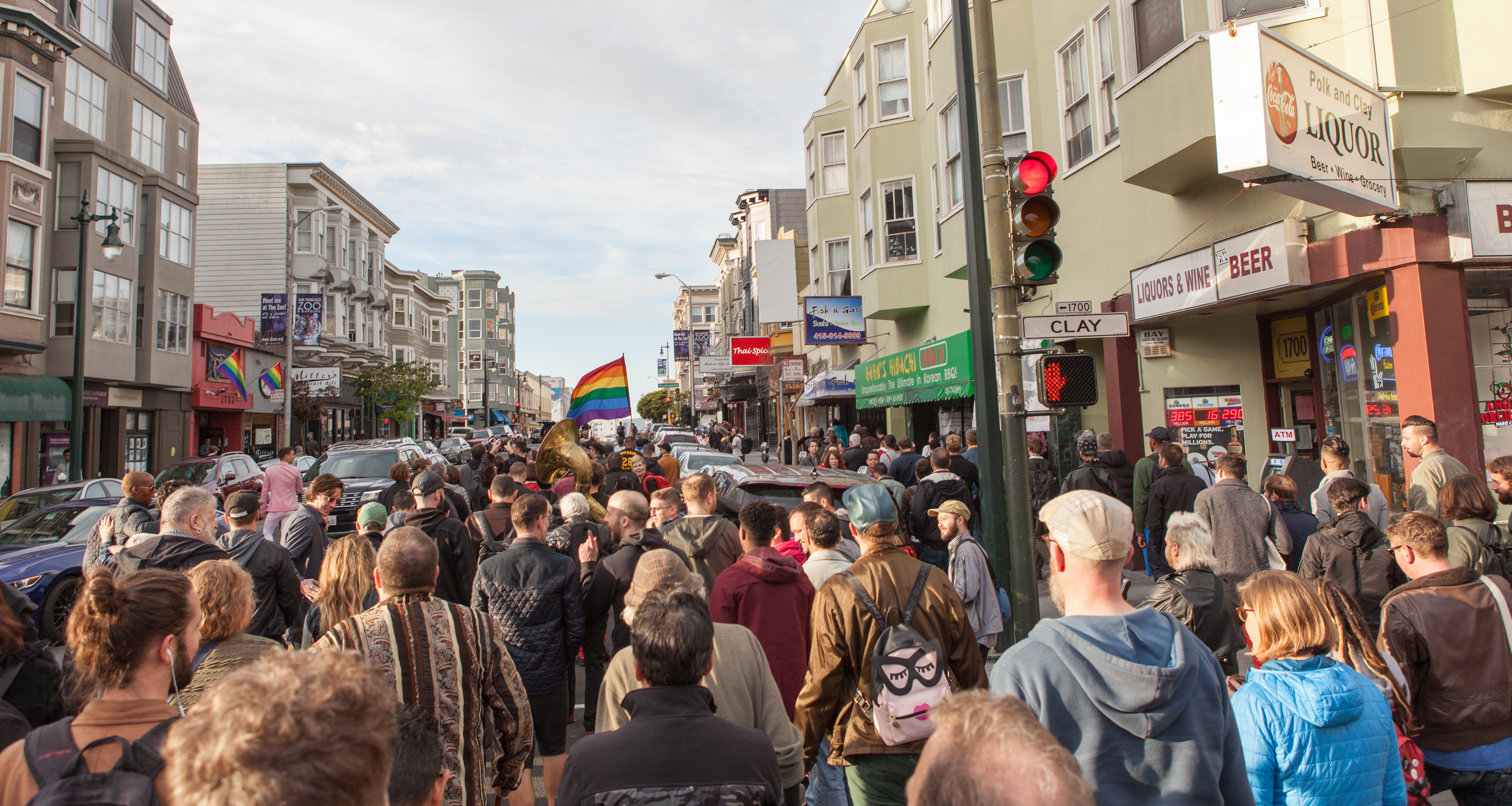
Polk Street seen in 2018, during a March to Remember and Reclaim Queer Space

Berlin directed the film himself because he was not satisfied with the direction of his first film. Berlin also served as the editor of the film, editing the action to sync with an "eclectic array of music." When he discovered his co–star for the film, Arron Black, could not act, he decided it was best to just make the character blind. That decision caused John Karr of the Bay Area Reporter to remark: "The crux of the plot became Peter’s need for refuge in the boy’s acceptance, which prompted some rather convoluted, not entirely comprehensible, and unintentionally comic musings on Peter's part. Here's a man who lives to be seen, whose biggest need is to be witnessed, paradoxically finding fulfillment in a person who can't do either." The movie was filmed on location in San Francisco, primarily on Polk Street, Folsom Street, with a scene in the "No Name Bar".

== Reception ==
Author Edward Miller observed that "Berlin keeps the vérité tone but indulges much more in fantasy; the film also disconnects the voice from body by almost entirely abandoning dialogue and using voice-over instead; there is also an overarching narrative that connects all the segments in the film."

In 2011, Irish Film Institute wrote that "soft-core by modern standards, That Boy still packs an erotic and voyeuristic punch." Robert Lang from Deadline Hollywood opined That Boy is considered a "cult classic" and a "pioneering example of gay pornographic cinema."

John Karr wrote in the Bay Area Reporter that the film "packs its most powerful punches in its fantasy scenes of Peter appreciation; it isn’t porno as we know it, but an intense exploration of eroticism, and most especially fetishism, for both cock and cock-enhancing garments." Karr highlights one scene as "brilliant", where Berlin is posing for a photographer and is "slowly stripping what seems unending layers of cock-glorifications, each more incredibly teeny and enticing than the last."

== See also ==
- List of LGBTQ-related films of 1974
- List of pornographic movie studios
- List of male performers in gay porn films
