= W.W. and the Dixie Dancekings =

1975 film by John G. Avildsen

- Theatrical release poster
- Directed by: John G. Avildsen
- Written by: Thomas Rickman
- Produced by: Stanley C. Canter; Steve Shagan
- Starring: Burt Reynolds; Conny Van Dyke; Jerry Reed; Ned Beatty; Art Carney
- Cinematography: James Crabe
- Edited by: Richard Halsey; Robbe Roberts
- Music by: Dave Grusin
- Production company: Triangle Productions
- Distributed by: 20th Century Fox
- Release date: May 21, 1975 (U.S.)
- Running time: 91 minutes
- Country: United States
- Language: English
- Budget: $2,805,000
- Box office: $17 million

W.W. and the Dixie Dancekings is a 1975 American crime comedy film directed by John G. Avildsen, starring Burt Reynolds, and written by Thomas Rickman. The 20th Century Fox film features the acting debut of Jerry Reed.

== Plot ==
In 1957, W.W. Bright is an easygoing crook who robs only Southland Oil System (SOS) gas stations. He meets the Dixie Dancekings, a country music band, while fleeing from a policeman. Dixie, their singer, gives him an alibi. He claims to be in the music business, and ends up promoting the group. Wayne, the band's leader, does not trust him, but the others all have faith in him.

The SOS chairman sends for Bible-thumping ex-lawman Deacon John Wesley Gore to catch W.W. Meanwhile, W.W. and the newly outfitted band go to see Country Bull Jenkins, a highly successful singer-songwriter. He is willing to write them a song for $1,000.

W.W. talks the Dancekings into a bank robbery (SOS has just expanded into the banking business) that does not work out quite as planned. When Gore broadcasts the description of the getaway car on a radio revival show, W.W. burns up his rare, distinctive car.

W.W. is ready to separate from the Dancekings to shield them, but then he hears them rehearsing Wayne's new song. He persuades Country Bull to listen to it; the man is so impressed, he puts them on the Grand Ole Opry radio show. There, Gore catches W.W., using an exact replica of his burnt car as bait. Gore makes him drive to the police station, but just as they arrive, Gore realizes it is now Sunday, so rather than violate the Sabbath, he lets W.W. go (with the car). W.W. salutes Gore as the finest Lawman he has ever known.

== Cast ==
- Burt Reynolds as W.W. Bright
- Conny Van Dyke as Dixie
- Jerry Reed as Wayne
- Ned Beatty as Country Bull Jenkins
- James Hampton as Junior
- Don Williams as Leroy
- Rick Hurst as Butterball
- Mel Tillis as GOB
- Furry Lewis as Uncle Furry
- Art Carney as Deacon John Wesley Gore

== Production ==
=== Development ===
Burt Reynolds was originally going to make the film with Dick Richards in late 1972. However, he dropped it to do The Man Who Loved Cat Dancing.

In January 1974, Reynolds signed to do the movie, and filming started in February 1974 in Nashville. Reynolds approved John Avildsen on the basis of a recommendation from Jack Lemmon, who had worked with the director on Save the Tiger.

John Avildsen says Sylvester Stallone auditioned for a supporting role. He did not get the job, but starred in Rocky, the director's next film.

Reynolds wanted Lynn Anderson to play the female lead Dixie, but she declined. The role was then offered to Dolly Parton, who also declined; however, the two would later work together on The Best Little Whorehouse in Texas.

Filming was marked by tension between Reynolds and Avildsen. The two men did not get along professionally or personally, and there were often clashes in approach and temperament.

=== "Golden Anniversary" Oldsmobile ===
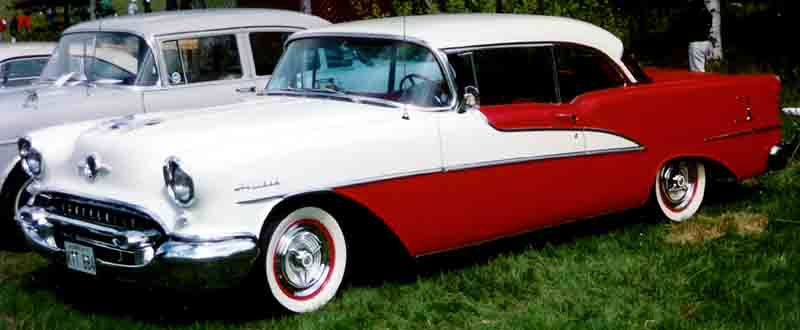
Example of a 1955 two-door Oldsmobile Holiday 88

One of the central props in the movie is the car that W.W. Bright (Reynolds) drives. In the film, it is described as a special 1955 "Golden Anniversary" Oldsmobile Rocket 88, of which only 50 were purportedly made. It is a four-door sedan painted gold with black hood and side accents and chrome trim. In reality, there was no such special model, and in any event, 1955 was not the 50th anniversary of Oldsmobile.

Three such cars were custom-built for the film from stock 1955 Oldsmobiles. One was destroyed in the fire scene, one was taken to a museum, and the third was used as the camera car, with the roof removed. Radio Shack in California had a promotional giveaway for the third car shortly after the movie was released. The Radio Shack connection is that Burt Reynolds and the Smokey and the Bandit movies created a demand for CB radios, which amounted to 30% of Radio Shack's sales during the height of the craze.

== Reception ==
=== Critical reception ===
Vincent Canby of The New York Times enjoyed the film:

[Y]ou may find John G. Avildsen's W.W. and the Dixie Dancekings an unexpectedly pleasant surprise ... One of the charms of the movie is the casual way it seems to discover its story while it wanders from one minor crisis to the next ... The film's supporting roles are very well cast.

Roger Ebert of the Chicago Sun-Times gave the film two stars out of four.

[D]irector John G. Avildsen seems to be going for some kind of mythic meaning larger than the movie can hold. If only the movie had stayed closer to street level, had engaged itself with the lives of W.W. and the band, it might have been more successful.

=== Box office ===
The film earned North American rentals of $8 million. It was one of the studio's biggest films of the year.

When the film aired on U.S. TV in January 1977, it was the second-highest rated show of the week.

=== Burt Reynolds ===
Reynolds said the film "turned out wrong but it made a lot of money. It was supposed to be a special, warm and lovely little film. It was important that we not make fun of the people in Nashville as opposed to [the movie] Nashville. It wasn't that kind of movie. It was a bouquet to Nashville. But I got into a lot of fights with the director."

Nonetheless, Reynolds liked Jerry Reed's performance so much he later cast Reed in his first film as director, Gator (1976).

== Legacy ==
Quentin Tarantino credited the novelization of the film by screenwriter Thomas Rickman as getting him interested in writing. He bought the novelization and would read it every few years. Tarantino said in 2003:

I found out later that Thomas Rickman was so disgusted with what they did with his movie that he asked to write the novelization, so that one person out there would know what it was that he intended. I'm 40 now, and I still read W.W. and the Dixie Dancekings every three years. I'm that one person. When I saw the movie, though, a few years after I'd first read the book, I was like, What the hell is this? I mean, I was offended. I was literally offended. The novelization was pure. But this was Hollywood garbage. So that's why I started writing screenplays, because I was so outraged.

== See also ==
- List of American films of 1975
