= Daniel Cartier =

American songwriter, singer and actor (born 1969)

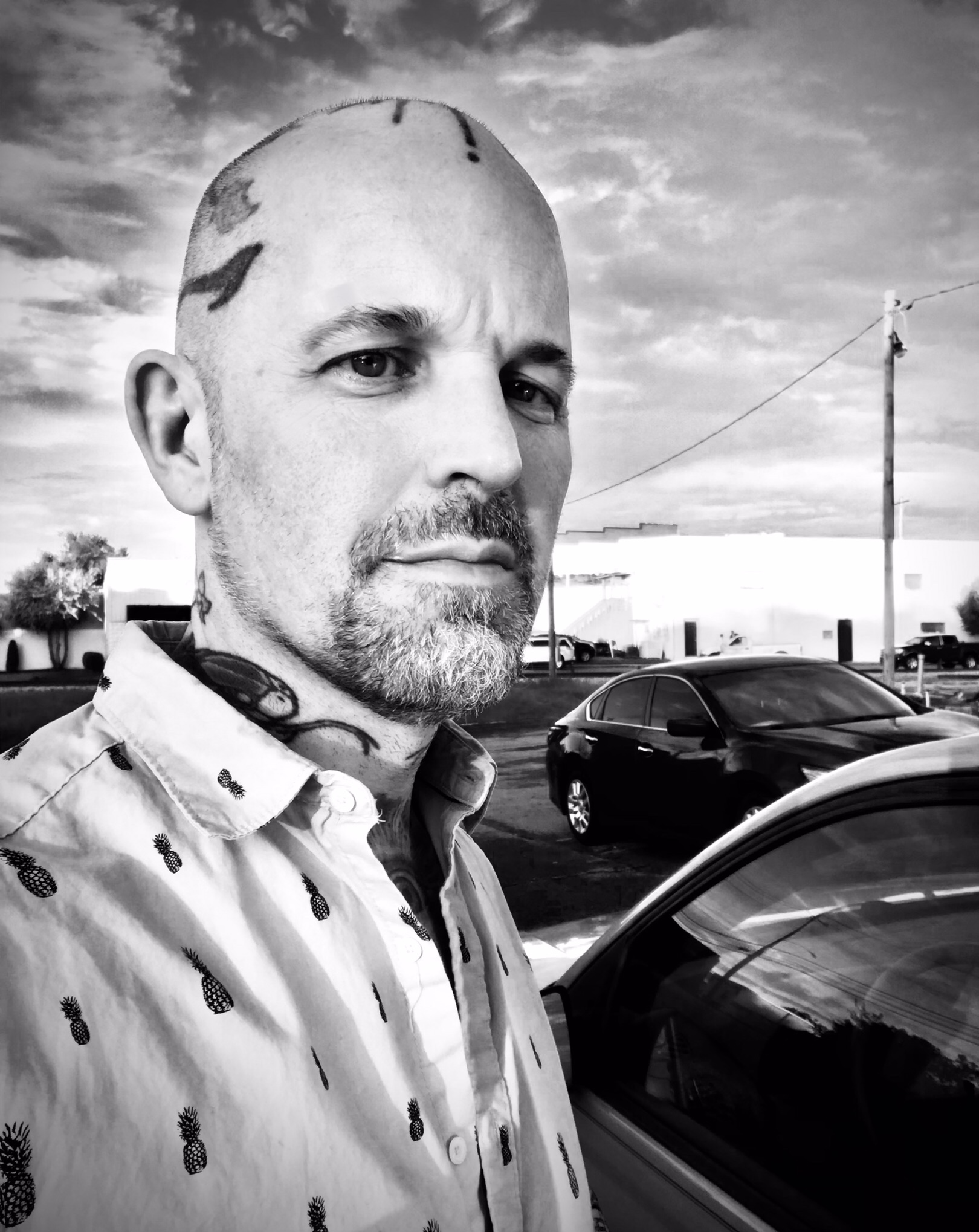
- Cartier in 2021

Background information
- Also known as: Daniel Cartier Loves You
- Born: June 25, 1969 (age 57); Exeter, New Hampshire
- Origin: New York City
- Genres: Folk-pop
- Occupation: Singer-songwriter
- Instruments: Guitar, keyboards
- Years active: 1990s-present

Daniel Cartier (born June 25, 1969) is an American songwriter, singer, and actor. He resides in rural Tennessee.

== Background ==
Cartier grew up in Exeter, New Hampshire, where he played in goth and punk bands as a teenager. In 1991, he moved to New York City, where he began as a performer in subway stations before playing in nightclubs.

== Career ==
Cartier began his career in New York City, singing on subway platforms and street corners. Discovered by Elton John, Cartier was signed to John's label, Rocket Records. He recorded his first disc, Live From New York: The Subway Sessions on a New York City subway platform, donating the proceeds to various homeless organizations. He noted, "many people who fall through the cracks of our society have no other place to rest their heads except the subway. Seeing as I was recording an album in their home - I felt it was important to give something back."

Cartier then teamed with producer Fred Maher to create his major label studio debut for Rocket Records. The resulting album, Avenue A, was a critical hit, receiving 5-star reviews in various publications and landing on many "best of" lists at the year's end.

Cartier toured throughout America and Europe and made several appearances on national television (MTV, VH1, NY1 News, FX, CNN) and radio in cities throughout the U.S. He also appeared in numerous magazines, including Entertainment Weekly, Billboard, Interview, HITS, PAPER, Vogue, Spin, New York Times, and The Boston Globe.

After being dropped by Rocket Records in 1998 following a corporate takeover, Cartier briefly moved to Los Angeles. There, the Daniel Cartier Band sold out several shows at the Viper Room on the Sunset Strip, supporting John Doe of the seminal LA punk band X during a series of monthly residencies.

In 2005, he suffered a nervous breakdown, and left the music business for a time before reemerging in 2004 with the independent albums Revival and Wide Outside. The albums were recorded at his new home recording studio in the Cape Cod area of Massachusetts.

In 2005, he appeared as title character in the experimental and controversial film Flirting with Anthony, directed by Christian Calson.

Cartier's 2010 album, Redemption, produced by Tony Award-winning producer Joe McGinnis (Spring Awakening, Best Musical) and Derek Garten (Parachute Musical, Jewel, Band Of Horses) focused on his vocals. Symphonic elements – strings, horns, and woodwinds – were paired with guitars, drums, and electronic machinery. The album featured contributions by members of Lynyrd Skynyrd, P-funk All Stars, The Wallflowers, Sheryl Crow's backup band, and the Nashville Symphony.

In September 2015, he released his back catalog digitally - alongside a new 15-song album Exeter, named after his hometown. The album was recorded in his childhood home after his parents died.

In 2021, Cartier's music appeared in the critically acclaimed film Swan Song, starring Udo Kier, Linda Evans, and Jennifer Coolidge. Along with his vocals, which were mixed into the film's score, his song "Hovering" played over the closing credits.

He returned to music on a full-time basis in 2023, with the release of his album Mix Tape Summer, a collection of songs inspired by summer jams and dance floors.

As an openly gay artist, Daniel has spoken out on subjects of equality and justice. At the 25th anniversary of the Stonewall Rebellion that marked a turning point in the LGBT movement, Daniel received a standing ovation from an estimated 500,000 people after performing his song, "Pushing Back Life."

To continue creating music without relying on record label funding, Cartier educated himself on the art of sound engineering and music production, recording CDs for himself and others in the process. His music catalog includes over 800 songs, spanning several genres and styles. Recent releases, including Naked Christmas and Mix Tape Summer, were recorded in his home studio.

He has been compared to artists including Al Green, Cat Stevens, Donovan, Sonic Youth, the late Jeff Buckley, and "a kinder, gentler Prince."

== Personal life ==
Cartier resides in rural Tennessee, in a renovated farmhouse from 1899, with his partner and four handicapped dogs.

He has hosted fundraisers for animal shelters, and donates his spare time and talent to both human- and animal-related charities. He has also created many large-scale works of visual art, which have been shown in galleries throughout America. He recently released a clothing line inspired by his collages.

Cartier struggled with alcoholism for the majority of his adult life. He has been sober since January 2019, and is an active member of the central Tennessee recovery community.

== Discography ==
- The Troubadour of Avenue A (1993)
- Live from New York: The Subway Session (1996)
- Avenue A (1997)
- Glorified Demos (1999)
- Revival (2004)
- Wide Outside (2001)
- You and Me are We (2006)
- This Christmas (2009)
- Redemption (2010)
- Exeter (2015)
- Naked Christmas (With Jason Slayton) (2022)
- Mix Tape Summer (2023)
