= Alvin Baltrop =

American photographer (1948–2004)

- Born: December 11, 1948; The Bronx, New York City
- Died: February 1, 2004 (aged 55); New York City, New York, U.S.
- Education: School of Visual Arts
- Known for: Photography

Alvin Baltrop (December 11, 1948 – February 1, 2004) was an American photographer. Baltrop's work focused on the dilapidated Hudson River piers and gay men during the 1970s and 1980s prior to the AIDS crisis.

== Early life ==
Baltrop was born in 1948 at the old Lincoln Hospital in the Bronx. He discovered his love of photography in junior high school, learning different techniques from older photographers in his neighborhood and teaching himself to develop photos.

== Career ==
Baltrop enlisted in the Navy in 1969 as a medic during the Vietnam War and continued taking photos, mainly of his friends in sexually provocative poses. He built his own developing lab in the sick bay, using medic trays for developing trays. After his time in the Navy, Baltrop worked odd jobs as a street vendor, a jewelry designer, a printer, and a cab driver. In 1973, Baltrop enrolled in the School of Visual Arts, where he studied until 1975. Because he wanted to spend more time taking photos at the Hudson River piers, he quit his job as a cab driver to become a self-employed mover. He would park his van at the piers for days at a time, living out of his van to take pictures.

From 1975 through 1986, Baltrop took photographs of the West Side piers, where he was a well-known member of the community. He knew every person that he photographed, and people often volunteered to be his subjects. Younger boys and men at the piers often confided in him about their sexual orientation, their relationships with their families, their housing status, and their work. The piers saw cruising, anonymous sex, and occasional art interventions. His photographs not only captured human personalities, but also the aesthetics of the dilapidated piers.

Baltrop captured the gay cruising spots and hookup culture that existed in New York City before the AIDS epidemic. His life work is a snapshot of gay, African-American, and New York City history.

Baltrop struggled to make his way in the art world, facing racism from the white gay art world. Gay curators often rejected his work, accused him of stealing it, or stole his work themselves.

Late in the 1990s, New York City artist John Drury, who knew Baltrop from their shared neighborhood—Drury living on Third Street with his wife, and Baltrop on Second Street, in lower Manhattan—befriended the artist and recognized the photographer's unique abilities, nominating him for a Louis Comfort Tiffany Foundation Award for the Arts. Baltrop had few exhibits in his lifetime; his work gained international fame only after his death.

=== Posthumous attention ===
Baltrop was interviewed for Joseph Lovett's Gay Sex in the 70s (2006), appearing posthumously alongside other gay artists like Tom Bianchi, Barton Benes, and Larry Kramer.

In 2008, University of Rochester art professor Douglas Crimp wrote an article about Baltrop for Artforum magazine that regenerated interest in Baltrop's work.

In 2012, the artist's solo exhibition titled Perspectives 179— Alvin Baltrop: Dreams into Glass in the Contemporary Art Museum Houston included almost 100 gelatin silver prints that were shot between 1969 and 1980. The most captivating and intimate images in the show were shot while Baltrop was in the Navy. These are dated between 1969 and 1972 and had an unmistakably erotic atmosphere. In his photograph called Three Navy Sailors, a trio of young black men in uniform tease the camera. The man to the far right slyly smiles and sticks his tongue out while the man next to him throws a side glance. The third man to the far left is seen suppressing a laugh. Many of Baltrop's pictures from the pier use distance to enhance his voyeuristic approach. In Don't let them see you, published in his book called The Piers, Baltrop had positioned his camera inside a darkened area looking out at the shadowy foreground and a male figure looking down at another, who is crouched beneath him and performing a sexual act. Neither one of them acknowledges the presence of the nearby photographer and, by extension, the viewer. In another image, Man looking in a window, we see a man wearing a shirt and nothing from the waist down, except his boots, peering into a building through broken windowpanes. This act of voyeurism parallels the photographer's intention when taking this image.

In 2015, the Spanish publisher TF Editores published Alvin Baltrop: The Piers, edited by James Reid, Tom Watt, and Glenn O'Brien.

Fiona Anderson's Cruising the Dead River: David Wojnarowicz and New York's Ruined Waterfront (2019) includes extensive analysis of Baltrop's photography in and among the piers.

The Bronx Museum held a retrospective of his work in 2019 The Life and Times of Alvin Baltrop. Items from his personal archive (owned by the Bronx Museum) were shown to the public for the first time in this exhibit.

== Personal life ==
According to one journalist, Baltrop came out as gay at fourteen years old. Baltrop had long-term relationships with men and women, but preferred the umbrella term "gay" to "bisexual."

Baltrop was diagnosed with cancer in the 1990s. Impoverished and without health insurance, curators and filmmakers attempted to exploit him for their own financial gain. He died on February 1, 2004, at the age of 55.

== Exhibitions ==
- Alvin Baltrop, Glines (1977)
- Sexy and the City, Yossi Milo Gallery, Chelsea, New York City, New York (2009)
- Dead Flowers, Vox Populi Gallery, Philadelphia, Pennsylvania (2010)
- Looking Back: The Fifth White Columns Annual, White Columns, Greenwich Village, New York City, New York (2010)
- Mixed Use, Manhattan: Photography and Related Practices 1970s to the Present, Museo Nacional Centro de Arte Reina Sofía, Madrid, Spain (2010)
- Queer Pier 40 Years: (re)Envisioning LGBTIQ Stories, FIERCE, New York City (2010)
- "Ashes from a Flame" displayed in the Homomuseum: Heroes and Monuments exhibit (2005)
- Alvin Baltrop: Selected Works, The Watermill Center, Watermill, New York (2011)
- Looking Back - The 6th White Columns Annual, White Columns, Greenwich Village, New York City, New York (2011)
- Every Exit is an Entrance: 30 Years of Exit Art, Exit Art, Hell's Kitchen, New York City, New York (2012)
- Lost and Found: Anonymous Photography in Reflection, Ambach & Rice, Los Angeles, California (2012)
- Perspectives 179: Alvin Baltrop: Dreams into Glass, Zilkha Gallery, Contemporary Arts Museum Houston, Houston, Texas (2012)
- Alvin Baltrop & Gordon Matta-Clark: The Piers from Here, Open Eye Gallery, Liverpool, England (2014)
- America is Hard to See, Whitney Museum of American Art, USA, New York (2015)
- Douglas Crimp: Before Pictures, Buchholz, New York City, New York (2015)
- Greater New York, MoMA PS1, Long Island City, New York (2015)
- Wild Noise: Artwork from the Bronx Museum of the Arts and El Museo Nacional de Bellas Artes, Bronx Museum of the Arts, Bronx, New York City, New York (2015)
- Human Interest: Portraits from the Whitney's Collection, Whitney Museum of American Art, New York City, New York (2016)
- Alvin Baltrop: At the Hudson River Piers, selected by Douglas Crimp, Galerie Buchholz New York (2017)
- The Life and Times of Alvin Baltrop, Bronx Museum of the Arts, Bronx, New York (2019)

== Collections ==
Baltrop's work is held in the following permanent collections:

- Museum of Modern Art, New York
- Whitney Museum of American Art, New York: 4 prints (as of June 2021)

== See also ==
- Leonard Fink
