= Steven Watson (author) =

American writer and film director

Steven Watson (born 1947) is an author, art and cultural historian, curator, and documentary filmmaker.

His 1991 book Strange Bedfellows: The First American Avant-Garde was called "a chapter in our national biography" by Stefan Kanfer for the Los Angeles Times and "a marvelous group portrait of a band of cultural renegades" by Publishers Weekly. Watson has written five books about 20th century American avant-garde and counterculture movements, curated two exhibitions at the National Portrait Gallery ("Group Portrait, The First American Avant-Garde" and "Rebels: Painters and Poets of the 1950s"), and served as consultant curator for the Whitney Museum exhibition "Beat Culture and the New America".

== Biography ==
Watson was born in 1947. He grew up in the suburbs of Minneapolis, Minnesota and graduated from Mound High School. He majored in English at Stanford University and participated in anti-Vietnam War protests, including a guerrilla theater piece called Alice in ROTC-Land, co-starring with Sigourney Weaver. After graduation, he founded an alternative elementary school called KNOW School in Auburn, California. He studied psychology at the University of California, Santa Barbara, where he received his Ph.D. in 1976, and he worked for nineteen years as the staff psychologist of the Putnam County Community Mental Health Clinic. In 1976, Watson also began writing articles for the Village Voice, New York Newsday, Soho Weekly News, and Gaysweek. His work on gay culture included the first major article about Marsha P. Johnson, an early extended interview with Sylvia Rivera, and a book about the transgender figure, Minette. At the same time, he began writing books about key circles of the twentieth century. He currently lives in New York City.

== Published works ==
Books:

- Minette: Recollections of a Part-time Lady (with Ray Dobbins), Flower Beneath the Foot Press (1979)
- Stonewall Romances (with Ray Dobbins), Flower Beneath the Foot Press, (1979)
- Strange Bedfellows: The First American Avant-Garde, Abbeville Press (1991)
- The Harlem Renaissance: Hub of African American Culture 1920-1930, Pantheon (1995)
- The Birth of the Beat Generation: Visionaries Rebels and Hipsters 1944-1960, Pantheon (1995)
- Prepare for Saints: Gertrude Stein, Virgil Thomson, and the Mainstreaming of American Modernism, Random House (2000)
- An Eye of the Twentieth Century: Selected Letters of Henry McBride (edited with Catherine Morris), Yale University Press (2001)
- Factory Made: Warhol and the Sixties, Pantheon (2003)

Films:

- Prepare for Saints: The Making of a Modern Opera, documentary, for Connecticut Public Television (writer, director)
- Beatrice Wood Remembers, short documentary, (2019) (writer, director)

== Collaborations ==
=== Artifacts at the End of a Decade ===
Artifacts at the End of a Decade, organized by Steven Watson and Carol Huebner Venezia, is a boxed multiple that contains the work of 44 artists. Conceived in 1979 and published in 1981, it includes works by Sol Lewitt, Laurie Anderson, Robert Wilson, R. Crumb, Lucinda Childs, Futura 2000 and other graffiti artists, John Ashbery, Betsey Johnson, Robert Kushner, Martha Rosler, and others. Upon its publication, art critic John Perreault wrote that "the work is an anthology of sorts, but it is also an object in its own right. It can be compared to artists books, print portfolios, multimedia multiples, etc. In truth, however, there is little to compare Artifacts within the realm of art."

Artifacts is currently in the collections of the Museum of Modern Art, the Metropolitan Museum of Art, the Centre Pompidou, the Tate Modern, the Victoria and Albert Museum, the Hamburger Bahnhof, and the Whitney Museum of American Art, among others.

Artifacts was exhibited at the Centre Pompidou in the summer of 2022, following its acquisition by the Bibliothèque Kandinsky.

== Organizations ==
=== Artifacts Movie Archive ===
In 2023, Watson founded Artifacts Movie Archive as a non-profit to preserve and disseminate voices of avant-garde, arts, and queer cultural figures. The platform launched on November 25, 2024, marked by a celebration event at Anthology Film Archives in Manhattan. Colleagues at the outset included co-founder, creative director William Markarian-Martin, founding editors Pablo Eguia and Auel Kanaybakov, and website designer Johan Giraud.

The archive was originally organized into three thematic series: "Andy Warhol’s Silver Factory" (including interviews with John Cale, Viva, Taylor Mead, Joe Dallesandro, and Mary Woronov), "Gender Benders" (including Marsha P. Johnson, Quentin Crisp, Holly Woodlawn, and Sylvia Rivera) and "Underground Press" (including Lawrence Ferlinghetti, Barney Rosset, Paul Krassner, and Hettie Jones). In 2025, in conjunction with the Skirball Center for the Performing Arts at NYU, a "Downtown Performance" series also launched, which included Robert Wilson, Joanne Akalaitis, Richard Foreman, and Richard Schechner.

In 2026, Watson was interviewed about Artifacts for Ursula magazine (a Hauser & Wirth production), saying, “I’m hoping to capture the most interesting voices I’ve come across during my time on Earth—that’s the simple thesis."

Artifacts is an ongoing project.

=== ChildsPlay International ===
ChildsPlay International was founded by Watson in collaboration with filmmaker Sarwar Mushtaq. The inaugural event took place in May 2011 at Jalozai Camp, near Peshawar, Pakistan, then home to more than 100,000 people displaced by regional conflict. Known as the “Olympics of the Mind and Body,” ChildsPlay expanded its model internationally, with each initiative adapted to the needs of local culture. Programs at times included elements such as tribal traditions in Ghana, mask-making in Haiti, and Quechua oral storytelling in Peru.

ChildsPlay International extended its reach to Zambia, Turkey, the Democratic Republic of the Congo, Ukraine, Uganda, and other countries. An intergenerational storytelling manual was developed, instructing teachers and community leaders how to conduct small group sessions. Select stories from these activities were published in 2025 under the title Lions, Dolphins, Tricksters, and Lazybones. In 2025, ChildsPlay International was absorbed by the nonprofit Arts Ignite.
