= Framed (1975 film) =

1975 film directed by Phil Karlson

- Directed by: Phil Karlson
- Screenplay by: Mort Briskin; John Michael Hayes (uncredited)
- Based on: Framed (1974 novel) by Art Powers; Mike Misenheimer
- Produced by: Joel Briskin; Mort Briskin
- Starring: Joe Don Baker; Conny Van Dyke; Gabriel Dell; John Marley; Brock Peters; Warren J. Kemmerling
- Cinematography: Jack A. Marta
- Edited by: Harry W. Gerstad
- Music by: Patrick Williams
- Production company: Mort Briskin Productions
- Distributed by: Paramount Pictures
- Release date: September 3, 1975 (Los Angeles)
- Running time: 106 minutes
- Country: United States
- Language: English

Framed is a 1975 American vigilante action-thriller film directed by Phil Karlson and starring Joe Don Baker, Conny Van Dyke, Gabriel Dell, John Marley and Brock Peters. It is based on a 1974 novel by Art Powers and Mike Misenheimer.

In the film, Baker plays a man who is framed and imprisoned by corrupt law enforcement after witnessing a crime. He subsequently breaks out of prison to uncover the truth and exact revenge.

Framed reunited the director, producer, and star of the 1973 hit Walking Tall, and was likewise filmed entirely in Tennessee. It was Karlson's final directorial effort before his death in 1985. It was released by Paramount Pictures on September 3, 1975.

== Plot ==
Returning home to Tennessee from a trip to Texas, nightclub owner and gambler Ron Lewis happens across a shooting and is nearly shot himself. A deputy confronts Lewis as he arrives at his home. He accuses Lewis of being involved in the shooting and roughs him up, resulting in a fight that ends up in the deputy being killed and Lewis being badly beaten. Lewis is placed under arrest for the death of the deputy.

Corrupt cops, including a thieving sheriff, and lawyers (including his own) ignore Lewis' claim of self-defense and railroad him into a prison sentence of up to 10 years. His girlfriend Susan is sexually assaulted and warned not to aid Lewis' defense in any way.

Behind bars, Lewis is befriended by mob boss Sal Viccarone and hit man Vince Greeson. He is paroled after four years and immediately sets out to get even with those who wronged him. Vince, also out of prison, is contracted to kill Lewis, but decides to help him instead, as does a law-abiding deputy, Sam Perry.

Lewis proceeds to torment and even torture the guilty parties in a number of ways, gaining his revenge and finding out the truth about what really happened the night of the roadside shooting.

== Cast ==
- Joe Don Baker as Ron Lewis
- Conny Van Dyke as Susan Barrett
- Gabriel Dell as Vince Greeson
- John Marley as Sal Viccarrone
- Brock Peters as Sam Perry
- John Larch as Bundy
- Warren J. Kemmerling as Morello
- Paul Mantee as Frank
- Walter Brooke as Senator Tatum
- Joshua Bryant as Andrew Ney
- Hunter von Leer as Dewey
- Les Lannom as Gary
- H. B. Haggerty as Bickford
- Hoke Howell as Decker
- Lawrence Montaigne as Deputy Allison
- Red West as Mallory
- Brenton Banks as Jeremiah
- Ken Lester as Big Jim
- Henry O. Arnold as Lenny
- Gary Gober as Kenny
- Lloyd Tatum as Deputy Wilson
- Roy Jenson as Haskins

== Production ==
An early version of the script was set in New Orleans, but filming moved to Tennessee after the success of Walking Tall. Scenes were filmed at the Tennessee State Prison, with real inmates and security guards appearing as extras. Other scenes were filmed in downtown Nashville, the Tennessee State Capitol, and at Smyrna Airport.

== Reception ==
Roger Ebert of the Chicago Sun-Times gave the film a negative review, writing "Framed is a nasty little specimen. It gives us Joe Don Baker in another one of those grade-zilch action pictures he’s been grinding out lately, but this one doesn’t have just the routine violence we’ve come to expect. It’s mean."

== Home media ==
The film was released on Blu-Ray by boutique label Kino Lorber in February 2017.

== See also ==
- List of American films of 1975
