= Shiner (2004 film) =

- DVD Cover to Shiner
- Directed by: Christian Calson
- Written by: Christian Calson
- Starring: Scott Stepp; Derris Nile; Nicholas T. King; David Zelina; Carolyn Crotty; Seth Harrington; Conny Van Dyke
- Distributed by: TLA Releasing
- Release date: 2004
- Running time: 89 minutes
- Country: United States
- Language: English

Shiner is a 2004 film written and directed by Christian Calson and starring Scott Stepp, Derris Nile, Nicholas T. King, David Zelina, Carolyn Crotty, Seth Harrington, Conny Van Dyke

== Plot ==
Shiner explores three relationships in which some form of abuse is not only involved but savored. The central story involves Tony and Danny, two friends whose relationship changes once Danny discovers that he becomes sexually satisfied when Tony physically abuses him. Another storyline involves Tim, an out of work boxer who is being stalked by Bob, a shy loner who still lives at home with his mother. Third is Reg and Linda, who discover their sex life improves when they hit each other during the act.

== Cast ==
- Scott Stepp as Tony
- Derris Nile as Danny
- Ryan Soteres as Charles
- Carolyn Crotty as Linda
- Seth Harrington as Reg
- David Zelina as Tim
- Nicholas King as Bob
- Conny Van Dyke as Bob's mother

== Reviews ==
- "The homoerotic subtext many found in "Fight Club" is spelled out in "Shiner," about some ostensibly straight, even homophobic, guys whose sparring edges across the line between macho horseplay and sexual masochism. It takes a while to realize the laughs in writer/helmer Christian Colson's first feature are intentional—no-budget production values, deliberately awkward scene rhythms and minimalist character development make pic look at first very much like a solemnly silly fetish video. By the end, a sort of deliberate absurdity is clear, though this vid-shot exercise in behavioral extremity may be too rough-hewn and unratable for arthouse play." – Dennis Harvey, Variety
- "The only film that played at the Castro Theater during this festival so controversial that all 66 of our sponsors passed on it." – Michael Lumpkin, Festival Director – Frameline Film Festival
- "Rife with ugly behavior, Shiner rejects the trend of queer filmmakers seeking straight understanding." – Carla Meyer, San Francisco Chronicle
- "Most people will probably be put off by the relentless violence. But if you can stick it out, you will find yourself asking some Big Picture questions." – Steve Weinstein, New York Blade
