= Conny Van Dyke =

American singer (1945–2023)

- Van Dyke in Police Woman
- Born: September 28, 1945; Cape Charles, Virginia, U.S.
- Died: November 11, 2023 (aged 78); Los Angeles, California, U.S.
- Occupations: Actress; Singer
- Notable work: W.W. and the Dixie Dancekings; Framed
- Children: 1

Conny Van Dyke (September 28, 1945 – November 11, 2023), sometimes credited as Connie Van Dyke, was an American singer and actress.

== Biography ==
Conny Van Dyke was born in Cape Charles, Virginia on September 28, 1945, to Benjamin and Charlotte Elizabeth Van Dyke.

When she was 15 years old, Van Dyke made recordings, worked as a fashion model, and made her first film, Among the Thorns.

Van Dyke worked as a songwriter and recording artist for Wheelsville Records in Detroit, Michigan. She entered and won Teen magazine's Miss Teen of the United States in 1960 and signed with Motown Records in 1961, making her one of the first white recording artists for the label. Her only Motown release appeared in early 1963: "Oh Freddy", written by Smokey Robinson, backed with "It Hurt Me Too", written and previously recorded by Marvin Gaye.

Van Dyke was cast in Hell's Angels '69 with Tom Stern, Jeremy Slate, and several members of the Hells Angels motorcycle club. Her only sibling, Benjamin Van Dyke III, was killed in an auto accident near Salinas, California, in 1969. Shortly after Hell's Angels '69, she married Robert Page and gave birth to a son, Bronson Page. She continued to pursue recording, and released a self-titled album in 1972. She co-starred in W.W. and the Dixie Dancekings with Burt Reynolds, and in Framed, with Joe Don Baker, both in 1975. Another album, Conny Van Dyke Sings for You, was released following the film.

In 2004 she co-starred in Shiner. Van Dyke also appeared on Adam-12, Nakia, and Police Woman, and on several game shows in the 1970s, including Match Game, You Don't Say, The Cross-Wits, The Hollywood Squares, Tattletales, and The Gong Show. In 2008 she made a return to network television, guest-starring on Cold Case; she appeared on CSI the following year.

Shortly after her return to television in 2008, Van Dyke suffered a massive stroke, which left her partially paralyzed and marked the beginning of her retirement. After this, she lived in Los Angeles, and was cared for by her son Bronson.

Van Dyke died of complications from vascular dementia in Los Angeles, on November 11, 2023, at the age of 78.

== Personal life ==
Van Dyke was married six times. Her first marriage to George Fisher was annulled in 1966 after three years. She married Douglas Runyon in 1968, with whom she had her only child. After divorcing Runyon, she married Los Angeles disk jockey Larry Coates in 1971. She and Coates made several appearances on Tattletales. She and Coates divorced in 1976 and she was married to Douglas Dunham from 1978 to 1985. Afterwards, she was married to Emilio Acevedo from December 1988 to February 1990. Her final marriage was to Ernest Guerra from January 1997 to August 2003 before they divorced.
