= Arnie Kantrowitz =

American activist and author (1940–2022)

Arnie Kantrowitz (November 26, 1940 – January 21, 2022) was an American LGBT activist and college professor. He wrote three books, including a posthumously published novel, and contributed articles, essays, poems and short fiction to magazines, newspapers and anthologies.

== Early life and education ==
Kantrowitz was born in Newark, New Jersey, and graduated from Weequahic High School, before moving to nearby Elizabeth with his mother and siblings after his parents divorced. He received a B.A. from Rutgers University–Newark (1961); an M.A. in English Literature from New York University (1963); and completed coursework toward a Ph.D. at New York University. He was Jewish.

== Career ==
He taught at the State University of New York College at Cortland from 1963 to 1965 and then at the College of Staten Island, City University of New York from 1965 until he retired in 2006. Kantrowitz was among the first to teach courses in gay literature, beginning in 1973 with "Homosexuals and Literature." He became chairman of the English department in 1999.

He came out as gay in 1970. He was an early secretary and later vice-president of the pioneering New York City group Gay Activists Alliance.

In the early 1970s, he was one of the first openly gay individuals to appear on popular radio and television shows, including those of Jack Paar (Jack Paar Tonite), Geraldo Rivera, Bill Boggs and Sally Jesse Raphael. He also appeared in several documentary films, including After Stonewall (1999), Positive (1990), Gay Sex in the 70s (2005), and Vito (2011).

He was also interviewed about gay liberation and the AIDS epidemic.

Kantrowitz's autobiography Under the Rainbow was published in 1977 and reprinted in 1978; a new edition appeared in 1996. It was one of the first autobiographies by a gay rights activist.

In October 1985, Kantrowitz joined Gregory Kolovakis, Darrell Yates-Rist, Vito Russo, Jim Owles, Allen Barnett and Barry Adkins in helping to form the Gay and Lesbian Anti-Defamation League, renamed the Gay and Lesbian Alliance Against Defamation (GLAAD). The organization's original purpose was to respond to the inaccurate and slanderous portrayals of gay and lesbian people that were widespread in the early years of the AIDS epidemic.

Kantrowitz' second book, a biography of poet Walt Whitman, called Walt Whitman: Gay and Lesbian Writers, appeared in 2005 as part of the Stonewall Inn Classics series on the lives of gay and lesbian writers published by Chelsea House Publishers/St. Martin's Press.

In 2009, Kantrowitz was elected grand marshal of the Staten Island Gay Pride parade and was awarded a testimonial citation from the New York State Assembly in recognition of his decades of gay activism. His personal papers for the years 1951 to 2008 are on deposit with the New York Public Library.

== Personal life and death ==
Kantrowitz lived in New York City with his life partner, Lawrence D. Mass, a physician and writer. He died from complications of COVID-19 at a rehabilitation center in Manhattan on January 21, 2022, at the age of 81, during the COVID-19 pandemic in New York City.

== Selected writings ==
Books

- Under the Rainbow: Growing Up Gay, William Morrow and Co., 1977; Second Edition: Pocketbooks, Inc., 1978. Third Edition: St. Martin's Press, 1996.
- Walt Whitman: Gay and Lesbian Writers, Chelsea House Publishers, 2005.
- Song of Myself: A Novel, Sentinel Voices, 2024.

Essays in anthologies

- Friends Gone With the Wind, in Personal Dispatches: Writers Confront AIDS, edited by John Preston, St. Martin's Press, pp. 13–26.
- Family Album, in Friends and Lovers: Gay Men Write About the Families They Create, edited by John Preston with Michael Lowenthal, Dutton, pp. 281–300.
- Such a Polite Little Boy, in Sissies and Tomboys: Gender Nonconformity and Homosexual Childhood, edited by Matthew Rottnek, New York University Press, 1995, pp. 226–235.
- Greenwich Village, New York in Hometowns: Gay Men Write About Where they Belong, edited by John Preston, Dutton, 1991, pp. 258–271.
- A Date with Judith, with Judith P. Stelboum, in Sister and Brother: Lesbians and Gay Men Write About Their Lives Together, edited by Joan Nestle and John Preston, Harper San Francisco, pp. 273–286.
- Swastika Toys, in Leatherfolk, edited by Mark Thompson, pp. 193–209.
- Growing up Gay, in The Conscious Reader, edited by Caroline Shrodes, Harry Finestone and Michael Shugrue, Pearson Education, Inc., 1994, pp. 544–547.
- An Enemy of the People, in We Must Love One Another or Die: The Life and Legacies of Larry Kramer, edited by Lawrence D. Mass, Cassell, 1997, pp. 97–114.
- Humor, in The Gay and Lesbian Literary Heritage, edited by Claude J. Summers, Henry Holt and Company, 1995, pp. 375–380.

Essays in periodicals

- "We Are Already Your Children". New York Times. September 1, 1973.
- Kantrowitz, Arnie (November 1974). "Homosexuals and Literature". College English. 36 (3): 325–330. doi:10.2307/374844. JSTOR 374844.
- A Gay Struggles with the New Acceptance, The Village Voice, Nov. 17, 1975, pp. 36, 39.
- The Boys in the Back Room, The Advocate, May 31, 1978, pp. 40–41.
- Who Killed Gay Lit? Gaysweek, Sept. 18, 1978, pp. 8–9.
- The Death of Peter Pan, Gay News, London, England, Oct. 16, 1980, p. 201.
- The Day Gay Lib Died, New York Native, November 2–15, 1981, pp. 1, 14–15.
- The Synagogue, The Saint and The Mineshaft, The Advocate, April 15, 1982, p 33.
- Minority's Minority Steps from the Shadows: Gay Male S/M Activists, The Advocate, May 29, 1984
- Bette and Me, The Woman Gay Men Love to Quote, The Advocate, September 19, 1984, pp. 33.
- Letter to the Queer Generation, NYQ, No. 20, March 15, 1992, pp. 39–42.
- How Gay was Walt Whitman? The Harvard Gay and Lesbian Review, Spring 1998, Vol .V, No. 2, pp. 7–9.
- "What Became of the Spirit of '69". The Harvard Gay & Lesbian Review. 6 (3): 25. Summer 1999 – via Gale Literature Resource Center.
- Walt Whitman's Manly Love of Comrades, White Crane, Fall 2007 No. 74. pp. 27–31.
