= Flirting with Anthony =

Flirting With Anthony
- Directed by: Christian Calson
- Written by: Christian Calson
- Starring: Daniel Cartier; Lowe Taylor; Ryan A. Allen; Linus; Mink Stole
- Distributed by: TLA Releasing
- Release date: 2005
- Running time: 88 minutes
- Country: United States
- Language: English

Flirting with Anthony is a 2005 released film written and directed by Christian Calson.

== Plot ==
Anthony is a member of a gang. As a revenge for something not clearly said, he gets caught and placed by Jack and another man into a garage. Here Jack is torturing and sexually abusing Anthony. Bruno comes into the garage and is doing the same while Jack is leaving, although he comes back rescues Anthony and both starting in return torturing Bruno. They go away leaving wounded Bruno in the garage. Some times later Anthony lives together with Donna and her gay brother. While they were playing at home, Donna receives a phone call, telling her that her father died. Anthony and Donna decide to drive to the funeral. On their long journey they meet several people. For the nights, they stay in motels and have sexy plays with two male prostitutes, one called in by Anthony. The other called in on the next night by Donna. In their journey they also meet Jack; the second time at a petrol station, where Anthony and Jack have sex in the toilets. Anthony falls for Jack and decides to stay with him, while Donna decided to leave them and is driving home.

== Cast ==
- Daniel Cartier as Anthony
- Lowe Taylor as Donna
- Linus as Jack
- Ryan A. Allen as Leroy
- Andrew Sears as Bruno (billed as Ward Montgomery)
- Mink Stole as Psychic
- Judy Tenuta as Jayleen the Motel Lady
- Brian Grillo as Tommy
- Don Allen as Johnnie
- Ruby Boofont as Ruby
- Vicky Boofont as Vicky
- Alex Garner as Colt
- Edward Hibbs as Rodney
- Heather Meyer as Mona
- Mr. Dan as Crazy Foreign Lady
- David Sivits as Sean
- Carl Strecker as Carl

== Reviews ==
- What's really going on here is Calson projecting his own sexual fantasies (bondage, jockstraps, seedy motel rooms) onto the screen, and for that you have to give him some credit. How many of us have the ambition to gather the money and people to bring our darkest desires to life right in front of our own eyes?
- Flirting with Anthony is a failed experiment in combining gay sex with violent imagery.
