= Lawrence D. Mass =

American physician and AIDS activist

- Born: June 11, 1946 (age 79); Macon, Georgia
- Education: University of California at Berkeley
- Occupations: Physician and writer
- Known for: Co-founder of Gay Men's Health Crisis, wrote the first press reports on AIDS
- Medical career
- Field: Psychiatry
- Institutions: Massachusetts General Hospital
- Sub-specialties: HIV, hepatitis C, STDs, gay health, psychiatry, sex research, music, opera, and culture
- Notable works: We Must Love One Another Or Die: The Life and Legacies of Larry Kramer, Confessions of a Jewish Wagnerite: Being Gay and Jewish in America, Homosexuality and Sexuality: Dialogues of The Sexual Revolution, Volume 1

Lawrence D. Mass (born June 11, 1946) is an American physician and writer. A co-founder of Gay Men's Health Crisis, he wrote the first press reports in the United States on the illness that later became known as AIDS. He is the author of numerous publications on HIV, hepatitis C, STDs, gay health, psychiatry and sex research, and on music, opera, and culture. He is also the author/editor of four books/collections. In 2009 he was in the first group of physicians to be designated as diplomates of the American Board of Addiction Medicine. Since 1979, he has lived and worked as a physician in New York City, where he resided with his life partner, writer and activist Arnie Kantrowitz. Having written for the New York Native since the 1970s, he currently writes a column for The Huffington Post. An archival collection of his papers are at the New York Public Library.

== Biography ==
Mass was born in Macon, Georgia, in 1946, received his B.A. from the University of California at Berkeley in 1969, and his M.D. from the University of Illinois's Abraham Lincoln School of Medicine in 1973.

Completing his residency in anesthesiology at Boston's Massachusetts General Hospital (in association with Harvard Medical School), Mass encountered homophobia during his interviews in Chicago for a residency in psychiatry when he disclosed that he was gay. This treatment became the catalyst for his activism that he pursued via journalism, making him the first openly gay physician to write on a regular basis for the gay press.

=== Early focus on psychiatry ===
Mass focused initially on the field of psychiatry, which retained many of its past homophobic practitioners, practices and positions even after the American Psychiatric Association in 1973 declassified homosexuality as a mental disorder. Besides writing for the gay press, Mass became newsletter editor for the Gay Caucus of Members of the American Psychiatric Association, the fledgling organization of gay psychiatrists that began organizing in the aftermath of the declassification. Under Mass, the newsletter ran politically charged headlines such as its first, "Psychoanalytic Statute Prevents Legal Entry of Gay Aliens," calling attention to the fact that discredited psychoanalytic theories of "the homosexual" as a form of "psychopathic personality" were still sources of discriminatory public policies.

=== Writing for the gay press ===
His writing for the gay press examined the leading roles of sociology and sex research in shaping contemporary thinking about sexuality and homosexuality. Mass chronicled the shift in academic and scientific thinking about homosexuality and sexuality. He conducted and published many interviews with such leading figures in the discourse as Judd Marmor, Richard Pillard, Thomas Szasz, John Money, Charles Silverstein, Masters and Johnson, Richard Green, Mary Calderone, John Boswell, John D'Emilio and Estelle Freedman, and Martin Duberman. A selection of these interviews is republished in his two Dialogues of the Sexual Revolution collections.

As a physician writing for the gay press, Mass also was one of the first to address the 1970s spread of a number of sexually transmitted diseases, including syphilis, gonorrhea, hepatitis B and amebiasis. In May 1981, Mass authored the first press report appearing in the New York Native, followed in July 1981 by the first feature article, "Cancer in the Gay Community," on the then-new HIV/AIDS epidemic. "Disease Rumors Largely Unfounded" was the headline of Mass's article. The New York Native cover story was among the opening displays of the Newseum in Arlington, Va., now in Washington, DC. Mass continues to report on HIV/AIDS.

=== Co-founder of Gay Men's Health Crisis ===
In 1982, Mass joined Larry Kramer, Edmund White, Paul Rapoport, Paul Popham and Nathan Fain in co-founding Gay Men's Health Crisis (GMHC), the world's first and still largest AIDS information and service organization. For 10 years, through four revisions, Mass authored GMHC's guide, Medical Answers About AIDS, which usually concluded with an appeal for civil liberties for sexual minority persons and the sanctioning of same sex relationships as "essential considerations in the preventive medicine of AIDS and other STDs."

At the start of the AIDS epidemic, the issue of anti-Semitism also interested Mass. As described on the dust jacket of his memoir, "Confessions of a Jewish Wagnerite":

In 1981, Lawrence Mass was a 35-year-old physician, writer, and gay activist living in New York City. On his living room wall, among other opera memorabilia, there were five pictures of Richard Wagner, one of them a drawing by Mass himself. While researching what would become the first feature article on the epidemic that later became known as AIDS, the author had the first confrontation of his adult life with overt anti-Semitism, an incident he was completely unprepared to deal with psychologically. As AIDS spread, and every sexually active gay man was forced to confront his own mortality, the need to understand the even greater depths of fear touched by the incident became urgent, and Mass began to face the reality that his life had been dominated by internalized anti-Semitism, even as he came to grips with his gay identity.

"Confessions of a Jewish Wagnerite" is the story of Mass's voyage of discovery from his adolescent infatuation with Wagner to his friendship with the great-grandson of the composer and life-partnership with a fellow gay activist and Jewish-American writer.

=== Editor of anthology on Larry Kramer ===
Mass's entangled concerns about Jews, Jewishness, anti-Semitism, and the internalization of antisemitism provide an unanticipated lens through which to view the subject of his subsequent book, a collection on the life and legacies of author and AIDS activist Larry Kramer.

The anthology We Must Love One Another or Die: The Life and Legacies of Larry Kramer begins with "Larry versus Larry," the story of Mass's sometimes stormy 40-year relationship with Kramer, and includes contributions from a number of key figures from the AIDS movement, including historical and critical evaluations by Rodger McFarlane, Anthony Fauci, Michelangelo Signorile, Gabriel Rotello, Tony Kushner, and John D'Emilio. While Kramer is likely to remain best known for his achievements around AIDS and grass roots activism, Mass was most inspired by Kramer's experience as a writer, especially his very personal voice, bravery and perseverance in the face of harsh criticism and rejection. Chapters by Andrew Holleran, Christopher Bram, Alfred Corn, Michael Denneny and others complete the picture of, as the dust jacket puts it, "one of the most original and influential voices of the twentieth century."

=== Ongoing interest in gay health issues ===
By the mid-1990s, thanks largely to the efforts of Kramer and ACT UP, HIV infection had become largely manageable with medical care, and gay activist concerns began to shift. Mass has continued to write about more recent health problems afflicting gay men, including the escalation of HIV among minority teens and the elderly, the crystal meth epidemic, hepatitis C and anal cancer.

Beginning in the late 1990s, Mass extended his public health interests to the bear subculture of the gay community. He has addressed in a regular column a range of health topics of interest to this subculture, initially consisting of middle-aged overweight men, first for American Bear Magazine and later for A Bear's Life magazine.

The papers of Mass and Kantrowitz are designated for deposit with the New York Public Library.

== Publications ==
=== Books ===
- On the Future of Wagnerism: Art, Intoxication, Addiction, Codependence and Recovery (Sentinel Voices, New York, copyright Lawrence D. Mass 2021) 701 pages
- We Must Love One Another Or Die: The Life and Legacies of Larry Kramer (St. Martin's Press/Griffin, New York, copyright Lawrence D. Mass 1997, 1999) 400 pages with index
- Confessions of a Jewish Wagnerite: Being Gay and Jewish in America (Cassell, Villard, London, 1994) 268 pages, Foreword by Dr. Gottfried Wagner (copyright of Foreword, Gottfried Wagner) 1994.
- Homosexuality and Sexuality: Dialogues of The Sexual Revolution, Volume 1 (Haworth/Harrington Park Press, 1990) 251 pages
- Homosexuality as Behavior and Identity: Dialogues of The Sexual Revolution, Volume II (Haworth/Harrington Park Press) 265 pages

=== Selected publications ===
- "Genocide By Sloth: AIDS Denialism, The Early Years and The Catastrophe in South Africa", Gay & Lesbian Review Worldwide, May–June 2011.
- "AIDS and Hepatitis C: Lessons from AIDS." from Emerging Illnesses and Society, Negotiating the Public Health Agenda, edited by Randall M. Packard et al., Johns Hopkins University Press, 2004.
- "C-Sick": feature article on Hepatitis C (New York Magazine), March 29, 1999.
- "Musical Closets: A Personal and Selective Documentary History of Outing and Coming Out in the Music World," from Taking Liberties: Gay Men's Essays on Politics, Culture and Sex, edited by Michael Bronski, A Richard Kasak Book, Masquerade, 1996, p 387-440.
- "Bears and Health": Bears on Bears: Interviews and Discussions, by Ron Jackson Suresha.
- "An Interview with Ned Rorem": Queering the Pitch: The New Gay and Lesbian Musicology, 2nd Edition by Gary C. Thomas.
- Introduction to The Golden Boy by James Melton (Haworth/Harrington Park).

=== Contributions to periodicals ===
- New York Native, Christopher Street, Gay City News, Opera Monthly, The Advocate, American Bear Magazine, A Bear's Life Magazine, Journal of Homosexuality, Journal of Gay and Lesbian Psychotherapy, The Huffington Post
