= The Gay Marriage Thing =

- Directed by: Stephanie Higgins
- Produced by: Lorre Fritchy
- Cinematography: Patrick Carey; Stephanie Higgins; Lorre Fritchy; Mandy Minichello; Gayle Green
- Edited by: Stephanie Higgins; Lorre Fritchy
- Music by: Jeanine Cowen
- Distributed by: The Cinema Guild
- Release date: 2005
- Running time: 47 minutes
- Country: United States
- Language: English

The Gay Marriage Thing is a 2005 documentary film directed by Stephanie Higgins, who attended the Emerson College film school graduate program. The film follows the heated debate over same-sex marriage in Massachusetts in 2004 through the perspective of a lesbian couple who wishes to legally marry, as that state became the first in the U.S. to grant same-sex marriages (although those marriages were not recognized by the federal government).

== Location ==
The film was shot entirely throughout Massachusetts.

== Synopsis ==
The Gay Marriage Thing follows Gayle and Lorre, thirtysomething college sweethearts who marked their 15th anniversary a year after the Massachusetts Supreme Court ruled a ban on same-sex marriage stating that it was unconstitutional.

The film includes footage of protests outside the Massachusetts State House, the churches of the Reverends Rich Wiesenbach and Carlton Smith, and the state legislature leading up to May 17, 2004, the first date same-sex couples could file for marriage licenses in Massachusetts.

== Interviews ==
The Gay Marriage Thing includes interviews with United Church of Christ Reverend Richard Wiesenbach, Massachusetts State Representative Kathi-Anne Reinstein, Unitarian Universalist Reverend Carlton Smith, as well as the featured couple and a multitude of man-on-the-street interviews.

== Distribution ==
In 2005 the Cinema Guild released the film on DVD in the United States.

== Film Festivals ==
Artivist Film Festival Los Angeles – November 11, 2006

Boston Gay and Lesbian Film/Video Festival – May 21, 2006

Boston Jewish Film Festival – November 8, 2004 (sneak preview work in progress)

Breckenridge Festival of Film, Colorado – September 10, 2005

Camden International Film Festival, Maine – September 30, 2005

Maine Jewish Film Festival – March 14, 2005

New England Film and Video Festival, Massachusetts – October 9, 2005

New Hampshire Film Expo – October 15, 2005

Chicago Reeling Film Festival – November 4, 2005

Reel Identities Film Festival – New Orleans – June 11, 2005 *2nd place audience favorite

Rhode Island International Film Festival – August 11, 2005

Women on Film Festival Key West, FL – September 5, 2007
