= Peter Berlin =

German-American photographer, artist, filmmaker, and clothing designer

- Born: Armin Hagen von Hoyningen-Huene; 28 December 1942 (age 83); Lodz, General Government (now Poland)
- Other names: Peter Burian (credited in film)
- Occupations: Photographer; artist; filmmaker (as producer, director and screenwriter); clothing designer; model
- Family: George Hoyningen-Huene (Great Uncle)

Armin Hagen Freiherr von Hoyningen-Huene (born 28 December 1942) is a German-American photographer, artist, filmmaker, clothing designer/sewer, and model best known by his stage name Peter Berlin.

His two films, Nights in Black Leather (1973) and That Boy (1974) (credited in the latter as Peter Burian) helped bring gay male erotic films artistic legitimacy.

== Early life ==
Peter Berlin was born on December 28, 1942, in German-occupied Litzmannstadt (now Łódź), Poland, but he grew up in an aristocratic family in Berlin, Germany. He is the second of the three children. The extended family included the Russian American 1920s and 1930s fashion photographer George Hoyningen-Huene.

== Photography ==
He received post-secondary education in Germany as a photo-technician. In his early 20s, he worked as a photographer for an interview program on German television, photographing some of Europe's celebrities and film stars, including Alfred Hitchcock, Catherine Deneuve, Brigitte Bardot and Klaus Kinski

== Fashions ==
Berlin designed and sewed all of his clothing without a pattern. He also was a painter and illustrator. He began photographing himself in erotic poses and making skin-tight clothes to wear as he cruised the parks and train stations of Berlin, and the streets of Rome, Paris, New York and San Francisco. Many of his designs are now seen in the fashion works of such international designers such as Jean Paul Gaultier.

== Filmmaking and celebrity ==
In the early 1970s, Berlin moved to San Francisco and became a fixture on the streets with his highly suggestive clothing and constant cruising. He collaborated with friend Richard Abel on a 16 mm hard-core porn film entitled Nights in Black Leather (1973) in which he played the lead role. Berlin's poster for the film helped make Nights in Black Leather an underground hit.

As a follow-up, Berlin directed, produced, wrote, and starred in That Boy (1974). He also made four short films in the mid- to late-1970s, which were primarily sold as 8 mm "loops" by mail order. His self-portraits were published and sold. He was also the subject of several Robert Mapplethorpe photographs, five drawings by Tom of Finland, and at least one photograph by Andy Warhol. Two Robert Mapplethorpe Polaroid images of Berlin can be seen in the 2008 book, Mapplethorpe: Polaroids, and the Whitney Museum of American Art exhibition of the same name. Some of his famous friends were Salvador and Gala Dali, Warhol, New York fashion designer Koos, and painter Jochen Labriola. He was acquainted with ballet dancer Rudolf Nureyev.

== Photography ==
Berlin's photographs and artwork have been exhibited around the world, including the exhibition "Split/Vision" (New York, 1986), curated by Mapplethorpe, and in the exhibition "Berlin on Berlin" (2006) at the Leslie Lohman Gallery in New York.

Although he retreated from the limelight in the 1980s, he continues to make videos of himself and lives quietly in San Francisco, where he is still frequently recognized on the streets.

He was trained in Germany as a photo technician in the 1960s.

== Comeback ==
In 2005, filmmaker and writer Jim Tushinski directed and co-produced (with Lawrence Helman), the feature-length documentary That Man: Peter Berlin, which began a resurgence of interest in Berlin's works. The documentary premiered at the 2005 Berlin Film Festival and garnered several awards at film festivals worldwide, reconnecting Berlin with his older fans and introducing him to a new generation. In 2006, Berlin launched a web site devoted to his work.

In 2025, Permission to Stare, a new retrospective exhibition of Berlin's work, was presented by Mariposa Gallery during Frieze Los Angeles.

== Filmography ==
Long features

- 1973: Nights in Black Leather (actor)
- 1974: That Boy (director, producer, writer, actor)

Documentary

- 2005: That Man: Peter Berlin

Shorts

- 1973: Waldeslust
- 1974-6: Search
- 1974-6: Ciro and Peter
- 1976-7: Blueboys

== Awards ==
- 2007: GayVN Awards, Category: "2007 GayVN Hall of Fame Inductees"

== See also ==
- List of pornographic movie studios
- List of male performers in gay porn films

== Sources ==
- "Berlin on Berlin" interview by Robert W. Richards
- ManNet Review: "That Man: SE"
- That Man: Peter Berlin reviews by "Dom79" and "TheCygnet"

GayVN Awards Hall of Fame
2007
