= Christian Calson =

American film director

Christian Calson (born Claudiu Cristian Căldărescu on 13 January 1975 in Bucharest, Romania) is a Romanian-born American independent filmmaker best known for his use of anti-film and shock-cinema techniques.

== Biography ==
Calson was born to a Romanian father and a Jewish-Romanian mother. They left Bucharest when he was 7 years old and settled in Glendale, California. He went on to enroll at Antioch University in Los Angeles, California. Developing an interest in music at an early age, he eventually became a music writer for the now cancelled Los Angeles LGBT magazine "4-Front". Later Calson expanded his interests to include filmmaking.

Calson's films include Shiner and Flirting with Anthony. Rife with foul language and bad behavior, his characters and storylines are usually about sexual anxiety and a blurred line between sexuality and violence. He's been considered part of the NEW New Queer Cinema (Frameline) but he has strong feelings of displeasure at most mainstream queer cinema. With the release of Shiner, he told the San Francisco Chronicle, "I want people to respond on a visceral level... I'm not after their minds, I'm after their gut.... I'm not trying to make friends with this film."

Christian expanded his résumé again in 2008 by becoming a DJ. He describes his musical style as Underground House or Progressive house. Performing at various private parties, he now also DJs at several Los Angeles LGBT clubs and venues.

== Filmography ==
- Flirting with Anthony (feature film, 2005)
- Shiner (feature film, 2004)
- A Short Film About Flowers (an experimental short film, 2002)
- Beautiful / How To Walk Through A Door (short film, 2002)
- Moaner (short film, 2001)
