= Nights in Black Leather =

- Directed by: Richard Abel
- Produced by: Richard Abel; Peter Berlin
- Starring: Peter Berlin
- Cinematography: Richard Abel
- Edited by: Richard Abel
- Music by: Richard Abel
- Production company: Jaguar Studios
- Distributed by: Hand in Hand Productions
- Release date: 1973
- Running time: 99 minutes
- Country: United States
- Language: English

Nights in Black Leather is a 1973 gay pornographic film directed and co-produced by Richard Abel under the pseudonym Ignatio Rutkowski for Jaguar Studios, Abel was also responsible for cinematography, editing and music. The film's original title was Post Haste Hustle, but was changed by the distributor to Nights in Black Leather.

It is the first of just two gay porn films to feature German American photographer and model Peter Berlin to star as himself, credited in the film as Peter Burian, however following the threat of a lawsuit from another actor named Peter Burian, the main star changed his name to Peter Berlin and became hugely popular under the new name.

== Synopsis ==
A German immigrant (Peter Berlin) walks around in San Francisco looking for adventure. With scenes shot in North Beach, Land's End, and all over San Francisco, Nights in Black Leather is both an erotic romp and a time capsule of gay life in San Francisco in the early 1970s.

== Cast ==
- Peter Berlin (credited originally as Peter Burian)
- Rick Jedin
- Al Joffrey
- Jeff Salum
- Tom Webb

== Showings and legacy ==
The film became an international sensation, playing for months at adult cinemas in the US and Europe. Until recently, no known intact 16mm negative or print existed. Then someone associated with the release of the original film contacted Peter with news that the original negative was in storage in Southern California. This negative has been used to create a brand new 16mm print and both the negative and print are on loan to the Legacy Project, a film preservation joint venture between Outfest and the UCLA Film and Television Archives.

Film scholar Lucas Hilderbrand called Nights in Black Leather true to gay cruising culture in San Francisco and Santa Monica. He also noted how the film used cinéma vérité style, while maintaining the "fetishistic objectification" of its star, Peter Berlin.

== Awards ==
In 2007, the film won the GayVN Award for "Best Classic DVD".
