= Jonathan Weinberg =

American artist and art historian

- Born: 1957 (age 67–68); New York City
- Education: Fieldston School
- Alma mater: Yale University (B.A.); Harvard University (Ph.D. under T. J. Clark)
- Known for: Artist, art historian

Jonathan Weinberg (born 1957) is an American artist and art historian. He is a critic at the Yale School of Art.

== Early life ==
Weinberg grew up in New York City and attended the Fieldston School. He studied as an undergraduate at Yale University with Vincent Scully, and received his Ph.D. from Harvard University's Department of Fine Arts in 1990, where he studied under T. J. Clark. He began teaching at Yale in 1991.

=== Teaching career ===
Weinberg has been professor on the faculty of Yale's Department of the History of Art (1989–2001), a John Simon Guggenheim fellow, Mills fellow at the Metropolitan Museum of Art, Sterling fellow at the Clark Art Institute, as well as scholar and artist-in-residence at the Getty museum and research center in Los Angeles.

== Paintings ==
His paintings have been the subject of over twenty one-person shows, and are in the permanent collections of the Metropolitan Museum of Art, the Reader's Digest Collection, as well as other museums and private collections. Writing for the catalogue (Amusements, Paintings and Prints by Jonathan Weinberg) of Weinberg's 1997 show at New York's Cortland Jessup Gallery, his former co-student at Yale Vincent Scully wrote:

Weinberg's are willfully difficult paintings, consciously serious. He believes that it is the duty of a modern painter to try to do difficult things. Until recently he did not show some of the work that an unprejudiced, perhaps naive, observer like myself might regard as among his best: his sun-drenched little acrylics, for example, and his big watercolors, generous in scale and monumentally constructed. For both these types, Weinberg's motif is the beach, not the city. How fundamentally New Yorkish that seems, distinguishing between the dual environments of its artists' lives, the beach where you relax, the city where all the tough stuff goes on.

== Published work ==
Weinberg has published widely. Linda Nochlin, writing about Weinberg's Ambition and Love in Modern American Art (Yale, 2001) in Art in America, called it "one of the best books on American art of any period that I have ever read," "an exemplary text," and "rare that such a perfect fit between style and substance occurs in the writing of an art historian." Nochlin and others have noted that Weinberg's work is cogent while being extremely well written and researched; with none of the theory or jargon that has turned so many away from the academy.

=== Publications ===
- Speaking for Vice: Homosexuality in the Art of Charles Demuth, Marsden Hartley and the First American Avant-Garde (Yale, 1993)
- Ambition and Love in Modern American Art (Yale, 2001)
- Male Desire: The Homoerotic in American Art (Abrams, 2005)
- Fantastic Tales: The Photography of Nan Goldin (Penn State, 2005)
- editor, Eugene D. Glynn, Desperate Necessity: Writings on Art and Psychoanalysis, with an introduction by Jonathan Weinberg (Periscope, 2008)
- co-editor, The Social and the Real: Political Art of the 1930s in the Western Hemisphere, an anthology edited with Alejandro Anreus and Diana L. Linden (Penn State, 2006).
- co-editor, We're Here: The Gay and Lesbian Presence in Art, a special issue of the Art Journal, co-edited with Flavia Rando, (Winter 1996) [Vol. 55, no. 4]
- Pier Groups: Art and Sex Along the New York Waterfront. University Park, PA: Penn State University Press, 2019. ISBN 978-0-271-08217-2.
