= Rodger McFarlane =

American gay rights and AIDS activist (1955–2009)

- Born: February 25, 1955; Mobile, Alabama, US
- Died: May 15, 2009 (aged 54); Truth or Consequences, New Mexico, US
- Known for: Gay rights and AIDS activist

Rodger Allen McFarlane (February 25, 1955 – May 15, 2009) was an American gay rights activist who served as the first paid executive director of the Gay Men's Health Crisis and later served in leadership positions with Broadway Cares/Equity Fights AIDS, Bailey House and the Gill Foundation.

== Biography ==
McFarlane was born on February 25, 1955, in Mobile, Alabama and was raised on the family's soybean and chicken farm in Theodore, Alabama. The 6-foot, 7-inch (2.01 m) McFarlane played American football in high school, where he was "a monster, a legend", who was "big enough to get past the gay thing" playing football and could then "go jump rope with the girls." He attended the University of South Alabama. He enlisted in the United States Navy in 1974, serving on the USS Flying Fish (SSN-673) as a nuclear reactor technician. Following his military service, McFarlane moved to New York City in the late 1970s, where he worked as a respiratory therapist.

In the early 1980s, McFarlane walked into the offices of Gay Men's Health Crisis, offering to serve as a volunteer. He began a crisis counseling hotline that originated on his own home telephone, which ultimately became one of the organization's most effective tools for sharing information about AIDS. Shortly thereafter, he was named as the first paid executive director of GMHC, helping create a more formal structure for the nascent organization, which had no funding or offices when he took on the role. Larry Kramer, the playwright and gay rights activist who was one of the six founders of Gay Men's Health Crisis in 1982, became a friend of McFarlane's, describing that by the time of his death, "the GMHC is essentially what he started: crisis counseling, legal aid, volunteers, the buddy system, social workers" as part of an organization that serves more than 15,000 people affected by HIV and AIDS.

In December 1983, when GMHC was housed in rundown brownstone and served 250 people with AIDS, McFarlane lamented the inequitable treatment of gays by society at large, noting how "We were forced to take care of ourselves because we learned that if you have certain diseases, certain lifestyles, you can't expect the same services as other parts of society". McFarlane served as executive director until 1985.

McFarlane was one of the founding members of the New York branch of ACT UP.

He served as executive director of Broadway Cares/Equity Fights AIDS from 1989 until 1994, an organization that uses the talents and resources of the theatre industry to raise funds and distribute grants for AIDS-related causes. He also served as president of Bailey House, a not-for-profit organization that provides shelter for homeless people with AIDS. McFarlane served as the executive director of the Gill Foundation from 2004 until 2008, an LGBT organization founded by Tim Gill and based in Denver that which provides grants and operating support for not-for-profit and community foundations.

=== Personal ===
McFarlane lived in Manhattan for many years with his brother David, helping take care of him before David's death due to AIDS in 2002. Together with Philip Bashe, he wrote the 1998 book The Complete Bedside Companion: No-Nonsense Advice on Caring for the Seriously Ill, which was based on his personal experiences over more than two decades caring for his brother and other seriously ill friends and family members.

According to the dramaturgical information that Kramer passed out after performances of the 2011 revival of his 1985 work The Normal Heart (which was one of the first plays to address the HIV/AIDS crisis), that play's character named "Tommy" was based on McFarlane. Tommy was played by William DeAcutis in the 1985 original production and by Jim Parsons in the 2011 revival and in the 2014 film. Working together with Kramer, McFarlane was the co-producer of the 1993 production of The Destiny of Me, the Pulitzer Prize-nominated play that was the sequel to The Normal Heart. Shortly before his death, McFarlane wrote the afterword for Kramer's book The Tragedy of Today's Gays.

A resident of Denver, Colorado, McFarlane died by suicide at age 54 on May 15, 2009, in Truth or Consequences, New Mexico. McFarlane left a letter in which he indicated that he could no longer continue dealing with heart and back problems, which followed a broken back in 2002. He is survived by two brothers.

In an interview with The New York Times after McFarlane's death, Kramer spoke about his role at GMHC and described how "single-handedly Rodger took this struggling ragtag group of really frightened and mostly young men, found us an office and set up all the programs." Kramer told The Advocate that McFarlane "did more for the gay world than any person has ever done" and stated that "I don't think the gay world knew or knows how great he was and how much he did for us and how much we need him still and how much we will miss him."
