= Tom Bianchi =

American writer and photographer

- Born: 1 August 1945 (age 81); Oak Park, Illinois, United States
- Education: University of New Mexico; Northwestern University
- Occupations: Photographer and writer
- Website: tombianchi.com

Tom Bianchi (born 1945) is an American writer and photographer who specializes in male nude photography.

== Career ==
His 21 books of photographs, poems, and essays primarily cover the gay male experience.

In 1990, St. Martin's Press published Out of the Studio, Bianchi's book of male nudes, frankly gay and affectionally connected. Thereafter, 20 of Bianchi's books have been published, three documentary films about Bianchi's work have been distributed, and Bianchi's work has been published in more than thirty anthologies on the male nude. His On the Couch series, Deep Sex, Erotic Triggers and Fine Art Sex deal with the expression of conscious sexual energy. His book Fire Island Pines Polaroids 1975–1983, made with his partner, Ben Smales, was honored by Time magazine's list of the Best Photo Books of 2013.

== Personal life and AIDS activism ==
Bianchi was born and raised in the suburbs of Chicago. Bianchi studied political science at the University of New Mexico, and subsequently earned a J.D. degree at Northwestern University School of Law. He practiced corporate law for ten years in Chicago and Washington, D.C. At thirty-four, he left his position as senior counsel at Columbia Pictures, tore up his J.D. degree, pasted it into a painting and had his first one-man show with Betty Parsons and Carol Dreyfuss in New York. Shortly thereafter, he had his first major museum retrospective at the Spoleto Festival in 1984. Bianchi currently resides in Palm Springs, California.

== Bibliography ==
- Out of the Studio (1991)
- Living with Dickens (1993)
- Bob and Rod (1994)
- Extraordinary Friends (1995)
- In Defense of Beauty (1995)
- Bianchi: Outpost (1996)
- Among Women (1996)
- In the Studio (1998)
- Men I've Loved: Prose, Poems and Pictures (2001)
- On the Couch Vol. 1 (2002)
- On the Couch Vol. 2 (2004)
- Deep Sex (2006)
- Fire Island Pines (2013)
- 63 E 9th Street (2019)
