= Barton Lidice Beneš =

American artist (1942–2012)

Barton Lidice Beneš (November 16, 1942, Hackensack, New Jersey – May 30, 2012, New York) was an artist who lived and worked in New York City. He studied at Pratt Institute, Brooklyn, New York and Beaux-Arts, Avignon, France.

== Early life ==
Before Beneš attended Pratt Institute, he lived with his grandparents in Brooklyn, New York. As a teenager he made the U.S. Olympic speed skating team, while smoking a pack of cigarettes a day. It became clear around 17 years old that Beneš had a flair for the contradictory, and the romantic. He would often walk around the city bare foot saying “I thought it was romantic to be a pig”. Around this time in his life Beneš would sneak out and go to a mob-run gay bar named New Colony. While spending time there he was asked to complete an installation for customers to view. After being hired for his first piece he was given a job designing window installations for New Colony. While working for New Colony he met a man named Howard Meyer.

Beneš and Howard soon moved in with each other and began their careers from home. Not soon after in 1969 Beneš was contracted and put on his first exhibit “Leather and Lace”, a show involving him strapped naked to a padded leather table. He was then changed when he traveled to Africa to create his last painting. While in Africa his views of art evolved towards an obsession with Africa's tribal culture, artifacts, and erotica.

== Mid life ==
Following Beneš's trip to Africa his work became increasingly contradictory during the 70s and 80s. His art revolved around clever artistic puns (i.e. a book nailed shut in protest of freedom of speech). During this time he and his aunt Evelyn, who was interested in the stories of Barton's life in New York, would exchange letters. Fueled by speed she would write letters ranging from 50 to 60 pages. Barton would then turn the letters in to small intricate books.

While Beneš was using his aunt as a prompt for his art, a hustler that was hired by Beneš began an affair with his lover Howard. Aunt Evelyn who had begun writing to Bartons friends, also began writing to the hustler. During the affair the hustler responded to Aunt Evelyn informing her of what her letters were being used for. This led to a falling out between Beneš and his Aunt. She threatened to sue him, then immediately stopped all communication with her nephew. Later in life Beneš attempted to reconnect with his aunt, but his efforts were not successful.

In 1986 Howard Meyer was diagnosed with Kaposi's Sarcoma and Benĕs with AIDS. The next few years after he was diagnosed included the passing of a number of close friends. Three years afterwards Howard Meyers passed from his illness. This was the breaking point for Beneš as he watched his lover pass. Barton says that “When he died—it's crazy but true—I saw the energy leave his body, and I got on top of him to grab the energy.”. For the first time since Beneš was diagnosed with AIDS, he had an artistic impulse. He was inspired to use the emotions he was experiencing in his work. Beneš began to use his friends and their memories as mementos in his pieces.

Beneš made "museums" somewhat in the style of Joseph Cornell, which incorporate into shadow boxes bits and pieces that reveal the myths and ironies of life. The fragments in Beneš's museums often involve famous people and events, as do the sixteen collaged bits in this print, from a piece of Elizabeth Taylor's shoe to a crumb from the wedding cake of the Prince of Wales.

On one evening in 1990 Beneš cut his hand while preparing dinner. Being used to fact that his blood is toxic he rushed for bleach. Before retrieving the bleach however, he began to focus on the idea that his blood contained a dualistic meaning. Responding to the experience he began a series of pieces titled “Lethal Weapons”, a series of 8 shadow boxes, each containing a different weapon containing his blood. During the first showing of his exhibit in 1990 his pieces were disinfected at 160 degrees in a hospital oven while in Lund, Sweden due to the extreme level of discomfort that the patrons were experiencing.

After his diagnosis, Beneš became an advocate for the destigmatization of AIDS. From 2003 to 2009 he served on the board of Visual AIDS. His artwork became a visual representation of AIDS and its history. He turned his life from a victim of the disease to a terrorist. He would inflict symbolic violence on a judgemental society, his works of art showing the lethality of a disease. Beneš also explored the eroticism of his illness, using eroticism to cope with the world around him. When two of his friends died, he paid tribute to the couple by combining both of their ashes in a three-meter-high (9.8 ft) hourglass, symbolically binding his friends in death.

== Late life and death ==
Beneš's apartment in New York contained his collection of over $1 million worth of African, Egyptian, and contemporary art, as well as his own. After his death in 2012 the interior of his apartment, including his shadow box museums, was relocated and reconstructed at the North Dakota Museum of Art, under the supervision of his friend and colleague Laurel Reuter, director of the museum. The exhibit opened in late 2013 and is called Barton's Place.
