= List of LGBTQ-related films of 2001 =

This is a list of lesbian, gay, bisexual, transgender or queer-related films released in 2001. It contains theatrically released films that deal with important gay, lesbian, bisexual, transgender or queer characters or issues and may have same-sex romance or relationships as a plot device.

== Films ==
Title	Director	Country	Genre	Cast	Notes
All Over the Guy	Julie Davis	United States	Romance, comedy	Sasha Alexander, Dan Bucatinsky, Adam Goldberg, Joanna Kerns, Lisa Kudrow, Andrea Martin, Christina Ricci, Doris Roberts and Richard Ruccolo	
Blow Dry	Paddy Breathnach	United States; United Kingdom; Germany	Comedy	Alan Rickman, Natasha Richardson, Rachel Griffiths, Rachael Leigh Cook, Josh Hartnett, Bill Nighy, Rosemary Harris and Heidi Klum	
Bully	Larry Clark	United States; France	Crime, thriller	Brad Renfro, Bijou Phillips, Rachel Miner, Michael Pitt, Kelli Garner, Daniel Franzese, Leo Fitzpatrick and Nick Stahl	Based on the murder of Bobby Kent
By Hook or by Crook	Harry Dodge (listed as Harriet Dodge), Silas Howard	United States	Drama	Silas Howard, Harry Dodge, Stanya Kahn and Carina Gia	
Chicken	Barry Dignam	Ireland	Short	Darren Healy and Niall O'Shea	Only 3 minutes long
Circuit	Dirk Shafer	United States	Drama	Jonathan Wade Drahos, Andre Khabbazi, Brian Lane Green, Kiersten Warren, Paul Lekakis, William Katt and Nancy Allen	
Claire	Milford Thomas	United States	Fantasy	Toniet Gallego, Mish P. DeLight, James Ferguson, Pat Bell, Katherine Moore, Anna May Hirsch and Allen Jeffrey Rein	No dialogue
The Closet	Francis Veber	France	Comedy	Daniel Auteuil, Gérard Depardieu, Michel Aumont and Michèle Laroque	
Danny in the Sky	Denis Langlois	Canada	Drama	Richard Angrignon, Stéphanie Aubry, Jessie Beaulieu, Eric Benton, Véronique Jenkins and Eric Cabana	
The Deep End	Scott McGehee, David Siegel	United States	Mystery, thriller	Tilda Swinton, Goran Višnjić, Jonathan Tucker, Peter Donat, Josh Lucas and Raymond J. Barry	Very loosely adapted from the novel The Blank Wall by Elisabeth Sanxay Holding
A Family Affair	Helen Lesnick	United States	Comedy, romance	Helen Lesnick, Erica Shaffer, Arlene Golonka, Barbara Stuart, Michele Greene and Suzanne Westenhoefer	
Fish and Elephant	Li Yu	China	Drama	Pan Yi, Shitou, Zhang Qianqian and Zhang Jilian	
The Fluffer	Richard Glatzer, Wash Westmoreland	United States	Romance, comedy, drama	Scott Gurney, Michael Cunio, Roxanne Day, Taylor Negron, Richard Riehle and Deborah Harry	
Friends & Family	Kristen Coury	United States	Comedy	Greg Lauren, Christopher Gartin, Rebecca Creskoff, Edward Hibbert, Allison Mackie, Meshach Taylor, Beth Fowler and Frank Pellegrino	
Gasoline	Monica Stambrini	Italy	Crime	Maya Sansa, Regina Orioli, Mariella Valentini and Luigi Maria Burruano	
Get a Life	João Canijo	Portugal; France	Drama	Rita Blanco, Adriano Luz, Teresa Madruga, Alda Gomes and Olivier Leite	a.k.a. Ganhar a Vida
Gosford Park	Robert Altman	United Kingdom; United States	Crime, mystery	Eileen Atkins, Bob Balaban, Alan Bates, Charles Dance, Stephen Fry, Michael Gambon, Richard E. Grant, Derek Jacobi, Kelly Macdonald, Helen Mirren, Jeremy Northam, Clive Owen, Ryan Phillippe, Maggie Smith, Kristin Scott Thomas and Emily Watson	
Gypsy 83	Todd Stephens	United States	Drama	Sara Rue, Kett Turton, Karen Black, John Doe, Marlene Wallace, Anson Scoville and Paulo Costanzo	
Hedwig and the Angry Inch	John Cameron Mitchell	United States	Musical, comedy, drama	John Cameron Mitchell, Ben Mayer-Goodman, Miriam Shor, Stephen Trask, Andrea Martin, Michael Pitt, Theodore Liscinski, Rob Campbell, Michael Aronov and Alberta Watson	Based on the rock musical of the same name with music and lyrics by Stephen Trask and a book by Mitchell
Hey, Happy!	Noam Gonick	Canada	Science fiction, comedy	Jérémie Yuen, Craig Aftanis, Clayton Godson	
Hush!	Ryōsuke Hashiguchi	Japan	Drama	Seiichi Tanabe, Kazuya Takahashi, Reiko Kataoka, Tsugumi, Manami Fuji, Yoko Akino, Ken Mitsuishi, Minori Terada and Tetsu Sawaki	
I Am Not What You Want	Kit Hung	Hong Kong	Drama	Chet Lam, Lik Hang Hung, Joyee Lam and Ki Lok Chan	
I Love You Baby	Alfonso Albacete, David Menkes	Spain	Drama	Jorge Sanz, Santiago Magill and Tiaré Scanda	
The Ignorant Fairies	Ferzan Özpetek	Italy; France	Drama	Margherita Buy, Stefano Accorsi, Serra Yilmaz, Gabriel Garko, Erika Blanc, Andrea Renzi and Koray Candemir	a.k.a. Le fate ignoranti
Jan Dara	Nonzee Nimibutr	Thailand	Erotic, drama	Christy Chung, Patharawarin Timkul.Eakarat Sarsukh, Wipawee Charoenpura and Patharawarin Timkul	A lesbian relationship is featured as a subplot.
Julie Johnson	Bob Gosse	United States	Drama	Lili Taylor, Courtney Love, Spalding Gray, Noah Emmerich and Mischa Barton	
Karmen Geï	Joseph Gaï Ramaka	Canada, France, Senegal	Musical	Djeïnaba Diop Gaï, Stephanie Biddle, Magaye Adama Niang	Adaptation of the opera Carmen
Kissing Jessica Stein	Charles Herman-Wurmfeld	United States	Romance, comedy, drama	Jennifer Westfeldt, Heather Juergensen, Scott Cohen, Jackie Hoffman, Brian Stepanek, John Cariani and Michael Mastro	
L.I.E.	Michael Cuesta	United States	Drama	Brian Cox, Paul Dano, Billy Kay, Bruce Altman and Walter Masterson	
Lan Yu	Stanley Kwan	Hong Kong; China	Romance, drama	Hu Jun, Liu Ye, Su Jin, Li Huatong, Luo Fang, Zhang Yongning, Li Shuang, Zhao Minfen and Zhang Fan	
Lost and Delirious	Léa Pool	Canada	Romance, drama	Piper Perabo, Jessica Paré, Mischa Barton, Jackie Burroughs, Mimi Kuzyk, Graham Greene, Emily VanCamp and Caroline Dhavernas	Based on the novel The Wives of Bath by Susan Swan
Mulholland Drive	David Lynch	United States	Drama, mystery, thriller	Naomi Watts, Laura Harring, Justin Theroux, Ann Miller and Robert Forster	
Ordinary Sinner	John Henry Davis	United States	Romance, drama	Brendan Hines, Elizabeth Banks, Kris Park, A Martinez, Peter Onorati, Jesse Tyler Ferguson and Joshua Harto	
Princesa	Henrique Goldman	Spain; Italy; France; United Kingdom; Germany	Romance, drama	Ingrid de Souza, Cesare Bocci, Lulu Pecorari, Mauro Pirovano, Biba Lerhue, Sonia Morgan and Alessandra Acciai	Inspired by the book of the same name by Maurizio Janelli and Fernanda Farias de Albuquerque
The Road to Love	Rémi Lange	France	Drama	Karim Tarek, Riyad Echahi, Sihem Benamoune, Zakariya Gouram, Abdellah Taia, Mustapha Khaddar, Farid Tali	a.k.a. Tarik El Hob
Saturn's Return	Wenona Byrne	Australia	Short, drama	Joel Edgerton, Damian Walshe-Howling, Harold Hopkins and Tina Bursill	26 min long TV short film
Scout's Honor	Tom Shepard	United States	Documentary	Steven Cozza, James Dale	Best Documentary at Sundance Film Festival, GLAAD Media Award for Outstanding Documentary
Seven and a Match	Derek Simonds	United States	Comedy, Drama, Romance	Eion Bailey, Heather Donahue, Devon Gummersall, Tina Holmes, Adam Scott, Daniel Sauli, Petra Wright	
Shake It All About	Hella Joof	Denmark; Germany	Romance, comedy, drama	Mads Mikkelsen, Troels Lyby, Charlotte Munck, Jesper Lohmann and Oskar Walsøe	a.k.a. En Kort en lang
Southern Comfort	Kate Davis	United States	Documentary	Robert Eads	A documentary film about the final year in the life of Robert Eads, a transgender man from the southern United States, which influenced the portrayal of transgender characters going forward.
Stranger Inside	Cheryl Dunye	United States	Drama	Yolonda Ross, Davenia McFadden, Rain Phoenix, Ella Joyce, Conchata Ferrell, Lee Garlington and LaTonya 'T' Hagans	
Stuck	Jamie Babbit	United States	Short	Jennie Ventriss, Jeanette Miller and Eden Sher	Only 7 minutes long
Treading Water	Lauren Himmel	United States	Drama	Angela Redman, Nina Landey and Annette Miller	
Trembling Before G-d	Sandi Simcha DuBowski	Israel; France; United States	Documentary		Follows the lives of several gay and lesbian Orthodox Jews
A Woman's Love	Sylvie Verheyde	France	Drama	Hélène Fillières, Raffaëla Anderson, Anthony Delon, Jeannick Gravelines, William Wayolle and Karole Rocher	a.k.a. Amour de Femme
Y tu mamá también	Alfonso Cuarón	Mexico	Romance, comedy, drama	Gael García Bernal, Maribel Verdú, Diego Luna	
Yellow Hair 2	Kim Yu-min	South Korea	Drama	Harisu, Shin Yi, Mo Hong-jin and Yoon Chan	a.k.a. Norang meori 2
Zus & Zo	Paula van der Oest	Netherlands	Romance, comedy	Monic Hendrickx, Anneke Blok, Sylvia Poorta, Jacob Derwig and Halina Reijn	a.k.a. This and That
