= Traya =

Traya may refer to:

- Kreia, Darth Traya in video game Star Wars Knights of the Old Republic II: The Sith Lords
- Misti Traya (fl. 2004–2008), American actress
