= Living with Fran =

American television sitcom

- Genre: Sitcom
- Created by: David Garrett; Jason Ward; Josh H. Etting; Jamie Kennedy
- Starring: Fran Drescher; Ryan McPartlin; Misti Traya; Ben Feldman
- Composer: Paul Buckley
- Country of origin: United States
- Original language: English
- No. of seasons: 2
- No. of episodes: 26 (6 unaired)

Production
- Camera setup: Multi-camera
- Running time: 30 minutes
- Production companies: Fringe Producers; On Time and Sober Productions; Jizzy Entertainment; Uh-Oh Productions; Regency Television; Fox Television Studios

Original release
- Network: The WB
- Release: April 8, 2005 – March 24, 2006

Living with Fran is an American television sitcom that aired on The WB. It starred Fran Drescher and Ryan McPartlin, and was co-created by Jamie Kennedy. The series was produced by Fringe Producers, On Time and Sober Productions, Jizzy Entertainment, Uh-Oh Productions, Regency Television and Fox Television Studios. The series debuted on April 8, 2005, and ran two seasons before ending on March 24, 2006.

== Premise ==
Fran Reeves is an interior designer and divorced mother of two. Her son, Josh, recently dropped out of medical school and now lives at home with his younger sister, Allison, his mother and her young boyfriend, Riley Martin. Fran deals with the visits of her sleazy ex-husband, Ted, and her divorced cousin, Merrill. Fran also must deal with the fact that others, including her son, disapprove of the relationship she has with her much younger boyfriend. In the episode "Dreaming with Fran", Fran breaks up with Riley because of the age difference but in the next episode, Riley proposes to Fran.

== Cast ==
=== Main ===
- Fran Drescher as Fran Reeves – Fran plays an interior designer who is the mother of two. She had her first kid, Josh Reeves, at seventeen.
- Ryan McPartlin as Riley Douglas Martin – Riley is Fran's younger boyfriend who is twenty-six years old.
- Misti Traya as Allison Reeves – Allison is Fran's fifteen-year-old daughter. She and her brother Josh do not get along all the time. Unlike Josh, she does not seem to mind her mother dating a younger man.
- Ben Feldman as Josh Reeves – Josh is Fran's twenty-one-year-old son who dropped out of medical school. It is revealed that he was forced to go in the first place because of his father, but could not handle the sight of blood. He starts working at a video store. Unlike Allison, he is opposed to his mother dating a younger guy, and often makes fun of the two by comparing their ages. Despite this, he gets along quite well with Riley's father upon his appearance. He has nothing but contempt for his father and the two make barbs against each other every time they see each other.

=== Recurring ===
- Charles Shaughnessy as Ted Reeves – Ted Reeves is Fran's ex-husband. He is a surgical doctor, and the man who forced Josh into medical school. He is something of a confidence trickster. He is described in one episode as being unsupportive of Josh's dreams. He later makes an appearance in person, and seems to have a poor relationship with his kids, mainly Josh. He enjoys making fun of his son, Riley, and Fran during his appearances, but takes more "kindly" to his daughter, Allison. He also flirts a lot with younger women.
- Debi Mazar as Merrill – Merill is Fran's unmarried cousin who appears in several episodes. She later gets hooked up with one of Riley's friends, and in season two, she is engaged. During her engagement party in the last episode, Riley and Fran are broken up.
- Caitlin Crosby as Becca – Allison's best friend who at one point had a crush on Josh, which temporarily ruined her friendship with Allison until Josh told her he was not interested. She appears in several episodes in both season one and two, spending time with Allison. She plays the guitar and sings, later revealed in season two when she sings at Merill's engagement party in the episode "Reuniting with Fran".

=== Guest ===
- Marilu Henner as Donna Martin – Donna is Riley's mother who always makes rude comments about Fran's age, even comparing her to an antique. This amuses Fran's son, Josh. By the end of the episode, however, she and Fran start to get along better after he ends up in the hospital for a cut. After her first appearance, Donna makes no more appearances in person, but does call during the arrival of her daughter, Jenny, making sure she is okay.
- John Schneider as Tom Martin – Tom is Riley's father. Unlike his wife, he is not as rude, and supports his son in everything he does. He and Josh get along very well in the series, forming a father-and-son-like relationship.
- Lauren Woodland as Jenny Martin – Jenny is Riley's younger sister around Josh's age. She innocent and sweet, and Donna appears to be quite protective of her, calling Fran repeatedly before her arrival. She and Josh accidentally get married after they get drunk, but their marriage is terminated later based on the circumstances. She is engaged to be married.
- Hal Linden as Grandpa Hal – Hal is Cookie's husband and Fran's father. According to the family members, he "hates" Riley and believes Fran is taking care of him. He loses all his money to Riley in a bet, but Riley uses the money to send him and his wife on a vacation, possibly resolving their differences.
- Ryan Devlin as Todd – Todd is Allison's older boyfriend who is disliked by Fran and Riley. In season 2 he is dumped by Allison after lying to her.
- Lainie Kazan as "Nana" Cookie – Cookie is Fran's mother. She likes Riley, but her relationship with her daughter is another story. Whenever Fran tries to make a decision, she claims she is not going to say anything, but ends up disagreeing with her decision anyhow and then pointing out her mistakes. She also blames Fran for her missing a concert because she got into an accident on the exact day that Cookie was going to go see it.

== Production ==
The series was originally titled Shacking Up, and was ordered to series by The WB for the 2004–05 television season, though it ultimately did not premiere in fall 2004 and was held for midseason. The early tapings of the show frustrated star Fran Drescher, and the series' original showrunners were replaced before the show ever aired. It was not renamed until very close to its premiere; episodes of television entertainment shows like Extra can be found on the internet discussing the show with the cast and previewing clips while still calling it Shacking Up.

The series was executive produced by actor and comedian Jamie Kennedy, known for his roles in the Scream (franchise). He also appeared on an episode of the first season as a flamboyant, stripper-coach Fran hires to surprise Riley for their anniversary.

On October 18, 2005, The WB removed Living with Fran from its Friday night schedule, replacing with the new series Twins, indicating that the series was just being put on hiatus and that the remaining nine episodes of the second season would air at a later date. The show returned Friday, January 13, 2006, at 8:30 p.m. The second-season finale aired on Friday, March 24, 2006. In the episode, Riley proposed to Fran; the episode was a cliffhanger, and Fran's answer was not revealed. On May 17, 2006, one day before the upfront, it was announced that Living with Fran would not be returning for a third season in fall 2006 on the new CW network, which was the result of the merger of the former WB and UPN networks.

== Episodes ==
Season	Episodes	Originally released	
Season	Episodes	First released	Last released
1	13	April 8, 2005	May 13, 2005
2	13	September 16, 2005	March 24, 2006

=== Season 1 (2005) ===
No. overall	No. in season	Title	Directed by	Written by	Original release date	Prod. code	US viewers (millions)
1	1	"Pilot"	Jeff Melman	Jamie Kennedy & Josh Etting & David Garrett & Jason Ward	April 8, 2005	13-04-179	3.16
2	2	"Riley's Parents"	Wil Shriner	David Garrett & Jason Ward	April 8, 2005	13-04-110	4.42
3	3	"The Ex Factor"	Steve Zuckerman	Frank Lombardi & Tim Kelleher	April 15, 2005	13-04-111	3.74
4	4	"The Reunion"	Steve Zuckerman	David Regal & Cindy Caponera	April 22, 2005	13-04-112	3.20
5	5	"Oh, Baby"	Leonard R. Garner Jr.	Cindy Caponera & Mike Langworthy	April 29, 2005	13-04-109	3.15
6	6	"Who's the Parent?"	Gerry Cohen	Frank Lombardi	May 6, 2005	13-04-101	2.95
7	7	"Carriage Ride"	Gail Mancuso	Tom Burkhard	May 13, 2005	13-04-108	2.64
8	8	"The Concert"	Gail Mancuso	Frank Lombardi	Unaired	13-04-107	N/A
9	9	"Josh Works for Riley"	Gerry Cohen	David Regal	Unaired	13-04-102	N/A
10	10	"Riley's Ex"	Gerry Cohen	Josh Etting & Jamie Kennedy	Unaired	13-04-103	N/A
11	11	"School Ties"	Wil Shriner	Maria A. Brown	Unaired	13-04-105	N/A
12	12	"Girl Talk"	Peter Bonerz	Cindy Caponera	Unaired	13-04-104	N/A
13	13	"Plastered"	Peter Bonerz	David Regal	Unaired	13-04-106	N/A

=== Season 2 (2005–06) ===
No. overall	No. in season	Title	Directed by	Written by	Original release date	Prod. code	US viewers (millions)
14	1	"A Year of Living with Fran"	Lee Shallat Chemel	Frank Lombardi & Tim Kelleher	September 16, 2005	13-05-205	3.28
15	2	"Going to the Bar Mitzvah with Fran"	Barnet Kellman	Diane Wilk	September 23, 2005	13-05-201	3.21
16	3	"Sweet Sixteen Again with Fran"	Barnet Kellman	Frank Lombardi & Tim Kelleher	September 30, 2005	13-05-202	2.45
17	4	"Learning with Fran"	Barnet Kellman	David Regal	October 7, 2005	13-05-203	2.68
18	5	"Ahead of the Plan with Fran"	Lee Shallat-Chemel	Allison M. Gibson	October 14, 2005	13-05-204	2.65
19	6	"Going Crazy with Fran"	Bob Koherr	Josh Etting & Mike Langworthy	January 13, 2006	13-05-212	1.95
20	7	"Coupling with Fran"	Ken Whittingham	Mike Langworthy & Diane Wilk	January 20, 2006	13-05-208	1.98
21	8	"Healing with Fran"	Ken Whittingham	Tim Kelleher & Frank Lombardi	January 27, 2006	13-05-209	2.22
22	9	"The Whole Clan with Fran"	Katy Garretson	Yoni Berkovits & Drew Levin	February 3, 2006	13-05-210	2.00
23	10	"Masquerading with Fran"	Mary Lou Belli	Allison M. Gibson & David Regal	February 17, 2006	13-05-207	2.01
24	11	"Going to Bed with Fran"	Mary Lou Belli	David Garrett & Jason Ward	February 24, 2006	13-05-206	2.42
25	12	"Dreaming with Fran"	Bob Koherr	Davis Baldy & David Regal	March 17, 2006	13-05-211	2.10
26	13	"Reuniting with Fran"	Peter Beyt	Bob Myer	March 24, 2006	13-05-213	2.38

== Ratings ==
The premiere episode of Living with Fran airing at 8:30 p.m. on April 8, 2005, drew 3.1 million viewers and a 1.3 rating/5 share in adults 18–49 in preliminary ratings, improving on the ratings of its lead-in What I Like About You, while the followup episode of the show that the same evening at 9:30 p.m. retained approximately 90% of the audience from its lead-in Reba. The series was considered a "solid" performer in its first season according to Variety's Rick Kissell.
