= Becky Wahlstrom =

American actress

- Born: April 25, 1975 (age 51); Chicago, Illinois, US
- Education: London Academy of Music and Dramatic Art; University of Tennessee
- Occupations: Actress, writer, arts educator, therapist
- Years active: 1992–present

Becky Wahlstrom (born April 25, 1975) is an American actress, writer, arts educator, and therapist. She graduated from the Chicago Academy for the Arts high school, the London Academy of Music and Dramatic Art in England, and the University of Tennessee.

Her credits include guest roles in television series Star Trek: Enterprise, Charmed, Mad Men, NCIS and Judging Amy, several theatre productions, including Shakespeare's Twelfth Night and the stage adaptation of Ray Bradbury's novel Fahrenheit 451, as well as a number of minor film roles. However, it was her regular supporting role as Grace Polk on the series Joan of Arcadia, alongside Amber Tamblyn, which has attracted most attention.

Wahlstrom supports, promotes, and stars in regional theatre in the Los Angeles area, and has performed in other cities such as Chicago and Nashville.

In 2017, Wahlstrom joined other actresses who accused director James Toback of sexual harassment, in her case in an ostensible audition in 1998.

Wahlstrom is also a writer and arts educatoras well as earning a diploma in Social Work and Community Development studies at the University of Tennessee. She participated in the 2017 Writers Room Program at the Nashville Repertory Theatre, and won the 2018 Tennessee Arts Commission Award for Playwrights. She also participated in the 2023 Virtual Reading Festival, and works as a therapist at Nashville-based Centerstone, a 501(c)(3) non-profit behavioral health care provider.

In 2024, "A Froggy Becomes" that she wrote premiered at Atwater Village Theatre in Los Angeles.

== Filmography ==
=== Film ===
Year	Title	Role	Notes
1992	Straight Talk	Girl	
1997	The Opposite of Sex	Cashier	
2005	Lucky 13	Toni	
2006	Smash	Ms. Katz	Short Film
2006	Pulse	Jennifer	Short Film
2008	Hindsight	Jennifer	Short Film
2009	Masked	Linda	Short Film
2009	The Strip	Becky	
2018	A Dark Place	Tara	
2019	Brightburn	Erika Connor	

=== Television ===
Year	Title	Role	Notes
1997	Clueless	Grace	"I'm in with the Out Crowd"
1998	C-16: FBI	Michele Olansky	"Hitting Olansky"
1999	Sorority	Chloe	TV Short
2000	The Others	Erin	"1112"
2001–2002	Charmed	Lila	2 episodes
2003–2005	Joan of Arcadia	Grace Polk	44 episodes recurring role (Season 1) series regular (Season 2)
2003	Judging Amy	Summer the Babysitter	"Picture of Perfect"
2003	Star Trek: Enterprise	Vissian Cogenitor	"Cogenitor"
2005	Strong Medicine	Terry Garusto	"The Y Factor"
2006	CSI: Crime Scene Investigation	Suzy's mom	"Loco Motives"
2007	Grey's Anatomy	Lisa	2 episodes
2007	Ghost Whisperer	Stacey Adler	"Double Exposure"
2007	K-Ville	Hayley O'Keefe	"Ride Along"
2008	Bones	Carol Grant	"The Baby in the Bough"
2008	Women's Murder Club	Sandy Foster	"Father's Day"
2009	Saving Grace	Alison Lambert	"Looks Like a Lesbian Attack to Me"
2009	Numb3rs	Wanda Schoemer	"Hangman"
2009	Cold Case	Marci Rich	"Jurisprudence"
2010	24	Ruth Scott	"Day 8: 5:00 p.m.-6:00 p.m."
2010	Mad Men	Doris	"Waldorf Stories"
2011	NCIS	FET Marie Staff Sgt. Catherine Littleton	"Engaged (Part II)"
2015	Nashville	Jill	"How Can I Help You Say Goodbye"
2015	South of Hell	Lucy	2 episodes

=== Video games ===
Year	Title	Role	Notes
2000	Code Blue	Stacey Blum	Voice Role
