= Scout's Honor (2001 film) =

2001 American documentary film

- DVD cover
- Directed by: Tom Shepard
- Written by: Meg Moritz
- Produced by: Tom Shepard
- Starring: Steven Cozza; James Dale; Tim Curran; Dave Rice
- Cinematography: Andrew Black; Tina Di Feliciantonio; Frank Green; Hrafnhildur Gunnarsdóttir; Philippe Roques; Howard Shack
- Edited by: Jim Klein
- Music by: Miriam Cutler
- Production company: Independent Television Service
- Release date: January 25, 2001 (Sundance Film Festival)
- Running time: 57 minutes
- Country: United States
- Language: English

Scout's Honor is a 2001 American documentary film directed by Tom Shepard and written by Meg Moritz. Appearing as themselves in the documentary are Steven Cozza, James Dale, Tim Curran, Dave Rice and Scott and Jeanette Cozza. The film examines the Boy Scouts of Americas (BSA) policy against gays in the organization. It focuses on Steve Cozza and Dave Rice who join to fight against the policy, and also relates the stories of two gay men who were expelled from the organization, and fought back in the courts. The film premiered at the Sundance Film Festival on January 25, 2001, where it won an Audience Award for Best Documentary, and director Tom Shepard won a Freedom of Expression Award. The documentary had additional screenings at several other film festivals where it received multiple awards, and it also received a GLAAD Media Award for Outstanding Documentary. The film aired nationally on the PBS series POV on June 19, 2001.

== Synopsis ==
The film documents the crusade of 12-year-old Steven Cozza and 70-year-old Dave Rice, neither of whom are gay, in their fight against the Boy Scouts of America's discriminatory policy against gays being allowed in the organization. The film also includes two legal challenges to the scout's anti-gay policy by Tim Curran and James Dale, who were both expelled for being gay. During the course of the documentary, it's revealed that Scott Cozza, Steven's dad, is expelled from his position as scoutmaster for speaking out against the scout's anti-gay stance, along with Rice being ousted as well for speaking his mind. Steven eventually quits the scouts and along with Rice, they start their own organization called Scouting for All. At the end of the film, Cozza is 17-years-old and has been invited to be a guest speaker at the Millennium March on Washington.

== Cast ==
Appearing as themselves

- Steven Cozza
- Scott Cozza
- Jeanette Cozza
- James Dale
- Tim Curran
- Dave Rice

== Background and history ==
I have learned there are a lot of ignorant people out there, slowing down the process of change for the betterment of human rights.

— Steven Cozza

In various interviews throughout the years with Cozza, who eventually became a professional road bicycle racer as an adult, said that Robert Espindola, who is gay, was a role model of his growing up, and his commitment for change in the BSA was inspired by Espindola and his dad, a social worker and former AIDS counselor. When he was young, it was his father who acquainted him with various gay issues, and took him to the San Francisco Pride Parade when he was just 3 years old. He disclosed that he had friends who were gay, and weren't allowed in the BSA, but he was allowed, and said "this just isn't fair...so I just decided to take a stand". After achieving the rank of Eagle Scout, he dropped out of the BSA, because his dad had been removed from his position as an assistant scoutmaster for speaking out about the anti-gay policy of the scouts. Cozza said he "didn't feel too welcome after that".

So together with his father and Dave Rice, another scoutmaster who had been ousted from the organization for speaking out in support of Cozza, decided to form their own group and called it Scouting for All (SFA), who accepted members regardless of their sexual orientation. Cozza said that after accepting Shepard's offer to be in the film, and while the documentary was being made, he was still in junior high school, and a lot of his peers would harass him about his fight for the inclusion of gays in the scouts, but when he started getting attention in the media, they changed their attitude and started to respect him. He also revealed that he received death threats during the making of the film, but they only encouraged him to fight that much harder. Cozza also noted his accomplishment of creating the first gay-straight alliance at his school. With all that transpired in regards to his battle against the scouts, he still had kind words for BSA, saying; "scouting taught me to make the world a better place and to treat others as I wanted to be treated". In May 2001, Cozza was featured on the front cover of The Advocate, and gave an interview with the LGBT magazine.

Tom Shepard said he took on the project in 1998 after reading an article in the San Francisco Chronicle about a newly formed organization called SFA, whose primary goal was challenging the anti-gay ban in the BSA. It was in that same article that he read about one of the co-founders of SFA, 12-year-old Cozza from Petaluma, California. Shepard said he went to visit the family to get a better understanding of their motives for getting involved in overturning the ban, especially in light of the fact nobody in the Cozza family was gay. He discovered that Cozza had started this whole thing with a letter to the editor in his local newspaper, and it just naturally continued from there. He found that the Cozza family and SFA were interested in his idea of expanding their press coverage beyond the local media, by producing a documentary that would be nationally broadcast on PBS. Shepard said he spent a lot of time with Cozza before filming even started, and went to all his sporting activities and just hung out with him.

After an agreement was reached with Cozza and his family to appear in the documentary, there was an understanding that the project was going to encompass more than just the one issue of the discriminatory policies of the BSA. The film would also document Cozza growing up on camera and maturing into a young adult. Shepard said that is evidenced by seeing Cozza at 12-years-old in the beginning of the project, and at the end of the film, you see him at 17-years-old at the Millennium March on Washington, where he is an invited guest speaker. He also interviewed Dave Rice, who at 70-years-old supported Cozza and his cause, and helped him establish SFA. Additionally, Shepard featured the legal stories of Tim Curran from Berkeley, California, who was kicked out of the scouts for being gay, and became the first ex-scout to challenge the BSA's ban on gays in 1981, and James Dale, another scout ousted for being gay, who was initially successful in his legal challenge against the BSA, winning a decision in the New Jersey Supreme Court in 1999, but that victory was short-lived when it was overturned by the U.S. Supreme Court.

== Critical reception ==
David Zurawik of The Baltimore Sun said the "most impressive accomplishment" of the film is the complete impartiality in the way Shepard portrays the Boy Scouts as an institution. Zurawik went on to note that even though Shepard reveals the inconsistency and sanctimoniousness between what the scouts claim are their stated values and its anti-gay policy, the film "still celebrates the idea of scouting and the incredible role it plays in [boy's and young men's lives] in the United States". Film Threat praised Shepard for his portrayal of "Steven Cozza as just a normal kid who had the good fortune to be raised by a couple of great parents...it's unfathomable that a young man could take on such a sensitive cause, in a truly insensitive age bracket…and be accepted for it". Donald Liebenson of the Chicago Tribune remarked that the film is not an all out tirade against the Boy Scouts, but instead, it explores "the irony that the values Cozza took from scouting are what inspired him to take his stand".

The Bay Area Reporter wrote that it was a "truly moving documentary", and that Shepard "brings a nice balance to the subject, choosing to focus on the personal impact of the anti-gay policy on the lives who are fighting it". Joe Leydon of Variety said Cozza is impressive as an "unaffectedly decent individual who simply wants to do the right thing" and Rice is sympathetic as well. Leydon mentions that an opposing point of view would have been beneficial, but also notes that the BSA refused to be interviewed for the film. Film critic Julie Salamon wrote in The New York Times that Shepard "abruptly moves from story to story and back again", and while it might be filmed that way deliberately for authenticity, "it also makes the narrative seem disjointed". She said the films high points were the interviews with Rice and Cozza.

== Accolades ==
Festival / Organization	Award	Result	Ref.
The Austin Gay and Lesbian International Film Festival	Best Documentary	Won	
GLAAD Media Award	Outstanding Documentary	Won	
Miami Gay and Lesbian Film Festival	Best Documentary	Won	
National Council on Family Relations	Best Documentary	Won	
New York Lesbian, Gay, Bisexual, & Transgender Film Festival	Best Documentary (Grand Jury Prize)	Won	
San Francisco International Lesbian and Gay Film Festival	Best Documentary	Won	
Sidewalk Film Festival	Best Feature	Won	
Sundance Film Festival	Best Documentary (Audience Award)	Won	
Sundance Film Festival	Freedom of Expression Award (Tom Shepard)	Won	
Sundance Film Festival	Best Documentary (Grand Jury Prize)	Nominated	
Turin International Film Festival	Best Documentary	Won	
USA Film Festival	Non-Fiction	Won	
USA Film Festival	Grand Prize	Won	

== See also ==
- Boy Scouts of America v. Dale
- Boy Scouts of America membership controversies
- Curran v. Mount Diablo Council of the Boy Scouts of America
- Scouting for All
- Societal attitudes toward homosexuality
