= Joan of Arcadia =

American fantasy drama series (2003–2005)

- Genre: Fantasy; Family drama
- Created by: Barbara Hall
- Starring: Joe Mantegna; Mary Steenburgen; Amber Tamblyn; Jason Ritter; Michael Welch; Chris Marquette; Becky Wahlstrom
- Opening theme: "One of Us" by Joan Osborne
- Country of origin: United States
- Original language: English
- No. of seasons: 2
- No. of episodes: 45

Production
- Executive producers: Barbara Hall (2003–2004); Jim Hayman (2003–2004); Peter Schindler (2003–2004); Stephen Nathan (2004–2005)
- Running time: 45 minutes
- Production companies: Barbara Hall Productions; CBS Productions; Sony Pictures Television

Original release
- Network: CBS
- Release: September 26, 2003 – April 22, 2005

Joan of Arcadia is an American fantasy family drama television series telling the story of teenager Joan Girardi (Amber Tamblyn), who sees and speaks with God and performs tasks she is given. The series originally aired on Fridays on CBS for two seasons, from September 26, 2003, to April 22, 2005.

The show was praised by critics and won the Humanitas Prize and the People's Choice Award. It was also nominated for an Emmy Award in its first season for Outstanding Drama Series. The title alludes to Joan of Arc and the show takes place in a fictionalized version of the town Arcadia, Maryland.

== Premise ==
Joan Girardi is a 16-year-old girl living in the town of Arcadia, Maryland. She is the middle child of her family, which includes elder brother Kevin, a former jock who has been left a paraplegic after a car accident, and younger brother Luke, a brainy nerd. Joan's father, Will, is the town's police chief. In the pilot episode, God appears to Joan and reminds her that she promised to do anything he wanted if he let Kevin survive the car crash. He appears to Joan in the form of various people including small children, teenage boys, elderly ladies, transients, or passersby. God asks Joan to perform tasks that often appear trivial or inconsequential—such as enrolling in an AP Chemistry class or building a boat—but always end up improving a larger situation.

These plotlines are interwoven with more realistic matters, such as the relationships within the Girardi family. Various storylines that span multiple episodes deal with the consequences of Kevin's accident, Will's job as a police officer, mother Helen's career as an art teacher, and Luke's aspirations to be a scientist.

=== Characterization of God ===
God is portrayed with a very human personality, and does not appear to favor any particular religion, saying there are "different ways to share the same truth". He quotes Bob Dylan, Emily Dickinson, and the Beatles rather than any scripture or verses. The series examines God from a more metaphysical standpoint than a religious perspective.

God is also depicted as having a sharp sense of humor. In the episode "Touch Move", he tells Joan that he has to send her "down there". When Joan is worried he means Hell, he laughs and clarifies he meant the school basement. In another instance, She appears in the form of a woman exercising and says, "Why do people always try and discern my deeper meanings? This is the kind of thinking that starts wars."

== Cast and characters ==
=== Main cast ===
- Joe Mantegna as Will Girardi, the father of Joan, Kevin, and Luke. He moved his family from their home in Chicago when he was offered the job of Chief of Police in Arcadia, Maryland. Mantegna had a development deal with CBS and liked the script. He was also involved in casting the other characters.
- Mary Steenburgen as Helen Girardi, Will's wife and mother of Kevin, Joan, Luke. An artist, Helen dropped out of art school after being raped by an unknown perpetrator. She works as the secretary at Arcadia High School and becomes the art teacher in "State of Grace". She was raised in the Catholic faith but was never confirmed; after moving to Arcadia, she considers going back to the Church.
- Amber Tamblyn as Joan Girardi, the middle child of the Girardi family who talks to God. He often gives her assignments or tasks that usually have a positive outcome, but she is frequently exasperated by the randomness of the directives and God's refusal to answer direct questions.
- Jason Ritter as Kevin Girardi, the eldest child in the Girardi family. A year and a half before the events of the pilot, he became a paraplegic in a car accident after failing to stop a friend from drunk driving.
- Michael Welch as Luke Girardi, the youngest Girardi child. Luke is a science nerd and straight-A student.
- Chris Marquette as Adam Rove (Recurring Season 1; (Note: Marquette is credited as guest stars throughout season 1, even though he appeared in every episode of the series except the pilot.) Regular Season 2), Joan's best friend and later boyfriend.
- Becky Wahlstrom as Grace Polk (Recurring Season 1; (Note: Wahlstrom is credited as guest stars throughout season 1, even though she appeared in every episode of the series except the pilot.) Regular Season 2), Adam and Joan's best friend and Luke's eventual girlfriend.

=== Recurring cast ===
- Andrew Ableson as Andy Reese, the style editor at the Arcadia Herald.
- David Burke as Father Ken Mallory, Helen's friend and pastor of a nearby church.
- Ivonne Coll as Marlene, Helen's co-worker in the office at Arcadia High.
- Haylie Duff as Stevie Marx, a student at Arcadia High.
- Patrick Fabian as Gavin Price, the unpopular vice principal of Arcadia High School.
- John Getz as District Attorney Gabe Fellowes, a corrupt public servant.
- April Grace as Detective Toni Williams, at the Arcadia Police Department and later at the Hogan County Sheriff's department. Often worked with Will.
- Sprague Grayden as Judith Montgomery, Joan's friend from the Gentle Acres summer psychiatric camp (affectionatly referred to as Crazy Camp).
- Elaine Hendrix as Elaine Lischak, Arcadia High's Advanced Placement science teacher, teaches Joan's AP chemistry and AP physics classes. She has an on-again/off-again relationship with Dana Tuchman.
- Jared Hillman as Brian Beaumont, tightly wound over-achiever student at Arcadia High.
- Aaron Himelstein as Friedman, Arcadia High student and Luke's best friend.
- Kimberly McCullough as Beth Reinhart, Kevin's girlfriend from before the accident.
- Wentworth Miller as Ryan Hunter, a young, charming dot com millionaire who also talks to God, but with his own sinister agenda.
- Derek Morgan as Roy Roebuck, initially Arcadia Fire Department Arson investigator, later Hogan County Undersheriff for Arcadia.
- Morocco Omari as Stephen Chadwick, Arcadia High's principal.
- Erik Palladino as Lieutenant Michael Daghlian, the senior detective of the Arcadia PD under Chief Girardi.
- Sydney Tamiia Poitier as Rebecca Askew, editor and reporter at the Arcadia Herald where Kevin works, dated Kevin.
- Annie Potts as Lieutenant Lucy Preston, the former head of the Hogan County Sheriff's Department's Internal Affairs Division.
- Kevin Rahm as Dana Tuchman, guidance counselor at Arcadia High School. Has an on-again/off-again relationship with Elain Lischak.
- Paul Sand as Rabbi Polanski, Grace's father.
- Riley Smith as Andy Baker, Kevin's friend who's drunk driving put him in that wheelchair.
- Mark Totty as Detective Carlisle, Will Girardi's junk food-addicted partner on the Hogan County Sheriff's Department.
- Mageina Tovah as Glynis Figliola, Luke's friend and onetime girlfriend.
- Misti Traya as Iris, Adam's first girlfriend.
- Constance Zimmer as Sister Lilly Watters, a former nun who helps advise Helen Girardi and dates Kevin.

=== Guest cast ===
- Michael Badalucco as Father Payne
- Hilary Duff as Dylan Samuels
- Alexis Dziena as Bonnie
- Louise Fletcher as Eva Garrison
- Cloris Leachman as Aunt Olive
- Shelley Long as Miss Candy
- Lauren Mayhew as Elle
- Armin Shimerman as Ronald Harbison
- Tyler James Williams as hallway boy

=== Incarnations of God ===
The many incarnations include:

- Juliette Goglia – Little Girl God
- Kathryn Joosten – Old Lady God, or occasionally as Mrs. Landingham God (Note: A reference to the actress's role as Mrs. Landingham on The West Wing. She also frequently visits the book store where Joan works and is a candy striper at the hospital.)
- Russ Tamblyn – Dog Walker God
- Kris Lemche – Cute Guy God
- Jeffrey Licon – Goth Kid God
- Keaton Tyndall and Kylie Tyndall – Twin Girl God
- Zachary Quinto – video assignment God
- Adam Richman (from Man v. Food) – a butcher God
- John Marshall Jones – commonly referred to as Chess Player God
- John Kassir – Mime God
- Robert Clendenin – Linesman God
- Roark Critchlow – Newscaster God
- Wendy Worthington – Mailwoman God
- Phill Lewis – Naval Officer God
- Candice Azzara – Housewife God
- David Doty – Businessman God
- Larry Hankin – Homeless Man God
- Chris Hogan – Sidewalk Vendor God
- Oliver Muirhead – Proctor God
- Alphonso McAuley – DJ God
- Thomas Kopache – Creepy Guy God
- Curtis Armstrong - Security Guard God II
- Lindsay Hollister – Computer/Library Girl God
- Fred Stoller – Pizza Delivery God
- Trevor Einhorn – Mascot God
- Ronnie Warner – Street Guitarist God
- Anastasia Baranova – Exchange Student God
- Brian Klugman – Cashier God
- Louis Mustillo – Garbage Man God
- George D. Wallace – Old Man Walker God
- Joel Murray – Balloon Sculptor God
- Erin Chambers – Majorette God
- Susan Sullivan – Rich Woman God
- John Patrick Amedori – Loner Loser Kid God
- Allyce Beasley – Woman with Cats God
- Rick Overton – Bad Stand-Up Comedian God
- Iqbal Theba – East Indian Sunglasses Salesman God
- Rae Allen – Fortune Teller God
- Christy Carlson Romano – Officious Hall Monitor God
- Mike Starr – Big Tough Guy God
- Sonya Eddy – Female Custodian God
- Veanne Cox – Personable Woman God
- Jack Kehler – Electrician God
- Al Mancini – Grandpa God
- Rolando Molina – Trash Man God
- Adam Wylie – Skinny Kid God
- Mark L. Taylor – Salesman God
- Shelly Cole – Punk Girl God
- Don McManus – Park Ranger God
- Jane Morris – Substitute Teacher God
- James Martin Kelly – Sweeper God
- Michael N. Chinyamurindi – Nigerian Doctor God
- John Del Regno – Locksmith God
- Michael Wyle – French Waiter God
- Cal Gibson – Groundskeeper God
- Todd Sherry – Gay Male Secretary God
- Jordan David – Geek God
- will.i.am – Three Card Monte Guy God

== Theme song ==
The opening credits roll with the Eric Bazilian-written song "One of Us" performed by recording artist Joan Osborne. It was a hit single for Osborne in the United States from her 1995 album Relish:

What if God was one of us?
Just a slob like one of us
Just a stranger on the bus
Trying to make his way home

Osborne re-recorded the song specifically for the show. To fit its lyrics, Joan first meets God as a teenage boy riding to school on the bus with her.

== Production ==
=== Development ===
Joan of Arcadia took shape during Barbara Hall's time as a producer on Chicago Hope in the mid-1990s and evolved while she was an executive producer on CBS drama Judging Amy. Hall said "the concept meshed her fascination with Joan of Arc...her longtime interest in physics and metaphysics, and her desire to use drama and comedy to explore the existence of God in a 'scary, not benign universe.'" Hall added, "I started thinking, what would it look like if God tried to contact a teenager today? I made the decision that God would have to come to a teenage girl visually. Joan of Arc heard voices, but kids today aren't going to hear voices because you'd have to get the iPods off their heads."

When Hall pitched the series to CBS, she and executives agreed they were not looking to make another Touched by an Angel. Among the differences between it and Joan is that Joan is not religious and "the show’s tone is grittier".

CBS greenlit the show in 2002 "when public discourse about spirituality seemed more gentle: post-9/11 prayer services rather than heated debates over 'The Passion of the Christ'". The acquisition was made as part of an effort by the network, which was known for its adult-skewing shows, to appeal to younger viewers. Hall developed the series with Hart Hanson and Jim Hayman, her Judging Amy production associates.

As a guideline for the series' writing staff, Hall wrote a list of "Ten Commandments of Joan of Arcadia", which enumerated what God can and cannot do in the show. These guidelines included points like "God can never identify one religion as being right", "The job of every human being is to fulfill his or her true nature", "God's purpose for talking to Joan, and to everyone, is to get her (us) to recognize the interconnectedness of all things", and "the exact nature of God is a mystery, and the mystery can never be solved."

=== Filming ===
Though Arcadia is in Maryland, the series was mostly filmed at various Los Angeles locations. Establishing shots of Arcadia's skyline and other outdoor scenes were filmed in Wilmington, Delaware. Scenes at the fictional Arcadia High School were filmed at El Segundo High School.

== Episodes ==
Season	Episodes	Originally released	
Season	Episodes	First released	Last released
1	23	September 26, 2003	May 21, 2004
2	22	September 24, 2004	April 22, 2005

=== Season 1 (2003–04) ===
No. overall	No. in season	Title	Directed by	Written by	Original release date	Prod. code	U.S. viewers (millions)
1	1	"Pilot"	Jack Bender & James Hayman	Barbara Hall	September 26, 2003	100	13.47
Sixteen-year-old Joan Girardi is approached by someone claiming to be God. He gives her a mission: get a job. Will Girardi, Joan's dad and new chief of police for Arcadia, is trying to solve the case of a serial killer.
2	2	"The Fire and the Wood"	James Hayman	Hart Hanson	October 3, 2003	101	12.49
Joan enrolls in advanced-placement chemistry, after God asks her to stop being an underachiever; Will ruffles feathers during an arson investigation.
3	3	"Touch Move"	Josh Brand	Barbara Hall	October 10, 2003	102	11.22
God encourages Joan to learn how to play chess; Will must work with a psychic on a missing toddler case; Helen hopes a miracle will enable Kevin to walk again.
4	4	"The Boat"	Kevin Dowling	Randy Anderson	October 17, 2003	103	10.87
Helen fears Joan is becoming eccentric when she enthusiastically tackles her boat-building project; Will encourages Kevin to join a wheelchair basketball team.
5	5	"Just Say No"	Steve Gomer	Tom Garrigus	October 24, 2003	104	10.12
Joan learns from God that she's holding a garage sale on Saturday, which doesn't leave her much time to sort through her family's unwanted belongings. Among the items she unearths are paintings created by Helen during a dark period in her life. Elsewhere, Will goes to bat for a rape victim even though the district attorney feels the case isn't strong enough. Also, Joan catches the interest of a class charmer and a newspaper job falls right into Kevin's lap.
6	6	"Bringeth It On"	David Petrarca	Joy Gregory	October 31, 2003	105	10.64
Joan gets a lesson in popularity when God tells her to try out for the cheerleading squad, and her efforts to impress two pom-pom girls pay off with an invite to hang out together outside of school. Meanwhile, Will's first case working with Det. Toni Williams involves an abandoned newborn left in a trash bin, presumably by a student from Arcadia High. Another story line has a classmate sensing a gay vibe in Luke.
7	7	"Death Be Not Whatever"	Peter Levin	Barbara Hall	November 7, 2003	106	11.33
Joan baby-sits for an 8-year-old boy (David Dorfman) who is obsessed with death; officers assault a black man at a gas station.
8	8	"The Devil Made Me Do It"	James Hayman	Hart Hanson	November 14, 2003	107	11.33
God's mysterious ways once again bewilder Joan, when He asks her to volunteer at the high-school art show, so that she can keep Adam Rove's sculpture from being exhibited. Elsewhere, Will feels pressure from the DA's office to call a man a hero after he shoots and kills a home intruder. Meanwhile, Kevin grows weary of receiving special treatment because he uses a wheelchair.
9	9	"St. Joan"	Martha Mitchell	Randy Anderson	November 21, 2003	108	11.01
God wants Joan to score an "A" on a test about French saint Joan of Arc. As the teen hits the books, she draws comparisons to the life of the young heroine who claimed to hear divine voices and was burnt at the stake. Helen finds her daughter's newest obsession troublesome and urges Will to have the entire family visit a therapist. Meanwhile, Will is unjustly raked over the coals for shutting down a crack house.
10	10	"Drive, He Said"	Ron Lagomarsino	Tom Garrigus	December 5, 2003	109	11.00
Each of the Girardis deal with crises of varying seriousness, the worst of which puts Will at the mercy of a crazed gunman. The day also finds Helen reacting with mixed emotions after getting a positive result on a home-pregnancy test. Meanwhile, Joan dreads having to take her driver's exam, and Luke is presented with a major distraction just before he's supposed to compete in a high-stakes competition.
11	11	"The Uncertainty Principle"	Helen Shaver	Joy Gregory	December 12, 2003	110	10.31
God instructs Joan to ask a troublemaker to the winter formal. Will uncovers secrets that could prove unfavorable to the former Chief of Police and other members of the city's government.
12	12	"Jump"	Timothy Busfield	Hart Hanson	January 9, 2004	111	12.05
Joan is saddened when she learns Rocky (David Dorfman) ("Death Be Not Whatever") has died, causing her to further question God about life and death. Will loses his job when his discovery and public revelation of the town's political corruption causes the city government (including the police department) to be dissolved by the State Governor. Luke continues to work on his science fair project and his growing attraction to Grace, while Kevin is injured in a game of wheelchair basketball.
13	13	"Recreation"	Elodie Keene	Barbara Hall	January 16, 2004	112	11.18
At Helen's insistence, she and Will take a getaway to a spa, but all does not go well when Will cannot forget about his job. And with the parents away, the kids are up to a little recreation of their own; Kevin and his boss, Rebecca, find it hard to ignore their mutual attraction; Joan, as she is trying to sort out her feelings for Adam, is instructed by God to throw a party while her parents are away; Luke helps Joan pull off a successful party.
14	14	"State of Grace"	Steve Gomer	Joshua Ravetch	February 6, 2004	113	12.38
God tells Joan to join the debate team, where her partner is a person who stutters. A new security system is implemented at Arcadia High School. After the art teacher quits, Helen wonders if she would be right for the job. Both Kevin and Luke separately deal with the aftermath of a kiss. And Will and Toni deal with a case involving a reverend accused of child molestation.
15	15	"Night Without Stars"	Kevin Dowling	David Grae	February 13, 2004	115	10.88
Joan's newest mission from God is to work with kids, so she volunteers to help babysit children of abused mothers; Joan becomes jealous when Adam falls for one of the volunteers; Kevin starts to get cocky again and sleeps with his girlfriend, Rebecca; previous events emotionally catch up with Will; and Luke makes a shocking admission to Kevin.
16	16	"Double Dutch"	Alan Myerson	Tom Garrigus	February 20, 2004	116	11.72
God tells Joan to learn to jump rope with a group of inner-city teens, one of whom Joan discovers is homeless. Kevin goes on a date, but not with who you think.
17	17	"No Bad Guy"	James Hayman	Sibyl Gardner	February 27, 2004	114	10.53
A picture of Joan in the locker room in her underwear, taken with a picture phone, is rapidly spread around school. God instructs Joan to join the band. Will must deal with an elderly driver who accidentally killed several people.
18	18	"Requiem for a Third Grade Ashtray"	Kevin Dowling	Joy Gregory	March 12, 2004	117	9.64
God instructs Joan to help out with the a chaotic Girardi household; Adam has his first art show; Will and Toni witness a carjacking. Will and Toni, while making an arrest, get stuck in an elevator with a pregnant woman who is about to give birth; Kevin believes he might be recovering some sensation in his stomach area and gets an EMG (a nerve conduction) test done.
19	19	"Do the Math"	Rob Morrow	Antoinette Stella	April 2, 2004	118	9.50
God tells Joan to take piano lessons; Joan helps her piano teacher deal with her past; Joan learns a painful secret Will and Helen have been keeping from the family; Iris becomes suspicious of Adam and Joan closeness.
20	20	"Anonymous"	Steve Gomer	David Grae	April 30, 2004	119	7.63
Joan joins the yearbook staff, per God's request, and decides to use this assignment as a means of impressing Adam... Feeling threatened that Iris and Adam continue to share a bond over their passion for art, Joan vows to discover a hidden talent that Adam will admire. However, her disastrous attempt to be the yearbook's star photographer soon adds to her insecurities about losing him. Meanwhile, Will and Toni attempt to set up a sting for a man who is planning to hire a hitman to murder his wife.
21	21	"Vanity, Thy Name Is Human"	Jerry Levine	Robert Girardi	May 7, 2004	120	8.17
Joan takes a cosmetics class, per God's request, and Kevin doesn't react well to crossing paths with the last girlfriend he dated before his disabling accident. Glynis' flattering makeover attracts a great deal of positive attention at school, which only adds to Joan's disappointment when Adam fails to notice her own new look. Meanwhile, Kevin, who remains bitter with the belief that he had been dumped by Beth because he had become a paraplegic, harshly rebuffs her efforts to make peace with him.
22	22	"The Gift"	Martha Mitchell	Stephen Nathan	May 14, 2004	121	7.91
After God tells Joan to give Adam a gift, she finds something that leads her to wonder if God's suggesting she have sex with him... While secretly searching through Adam's backpack for gift ideas, Joan is stunned to find a condom there. She soon wonders if sex is the "gift" God had in mind, and she nervously ponders whether or not she'd be ready for such a big step. Meanwhile, Kevin begins covering court proceedings for the paper and ends up causing a stir in one of Will's cases.
23	23	"Silence"	James Hayman	Barbara Hall	May 21, 2004	122	8.46
Upon hearing that Joan may have been suffering from the symptoms of Lyme disease for months, a somewhat relieved Will and Helen believe this news may explain Joan's mood swings and atypical behavior, while a concerned Adam wonders if Joan will be different upon her recovery. Meanwhile, the hospitalized Joan experiences a crisis of faith – and considers revealing to someone close to her that she's been talking to God. In separate circumstances, Helen and Will begin to rethink their belief systems after, respectively, experiencing spiritual dreams and miraculous events.

=== Season 2 (2004–05) ===
No. overall	No. in season	Title	Directed by	Written by	Original release date	Prod. code	U.S. viewers (millions)
24	1	"Only Connect"	James Hayman	Barbara Hall	September 24, 2004	201	8.48
After a summer of therapy and with school resuming Joan tries to return to a "normal" life even as she ignores God, who keeps reappearing; Will is sued for emotional distress by Andy Baker, whose drunk driving caused the accident that paralyzed Kevin; Luke and Grace try to adjust to their relationship.
25	2	"Out of Sight"	Rob Morrow	Stephen Nathan	October 1, 2004	202	8.50
Judith, a wild friend of Joan's from summer camp, starts school at Arcadia High; Will investigates a drive-by shooting; Kevin confronts Andy about the ongoing lawsuit.
26	3	"Back to the Garden"	Kevin Dowling	Joy Gregory	October 8, 2004	203	8.74
God instructs Joan to start a community garden; Judith continues her downward spiral; Luke puts up a strong front with Grace; a former police informant is killed setting Will and Carlisle on a mission to find corrupt cops and Kevin gets let in on the lawsuit.
27	4	"The Cat"	Steve Gomer	David Grae	October 15, 2004	204	9.26
God wants Joan to adopt a stray cat; Aunt Olive gets a stroke which paralyses her from the waist down; Will again starts an internal investigation; Grace finally lets Luke in and Judith gets 'coerced' into a possible date.
28	5	"The Election"	Rob Morrow	Ellie Herman	October 22, 2004	205	7.51
God wants Joan to make a difference in the election; Will has problems with the new head of the police department and asks his son to find dirt, as does Joan to try win the election for the one who fired her from the yearbook club.
29	6	"Wealth of Nations"	Kevin Dowling	Tom Garrigus	October 29, 2004	206	7.19
God wants Joan to get everyone a piece of the pie and get Joan to use her new-found knowledge to make money; Kevin meets an old friend; Grace and Luke meet twice to 'study'; Will wants to countersue the Bakers, and Joan finds out there are things God can't do right.
30	7	"P.O.V."	Graeme Clifford	Lindsay Sturman	November 5, 2004	207	7.86
Joan struggles with the pressures of Junior year; God assigns Joan to work on a videography; Adam and Judith work on a project together; Will, Kevin, and Helen meet with a lawyer to discuss a counter-lawsuit.
31	8	"Friday Night"	Elodie Keene	Stephen Nathan	November 12, 2004	208	9.19
After being prodded by Judith to go on a real date, Joan and Adam nervously prepare for a romantic night at a fancy French restaurant. Little do they know that Judith has subsequently made some misguided plans for herself for that evening, which later causes the guilt-ridden Joan to wonder if she could have prevented her friend's misfortune.
32	9	"No Future"	James Hayman	Barbara Hall	November 19, 2004	209	9.16
As Joan begins to deal with Judith's death, she faces the added pressure of having to relive the day of Kevin's accident during her deposition. Meanwhile, Will feels guilty as he recalls how poorly he treated Kevin in the hours preceding his accident. Additionally, Grace reluctantly agrees to join Luke for dinner at the Girardi's on his birthday.
33	10	"The Book of Questions"	Steve Gomer	Ellie Herman	November 26, 2004	210	8.97
While helping Grace shop for a dress, Joan is delighted to finally meet Grace's seemingly perfect mother, Sarah. However, when Sarah's drinking problem becomes evident, Joan begins to understand why Grace is so private – and why she's long been avoiding having her bat mitzvah. Meanwhile, Luke racks his brain to come up with a meaningful bat mitzvah gift for Grace. Additionally, Adam and Joan have different ways of coping with Judith's death. Will supports Lucy's less-than-legal means of trying to get one of Judith's friends to describe Judith's on-the-run killer, and Kevin's ex-girlfriend is deposed for the trial.
34	11	"Dive"	Martha Mitchell	David Grae	December 10, 2004	211	8.08
As Joan tries to work her way up to the high dive despite her acrophobia, Luke attempts to overcome his paralyzing fear of undertaking an activity at which he might fail. Meanwhile, Will continues his quest to find Judith's killer, and Kevin goes on a date with Beth. Additionally, while reflecting on Judith's death and Kevin's accident, Helen becomes overwhelmed with concern about her family being in harm's way.
35	12	"Game Theory"	Gloria Muzio	Tom Garrigus	January 7, 2005	212	8.35
Despite everyone's protests, Joan allows her snobby, Ivy League-educated guidance counselor to advise her against applying to college. However, after Joan relays her plans to Roger, an engaging college student on the campus she's visiting, he tells her that college is attainable and persuades her to hire him as a tutor. Meanwhile, Adam becomes jealous of Joan's rapport with Roger; Will sees a dark side of Lucy; Helen questions her commitment to Catholicism, and Beth finds it difficult to resume a relationship with Kevin.
36	13	"Queen of the Zombies"	Graeme Clifford	Joy Gregory	January 14, 2005	213	8.68
God instructs Joan to try out for the school play; Adam builds the sets for the play; Grace becomes jealous of Luke and Glynis.
37	14	"The Rise & Fall of Joan Girardi"	Martha Mitchell	Lindsay Sturman	January 28, 2005	214	8.71
After saving a girl's life Joan suddenly becomes famous but she soon learns fame is fleeting and can even turn against you; Adam has a job interview that doesn't quite go the way he wants; tension builds between Lucy and Will; as Luke prepares to get his driver's license Grace tries to educate him on the harmful impact vehicles have on the environment.
38	15	"Romancing the Joan"	Joanna Kerns	Barbara Hall	February 11, 2005	215	7.25
God wants Joan to do an extra credit assignment on Romantic poetry; Adam takes on a perky and cute assistant (special guest star Haylie Duff); Lucy gets a promotion; Helen takes a break from her Catholic studies; Kevin decides to get back into the dating game.
39	16	"Independence Day"	James Hayman	Ellie Herman & Stephen Nathan	February 18, 2005	216	7.31
Incensed that Will and Helen have forbidden her to go to a concert with Adam and stay overnight with him in his father's camper, Joan goes anyway. After Joan has a conversation with God about free will, she decides to use it as a rationale for lying to her mother in order to go on the trip as she's convinced that Helen simply wants her to remain a dependent little girl. Meanwhile, Luke is shocked when the nerdy, girl-obsessed Friedman rebuffs the advances of the surprisingly infatuated Stevie.
40	17	"Shadows and Light"	Kevin Dowling	Tom Garrigus & David Grae	February 25, 2005	217	7.97
Joan is convinced that she's meant to help Stevie keep her part-time job with Adam, despite Stevie's mother's order that she quit. In an effort to supply Stevie with the Social Security number that Stevie's mother is withholding, Joan gets Kevin to use his investigative reporting skills. Kevin's findings end up leading Will to make a discovery that quickly turns Stevie's world upside-down. Meanwhile, Adam is upset with Joan for telling Helen that he tried to have sex with her, and Kevin is conflicted when the local television station asks him to do a report that pertains to paralysis.
41	18	"Secret Service"	Michael Fresco	Story by : Ben Eicher; Teleplay by : Joy Gregory & Lindsay Sturman	March 4, 2005	218	7.90
After Price discovers Joan holding an empty egg carton near his freshly egged car, he wrongly assumes she's the culprit and punishes her with a weekend of community service. Without more direction from God than to rise above the injustice, Joan tries to figure out if she's meant to help a bitter former nun, Lilly, who is overseeing the service project, or one of the social outcasts who are serving as a result of their own offenses. Meanwhile, Joan's also upset that her reluctance to begin a sexual relationship with Adam is driving a wedge between them. Also, Adam meets a troubled artist at the community center; Joan gets Luke a job at the bookstore; Kevin has another car accident.
42	19	"Trial and Error"	Neal Israel	Story by : Matthew Donlan & Jeremy Martin; Teleplay by : Marc Flanagan	April 1, 2005	219	6.94
Joan prepares to prosecute a case for a mock trial at school, per God's request, while enthusiastically planning a way to celebrate her one-year anniversary with Adam, who has secretly betrayed her. Joan surprises everyone with her passion in prosecuting a mock case against the equally motivated defense attorney, Grace. Meanwhile, while trying to hide his guilt from Joan as she plans a special anniversary night out with him, Adam decides to confess his wrongdoing to an appalled Grace. Meanwhile, Will investigates the murder of a girl and Helen continues her study of Catholicism.
43	20	"Spring Cleaning"	Bethany Rooney	Lyla Oliver	April 8, 2005	220	7.30
In the wake of Joan's difficult breakup with Adam, God tells her to do some therapeutic cleaning, which ends up putting her in the middle of a scandal involving her guidance counselor... As part of Joan's clean sweep, she returns everything Adam ever gave her, which only adds to the awkwardness between them. Meanwhile, when Joan returns some items to Mr. Tuchman that he loaned her, a jealous student with feelings for Tuchman vindictively tells the school authorities that Tuchman initiated intimate relationships with both her and Joan. Also, Kevin considers getting a place of his own.
44	21	"Common Thread"	Elodie Keene	Stephen Nathan	April 15, 2005	221	7.23
Before a storm will hit the town. Adam and Joan have a falling out with each other. Adam leaves and heads into the woods to avoid the approaching storm. But when the storm hits, Adam gets lost. When Joan becomes worried that Adam might be in danger. She calls her father and every one searches for Adam while the storm dies down. In the end of the show, Adam is rescued by Ryan Hunter – a young, charming dot com millionaire who also talks to God.
45	22	"Something Wicked This Way Comes"	James Hayman	Barbara Hall	April 22, 2005	222	7.54
God tells Joan that her last two years were just practice for her greatest challenge, which will be to face off against a mysterious man who, though he also talks to God, has a sinister agenda. Initially, Joan is simply curious about Ryan Hunter, the charming, wealthy and influential man who revealed to her that he also speaks to God, and who rescued Adam from the woods during a storm. However, she soon discovers Ryan's dark side and is alarmed that he's insinuated himself into the lives of her loved ones, who are quick to dismiss Joan's qualms about him. He smiles in a very sinister way at Joan before the credits roll, and the series concludes.

== Reception ==
=== Critical reception ===
Joan of Arcadia received widespread acclaim from critics. On review aggregate website Rotten Tomatoes, the first season has a rating of 92% based on 25 critics’ reviews, while Season 2 has a rating of 100% based on five reviews.

Greg Braxton of the Los Angeles Times wrote, "the series is a veritable squeezebox of genres...[including] a family drama, a coming-of-age saga of a teenager, a high school drama and a gritty police show, all tossed together with a mix of fantasy and religion.” Robert Lloyd, also of the LA Times, said "the real miracle here is how deftly the show avoids the soggy cliches of redemption so many of its forerunners have embraced." Rob Owen of the Pittsburgh Post-Gazette called it "the best new broadcast series of the season," and the Associated Press said the show has an "intelligent quirkiness."

James Poniewozik of Time wrote that the series' "marriage of the sacred and the mundane has made Arcadia the rare TV show about spirituality to win over both audiences and critics. Whereas its predecessors have been either panned but popular marshmallow halos (Highway to Heaven) or controversial, swiftly canceled critical darlings (Nothing Sacred), Arcadia has avoided, Goldilocks-style, going too soft or too hard." He added, "by separating God from religion, Arcadia takes away what makes faith divisive—a reasonable goal for a major-network series that needs to draw a broad audience to thrive."

Melanie McFarland of the Seattle Post-Intelligencer wrote, "Only a few episodes into its season, Joan has proved deserving of its growing reputation. It's alive with everything television so desperately lacks: genuine heart, wit devoid of crassness, dramatic situations mirroring so many of our realities that the Girardis sometimes feel more like neighbors than a television family." Nancy Franklin of The New Yorker wrote the show is "both thought through and open-ended, and it should prove especially rewarding for those who think that belief has more to do with asking questions than with getting answers."

Criticism of the series focused on the police procedural plots involving Will Girardi, which many said did not tonally fit with the show. Devin Gordon of Newsweek wrote that the series' cop drama and its fantasy elements felt like "two shows stitched awkwardly together." Tom Shales of The Washington Post wrote "the premiere suggests viewers are being asked to wade heart-deep into a drearily portentous muddle."

Though critics were divided about the show's tone and plot elements, there was across-the-board praise for Amber Tamblyn. Poniewozik wrote, "If God, however, is simply asking Joan to do what all teens have to do—develop an identity—Arcadia works because Tamblyn reminds us so well how tough that job is. Joan may talk to God, but she has to do the work her own, mortal self, from accepting life's unfairness to finding her niche at school...Unlike most prime-time teens, Joan is neither a babe nor a brain, neither a Goody Two-Shoes nor a sarcastic rebel. She's the most extraordinarily average teen to crop up on a TV show in years—yet after a few episodes, you realize you would watch her story even if God stopped showing up." Praise was also given for Mary Steenburgen and Jason Ritter, of the latter of whom Robert Bianco of USA Today wrote, "Indeed, the often painfully realistic treatment of the familial anguish that swirls around Kevin (Ritter), who lost the use of his legs in an auto accident, is one of the show's greatest achievements."

Critics have written retrospectively about the series. In 2015, Margaret Lyons of Vulture wrote, "Somehow Joan of Arcadia is one of vanishingly few shows to bring up two extremely common questions that shape the human condition: 'Is there a God?' and 'Am I a good person?' The answer to both is, it depends whom you ask. And you can only ask so many people in two seasons."

For IndieWire, Alison Willmore wrote, "the show balanced [Joan's] missions with the mistakes a well-meaning but impulsive high school girl might make, allowing the show to also be a very fine portrait of life at a certain age."

=== Nielsen ratings ===
Season		Episodes	Premiere	Season finale	Viewers (in millions)	Rank
1	2003–2004	23	September 26, 2003	May 21, 2004	9.9	#54
2	2004–2005	22	September 24, 2004	April 22, 2005	8.0	#70

Joan of Arcadia debuted on the heels of Touched by an Angel, which ended its nine-year run in April 2003. An estimated 12 million viewers tuned into the series premiere in September 2003. Though Joan was broadcast in the 8 p.m. time slot on Friday nights, a traditionally quiet night for TV, it became a modest hit for CBS and averaged 10.1 million viewers during its first season. The show regularly drew in young adult viewers for its time slot, which led NBC to change the schedule for the competing comedy-drama series Miss Match.

The next year, "viewership sank to eight million, according to Nielsen Media Research," despite continued critical acclaim, including three Emmy nominations. Partly at the network's request, Barbara Hall introduced the character of Ryan, a menacing figure and amoral "tempter" (with The Rolling Stones' "Sympathy for the Devil" as his musical motif) seemingly destined to cause significant conflict for the show's characters.

== Cancellation ==
While Joan of Arcadia was one of the highest-rated new shows of the 2003–04 television season, its ratings declined in the second season and CBS canceled it on May 18, 2005. Fan campaigns ensued to have it reinstated. A promotional campaign by CBS sent street teams into cities to do good deeds, such as buying a cold person a cup of coffee. Only two episodes from the second season, "No Future" and "The Rise and Fall of Joan Girardi", were repeated by CBS, with remaining reruns pulled from the schedule. The cancellation meant the show ended on a cliffhanger, with Ryan potentially facing off against Joan. Ghost Whisperer took over the show's Friday time slot in September 2005.

After the show's cancellation, props such as pieces of Adam's artwork and Joan's signature messenger bag and costume pieces belonging to cast members were sold on eBay.

== Awards and nominations ==
Year	Association	Category / Recipient	Results	Ref.
2003	Online Film & Television Association	Best Actress in a Drama Series / Amber Tamblyn	Nominated	
2003	Online Film & Television Association	Best Supporting Actress in a Drama Series / Mary Steenburgen	Nominated	
2004	America Film Institute Awards	TV Program of the Year / Joan of Arcadia	Won	
2004	ASCAP Film and Television Music Awards	Top TV Series (composer) Jonathan Grossman	Won	
2004	Casting Society of America	Best Casting for TV, Dramatic Pilot (casting director) Vicki Rosenberg for ("Pilot")	Nominated	
2004	Environmental Media Awards	Primetime Television for ("Bringeth It On")	Won	
2004	Gold Derby Awards	Drama Lead Actress / Amber Tamblyn	Won	
2004	Gold Derby Awards	Drama Supporting Actress / Mary Steenburgen	Nominated	
2004	Golden Globes	Best Performance by an Actress in a Television Series — Drama / Amber Tamblyn	Nominated	
2004	Humanitas Prize Awards	60 Minute Category (creator) Barbara Hall for ("Pilot")	Won	
2004	Humanitas Prize Awards	60 Minute Category (director) Joy Gregory for ("The Uncertainty Principle")	Nominated	
2004	Online Film & Television Association	Best Writing in a Drama Series (writer) Randy Anderson (writer) Sibyl Gardner (writer) Tom Garrigus (writer) Robert Girardi (writer) David Grae (writer) Joy Gregory) (writer) Barbara Hall (writer) Hart Hanson (writer) Stephen Nathan (writer) Joshua Ravetch (writer) Antoinette Stella	Nominated	
2004	Online Film & Television Association	Best Actress in a Drama Series / Amber Tamblyn	Won	
2004	Online Film & Television Association	Best Supporting Actress in a Drama Series / Mary Steenburgen	Nominated	
2004	People's Choice Awards	Favorite Television New Dramatic Series / Joan of Arcadia	Won	
2004	Primetime Emmy Awards	Outstanding Drama Series / Joan of Arcadia (producer) Tom Garrigus (executive producer) Barbara Hall (executive producer) James Hayman (co-executive producer) Peter Schindler (co-executive producer) Randy Anderson	Nominated	
2004	Primetime Emmy Awards	Outstanding Lead Actress in a Drama Series / Amber Tamblyn for ("Pilot")	Nominated	
2004	Primetime Emmy Awards	Outstanding Guest Actress in a Drama Series / Louise Fletcher for ("Do the Math")	Nominated	
2004	Satellite Awards	Best Actress in a Series, Drama / Amber Tamblyn	Nominated	
2004	Satellite Awards	Best Actress in a Supporting Role in a Series, Drama / Mary Steenburgen	Won	
2004	Saturn Awards	Best Actress in a Television Series / Amber Tamblyn	Won	
2004	Teen Choice Awards	Choice Breakout TV Show / Joan of Arcadia	Nominated	
2004	Teen Choice Awards	Choice TV Show – Drama/Action-Adventure / Joan of Arcadia	Nominated	
2004	Teen Choice Awards	Choice Breakout TV Star — Male / Jason Ritter	Nominated	
2004	Teen Choice Awards	Choice Breakout TV Star — Female / Amber Tamblyn	Nominated	
2004	Teen Choice Awards	Choice TV Actress — Drama/Action-Adventure / Amber Tamblyn	Nominated	
2004	TCA Awards	Outstanding New Program of the Year / Joan of Arcadia	Nominated	
2004	Young Artist Awards	Best Family Television Series (Comedy or Drama) / Joan or Arcadia	Nominated	
2004	Young Artist Awards	Best Young Adult Performer in a Teenage Role / Amber Tamblyn	Nominated	
2004	Young Artist Awards	Best Performance in a TV Series (Comedy or Drama) — Supporting Young Actor / Michael Welch	Won	
2005	Primetime Emmy Awards	Outstanding Guest Actress in a Drama Series / Cloris Leachman for ("The Cat")	Nominated	
2005	Saturn Awards	Best Actress on a Television / Amber Tamblyn	Nominated	

== Home media ==
CBS Home Entertainment (distributed by Paramount) released both seasons on DVD in Region 1 in 2005 and 2006.

Sony Pictures Home Entertainment released all seasons in Region 2.

On June 6, 2017, CBS Home Entertainment (distributed by Paramount) released Joan of Arcadia: The Complete Series on DVD in Region 1.

Season	DVD cover	Discs	Release date	Ep#	Additional information
1		6	May 10, 2005	23	Deleted Scenes, Audio commentaries by the Filmmakers and Cast; Behind-The-Scenes Featurettes: The Creation of Joan of Arcadia and Joan of Arcadia – A Look at Season One; God Gallery
2		6	November 28, 2006	22	Audio Commentaries on selected episodes A Look at Season 2 featurette The Making of Queen of the Zombies; A Tour of Joan's High School; Common Thread Table Read
Complete Series		12	June 6, 2017	45	

Note: each disc in the season, except the last, contains 4 episodes.

== See also ==
- Eli Stone
- Touched by an Angel
- Promised Land
- Highway to Heaven
- Wonderfalls
- Kevin (Probably) Saves the World
- God Friended Me
