= Man of the Year (1995 film) =

- original poster
- Directed by: Dirk Shafer
- Written by: Dirk Shafer
- Produced by: Matt Keener
- Starring: Dirk Shafer; Vivian Paxton; Claudette Sutherland; Michael Ornstein
- Cinematography: Stephen Timberlake
- Edited by: Barry S. Silver; Ken Solomon
- Music by: Peitor Angell; Barry Stich; Eric Vetro
- Distributed by: Seventh Art Releasing
- Release date: September 15, 1995 (Toronto International Film Festival)
- Running time: 86 minutes
- Country: United States
- Language: English
- Box office: $209,935

Man of the Year is a 1995 mockumentary film written, directed by and starring Dirk Shafer. It is a fictionalized account of Shafer's reign as Playgirl magazine's 1992 "Man of the Year" and his struggle with reconciling his public persona as a sex symbol to women with his identity as a gay man. Shafer combines mock interviews (both with some of the actual people involved and with actors standing in for the actual people) with archive footage from Shafer's appearances on talk shows like Donahue, The Maury Povich Show and The Jerry Springer Show (along with an early appearance on Dance Fever) and recreations of events like his Playgirl photoshoots, his "fantasy date" with a Playgirl reader and the death of his friend Pledge Cartwright (played by actor Bill Brochtrup) of an AIDS-related illness to relate the story.

== Reception ==
On the review aggregator website Rotten Tomatoes, 25% of 16 critics' reviews are positive.

Variety gave Man of the Year a generally favorable review, calling the film "pleasant to watch and intermittently clever." However, it notes that Shafer's writing is "uneven" and that the film's "structure is a bit repetitive." The New Yorker largely concurred, noting that Shafer "keep[s] condescension at bay with some nice comic spins" but finding the use of the death of Shafer's friend as Shafer's catalyst for coming out to be self-serving. The San Francisco Chronicle was far harsher, deriding the film as a "vanity" production and complaining "There's no shape to Man of the Year, no forward movement. Man of the Year doesn't even have the benefit of being hip." The New York Times, however, found the film "gently satirical" with the use of real clips from Shafer's various talk show appearances creating a "tone of vertiginous loopiness." The Times also saw the metaphor in Shafer's experience to the pressure that society put on gay people to pretend to be straight.

== DVD release ==
Man of the Year was released on Region 1 DVD on February 23, 1999.
