= Jonathan Wade-Drahos =

American film and television actor

Jonathan Wade-Drahos is an American film and television actor who is most famous for his lead role as John Webster in Dirk Shafer's 2001 film Circuit. He also played lead role as Gary in Ryan Bottiglieri's 2010 film Trim. Jonathan Drahos lived and worked in the UK where he earned a PhD in Drama with an emphasis in Shakespearean and Marlovian minor epic poetry and performance. He was formerly a Full Professor and the Director of Theatre in the department of English, Theatre, and Foreign Languages at University of North Carolina, Pembroke. In 2025 He won the URTA teaching award in acting. In September 2026 he succeeded Founder Karyl Lynn Burns as the next Producing Artistic Director of Rubicon Theatre Company in Ventura, CA. www.rubicontheatre.org.

== Filmography ==
Films

- 2001: Circuit as John Webster
- 2010: Trim as Gary

TV series

- 2003: American Dreams as an optometrist in episode "Fear Itself"
- 2003: NCIS: Naval Criminal Investigative Service as Lt. Greg Pallini in episode "The Curse"
- 2005: Jake in Progress as Richard in episode "Ubusy?"
