= Scouting for All =

American civil rights organization

- Formation: 1993
- Dissolved: circa 2009
- Legal status: Dissolved
- Purpose: Advocacy/Activism
- President: Howard Menzer
- Main organ: Board of Directors
- Website: Official website (as of April 13, 2019)

Scouting for All was a 501(c)(3) non-profit organization American advocacy organization whose stated purpose was to promote tolerance and diversity within the Boy Scouts of America in the face of its policies requiring members to be heterosexuals who believe in God.

== History ==
Initially founded in 1993 by Scouter Dave Rice and a committee including Mike Cahn, Bob Smith, Ken McPherson and Don Henry, Scouting for All was relatively inactive for its first few years.

In 1997, the effort was galvanized by a letter to the editor written by Steven Cozza, who later went on to earn the rank of Eagle Scout and became a professional bicycle racer. The heterosexual young man criticized the BSA's policies and pointed out potential contradictions between those policies and the organization's own governing Scout Oath and Scout Law. He called upon the organization to reexamine its policies and invited others in the organization who agreed with him to contact him so they could work together to effect the desired policy changes. According to the organization's literature, Dave Rice, Steven Cozza and Steven's father, Scott Cozza were considered the co-founders of the Scouting for All.

The organization appears to have been mostly inactive since around 2009 as evident by the last copyright day on the now offline website and referencing a March 3, 2009 Fox News article as its Latest News.

After David Rice stepped down in the mid 2000s leadership passed through several individuals, until Howard Menzer took the position. The organization has been largely dormant since, with a small group of members but will little action. Other groups replaced it moving from protests to petitions. Such is the case of Scouts For Equality was founded in 2012 by a group of straight Eagle Scouts, including Zach Wahls, a LGBTQ+ activist raised by two lesbian women who later became a Democrat Iowa State Senator from 2019 to 2023. Instead of SFA's strategy of direct protests, SFE lobbied the BSA's corporate partners and used petitions and succeeded in winning inclusion for gay youth in 2013. Scouting For All announced limited protests in the midst of that debate but those did not materialize and their role in the victory was minor if at all. SFE continues to work for inclusion for Gay adults, having merged with the Inclusive Scouting Network to be the lead organization fighting the BSA's ban on gay adults. The ban was lifted in 2013 for Scouts and 2015 for Scout Leaders.

== The Inclusive Scouting Award / Scouting for All Rainbow Knot ==
Rainbow Knot

The Inclusive Scouting Award, also called the Rainbow Knot was distributed by Scouting for All, and expressed solidarity with Scouting For All's cause.

It is not an official BSA patch. It is embroidered on a tan cloth to mimic the BSA's square knot insignia and is intended to be worn above the left pocket of the uniform shirt alongside official BSA knots. It is designed to blend in with the official BSA knots. The square knot incorporates a purple and silver rope used on the BSA religious emblems knot and the other has the Rainbow flag.

The knot was introduced in 2002 by the Inclusive Scouting Network (formerly the Coalitions for Inclusive Scouting) as the Inclusive Scouting Award, and later distributed by the now-defunct ScoutPride and Scouting for All. The knot was later available through the now dissolved Scouts for Equality.

=== Purpose ===
Unlike official BSA knots earned following the completion of specific requirements, the Rainbow knot has no requirements before wearing it. According to Scout for Equality, "you earn it by wearing it" as a form of activism. Per the Scouts for Equality Frequently Asked Questions, as of 2015, 20,000 of these knots had been distributed.

In 2013, BSA lifted the ban on homosexual Scouts, and in 2015 the ban on homosexual leaders. Because of this change, the purpose of the patch has by default changed from a symbol for change of the policy to discretely signaling to others that the wearer is a member of the LGBTQ+ community or a straight ally. Per the Scouts for Equality Frequently Asked Questions, as of 2015, 20,000 of these knots had been distributed. Per the same document, it is used to signal that the person wearing the patch is a "safe" person. This is modeled after the "safe spaces" found in high schools. Scouts for Equality claimed that it allows you to "set a positive example and help to create a friendlier and healthier environment for everyone in the Scouting program".

=== Support and Opposition ===
As stated above, the Inclusive Scouting Award is not an official Boy Scouts of America knot and is therefore not authorized by BSA to be worn on the uniform per the Guide to Awards and Insignia. It has led to debates on online forums with activists and advocates defending their decision to wear it on their uniform as a way to welcome all while others consider it inappropriate in a youth program, exclusionary, and not belonging on the uniform.

These opponents are often called the Uniform Police in a pejorative way implying that they are intolerant or authoritarian by not accepting the practice of wearing unofficial patches. This view seemed to have been shared by Scouting for Equality who considered that wearing the Inclusive Scouting Award "involves risk and requires courage given BSA's currently unpredictable tolerance for dissent."

Scoutinginsignia.com, which tracks all Boy Scouts of America patched and insignias, put this patch on its FAKE or Unofficial "Square knots" page with the following reason why it does not need to be worn: "There is no reason to wear such a square knot insignia -- it does not represent any BSA award, certificate or plaque."

== See also ==
- Scout's Honor
