= Steven Cozza =

American cyclist

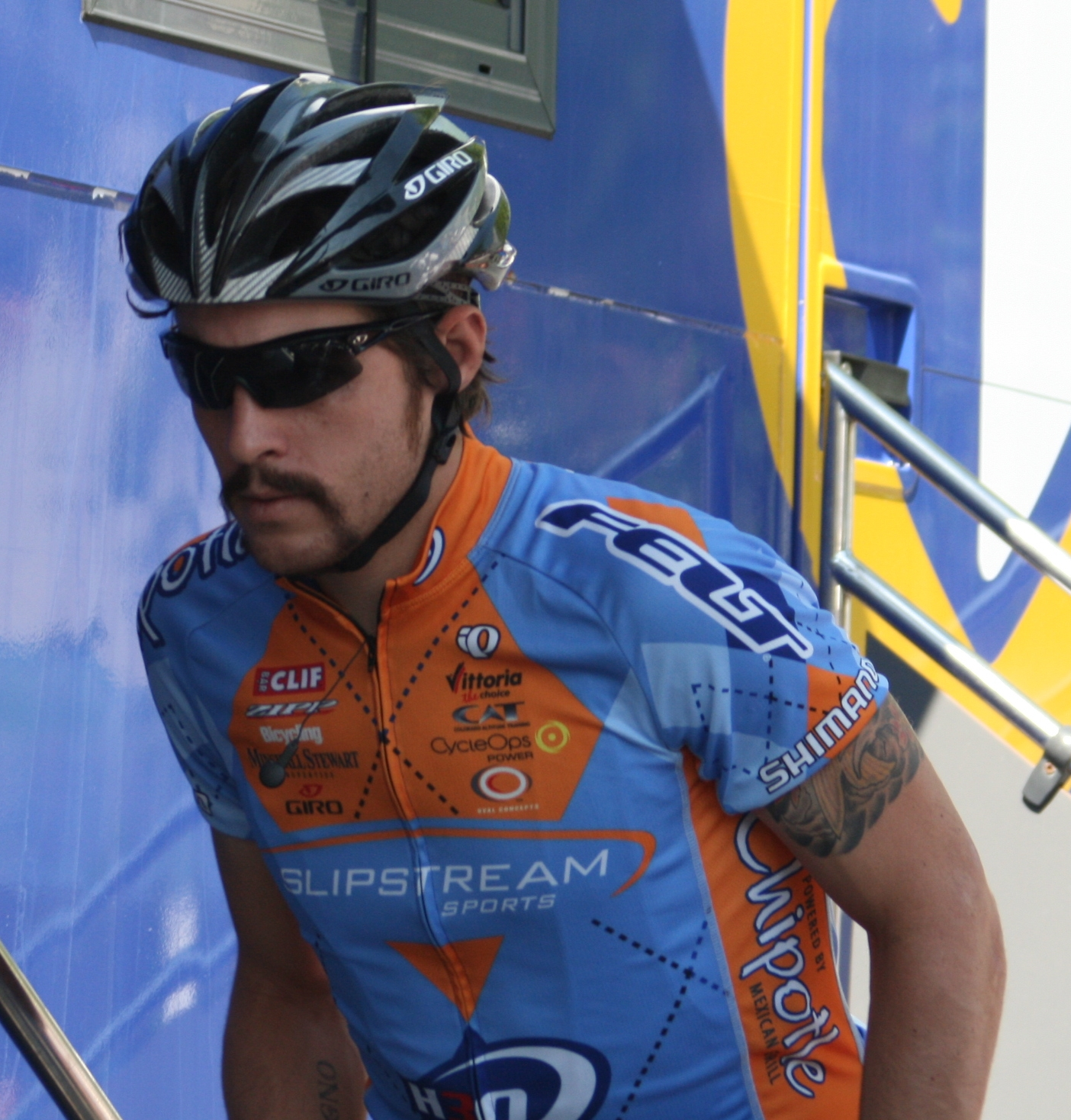

Personal information
- Born: March 3, 1985 (age 41) United States
- Height: 180 cm (5 ft 11 in)
- Weight: 70 kg (154 lb)

Cycling career
- Sport: Cycling
- Discipline: Road
- Role: Rider
- Rider type: Time Trials, Climbing, Stage races, Classics

Amateur teams
- 2006: Yawadoo-Colba-ABM
- 2006: TIAA–CREF

Professional teams
- 2007–2010: Slipstream–Chipotle
- 2011–2012: Team NetApp

Major wins
- 2007 Vuelta a Chichuahua, 1st team overall, 1st stage 6, 2nd stage 2; 2007 Tour of Missouri, 1st best young rider, 1st team overall

Steven Cozza (born March 3, 1985) is a professional road bicycle racer, who last rode for Team NetApp.

Cozza helped his father co-found the Boy Scouts equality advocacy group Scouting for All when he was 12 years old, and was the focus of Scout's Honor, a film that documented his time as a boy scout and his fight against the Boy Scouts of America's discriminatory policy against gays being allowed in the organization.

Cozza broke his left collar bone in his first race of 2010 on stage 2 of the Tour of Qatar, requiring surgery as it was the third time he had broken it. Cozza announced that he would be taking a break from professional cycling in February 2012, in order to fully recover from colitis. As of July 2012 he is a Realtor for Frank Howard Allen in Petaluma, California.

== Palmares ==
=== Amateur ===
2003

- USA Junior National Time Trial Championship, 3rd
- Le Tour De L'Abitibi, 3rd overall, 1st time trial
- Keizer der Juniores, Overall, 3rd
- Grand Prix of The Nations Time Trial (Juniors), 4th
- Trophee Centre Morbihan, Overall, 4th

=== Professional ===
2004

- U.S. National Time Trial Championship, 4th
- Vlaanderens Tweedaagse der Gaverstreek, Time Trial, 3rd
- Tour du Haut Anjou, Time Trial, 1st

2005

- Steve Dunlap Memorial Time Trial, 1st
- Tour De Nez, Stage 1, 1st
- U.S. U-23 National Time Trial Championship, 1st
- Tour De Nez, 6th Overall

2006

- USA Cycling National Festival U-23 Time Trial Championship, 2nd
- USA Cycling National Festival U-23 Road Race Championship, 3rd
- Pescadero Road Race, 4th
- Tour of Utah, Stage 6, 17th

2007

- Driedaagse van West Vlaanderen, 7th overall, 2nd best young rider
- Vuelta a Chihuahua, 1st team overall, 1st stage 6, 2nd stage 2
- Tour of Missouri, 1st best young rider, 1st team overall
- Marin Double Century, 1st and new course record
- USA Pro Time Trial Championships, 16th
- Driedaagse van West Vlaanderen, 7th stage 1

2008

- Tour of Denmark, Stage 5 ITT, 8th
- Vuelta Castilla y Leon, 7th prologue
- Tour of California, 10th, prologue
- Monte Paschi Eroica, 16th
- Vuelta a Castilla y Leon, 19th
- World Road Championships, 23rd
