= James Dale (activist) =

American gay rights activist

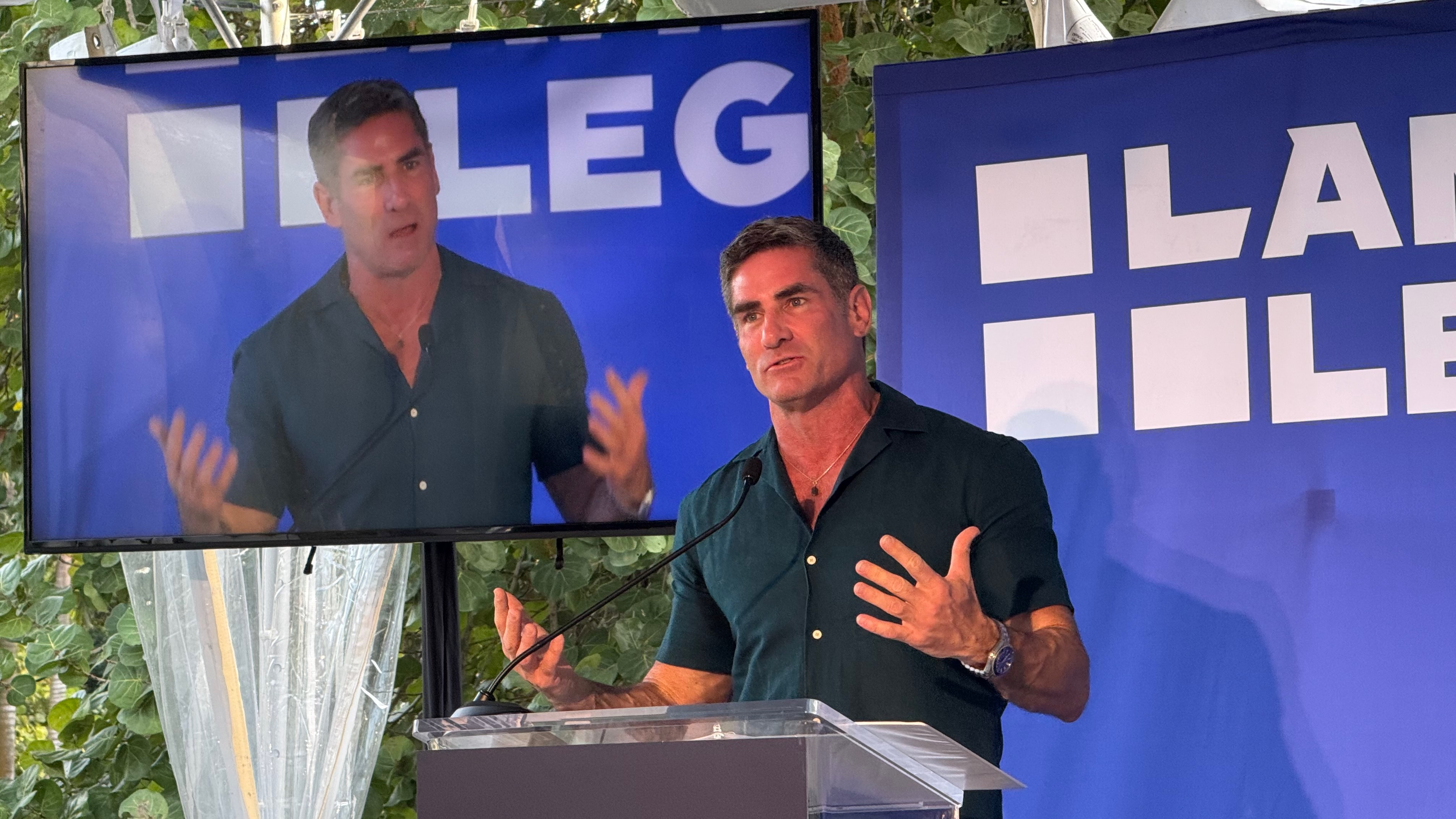
- Dale in 2007
- Born: 1970 (age 55–56); Middletown, New Jersey, United States
- Known for: Plaintiff in Boy Scouts of America v. Dale

James Dale (born 1970) is an American gay rights activist. He is best known for his role in Boy Scouts of America v. Dale, the landmark US Supreme Court case that challenged the Boy Scouts of America (BSA) policy of excluding gay scouts from being scout leaders.

== Before the case ==
James Dale joined the Scouting program at the age of 8 years old, beginning with Pack 242 in Monmouth County, New Jersey. Over the years Dale engaged with a number of different troops and rose through the various levels of Scouting. In Troop 128, he became a protégé of M. Norman Powell, a descendant of Lord Baden-Powell (founder of the international Scouting movement). It was Powell who presented Dale with his Eagle Scout Award in the fall of 1988.

When Dale was a student at Rutgers University, he became co-president of the Lesbian/Gay student alliance. In July 1990, he was a featured speaker at a Rutgers School of Social Work conference on the health needs of lesbian and gay teenagers and was interviewed by the Newark Star Ledger. In the interview, Dale was quoted as stating that he was gay. After the interview appeared, BSA officials expelled Dale, then 19 years old, from his position as assistant Scoutmaster for Troop 73. "The grounds for this membership revocation are the standards for leadership established by the Boy Scouts of America, which specifically forbid membership to homosexuals."

Dale filed suit in the New Jersey Superior Court, alleging that the Boy Scouts had violated the state statute prohibiting discrimination on the basis of sexual orientation in places of public accommodation. In 1995 Superior Court Judge Patrick J. McGann ruled with the BSA, labeling Dale an "active sodomite." In 1998 the Superior Court decision was overturned on appeal.

In a unanimous decision, the Supreme Court of New Jersey sided with Dale, asserting that his expulsion from the BSA violated the law. The Boy Scouts appealed to the Supreme Court of the United States, which granted certiorari.

In 2000, Dale served as the Grand Marshal for the New York City Pride Parade along with Virginia Apuzzo.

== BSA v. Dale ==
Boy Scouts of America et al v. Dale 530 U.S. 640 (2000) was heard by the Supreme Court on April 26, 2000, and the decision was announced on June 28. In a 5–4 decision, the Court sided with the BSA and overturned the New Jersey Supreme Court's decision.

The majority opinion held that the First Amendment right to freedom of "expressive association" allows a private organization like the BSA to exclude members who they feel would express a viewpoint that is contrary to the organization's mission. The Scout Oath and Scout Law set forth central tenets, including that a Scout must be "clean" and "morally straight". The BSA maintained that homosexuality was unclean and immoral, and therefore the presence of an openly gay scout would be contrary to the group's cause.

In their dissenting opinion, the minority held that the ban on gay Scouts did not follow from its founding principles, and Scout Law says nothing on matters of sexuality. They noted that Scout policy discourages Scoutmasters to engage in any discussion of sexual issues, so it should make no difference what that Scoutmaster's sexual orientation might be, and society's longstanding history of prejudice against gay and lesbian people would be aggravated by the "creation of a constitutional shield".

== Post decision ==
In 2001, he appeared in the documentary Scout's Honor and relayed his experience with the scouts and his court case. In 2022, Dale appeared in the Hulu documentary Leave No Trace, directed by Irene Taylor and produced by Ron Howard and Brian Grazer, which examined the Boy Scouts of America's decades-long concealment of sexual abuse cases alongside its simultaneous exclusion of gay members.

In 2012, the BSA reaffirmed their ban on gay people from membership in the organization.

Dale continues to maintain that the BSA policy on gay people is a question of civil rights on which there can be no compromise: "In order for scouting to regain its relevancy and be on the right side of history, there can be no halfway".

Dale published an op-ed in The Washington Post in February 2013, as the BSA debated whether to change its membership standards, arguing that he remained a loyal Scout and that the organization should embrace inclusion.

On May 23, 2013, the BSA's National Council approved a resolution to remove the restriction denying membership to youth on the basis of sexual orientation alone effective January 1, 2014. The ban on gay adult scout leaders remained in effect. On May 21, 2015, BSA National President Robert Gates stated that the "status quo [ban on gay adult leaders] in [the BSA] movement's membership standards cannot be sustained" and that he would no longer seek to revoke the charters of chapters that accept gay adult leaders. On July 27, 2015, the BSA's National Executive Board voted to lift the national ban on openly gay adult leaders, while still permitting religious chartering organizations to set their own standards for local unit leaders. In 2015, the BSA removed its overarching ban on gay people from serving as Scout leaders and employees, but still allowed individual Scout troops chartered by religious organizations to exclude individuals from leadership positions based on sexual orientation.

On February 8, 2025, the Boy Scouts of America officially rebranded as Scouting America, marking the culmination of policy changes over the preceding decade that had progressively opened membership to gay, transgender, and female.

In March 2026, Dale published an opinion piece in TIME Magazine criticizing the Department of War for pressuring Scouting America to roll back its inclusive policies. Dale argued that Secretary Pete Hegseth's threats to withdraw military support unless the organization excludes transgender youth and girls constitute an "authoritarian shakedown." He noted the irony that the "expressive association" precedent established in BSA v. Dale, originally used to exclude him, now protects the organization's right to be inclusive against government interference.

In 2026, Dale published opinion pieces in The Advocate and USA Today discussing his Pentagon litigation and government pressure on Scouting America. In a July letter to The New York Times, he described how his involvement in Queer Nation helped motivate his legal challenge to the Boy Scouts.

In June 2026, Dale filed a Freedom of Information Act lawsuit (Dale v. Department of Defense, No. 26-CV-5367, S.D.N.Y.) seeking disclosure of a memorandum of understanding between the Pentagon and Scouting America executed on or about February 27, 2026. The complaint argued that if the Department of Defense's account of the agreement was accurate, 'the federal government has now obtained by contract what the Court once held it could not command by law.' Dale had submitted a FOIA request on March 24, 2026; the department missed every statutory deadline without invoking any exemption before he filed suit.

Dale’s first Freedom of Information Act lawsuit resulted in the Department of Defense releasing its memorandum of understanding with Scouting America in July 2026, approximately three weeks after he filed the complaint. The six-page document conditions continued Pentagon support on Scouting America making 'substantial progress' on policy changes, with officials from both organizations meeting at least every 90 days, after which the department determines whether to continue its support. The released text did not include several restrictions Secretary of Defense Pete Hegseth had announced, including a bar on transgender members. Scouting America subsequently canceled community spaces for LGBTQ+ scouts, scouts of color, and female scouts at its 2026 National Jamboree; the organization had hosted all three at its 2023 Jamboree.

On August 3, 2026, Dale filed a second FOIA lawsuit against the department in the Southern District of New York, seeking records on how the agreement is being enforced, including Scouting America's compliance submissions and the Pentagon's internal criteria for measuring progress.

Dale later joined the board of Lambda Legal, the LGBTQ+ legal nonprofit that had represented him throughout his decade-long litigation against the BSA.

In July 2026, Dale co-hosted Lambda Legal’s 48th annual Fire Island Pines fundraiser with Todd Sears and Andrew Mitchell-Namdar. The event raised more than $500,000.

Boy Scouts of America v. Dale has remained an active precedent in American constitutional law. In 2023, the U.S. Supreme Court cited it extensively in 303 Creative LLC v. Elenis, 600 U.S. 570 (2023), relying on it as foundational authority for the doctrine of expressive association.

On August 22, 2026, Dale appeared in a benefit reading of Larry Kramer’s The Normal Heart at Whyte Hall in Fire Island Pines. Directed by Leigh Silverman, the reading benefited Broadway for Arts Education and featured Andrew Scott, Andrew Rannells, Francis Jue and Katy Sullivan.
