= Kiersten Warren =

American actress

- Born: Iowa
- Occupation: Actress
- Years active: 1987–2018
- Children: 2, including Misti Traya

Kiersten Warren is an American former actress. Her best known roles include Alex Tabor on Saved by the Bell: The College Years and Nora Huntington on Desperate Housewives.

== Life and career ==
Warren was born in Iowa and raised in Hawaii. She traveled with her parents in her youth, singing with them in Baptist churches. When she was older she lived in Tokyo and made commercials. She moved to Los Angeles in 1990 to seek employment as an actress.

Warren is the mother of actress Misti Traya, who has a daughter. In 2009, she appeared in an episode of Fringe ("Unleashed") as the wife of Charlie Francis, Acevedo's character. In 2003, she appeared in an episode of The West Wing titled "Life on Mars", and in 2009, appeared in an episode of Nip/Tuck titled "Jenny Juggs" as Jenny Juggs.

She has appeared in numerous films, including 13 Going on 30, Intolerable Cruelty, Divine Secrets of the Ya-Ya Sisterhood, Bicentennial Man and Independence Day.

== Filmography ==
=== Film ===
Year	Title	Role	Notes
1996	Independence Day	Tiffany	
1997	Painted Hero	Teresa	
1999	Pushing Tin	Karen	
1999	Liberty Heights	Annie	
1999	Bicentennial Man	Galatea	
2000	Duets	Candy Woods	
2001	Circuit	Nina	
2002	Divine Secrets of the Ya-Ya Sisterhood	Younger Necie Kelleher	
2003	Black Cadillac	Jeannine	
2003	Intolerable Cruelty	Claire O'Mara	
2003	The Snow Walker	Estelle	
2004	13 Going on 30	Trish Sackett	
2006	Hoot	Mrs. Eberhardt	
2006	Bring It On: All or Nothing	Pamela "Pam" Allen	Video
2006	The Astronaut Farmer	Phyllis	
2008	Christmas Cottage	Tanya	
2009	Charades	Nikki	Short film
2012	Silent but Deadly	Rachel	
2016	The Thinning	Barbara Michaels	
2016	An Inherited Life	Penny	
2017	The Invisible Mother	Coco	

=== Television ===
Year	Title	Role	Notes
1987	Magnum, P.I.	Sugar	Episode: "The Aunt Who Came to Dinner"
1990	Walt Disney's Wonderful World of Color	Diana	Episode: "Exile"
1990	Hurricane Sam	Trisha Kelvin	Television film
1990	Silhouette	Sandra Kimball	Television film
1991	False Arrest	Eden	Television film
1992	Fugitive Among Us	Sherry Nash	Television film
1992	Grave Secrets: The Legacy of Hilltop Drive	Tina Williams	Television film
1992	Hearts Afire	Tammy	"First Time"
1992–1993	Life Goes On	Goodman	Recurring role
1993–1994	Saved by the Bell: The College Years	Alex Tabor	Main role
1994	Saved by the Bell: Wedding in Las Vegas	Alex Tabor	Television film
1995	Cybill	Kathy	"Mourning Has Broken"
1997	JAG	Princess Alexandra of Romania	"Washington Holiday"
1997	Night Man	Bonnie Parker	"That Ol' Gang of Mine"
1998	Maximum Bob	Leanne Lancaster	Main role
1998	Fantasy Island	Jeanette	"We're Not Worthy"
2001	Thieves	Teri	"Dey Got De Degas"
2001	Wolf Lake	Nancy	"Tastes Like Chicken"
2003	A Painted House	Stacy Dale	Television film
2003	The West Wing	Blair Spoonhour	"Life on Mars"
2004	Paradise	Grace Paradise	Television film
2006, 2012	Desperate Housewives	Nora Huntington	Recurring role; 9 episodes (recurring season 3, guest season 2 and 8)
2007	Dirty Sexy Money	Ellen Darling	"Pilot"
2007–2009	Slacker Cats	Tabitha (voice)	"Mexico", "Casino Miaow", "Work, Work, Work"
2008	Dirt	Martina Linn	"Welcome to Normal"
2009	Fringe	Sonia	"Unleashed"
2009	Acceptance	Grace	Television film
2009	Nip/Tuck	Jenny Juggs	"Jenny Juggs"
2011	Beyond the Blackboard	Danny's Mom	Television film
2011	CSI: Miami	Darla Chambers	"Crowned"
2012	Workaholics	Gayle Reynolds	"The Business Trip"
2012–2013	Bunheads	Claire Thompson	"Inherit the Wind", "What's Your Damage, Heather?", "The Astronaut and the Ballerina"
2013	CSI: Crime Scene Investigation	Monica Downs	"Ghosts of the Past"
2015	The Mentalist	Kelis Weir	"Brown Shag Carpet"
2015	Girl Missing	Sylvia	TV film
2018	Dirty John	Britt	"Red Flags and Parades"
