= Boy Scouts of America v. Dale =

Boy Scouts of America et al. v. Dale
- Supreme Court of the United States

Argued April 26, 2000 Decided June 28, 2000
- Full case name: Boy Scouts of America and Monmouth Council, et al., Petitioners v. James Dale
- Citations: 530 U.S. 640 (more) 120 S. Ct. 2446, 147 L. Ed. 2d 554, 2000 U.S. LEXIS 4487

Case history
- Prior: 160 N.J. 562, 734 A.2d 1196, reversed and remanded

Holding
- A private organization is allowed, under certain criteria, to exclude a person from membership through their First Amendment right to freedom of association in spite of state antidiscrimination laws. New Jersey Supreme Court reversed.

Court membership
- Chief Justice William Rehnquist Associate Justices John P. Stevens · Sandra Day O'Connor; Antonin Scalia · Anthony Kennedy; David Souter · Clarence Thomas; Ruth Bader Ginsburg · Stephen Breyer

Case opinions
- Majority: Rehnquist, joined by O'Connor, Scalia, Kennedy, Thomas
- Dissent: Stevens, joined by Souter, Ginsburg, Breyer
- Dissent: Souter, joined by Ginsburg, Breyer

Laws applied
- U.S. Const. amend. I

Boy Scouts of America et al. v. Dale, 530 U.S. 640 (2000), is a landmark decision of the U.S. Supreme Court, decided on June 28, 2000, which held that the constitutional right to freedom of association allowed the Boy Scouts of America (BSA) to exclude a homosexual person from membership in spite of a state law requiring equal treatment of homosexuals in public accommodations. More generally, the court ruled that a private organization such as the BSA may exclude a person from membership when "the presence of that person affects in a significant way the group's ability to advocate public or private viewpoints". In a 5–4 decision, the Supreme Court ruled that opposition to homosexuality is part of BSA's "expressive message" and that allowing homosexuals as adult leaders would interfere with that message.

The ruling reversed a decision of the New Jersey Supreme Court that had determined that New Jersey's public accommodations law required the BSA to readmit assistant Scoutmaster James Dale, who had come out and whom the BSA had expelled from the organization for that reason. Subsequently, the BSA lifted its bans on gay scouts and gay leaders in 2013 and 2015, respectively.

== Background ==
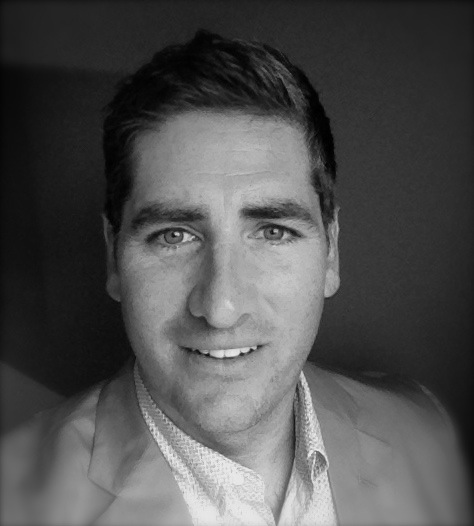
Scoutmaster James Dale

The Boy Scouts of America is a private, non-profit organization engaged in instilling its system of values in young people. At the time of the case, it asserted that homosexuality was inconsistent with those values.

When Dale was a student at Rutgers University, he became co-president of the Lesbian/Gay student alliance. In July 1990, he attended a seminar on the health needs of lesbian and gay teenagers, where he was interviewed. An account of the interview was published in a local newspaper in which Dale was quoted as saying he was gay. BSA officials read the interview and expelled Dale from his position as assistant Scoutmaster of a New Jersey troop. Dale, an Eagle Scout, filed suit in the New Jersey Superior Court, alleging, among other things, that the Boy Scouts had violated the state statute prohibiting discrimination on the basis of sexual orientation in places of public accommodation. The New Jersey Supreme Court ruled against the Boy Scouts, saying that they violated the State's public accommodations law by revoking Dale's membership based on his homosexuality. Among other rulings, the court (1) held that application of that law did not violate the Boy Scouts' First Amendment right of expressive association because Dale's inclusion would not significantly affect members' ability to carry out their purposes; (2) determined that New Jersey has a compelling interest in eliminating the destructive consequences of discrimination from society, and that its public accommodations law abridges no more speech than is necessary to accomplish its purpose; and (3) held that Dale's reinstatement did not compel the Boy Scouts to express any message.

The Boy Scouts appealed to the United States Supreme Court, which granted certiorari to determine whether the application of New Jersey's public accommodations law violated the First Amendment.

== Counsel ==
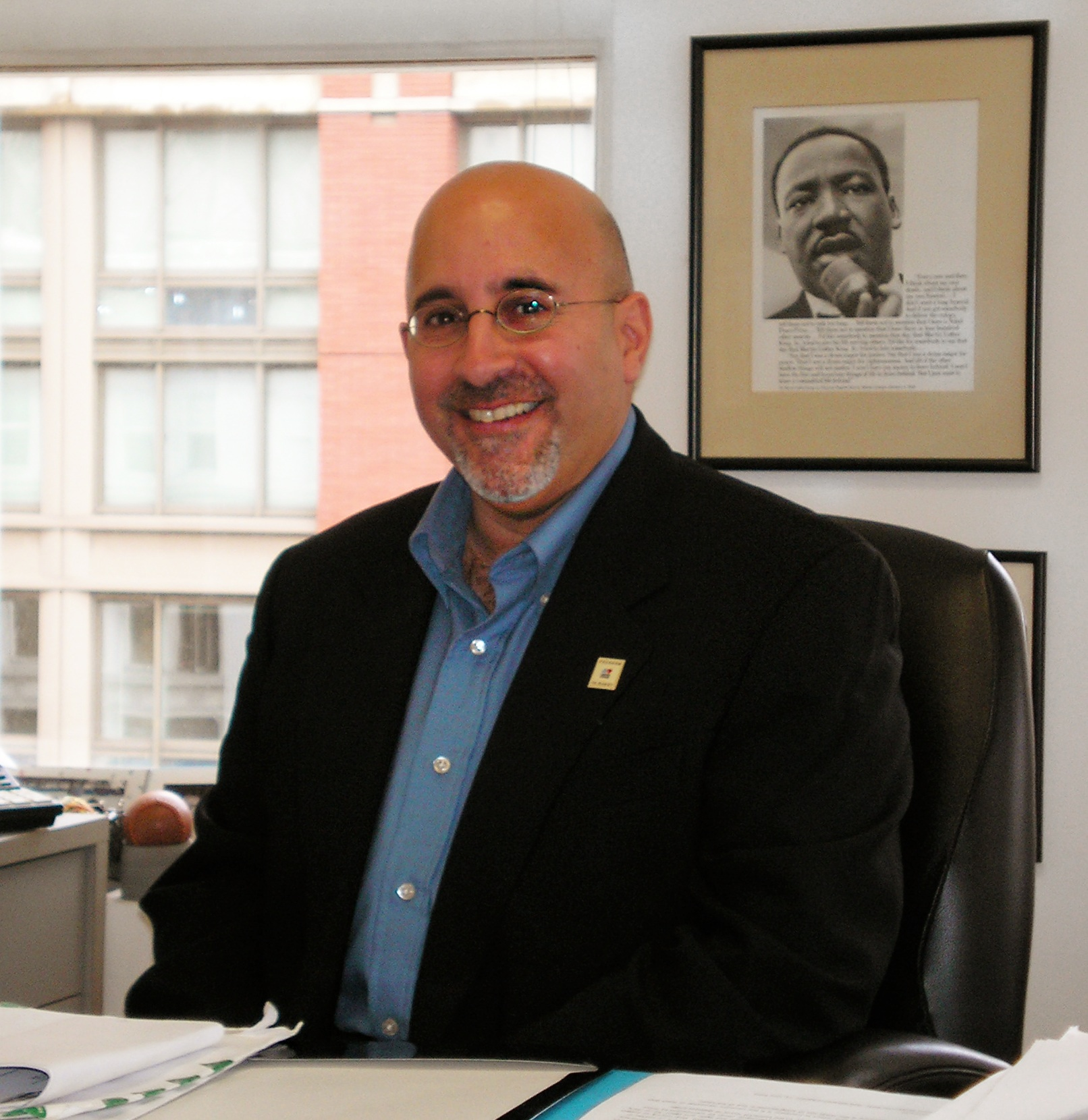
Evan Wolfson, attorney for James Dale

Dale was represented by Evan Wolfson, an attorney and noted LGBT rights advocate. Wolfson has also worked on a number of high-profile cases seeking legal recognition of same-sex marriages. Also representing Dale on a pro bono basis was the New York-based law firm Cleary Gottlieb Steen & Hamilton.

The Boy Scouts of America were represented by attorney George Davidson, a partner in the New York-based law firm Hughes Hubbard & Reed. Davidson is a former president of the Legal Aid Society and chair of the Federal Defenders of New York.

== Decision ==
The Supreme Court decided 5–4 for the BSA on June 28, 2000.

=== Majority opinion ===
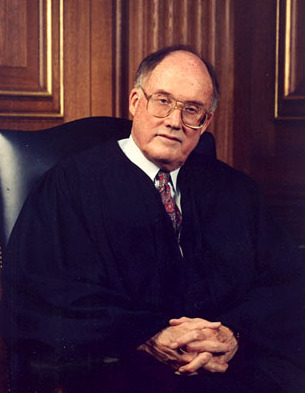
Chief Justice William Rehnquist

Chief Justice William Rehnquist's majority opinion held that expressive associations are protected from being forced to transmit messages contrary to their beliefs, and that the state public accommodations law may not be applied to burden the Boy Scouts' associational right.

The Court begins its analysis by affirming a fundamental principle: the right to expressive association is an essential component of the First Amendment. This right allows individuals to join together to pursue a broad range of goals—political, social, religious, and cultural. Its purpose is to promote cultural diversity and protect dissident expression from being silenced. However, it is not an absolute freedom, and there have been tensions with public accommodations laws as the concept of a "public accommodation" has been stretched from commercial businesses to private membership organizations. The Supreme Court has acknowledged that states have a compelling interest in eradicating discrimination, and performs a balancing test in expressive association cases: it weighs the organization's expressive associational interest against the state's interest, examining whether the law's application imposes a serious burden on the group's freedom of expression. The Court ruled that application of public accommodations law to force the Boy Scouts to accept Dale as a scoutmaster would unconstitutionally burden the Boy Scouts' associational right.

To determine whether a group is protected by the First Amendment's expressive associational right, it must first be determined whether the group engages in "expressive association." After a de novo review of the factual record, including the Scout Oath and Scout Law, the court decided that the general mission of the Boy Scouts was clear—"to instill values in young people"—an expressive activity protected by the First Amendment. The Court firmly rejected the New Jersey Supreme Court's finding that the Boy Scouts' expressive message would remain unharmed. The state court had reasoned that opposing homosexuality was not the group's primary purpose, that it discouraged leaders from discussing sexual topics, and that it included members with diverse views. The Supreme Court found this analysis legally flawed.

First, an expressive association is protected from being forced to convey a message contrary to its beliefs, even if advocating views about homosexuality is not the association's central purpose.

The Court afforded significant deference to the Boy Scouts’ own assertions about:

1. The nature of its expression: The Boy Scouts asserted that it "teach[es] that homosexual conduct is not morally straight", and that it does "not want to promote homosexual conduct as a legitimate form of behavior".
2. What would impair that expression: The Boy Scouts asserted that an openly gay scoutmaster would “force the organization to send a message” undermining its expressive activity.

Second, even assuming the Boy Scouts prefers its leaders to avoid explicit discussions on sexuality, the First Amendment protects the organization's chosen method of expression. If the Boy Scouts aims to instill its values through example and conduct rather than verbal instruction on sexual topics, this pedagogical choice does not undermine the sincerity or constitutional significance of its underlying belief. The manner in which a group conveys its message is itself shielded by the First Amendment.

Third, while the policy may not represent the views of all Boy Scouts, the First Amendment "does not require that every member of a group agree on every issue in order for the group's policy to be expressive association." The Boy Scouts has a First Amendment right to control its public message by deciding that the visible presence of an openly gay activist in a leadership role would express a message of acceptance it does not wish to convey, while the presence of a heterosexual leader who disagrees with this message would not.

The decision concluded:

We are not, as we must not be, guided by our views of whether the Boy Scouts' teachings with respect to homosexual conduct are right or wrong; public or judicial disapproval of a tenet of an organization's expression does not justify the State's effort to compel the organization to accept members where such acceptance would derogate from the organization's expressive message. While the law is free to promote all sorts of conduct in place of harmful behavior, it is not free to interfere with speech for no better reason than promoting an approved message or discouraging a disfavored one, however enlightened either purpose may strike the government.

=== Dissenting opinion ===
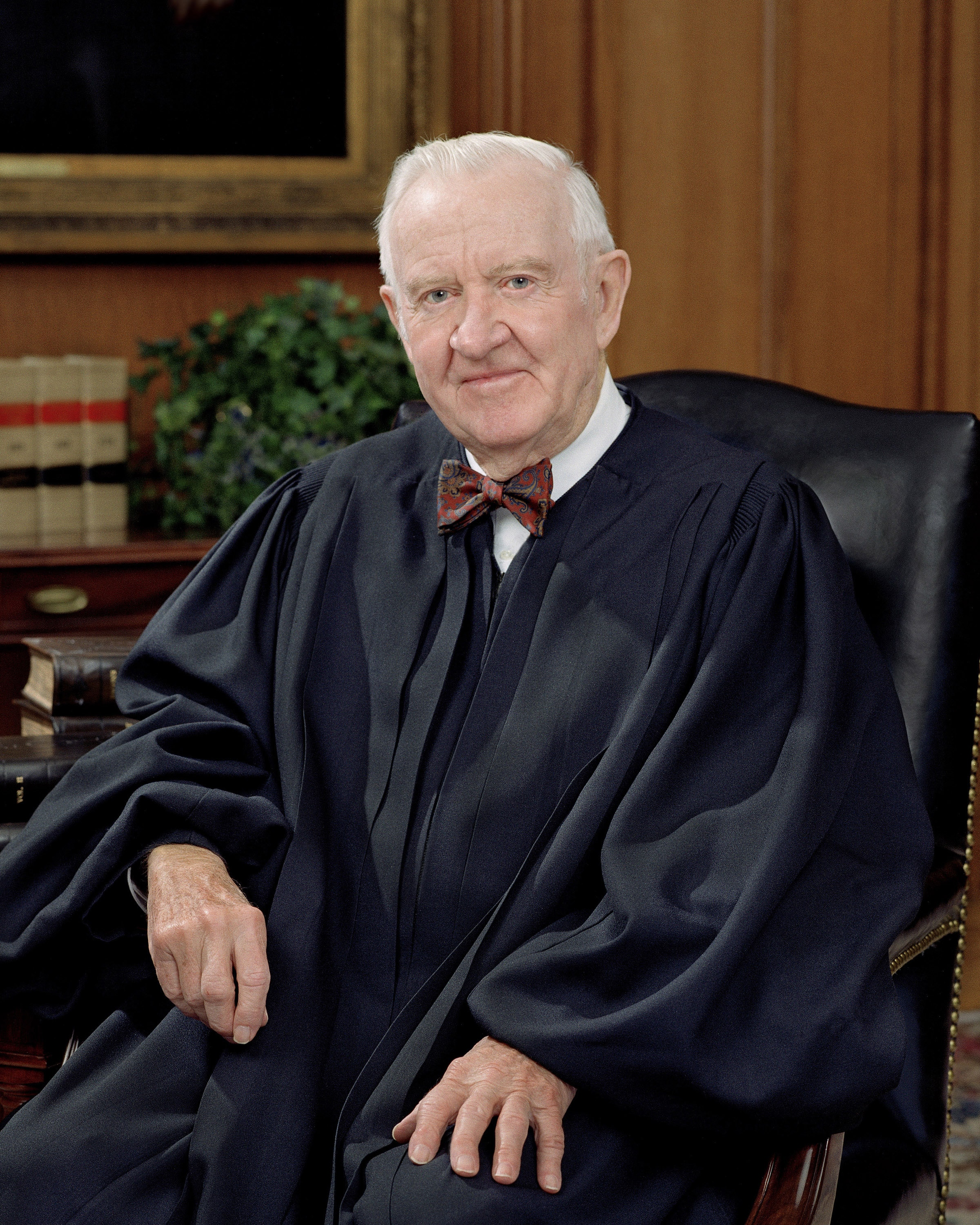
Justice John Paul Stevens

Justice Stevens wrote a dissent in which Justices Souter, Ginsburg, and Breyer joined. He observed that "every state law prohibiting discrimination is designed to replace prejudice with principle." Justice Brandeis had observed in his dissent from New State Ice Company v. Liebmann (1932) that it "is one of the happy incidents of the federal system that a single courageous State may, if its citizens choose, serve as a laboratory; and try novel social and economic experiments without risk to the rest of the country". In Stevens' opinion, the Court's decision interfered with New Jersey's experiment.

Stevens' first point was that the Boy Scouts' ban on gay members did not follow from its founding principles. The Boy Scouts sought to instill "values" in young people, "to prepare them to make ethical choices over their lifetime in achieving their full potential". The Scout Oath and the Scout Law, which set forth the Scouts' central tenets, assist in this goal. One of these tenets is that a Scout is "morally straight". Another is that a Scout is "clean". As these terms were defined in the Scout Handbook, Stevens said, "it is plain as the light of day that neither one of these principles—'morally straight' and 'clean'—says the slightest thing about homosexuality. Indeed, neither term in the Boy Scouts' Law and Oath expresses any position whatsoever on sexual matters."

What guidance the Boy Scouts gave to the adult leaders that have direct contact with the Scouts themselves urged those leaders to avoid discussing sexual matters. "Scouts... are directed to receive their sex education at home or in school, but not from the organization." Scoutmasters, in turn, are told to direct "curious adolescents" to their family, religious leaders, doctors, or other professionals. The Boy Scouts had gone so far as to devise specific guidelines for Scoutmasters:

1. Do not advise Scouts about sexual matters, because it is outside the expertise and comfort level of most Scoutmasters.
2. If a Scout brings specific questions to his Scoutmaster, the Scoutmaster should answer within his comfort level, remembering that a "boy who appears to be asking about sexual intercourse... may really only be worried about pimples".
3. Boys with "sexual problems" should be referred to an appropriate professional.

Stevens ended his dissent by noting that serious and "ancient" prejudices facing homosexuals could be aggravated by the "creation of a constitutional shield".

== Reaction ==
Constitutional law professor Laurence Tribe commented that all antidiscrimination laws intentionally suppress expression to some degree:

[W]hen the state decides to prohibit refusals to associate based on a given characteristic ... [,] it is rarely, if ever, enacting a 'neutral' rule. ... Rather, ... the state is making an intrinsically contestable statement about the rightness or wrongness of using the characteristic in question as a criterion for association.

== See also ==
- List of LGBT-related cases in the United States Supreme Court
