= Misti Traya =

American actress

- Born: Honolulu, Hawaii, U.S.
- Occupation: Actress
- Years active: 2004–2008
- Children: 2
- Mother: Kiersten Warren
- Relatives: Kirk Acevedo (stepfather)

Misti Traya is a former American actress. She landed her first prime time television series regular role playing 15-year-old Allison Reeves in The WB's comedy Living with Fran. She is the daughter of actress Kiersten Warren.

== Life and career ==
Traya was born in Honolulu, Hawaii. She worked behind-the-scenes on the independent film, Havoc, in which she received an on-camera role. Within weeks of her first actual audition, she landed recurring roles on Joan of Arcadia and Huff.

Traya completed two feature films, Dying for Dolly, a Lion's Gate film directed by Ron Underwood, starring Chazz Palminteri and Usher, as well as Material Girls, produced by Maverick Films, directed by Martha Coolidge, and starring Hilary Duff and Haylie Duff.

Traya also starred in VH1's I Love the New Millennium.

== Personal life ==
Traya is married and has two daughters Lily (b. 2011) and Edith (b. 2020). She currently resides in England.

== Filmography ==
Television and film roles
Year	Title	Role	Notes
2004	Joan of Arcadia	Iris	6 episodes
2004–2005	Huff	Gail	5 episodes
2005–2006	Living with Fran	Alison Reeves	Main role, 26 episodes
2005	In the Mix	Maya	Film
2006	I Love Toys	Herself	TV series documentary
2006	Material Girls	Martinique	Film
2006	Nip/Tuck	Mallory Budge	1 episode
2007	How I Met Your Mother	Molly	1 episode
2007	Law & Order: Special Victims Unit	Cassandra Sullivan	Episode: "Pretend" (season 8, episode 21)
2007	Getting Away with Murder	Lily/The Spook	3 episodes
2007	War Eagle, Arkansas	Abby	Film
2008	I Love the New Millennium	Herself	TV miniseries
2008	Libertyville	Tiffany	TV movie
2008	Army Wives	Jessica	1 episode
