= Brian Lane Green =

American actor

- Born: March 9, 1962 (age 64); Columbus, Indiana, U.S.
- Occupation: Actor

Brian Lane Green (born March 9, 1962) is an American stage and television actor. He is known for his stage roles throughout the country like as the title character in Joseph and the Amazing Technicolor Dreamcoat. He received a Tony Award nomination for his performance in the 1989 Broadway production of Starmites. He also appeared as JoJo in The Life on Broadway.

== Biography ==
Green was born in Columbus, Indiana and grew up in Cleveland, Tennessee, where he began singing in church. He won the Church of God national Teen Talent competition. After starring in a local production of Pippin, he began working as an actor, guest starring on television shows including Highway to Heaven, Hotel, Matlock, and Murder, She Wrote; and appearing as a regular on the soap operas Days of Our Lives, Another World, and All My Children. In 1986, he made his Broadway debut in the role of Huck Finn in Big River. He appears in the 2001 gay-related film Circuit.

Green collaborated with Billy Stritch and Johnny Rodgers to write, I Would Never Leave You for Liza Minnelli. The song appeared in Liza's at The Palace.... on Broadway and is on the album of the recording of the show which was produced by Phil Ramone. Most recently, Green appeared in The Broadway Tenors concerts. He serves on the Artistic Advisory Board of Gulfshore Playhouse, Southwest Florida's premier professional theater.

== Filmography ==
Television and Film
| Year | Title | Role | Notes |
|---|---|---|---|
| 1980 | Breaking Away | Jerry | (TV Series), 1 episode: "King of the Quarry" |
| 1983 | AfterMASH | Dypsinski (credited as Brian Greene) | (TV Series), 2 episodes: "Klinger vs. Klinger" and "Shall We Dance" |
| 1985 | Highway to Heaven | Gary Duncan (credited as Brian L. Green) | (TV Series), 2 episodes: "A Song for Jason: Part 1" and "A Song for Jason: Part 2" |
| 1986 | Murder, She Wrote | Matthew Burns (credited as Brian L. Green) | (TV Series), 1 episode: "Powder Keg" |
| 1986 | Hotel | Michael Watson (credited as Brian L. Green) | (TV Series), 1 episode: "Child's Play" |
| 1986-1990 | Matlock | Kevin Meredith (credited as Brian L. Green) | (TV Series), 2 episodes: "The Judge" and "The Kidnapper" |
| 1987-1988 | Days of Our Lives | Alan Brand (credited as Brian Green) | (TV Series), 34 episodes |
| 1988 | The Law & Harry McGraw | Derek Fosby | (TV Series), 1 episode: "Harry Does the Hustle" |
| 1989 | Just the Ten of Us | Cort (credited as Brian L. Green) | (TV Series), 1 episode: "Betrayal" |
| 1989 | Nearly Departed | Kirk (credited as Brian L. Green) | (TV Series), 1 episode: "Altared States" |
| 1990-1991 | Broken Badges | Unnamed role (credited as Brian L. Green) | (TV Series), 2 episodes: "Chucky" and "Meet Your Matchmaker" |
| 1991-1993 | Another World | Sam Fowler (credited as Brian Green) | (TV Series), 42 episodes |
| 1993 | All My Children | Brian Bodine No. 3 | (TV Series), 34 episodes |
| 1997 | Sabrina the Teenage Witch | Benvolio (credited as Brian Green) | (TV Series), 1 episode: "The Great Mistake" |
| 2001 | Circuit | Gill | (Film) |
| 2001 | Friends & Family | Damon Jennings | (Film) |

== Personal life ==
In 2003, Green came out as gay in Out magazine.
