= Dirk Shafer =

American film director

- Born: November 7, 1962; Carbondale, Illinois, U.S.
- Died: March 5, 2015 (aged 52); Los Angeles, California
- Occupations: Model; Actor; Screenwriter; Director
- Known for: Playgirl 1992 Man of the Year
- Height: 5 ft 10 1/2 in (1.791 m)

Dirk Alan Shafer (November 7, 1962 – March 5, 2015) was an American model, actor, screenwriter and director. Born in Carbondale, Illinois, he was most noted in the modeling world for having been Playgirl magazine's 1992 "Man of the Year". Shafer related that he did Playgirl for "validation" as a model because he never believed himself to be attractive. Shafer wrote, directed and starred in Man of the Year, a 1995 mockumentary about his time as a semi-closeted gay man in the role of a heterosexual sex symbol. Shafer's next directorial project was Circuit, a fictional look at the world of gay male circuit parties.

As of 2008, Shafer was working as a fitness trainer and certified Pilates instructor. In 2012, Shafer returned to the pages of Playgirl for a 20th anniversary photo spread in the August issue.

Shafer was found dead in a vehicle near his home in West Hollywood, California on March 5, 2015. Initial reports indicated he might have suffered a heart attack. Following an autopsy, however, the Los Angeles County Coroner's office determined Shafer's death was the result of "methamphetamine and cocaine toxicity", with hypertensive cardiovascular disease possibly being a contributing factor.

Shafer is buried at Hollywood Forever Cemetery.

== Filmography ==
=== As actor ===
- Will & Grace episode "Cheaters" - Blaze (2001)
- Man of the Year - Himself (1995)

=== As director ===
- Circuit (2002)
- Man of the Year (1995)

=== As writer ===
- Circuit (2002) (with Gregory Hinton)
- Man of the Year (1995)
- Inside Out II (segment "Double Vision") (1992)
