= Male sex work in popular culture =

From the 1960s to present, the male sex worker, or hustler, is a frequent stereotype in literature and movies in Western countries, and elsewhere, especially in literature, theatrical productions, films, television series, and photography. Sometimes this is with a gay perspective, in which the sex worker may be considered a stock character and falls into common stereotypes. Male sex workers also appear occasionally in popular music, contemporary fashion advertising, and the visual arts.

== Stereotypes ==
The most common stereotype of the hustler is as a sexy but tragic figure. This stereotype reveals both a fascination with the hustler as a sexual object and sadness or disdain with his situation and life-style. This stereotyped male hustler is often an underaged or teenage "street kid" or "runaway" forced to leave home because of his sexual orientation or because of sexual abuse. He is often portrayed as a drug addict or thief.

The plotline frequently focuses on the crisis of leaving the trade or the street ("one last trick"), or on making enough money for an important use (a medical treatment, a gift). The climax often has one of two possible outcomes: the hustler either abandons the trade and re-integrates into society, or he meets a tragic end. This tragic image of the hustler can be contrasted with the stereotype of the female hooker with a heart of gold: instead of being portrayed as someone in control and contented, the hustler is lost, homeless, broke or exploited.

In movies and books that take the point of view of the client or of a boy/girlfriend who loves the hustler, the hustler is often depicted as an impossible love object who will only bring hurt or frustration. The lover may grow jealous of and disturbed by the hustler's work; occasionally the loving boy/girlfriend will be drawn into the lifestyle of their hustler boyfriend. Older clients who fall in love with hustlers are frequently prey to emotional (and sometimes physical) pain; this is especially true in the case of "rough trade" (where the hustler identifies as straight), and this depiction has been reinforced by several famous incidents of violence against clients (such as the deaths of Pier Paolo Pasolini and Rudolph Moshammer).

In contrast to the previous depictions, the male prostitute has also sometimes been portrayed as an idealized rebel living outside the law and free of bourgeois conventions. This almost Nietzschean image of the hustler as moral and sexual outlaw owes much to the writings of Jean Genet, William S. Burroughs and John Rechy (among others).

While less frequent in cinema and novels, the male prostitute with exclusively female clients (the "gigolo" or "escort") is generally depicted in a less tragic manner than the gay hustler (the gigolo is portrayed as older, athletic, well-dressed, etc.), and films like American Gigolo have done much to paint the character as a sophisticated seducer. This portrayal has also led to cinematic satire (the Deuce Bigalow films).

The portrayal of the client or "john" of male prostitution in popular culture is far less codified than that of the hustler and runs the gamut from the lonely married man, the self-hating in-the-closet guy, the exploitative or endearing businessman, and even the serial killer.

The diversity of these stereotypes reveals much about each author's or director's personal view of love, sexuality, power and morality.

These stereotypes may have a basis in fact, but they should not be taken as true in all cases.

The same issues that surround male prostitution (including the financial security and social status of the young "kept" lover, the older lover's obsessions and insecurities with regards to his or her youthful love-object, the sexual freedom or moral indifference of the hustler, etc.) often appear in movies and literature that portray amorous or sexual relationships—without prostitution—between an older man or woman and a younger male lover; for example, in Pasolini's novel and movie Theorem, Harold Prince's film Something For Everyone (1970) and Bill Condon's film Gods and Monsters (1998).

== In literature ==
=== 1890s-1950s ===
Various novels, memoirs, and plays, from the 1890s to 1920s, feature male hustlers as major characters. One example is Stephen Crane's 1894 unfinished novel, Flowers of Asphalt, said to be about a boy from the country who becomes a hustler on the streets, taken down by syphilis and drugs, which Crane is said to have read to his mentor, Hamlin Garland, who declared that the pages be burned. Some scholars have questioned its accuracy as it relies upon a one-page note by James Gibbons Huneker. The title was later used by avant-garde filmmaker Gregory Markopoulos for his seven-minute 1951 film of the same name. Edmund White, in his 2007 novel Hotel de Dream, had Crane resuming his writing of Flowers to Asphalt on his deathbed, and renaming it The Painted Boy. Crane's first novel, Maggie: A Girl of the Streets, in 1893, would feature a sex worker protagonist, but was a woman rather than a man.

Years later, in 1924, Romanian working class writer, Panait Istrati, published "Kyra Kyralina", his debut short story. Also known as "Chira Chiralina", this novel also featured a male hustler as a protagonist. Scholar Dale Corvino said that the novel features the "earliest depiction" of a male sex worker in "modern literature." He also noted that, in 1926, John Henry MacKay published a novel entitled "The Hustler" which focused on the attraction a young man in Weimar Berlin has to a "homeless teenage hustler."

The 1940s and 1950s brought more novels with male sex workers as protagonists. This included Jean Genet's Our Lady of the Flowers (Notre Dame des fleurs) in 1943. This free-flowing "erotically-charged" novel was written by Genet while in prison, and his debut work, detailing his personal experience in Paris's underworld, filled with "hustlers, pimps, and drag queens." Six years later, Genet published another novel with a male sex worker as a main character: The Thief's Journal (Journal du voleur). Also autobiographical, it detailed his romantic forays and his time as a thief and hustler in Europe during the 1930s. In 1948, Gore Vidal published The City and the Pillar. The latter novel featured lead character Jim Willard supporting himself as a hustler and a "kept boy". The novel was later described by Vidal, in 1995, as one of the first novels about gay characters, and their experience, "to be published by a mainstream New York press," noting that its publication was delayed for "almost two years" by E.P. Dutton, and the mixed reviews when it was released, since it was a "explicitly gay novel." He also said he had written the character in such a way that some even thought that Vidal himself was "a male prostitute" and good at tennis, even though he was neither, describing the book as "a considerable act of imagination."

In 1951, James Jones published From Here to Eternity. In his original manuscript, Private Angelo Maggio acknowledges acting as trade, allowing gay men to perform oral sex on him for money to supplement his Army pay. The publisher forced the excision of these passages. A new edition of the book with the previously censored passages restored was later released by e-book publisher Open Road. Some years later, in 1957, Hubert Selby Jr. published Last Exit to Brooklyn, with a similar protagonist. Scholar Dan Corvino said that the novel, set in Sunset Park, Brooklyn, in the 1950s, focusing on sex work, drugs, sexual violence, and gangs on the streets, and featured a "female-presenting" male sex worker named Georgette.

=== 1960s to 1970s ===
The 1960s brought on additional novels with male sex workers as protagonists. City of Night, by John Rechy, in 1963 was said to be a "breakthrough" novel. Autobiographical in nature, it details Rechy's life as a hustler in Hollywood and New York, noting his longings, and what one scholar described as the "systemic oppression of the gay underworld." A few years later, followed by Midnight Cowboy by James Leo Herlihy in 1965. Later adapted into a Hollywood film, the book chronicles the odyssey of naïve Texan named Joe Buck from his home state to New York City, where he plans on realizing his dream of becoming a male prostitute servicing rich women.

In 1967, Numbers by Mexican-American novelist John Rechy had a similar protagonist, as did My Father and Myself J. R. Ackerley the following year. One scholar, Frederick Luis Aldama, described the novel has taking place in an "ethnoqueer borderland" in Los Angeles, with a multiracial protagonist, Johnny Rio, who goes on a "chaotic quest" to find his sexual identity, as he goes through the "underbelly of society," with sexual adventures and hunts to fulfill his own gratification. Other scholars said that Rechy incorporated his personal experiences as a hustler, and drifter, into the novel, as he did in City of Night in 1963, described Rio as engaging in a "compulsive search for impersonal sexual contacts" and had an attachment to "abject sexual practices and places" as he tries to reclaim his "youthful sexual attraction."

In 1978, author and musician Jim Carroll published The Basketball Diaries. The memoir, later adapted into a 1995 film, talked about his life in New York City in the 1960s, including "urban counterculture" and the book was said to focus on crime, drug addiction, male prostitution, and his other acts of "youthful hedonism." In Zoo Station: The Story of Christiane F. from the same year, Christiane F.'s boyfriend Detlef works as a hustler to earn money to buy heroin.

=== 1980s to 1990s ===
Richie McMullen, in 1989, published Enchanted Boy. It is a memoir of a boy's journey from "abuse to prostitution" in 1950s England, including Richie experimenting with a friend, Pip, whose prostitution excites and disgusts him in equal measure, and he begins to work as a rent boy. The novel's sequel, in 1990, Enchanted Youth, further talked about his journey from "prostitution to love" in 1958, with both books covering issues of prostitution and abuse. The same year, Dennis Cooper published "Closer", said to explore "extreme boundaries of human behaviour and amorality" and focuses on Miles, a character among teens in Los Angeles who "hang out, do drugs, have sex and listen to music." The novel was also said to center around a "group of gay teenagers in the American suburbs."

In the 1990s, many novels featured male sex workers as protagonists. This included two novels by David Wojnarowicz. The first was Close to the Knives in 1991. The first of Wojnarowicz's memoirs talks about his passage from abused kid to Times Square hustler to artist in New York's East Village underground, and it was published a year before he died of HIV/AIDS. Some said the book used intimate, sexual experiences to examine how "political systems work to exclude and silence the unwanted." The following year, in 1992, Memories That Smell Like Gasoline, second volume of his memoirs, published. It was said to include essays about "adolescent abuse, sexual power, societal neglect, and stigmatized death," often rooted in homophobic attitudes toward him. The next year, Dale Peck published Martin and John featured one or both of the characters as hustlers in several of the parallel narrative scenes.

The following year, 1994, Mark Merlis published "American Studies". The novel focuses on a john, named Reeve, coming to terms with his life while recovering in a hospital after being bashed by a hustler. The same year, Bruce Benderson published "User", described as a lyrical descent into the world of junkies and male hustlers. The novel began from his notes, recording his encounters with "drug addicts and male sex workers during the late-1980s." The same year, Eduardo Mendicutti published Los novios búlgaros, which told the story of a Bulgarian hustler in Madrid in the 1990s. It was later adapted into a 2003 romantic comedy film released in Spain.

In 1995, Scott Heim and "Rachid O" published books with male sex workers as protagonists. Heim's Mysterious Skin, which was later adapted into a film, featured sexual abuse, with protagonist McCormick "prostituting himself" so he can get quick cash, while he relies "on drugs for a temporary high." Rachid O's L'Enfant ébloui is a semi-autobiographic novel about a hustler in Morocco.

In 1996, various pieces of literature were published featuring male sex workers as protagonists. One of those was Charles Isherwood's "Wonder Bread and Ecstasy: The Life and Death of Joey Stefano." The novel focused on Joey Stefano, a gay porn star of the 1990s. Another was Matthew Rettenmund's Boy Culture, which included an index to the sex passages (by preference), and centers on a call boy in the city of Chicago, Illinois and his two roommates. In 2006, it was adapted into a movie by filmmaker Q. Allan Brocka. Also in 2006, Robert Rodi published a comedy novel entitled Kept Boy, and Aidan Shaw published "Brutal." Shaw's novel was the first novel the former prostitute and porn star had published. The same year, James Romberger illustrated a version of David Wojnarowicz's diary and memoirs, entitled Seven Miles A Second for Vertigo Comics.

In 1997, Christopher Donner published Quand je suis devenu fou, in which the narrator falls for a hustler in an Amsterdam brothel. The same year, Diary of a Hustler by "Joey", and Lee Williams' After Nirvana featured male sex workers as protagonists. The latter novel focuses on teenage hustlers Davy, James, Branch, and Davy's girlfriend, Nikki, who work in the "public rest-room and adult video circuits" near Seattle and Portland, Oregon. The following year, Sarah Waters published Tipping the Velvet. In the novel, a young woman in Victorian London is solicited by a man for sex and begins renting, but dressed only as a man for male clients, never letting them know she is a woman. The following year, Brad Clayton published The Queen of Hearts: A Transsexual Romance. The year after, Rich Whitaker published Assuming the Position: A Memoir of Hustling and Aaron Lawrence published Suburban Hustler: Stories of a Hi-Tech Callboy.

=== 2000s to present ===
In 2000, JT Leroy published Sarah. This pseudo-autobiographical story focuses on a boy hustler whose mother was a truckstop prostitute. The author was revealed to be a fictional creation in 2006, an "avatar" for writer Laura Albert.

The following year, H.A. Carson published A Thousand and One Night Stands: The Life of Jon Vincent and Chris Kenry published Can't Buy Me Love. In the latter novel, a young man drifts into the world of escorting with humorous results. The year after, 2002, Joseph Itiel published Sex Workers As Virtual Boyfriends and David Henry Sterry published Chicken: Self-Portrait of a Young Man for Rent. Sterry's book, a memoir, details his experiences as a teenage hustler in 1970s Hollywood. Itiel published another book with a male sex worker as a protagonist, Escapades of a Gay Traveler: Sexual, Cultural, and Spiritual Encounters, in 2003.

In the later 2000s, many other novels also centered on male sex workers. One of those was Bruce Benderson's The Romanian: Story of an Obsession in 2004. This memoir chronicled his affair with a hustler from Eastern Europe named Romulus, as he is researching the expanding sex industry in this part of Europe. Another was Mack Friedman's Setting the Lawn on Fire: A Novel in 2005 and Rupert Everett's Red Carpets and Other Banana Skins in 2006. The latter novel briefly described Everett's past as a rent boy and how he received "reasonably well-paid sexual favours of various kerb-crawlers." A few years later, in 2008, Daniel Allen Cox published "Shuck." The novel is a fictionalized memoir of a New York City hustler, Jaeven Marshall, who dreams of becoming a writer. The same year, Julian Clary published Murder Most Fab. The novel's main character, Johnny, started his life out as a high-class gigolo. The Guardian described the novel's main character as a "hugely endowed male prostitute" who uses manipulation and charisma to make himself a superstar and television presenter.

In 2016, Garth Greenwell published What Belongs to You. The novel was said to detail the ethically ambiguous relations and transactions between Greenwell's unnamed protagonist and a young Bulgarian hustler, Mitko.

== In theater ==
Male sex workers have appeared in various theatrical productions. This has included Pal Joey, a 1940 play authored by Richard Rodgers, Lorenz Hart, and John O'Hara and Entertaining Mr Sloane in 1964, authored by Joe Orton. The latter featured a character named Mr Sloane, played by Dudley Sutton. In later years, Lanford Wilson would author Balm in Gilead. This 1965 play features two sex workers: Franny and Rake. One of them, Franny, is a transvestite.

In 1968, Mart Crowley authored the play The Boys in the Band. This play featured "Cowboy", who was played by Robert La Tourneaux. La Tourneaux reprised the role in the 1970 film version. In 2005, Edwin Sanchez authored Trafficking in Broken Hearts.

== In cinema ==
=== Films with a hustler as a main character ===
==== 1960s to 1980s ====
There are various films with a hustler as a main character. This includes the 1961 films The Roman Spring of Mrs. Stone and Breakfast at Tiffany's. In the first of these films, Karen Stone is introduced to a young Italian man, Paolo (Warren Beatty), who is actually a highly paid professional gigolo. Karen and Paolo begin an affair, but it soon becomes obvious that Paolo is in it only for personal gain. In the second of these films, Paul "Fred" Varjak is maintained by a rich woman, Mrs. Failenson, who leaves him $300 after every sexual encounter. After falling in love with Holly Golightly (played by Audrey Hepburn), Varjak cuts off the relationship. Failenson offers $1000 for a "paid vacation with your girl" and cynically suggests that a union (of gigolos) could "get all the fringe benefits" – but Varjak persists in giving up this way of life.

In 1965, Paul America would play Paul in the film, My Hustler, which depicts competition over the affections of a young male hustler (played by Paul America) among a straight woman (played by Genevieve Charbon), a former male hustler (played by Joe Campbell), and the man who hired the boy’s companionship (played by Ed Hood) via a “Dial-A-Hustler” service. The film, co-directed by Andy Warhol and Chuck Wein, was the subject of plainclothes police surveillance in the audience during its initial theatrical release in 1966, and on April 12 the owners of the Filmmakers' Cinematheque were served a summons to a hearing to show-cause why the theater's license should not be revoked for showing films of "sexual immorality, lewdness, perversion and homosexuality." On November 16, after a defence by the New York Civil Liberties Union, the charges were thrown out.

Joe Dallesandro would play Joe in the 1968 film Flesh. In that film, which Warhol produced and Paul Morrissey directed, Dallesandro hustles to buy drugs for himself and his wife. The following year, Midnight Cowboy would release. It featured Joe Buck, played by Jon Voight, as forming an unlikely friendship with junky Rico "Ratso" Rizzo. The film would win the Best Picture, Best Director, and Best Adapted Screenplay, and would become the only X-rated film to win Best Picture and the only X-rated film ever to win an Academy Award . In 1994, Midnight Cowboy was deemed "culturally, historically or aesthetically significant" by the Library of Congress, and selected for preservation in the United States National Film Registry.

The 1970s would bring more films with male sex workers as protagonist to the fore. One of those was The Boys in the Band in 1970. The film had Robert La Tourneaux playing a character named "Cowboy Tex" and was said to introduce film viewers to "gay humor" with various zingers. A remake of the film was released in 2020. Also in 1970, another film, featuring a hustlers as protagonist, released: Entertaining Mr Sloane. One character was Mr. Sloane, who was played by Peter McEnery It was adapted from the play by Joe Orton.

Some years later, in 1978, Just a Gigolo released in West Germany. It featured David Bowie playing Paul Ambrosius von Przygodski. In the film, an aristocratic Prussian officer returns from World War I to find the world he once knew gone, and to make ends meet, he becomes a gigolo. The film was panned by critics and viewers alike. It was digitally remastered and received its first official release in the United Kingdom in 2021, where it was accompanied by a 54-page booklet on the making of the film. The same year, The Place Without Limits, released in Mexico, had Robert Cobo playing Manuela. Eloy de la Iglesia played a hustler in a Spanish film, Confessions of a Congressman. In that film, a teenage hustler used by the secret police for blackmail falls for the victim.

In the early 1980s, there would be various films with male hustler protagonists. In 1980, Richard Gere played Julian Kaye in American Gigolo, in which a high-class gigolo, Julian, is framed for murder. The film was later adapted into a television series. Two years later, in 1982, Kevin Bacon would play Ricky in Forty Deuce. The film would show him as a conniving hustler who tries to cover-up the overdose death of another kid. Bacon previously won an Obie for the original 1981 off-off Broadway production of the story. The next year, 1983, Jean-Hugues Anglade would play Henri in The Wounded Man, and was initially inspired by Jean Genet's autobiographical novel The Thief's Journal, but kept only the basic idea of a gay relationship with an age gap. This French film would win a César Award for Best Direction. The same year, the Italian film Un ragazzo come tanti, also known as (A boy like many others) and directed by Gianni Minello would feature a male sex worker as a protagonist.

In the late 1980s, Nick Deocampo's Filipino film, Revolutions Happen Like Refrains in a Song and Marek Kanievska's Less than Zero would also have male sex workers as protagonists. In the latter film, Robert Downey, Jr. plays Julian, a young man resorts to performing sexual favors for affluent gay men in order to fund his heroin addiction.

The next year, 1988, Mark Lee would play a male sex worker in the Australian film, The Everlasting Secret Family. The film would focus on homosexuality and prostitution amidst a secret brotherhood. The same year, Allan Paule would play Pol and Noel, two macho dancers in Manila in the Filipino film, Macho Dancer. The film, directed by Lino Brocka from a story and screenplay written by Amado Lacuesta and Ricky Lee, would explore the realities of a young, poor, rural gay man, who after being dumped by his American boyfriend, is forced to support himself and his family in Manila's seamy red-light district. The film's frank depiction of homosexuality, prostitution, drag queens and crooked cops, the porn industry, sexual slavery, and drugs and violence caused Filipino government censors to order extensive edits of the film. Brocka smuggled an uncensored cut out of the Philippines to be shown to a limited number of international film festivals.

Also that year, the film Cop, which was based on the novel by James Ellroy, and Loverboy would have male sex workers as protagonists. In the latter film, Patrick Dempsey plays Randy Bodek, a pizza boy who becomes an escort, while in the former, Dennis Stewart plays a male sex worker named Lawrence "Birdman" Henderson.

==== 1990s ====
The early 1990s would feature male sex workers as protagonists in the German film Via Appia (1990) and My Own Private Idaho (1991). The latter film, directed by Gus Van Sant and known as a "gay hustler film" by focusing on the stories of teenage hustlers, would later be considered a landmark film in New Queer Cinema, an early 1990s movement in queer-themed independent filmmaking. It would become notable for its then-taboo subject matter and avant-garde style.

The same year, I Don't Kiss would release in France, with Manuel Blanc playing Pierre, a boy from the provinces ends up as a hustler in Paris. Also, Balthazar Getty would play Little J. in the film Where the Day Takes You, with Little J. being a young man living on the streets finds temporary refuge with a client. In 1992, two Canadian films would feature male hustlers: Sku Gilbert's "Film" and Jean Dupuis's Being at Home with Claude. The latter film would have Roy Dupuis playing Yves and Lothaire Bluteau as a male prostitute. The former film would be about a male hustler and his roommate. Also, in 1992, two German films with similar characters released: Marcel Gisler's Die Blaue Stunde (The Blue Hour), Peter Kern's Streetchild (Gossenkind). The first of these films would have Max Kellermann playing Axel Glitter, a young hustler in Düsseldorf while the second featured Andreas Herder playing Theo. Lastly, Mike Dytri played Luke, a HIV+ street hustler in The Living End, described by The New York Times as a "handsome hustler".

In 1993, Carsten Sønder's Smukke dreng (Pretty Boy) in Denmark and Ryōsuke Hashiguchi's A Touch of Fever in Japan would have similar characters. The latter film, shot on 16 millimeter film with a small budget and no payment for the actors or the director, focuses on a teenage hustler in love with another. The year after, Steven McLean would release Postcards from America in the UK which focuses on three chapters in David Wojnarowicz's life. Bruce LaBruce would release the semi-autobiographical film Super 8½ in Canada. Also that year, Filipino director Mel Chionglo would release Sibak: Midnight Dancers, which focuses on three brothers in Manila, working as "Macho Dancers" in a gay bar.

In the mid to late 1990s, there were additional films with male sex workers as protagonists. This included Scott Kalvert's The Basketball Diaries, based on the book by Jim Carroll, noting his teenage years as a promising high school basketball player and writer who develops an addiction to heroin, and Larry Turner's "Tattoo Boy". The latter film had Amanda Tirey and C.J. Barkus playing the characters Arizona and Sam. Also, Serbin filmmaker Želimir Žilnik directed Marble Ass, about transvestite prostitutes in Serbia.

Keith Froelich directed The Toilers and the Wayfarers. That film, released in 1996, has Matt Klemp and Andrew Woodhouse play Dieter and Philip, two runaway hustlers in Minneapolis. In 1996 alone there were five other films featuring male sex worker protagonists. One was Hustler White, directed by Rick Castro and Bruce LaBruce, featuring Tony Ward playing Monti. Another was The Unveiling, directed by Rodney Evans. There was also Anne Fontaine's French film, Tapin du soir, which was included in L'Amour est à réinventer. This was one of ten collected short films about life in France in the time of AIDS. The same year, Everett Lewis directed Skin & Bone. In the film, B. Wyatt, Garret Scullin, and Alan Boyce play Harry, Billy, and Dean, three Los Angeles hustlers who are in different stages of their careers. Additionally, Scott Silver directed Johns, with Lukas Haas and David Arquette playing Donner and John.

In the later 1990s, films such as "Private Shows", by Blaine Hopkins and Stephen Winter, From the Edge of the City, by Constantine Giannaris, and "Hard", by John Huckert, would feature male sex worker protagonists. In From the Edge of the City a company of young Pontic Greeks refugees from Russia live in Menidi, a suburb in the edge of Athens. Sasha, the main character, quits his job and collides with his father. His situation spurs him to chase the easy money, ending up in the dark world of prostitution and drugs. Miroslav Čáslavka would play Marek in the Czechoslovak film Mandragora. It would be the last of Wiktor Grodecki's trilogy of films about male prostitution, the other two being Not Angels But Angels and Body Without Soul. Douglas Spain would play Carlos Amando in the film Star Maps, Dane Ritter would play Ben Taylor in In the Flesh, and Vincent Martiz would play Quentin in The School of Flesh. Additionally, Michael Imperioli and James Duval would play Allen Hayden and Jaime in River Made to Drown In. Otherwise, Jesse Bradford would play Johnny in Speedway Junky, a young man with dreams of becoming a stock car racer drifts into the world of prostitution in Las Vegas. Daniel Auteuil would play Pierre in the French film The Escort (Mauvaise Passe). The character Pierre leaves his family and flees to London to work on a novel. There he meets Tom (played by Stuart Townsend), a male escort, who leads Pierre into his underground world of sex and money.

==== 2000s ====
In 2000, there were various films with male sex worker protagonists. One of those films was a Spanish film, Km. 0, directed by Yolanda García Serrano and Juan Luis Iborra. It featured Jesús Cabrero playing Miguel, a gigolo who services female clients. Another film, released in Hungary, was Nincsen nekem vágyam semmi (This I Wish and Nothing More). In the film, which is directed by Kornél Mundruczó, closeted bisexual Brúnó (played by Ervin Nagy) unknown by his girlfriend works as a male prostitute for male clients with her homosexual brother, Ringó (played by Roland Rába). Thirdly, Paul Dano played a Long Island teenager named Howie Blitzer who learns that his best friend, Gary Terro (played by Billy Kay) is a hustler, in the film L.I.E., which is directed by Michael Cuesta.

The following year, Andre Khabbazi played Hector, a hustler who's terrified of growing old, in Circuit, a film directed by Dirk Shafer. Branden Nandon played a teenage hustler finds a father figure who does not want to exploit him in the Canadian film, Jet Boy, which was directed by Dave Schultz. Additionally, Andrés played Leonardo Brzezicki in Vagón fumador (Smokers Only), an Argentinian film directed by Verónica Chen. Leonardo's character is a male prostitute who falls in love with a suicidal woman and a male prostitute. In the year after, 2002, Peter Youngblood Hills played Benjamin in a British film directed by Duncan Roy entitled AKA. James Franco played Sonny, a character who is raised by his mother to be a gigolo, in the film of the same name, directed by Nicolas Cage.

There were at least seven films in 2003 which had male hustlers as protagonists. This included Ian McCrudden's Mr. Smith Gets a Hustler and Eloy de la Iglesia's Bulgarian Lovers. In the latter film, which originated in Spain, Dritan Biba played Kyril. Two U.S. films had similar characters. Robert Allan Ackerman's The Roman Spring of Mrs. Stone, featured Oliver Martinez who played Paolo di Leo in this TV film remake of the original 1961 film. Secondly, Richard LeMay directed 200 American, about New York businessman falls for Australian hustler. The same year, Amal Bedjaoui directed the French film, Un fils (A son) about North-African hustler in France, while Ruthie Shatz and Adi Barash directed the Israeli film Gan (Garden) about two young gay prostitutes in Tel Aviv. Also, Jacob Tierney directed Twist, a Canadian gay-themed film re-telling of Charles Dickens' Oliver Twist, featuring Nick Stahl playing male sex worker Dodge, who takes Oliver under his wing and instructs him in the unforgiving arts of drug abuse and prostitution.

In 2004 there were many films featuring male sex workers as main characters. This included two U.S. films. First was Mysterious Skin, directed by Gregg Araki, with Joseph Gordon-Levitt playing Neil McCormick, and based on Scott Heim's book. Second was Sylvain White's Trois 3: The Escort, with Brian White playing Trenton "Trent" Meyer, a hip-hop promoter becomes an escort after getting into debt with a gangster. In addition, Israeli filmmaker Yair Hochner directed Yeladim Tovim (Good Boy), with Daniel Efrat and Yuval Raz playing Menni and Tal, two rent boys in Tel Aviv. Peter Pizzi directed "My Hustler Boyfriend", a short film which appeared at a video program at Newfest 2005, and John Palmer directed Sugar. The latter film, which premiered in Canada, has Brendan Fehr playing a bisexual male hustler named Butch, in a coming of age story. Quentin Lee directed Ethan Mao. In this Hong Kong film, the eponymous protagonist (played by Jun Hee Lee), a gay teen, is kicked out of his house, forced to become a hustler for money, and meets Remigio (played by Jerry Hernandez), a teen hustler and drug dealer, and the two become friends.

The following year, in 2005, there were various films about male sex workers. This included the U.S. films "Dirty Little Sins", Kery Isabel Ramirez's "Boy Wonder", and Clare Kilner's film, The Wedding Date. In Boy Wonder, a 12 minute color video short which was included in MIX NYC November 2006, Luis lives a double life as "straight male" provider and transvestite prostitute. This contrasts from The Wedding Date in which a woman hires a male escort, Nick Mercer (played by Dermot Mulroney) to pose as her boyfriend. Another U.S. film, Transamerica, directed Duncan Tucker, features Kevin Zegers playing Toby Wilkins, who is hustling on the streets of New York, and found by his mother, a pre-operative trans woman, Bree., There's also Richard Bell's Canadian film, Eighteen, and Neil Jordan's British film, Breakfast on Pluto. In the film, based on the novel by Patrick McCabe, Cillian Murphy plays Patrick/Patricia "Kitten" Braden, who flees Ireland for London during the 1970s and becomes a prostitute.

In 2006, there were additional films with male sex workers as protagonists. At Newfest 2007, Indian filmmaker Ashish Sawhny's Happy Hookers, about three male sex workers in India, and Jeff Maccubin's "Into It", about two hustlers dealing with drugs and relationships, premiered. At Newfest 2006, Todd Wilson's Can't Buy Me Love premiered. Also that year, Q. Allan Brocka directed Boy Culture, which is based on the novel. Lou Peterson directed "In the Blood", a gay supernatural thriller featuring a young man dating a Latino hustler. Additionally, six short films about guys who hustle, entitled "Boy Briefs 4" premiered. These films were: Boy (Welby Ings); Gigolo (Bastian Schweitzer); Build (Greg Atkins); Into the Night (Tony Krawitz); Gold (Armen Kazazian); Rock Bottom (Mary Feuer).

The year after, French filmmaker Jacques Nolot directed Before I Forget, about an aging hustler reflects on his life. One year following that, Joel Viertel directed Strictly Sexual, about two women hiring two unemployed construction workers as sex slaves. Josiane Balasko directed A French Gigolo. In that film, a female television anchor falls in love with an internet escort, Patrick/Marco (played by Eric Caravaca). In 2009, Everett Lewis directed Lucky Bastard. In the film, Denny (played by Dale Dymkoski) is a hustler and meth addict who exploits a man who's fallen in love with him. The film was an Official Selection at Outfest 2009. Another film which came out the same year was Accomplices, a French film directed by Frédéric Mermoud. In the film, two detectives try to solve the murder of Victor, who only appears in flashbacks, with Cyril Descours playing Vincent Bouvier.

==== 2010s to present ====
The 2010s and 2020s would bring various films with sex workers as protagonists. One of those films was Strapped, directed by Joseph Graham. In the film, Ben Bonenfant| plays a nameless hustler encounters a series of gay men as he searches for the exit to a client's apartment building. A few years later, in 2013, Pau Masó would play Aleksandr Ivanov in the film Aleksandr's Price. In the film, a boy named Aleksandr becomes a prostitute in New York, after the death of his mother.

In 2016, Saheb Bhattacharya would play Shekhar in the Indian film Romantic Noy. In the film, a boy named Shekhar becomes a prostitute in Kolkata and he entertains women with his body. While on stage he becomes addicted in drugs.

Some years later, in 2022, Daryl McCormack would play Leo Grande in Sophie Grande's film, Good Luck to You, Leo Grande. During the film, retired widow Nancy Stokes (played by Emma Thompson) hires a good-looking young sex worker called Leo Grande, in the hope of enjoying a night of pleasure and self-discovery after an unfulfilling married life.

=== Other films that include hustlers ===
There's other films that featured hustlers, but not as main characters. This includes Otto Preminger's 1962 film, Advise & Consent. The film features Ray Shaff, a former associate of Senator Brigham Anderson, now supports himself as a hustler in New York City. Years later, in 1984, Yannick Bellon's French film, The Cheat (la Triche), would have similar characters. During the 1990s, there were various such films. This included Oliver Stone's JFK. In the 1991 film, Kevin Bacon plays a gay hustler associated with Oswald. A few years later, in 1993, Knud Vesterskov released By The Dawn's Early Light in Denmark, which had David Wojnarowicz as a narrator.

In the late 1990s, there were various films with hustlers as supporting characters. Curtis Hanson's L.A. Confidential, in 1997, had a subplot with a young would-be actor, played by Simon Baker, who agrees to sleep with the D.A. for cash, but ends up with his throat cut. Another film released the same year, Boogie Nights, by Paul Thomas Anderson also had a hustler as a supporting character. The same was the case for Clint Eastwood's Midnight in the Garden of Good and Evil, which was based on John Berendt's best-selling book, with a prominent Savannah citizen, played by Kevin Spacey shooting to death his lover. Also that year, Wong Kar-wai's Happy Together, released in Hong Kong, featured the brash and irresponsible Ho Po-Wing, played by Leslie Chang, making his money from the street.

In the 2000s, Steven Spielberg's Artificial Intelligence: A.I. in 2001, and Lauren Cantet's Vers le sud (Heading South) in France had similar characters. This was also the case for Tom Ford's A Single Man in 2010.

=== Documentary films ===
Over the years, documentarians have documented the life of male hustlers. This included Shirley Clarke's Portrait of Jason in 1967, which has an interview with African-American gay hustler Jason Holliday. Later, in 1984, Martin Bell released Streetwise. In the film, Seattle street boys struggle to get along without having to sell themselves for sex. In the 1990s, there were various documentary films focusing on male sex workers. This included Run Layumas' Maybe I Can Give You Sex? Part I and Maybe I Can Give You Sex? Part II, which examined gender roles in the Philippines and the lives of macho dancers, bar boys, and their customers, in 1992.

The same year, Andrew Koster released A Kind of Family in Canada, which had a profile of the relationship of a gay city councilman and his straight, street-kid, hustler, drug-abusing, HIV+ foster son. The following year, John-Paul Davidson released Boys From Brazil in Brazil which interviewed Brazilian transvestite prostitutes. Wiktor Grodecki released two films, in Czechoslovakia, about prostitutes in Prague: Not Angels But Angels in 1994 and Body Without Soul in 1996

In the 2000s, there were several films interviewing male sex workers. One of these was a film by Fenton Bailey and Randy Barbato. This film, released in 2000 and entitled 101 Rent Boys, interviewed hustlers who worked on Santa Monica Boulevard. Some years later, in 2006, Todd Verow released Hooks to the Left. The short 75-minute film, from Newfest 2007, and shot on a cell-phone camera, narrated the journal of a New York hustler named Nail. A few years later, in 2009, Rodrigue Jean released Men for Sale. The film, released in Canada, focused on male prostitutes in Montreal, Quebec.

== Television series ==
There have been various television programs feature a hustler as a main character. This included ABC's Alexander: The Other Side of Dawn in 1977. This series, a sequel to Dawn: Portrait of a Teenage Runaway, featured Leigh McCloskey playing Alexander. Some years later, in 1986, Brandon Douglas played Eric Roberts in the series The Children of Times Square. Roberts is a teenage boy runs away to New York City and is immediately recruited by other boys for a man who wants him for sex. He escapes only to end up working for a drug dealer. In 1993, Dafydd aired on BBC. The series featured a Welsh boy/hustler goes to Amsterdam and meets a music teacher. Four years later, Daniel Edwards played Cherrie/Carl in the ITV series Band of Gold. The character turns to hustling to pay for sex reassignment surgery and works as a cross dresser during the character's stint in the series.

The 2000s featured various male sex workers as protagonists. The acclaimed Showtime series, Queer as Folk, which aired from 2000 to 2006, has Harris Allan play James "Hunter" Montgomery, who is pushed into hustling by his mother, and adopted by Michael Novotny and Ben Bruchner. Another series, Trailer Park Boys, which aired on Showcase from 2001 to 2008, featured Randy (played by Patrick Roach) who is a star of this Canadian mockumentary television show, and an ex-prostitute. Additionally, Shawn Pyfrom would play Andrew Van de Kamp in the ABC series Desperate Housewives which aired from 2005 to 2006. The character survived on the streets as a hustler after being thrown out of his house by his mother Bree. From 2006 to 2009, Gregory Michael played Kevin in the series Dante's Cove, which aired on the network, here!, with the character confessing to his boyfriend that he sometimes used to accept money for sex. Lastly, Thomas Jane played Ray Drecker in the HBO series Hung, which began airing in 2009. In the series, Drecker is an unhappy and financially strapped history teacher and basketball coach, who decides to turn his large penis into an opportunity to make money.

In later years, there would be series like Gigolos on Showtime. A reality television series, it followed the lives of five male escorts who service female clients in Las Vegas. Otherwise, Graham Patrick Martin would play Rusty Beck in The Closer, a TNT which aired from 2005 to 2012. Rusty would first appear in the series in 2012 and would survive on the streets as a hustler after his mother disappeared. He would later became a main character on the spin-off series Major Crimes. Additionally, Will Tudor would play Olyvar in the HBO series Game of Thrones, which aired from 2011 to 2019. Olyvar would be a male prostitute employed by Littlefinger, used to spy on noblemen to gain favour with richer nobility / royalty. Furthermore, Dean Geyer would play Brody Weston in the series Glee, which aired on Fox from 2009 to 2015. Brody would be the love interest of Rachel Barry (Lea Michele), whom she breaks up with upon learning he supports himself as a gigolo.

In recent years, there have been other male sex worker protagonists in television series. Finn Wittrock played Dale in Masters of Sex, which aired on Showtime, from 2013 to 2016. Dale is a male prostitute involved with Barton Scully (played by Beau Bridges), a closeted, married university official. Zach Woods played Donald "Jared" Dunn in Silicon Valley, which aired on HBO from 2013 to 2019. Dunn, as one of the main series protagonists, used to work as a male prostitute after graduating from college. In addition, Brandon Flynn played Justin Foley in the Netflix series 13 Reasons Why. Foley lived on the streets and earned money as a hustler for buying drugs.

From 2019 to 2021, Patti Harrison played Ruthie in the Hulu series, Shrill. Ruthie is a trans woman working with Annie (played by Aidy Bryant), who is implied to have worked as a prostitute before her full transition, stating that there were various straight and gay men alike who "liked hitting that." Beginning in 2013, Winston Story played Bill Hummertrout, in Brooklyn Nine-Nine, which aired on Fox from 2013 to 2018 and NBC from 2019 to present. Bill is a gigolo hired by Detective Jake Peralta (played by Andy Samberg) for several Halloween Heists as a distraction due to his resemblance to Charles Boyle (played by Joe Lo Truglio).

== In photography ==
There have been various photographers over the years who frequently use the image of the male prostitute. This has included Larry Clark, Terry Richardson, Nan Goldin, Wolfgang Tillmans, Jack Pierson, Wilhelm von Gloeden, and Philip-Lorca diCorcia.

== See also ==
- Male prostitution
- Gigolo
- Pederasty
- Sex tourism
- Female sex tourism
