= List of Czech films of the 1990s =

A List of Czech films of the 1990s.

Title	Director	Cast	Genre	Notes
1990
Kouř	Tomáš Vorel		Comedy	
Pasťák	Hynek Bočan		Drama	
Pějme píseň dohola	Ondřej Trojan		Comedy	
Vrať se do hrobu!	Milan Šteindler		Comedy	
Vracenky	Jan Schmidt		Comedy	
1991
The Elementary School	Jan Svěrák	Jan Tříska, Zdeněk Svěrák, Libuše Šafránková	comedy	nominated for Academy Award for Best Foreign Language Film
Labyrinth	Jaromil Jireš	Maximilian Schell		
Requiem pro panenku	Filip Renč		Drama	
Slunce, seno, erotika	Zdeněk Troška		Comedy	
Tankový prapor	Vít Olmer		Comedy	
When the Stars Were Red	Dušan Trančík		Drama	entered into the 41st Berlin International Film Festival
1992
Černí baroni	Zdeněk Sirový		comedy	
The Inheritance or Fuckoffguysgoodday	Věra Chytilová	Bolek Polívka, Miroslav Donutil, Dagmar Veškrnová, Karel Gott	comedy	Entered into the 18th Moscow International Film Festival
1993
Konec básníků v Čechách	Dušan Klein		Comedy	
Šakalí léta	Jan Hřebejk		Musical comedy	Czech Lion Award for best film
1994
Accumulator 1	Jan Svěrák		Action Sci-fi Comedy	
Body Without Soul	Wiktor Grodecki		Documentary	
Faust	Jan Švankmajer		Fantasy	submitted for Academy Award for Best Foreign Language Film, screened at the 1994 Cannes Film Festival
Not Angels But Angels	Wiktor Grodecki		Documentary	
Thanks for Every New Morning	Milan Šteindler		Comedy	submitted for Academy Award for Best Foreign Language Film, Czech Lion Award for best film, entered into Moscow
1995
Indiánské léto	Saša Gedeon		Drama	
Zahrada	Martin Šulík		Tragicomedy	Czech Lion Award for best film
1996
Conspirators of Pleasure	Jan Švankmajer	Petr Meissel	Comedy	
Kolya	Jan Svěrák		Black comedy	winner of Academy Award for Best Foreign Language Film, Czech Lion Award for best film
1997
An Ambiguous Report About the End of the World	Juraj Jakubisko		Magical realism	4 Czech Lion Awards, San Diego Film Festival 1998 – best director
Forgotten Light	Vladimír Michálek		Drama	submitted for Academy Award for Best Foreign Language Film
Knoflíkáři	Petr Zelenka		Comedy	Czech Lion Award for best film
Mandragora	Wiktor Grodecki	Miroslav Čáslavka, David Švec, Pavel Skřípal	Psychological thriller	
1998
Sekal Has to Die	Vladimír Michálek		War drama	submitted for Academy Award for Best Foreign Language Film, Czech Lion Award for best film
1999
Cosy Dens	Jan Hrebejk	Miroslav Donutil, Jiří Kodet, Simona Stašová	Comedy-drama	
Return of the Idiot	Saša Gedeon		Romantic comedy, drama	submitted for Academy Award for Best Foreign Language Film
Pelíšky	Jan Hřebejk	Miroslav Donutil, Jiří Kodet, Simona Stašová, Emília Vášáryová, Bolek Polívka	tragicomedy	
