= Prostitution in the Czech Republic =

The pimp at the Spálená Street (illustration for a Prague crime story, Illustrirtes Prager Extrablatt magazine, 1881)

Prostitution in the Czech Republic is in a legal grey-area, neither explicitly legal nor illegal. Organized prostitution (brothels, prostitution rings, pimping, etc.) is prohibited. Ever since the Czechoslovak Velvet Revolution (1989) led to the creation of two independent states — the Czech Republic and Slovakia — prostitution has been flourishing and has contributed its share to the region's booming tourist economy. Prostitution is widespread in Prague and areas near the Republic's western borders with Germany and Austria. In 2002, the Czech Statistical Bureau estimated the trade to be worth six billion crowns ($217 million) a year. UNAIDS estimate there are 13,000 prostitutes in the country.

== Current situation ==
According to the Czech Ministry of the Interior, there are over 860 brothels in the Czech Republic, of which 200 are in Prague. Most of the country's prostitution centers in the Northern Bohemia and Western Bohemia regions and in the capital city. Brothels line the country's roads to Austria and Germany, the source of many customers. Weekend trips to Prague for some tourists also include visits to erotic clubs. There are almost 200 websites for prostitution services in the Czech Republic, up from 45 in 1997, which enable sex tourists to book their travel and appointments to buy sex acts before they leave home. Between 2005 and 2010, Prague had the world's first online brothel, Big Sister, where customers could get free sexual intercourse, with the acts being broadcast on the internet.

An analysis of hospitalization records showed that syphilis rates rose from 1.6 cases per 100,000 inhabitants in 1990 to 13.7 per 100,000 in 2001, an eightfold increase.

== Sex trafficking ==
The Czech Republic is a source, transit, and destination country for women and children trafficked from Ukraine, Russia, Belarus, Moldova, Lithuania, Romania, Bulgaria, Slovakia, China, and Vietnam into and through the Czech Republic mainly for the purpose of sexual exploitation. Czech victims and those transiting the country are trafficked to Western Europe and the United States, sometimes via third countries. Internal trafficking occurs from low employment areas to Prague and regions bordering Germany and Austria. Ethnic Roma women are at the highest risk for internal trafficking, and almost always are trafficked by a relative or someone known to them previously. There have recently been unconfirmed reports of Roma children as young as 13 who have either sold themselves or been sold by others for acts of prostitution in Brno, the second largest city in the Czech Republic, where drug abuse among Roma teenagers is alarmingly prevalent.

The Government of the Czech Republic fully complies with the minimum standards for the elimination of trafficking. In 2004, the Czech Government strengthened its anti-trafficking legislation and turned its pilot victim assistance program into a nationwide government-funded program. While enforcement statistics improved during the reporting period, sentences imposed on traffickers remained low.

=== Prosecution ===
The Czech police increased its capacity to investigate and convict traffickers over the reporting period, although the overall numbers of cases prosecuted pursuant to anti-trafficking legislation remained low and sentences imposed remained weak. Amendments to the Czech Penal Code went into effect in November 2004, making all forms of trafficking illegal, including labor exploitation and internal trafficking. Maximum trafficking penalties were increased from 12 to 15 years, with a minimum penalty of two years. In 2004, Czech authorities investigated 30 individuals and prosecuted 19 under the trafficking statutes. The courts convicted 12 traffickers under those statutes, an increase from five in 2003. Of the 12 convicted, three received unconditional prison sentences of three to five years, and nine received conditional or suspended sentences. Police training curricula included segments on trafficking, and a new internal website for police provided trafficking awareness information. While no government officials were indicted or convicted for complicity in trafficking, allegations continued about the involvement of individual border police officers facilitating illegal border crossings. Czech law enforcement conducted joint anti-trafficking investigations with Germany, Slovakia, Austria, Poland, and Ukraine in 2004.

=== Protection ===
The Czech Government continued to improve trafficking protection and assistance. In November 2004, the Model of Support and Protection of Victims of Trafficking in Persons was expanded to a permanent, government-funded program that is open to all foreign and Czech victims. This program involves close cooperation between the government and NGOs, and allows the victims a 30-day reflection period to receive assistance and consider whether to assist in prosecuting their traffickers. From January 2004 to January 2005, 14 trafficking victims — including one forced labor victim — took part in the program. Many victims chose to apply for asylum, which allows them legal status in the Czech Republic until their cases are decided — a process which can take months or years. The government houses victims and potential victims applying for asylum with other at-risk groups in guarded asylum centers to prevent unwanted contact with traffickers. The government funded several NGOs and international organizations for sheltering and care of victims; two of the Czech Republic's principal organizations provided shelter to 68 trafficking victims in 2004.

=== Prevention ===
The Ministry of Interior is currently collaborating with IOM to produce a demand-reduction campaign targeting clients of commercial sex outlets along the Czech–German border area. A government-fund-ed NGO conducted awareness campaigns among potential trafficking victims at schools and asylum centers. The Ministry of Foreign Affairs continued to provide trafficking information to applicants for Czech visas from identified trafficking source countries. The Crime Prevention Department continued awareness programs at schools. In addition to the Czech National Action Plan on trafficking adopted in 2003, the government in July 2004 adopted a plan to combat commercial sexual abuse of children.

== Failed legalization attempt ==
Prostitutes in the Czech Republic work in a legal grey area, neither explicitly legal nor illegal, which makes it difficult for the state to control disease, the sex-slave trade and underage prostitution.

The Czech government has attempted to legalize and regulate prostitution, but these efforts have failed.

In 2005, the Czech government approved a law to license prostitutes and confine the trade to certain areas as part of an effort to curb prostitution and reduce organized crime. However, the law needed the approval of the parliament and the parliament failed to approve it.

"The assumption is that it is unrealistic to effectively ban prostitution," the ministry proposal said. "It is only possible ... to set rules so the public does not perceive prostitution as a serious public order problem or health risk."

The plan called for prostitutes to buy licenses, undergo monthly health checks, pay taxes and have health insurance. Annual licenses would have only been issued to Czechs and other European Union nationals older than 18 who had no criminal record. It would have been illegal to operate without a license, and those who refused to register would have been prosecuted and would have faced fines. Soliciting sex would have been banned near schools, playgrounds, churches and cemeteries.

The general opinion is that while prostitution should be legal and sex workers registered, politicians seem unwilling to take a stand and many doubt that workers would register in the first place. UK police superintendent John Mottram, working as an advisor to the Czech government on organised crime, said that the interior ministry in Prague does not see prostitution as a priority. "Unfortunately, they are not devoting the kind of attention to it which I think they should."

Opposition to the Czech government's plan to legalize prostitution came from a group of international human-rights activists representing diverse political and philosophical positions. 110 signatories for organizations representing millions of members sent a letter to Czech President Václav Klaus and other government officials, urging them to reconsider.

We are writing to express our profound concern over the prospect that the Czech Republic may be planning to legalize prostitution ... We believe that such action would be a terrible mistake for the country as a whole and, in particular, for the women and children of the Eastern Europe region who will be victims of the Czech Republic sex trade ... We are certain that legalizing prostitution within the Czech Republic will not curb abuses such as child prostitution and enslaving sex trafficking. Organized crime controls the "industry" and, in a legalized regime, it will have an enhanced capacity to do so ... Brothels are sexual gulags for women and girls ... A decision to accommodate traffickers, pimps, and organized crime's slave trade in girls and women [is] an act unworthy of Czechs' traditions of fighting for their own freedom. It is an act we will resist with every democratic means available to us, and will fight in Congress and our legislatures, through our organized women's movements and from tens of thousands of church and synagogue pulpits. At a minimum, we are determined that our efforts will in financial terms alone, be more costly to the Republic — and not in terms of tourism alone — than any hypothetical financial gains claimed. We close by urging you to reject the calls for legalization that sully the reputation of the Czech Republic and dishonor its history. Please take a leadership role in resisting the trade in women and children and please, in a manner consistent with your traditions, maintain the Republic as a model for human rights and democracy.

== Organisations helping prostitutes ==
- "Rozkoš bez rizika" (R-R, Bliss Without Risk) is a small non-governmental organization, founded in 1992 and funded mainly by the state and municipalities. It is dedicated to HIV/AIDS and STD diagnosis and prevention among female sex-workers by educating prostitutes on safer sex techniques, health and self-defense. R-R operates help centres in Prague and Brno.
- "La Strada" is a small civic association active in area of combating human trafficking, founded in 1995. It operates a center in Prague and a phone helpline.
- "Projekt šance" (Project Chance) is a small organisation helping mainly young homosexual prostitutes. Founded in 1995 by László Sümegh it concentrates on streetwork activity and operates a center in Prague.
- Other organisations providing these services are "Caritas Czech Republic" (Charita Česká republika, countrywide), "PREV Centrum" in Cheb (prevention among children), " Time for Life in the Streets" in Cheb (help for prostitutes), "KARO / Marita P" in Cheb (help for prostitutes) and specialised institutions in civil service and police.

== Literature ==
- Milena Lenderová: "Chytila patrola...aneb prostituce za Rakouska i republiky" [Caught by the police patrol, or prostitution at the time of the Austro-Hungarian Empire and the First Czechoslovak Republic], 2002, ISBN 80-246-0379-9. A study about prostitution in Czech lands during the monarchy and early years of the republic.
- Eva Vaníčková: "Dětská prostituce" [Children prostitution], 2005, ISBN 80-247-1138-9. Includes chapter about current situation in the Czech Republic.
- "Trafficking in Women: The Czech Republic Perspective" (PDF). research document by United Nations Office on Drugs and Crime and United Nations Interregional Crime and Justice Research Institute. 2004. Archived from the original (PDF) on 19 July 2006. ISBN 80-7338-32-3
- Barbara Havelková: [Prostitution Law and Policy in the] Czech Republic’ in Jahnsen S and Wagenaar H (eds), Assessing Prostitution Policies in Europe (Routledge 2017)

== See also ==
- Not Angels But Angels (documentary)
- Body Without Soul (documentary)
- Mandragora (drama based on the above documentaries by Wiktor Grodecki)
