= The Roman Spring of Mrs. Stone =

1961 film by José Quintero

- Film poster
- Directed by: José Quintero
- Screenplay by: Gavin Lambert; Jan Read
- Based on: The Roman Spring of Mrs. Stone (1950 novel) by Tennessee Williams
- Produced by: Louis de Rochemont
- Starring: Vivien Leigh; Warren Beatty; Lotte Lenya; Jill St. John; Coral Browne
- Cinematography: Harry Waxman
- Edited by: Ralph Kemplen
- Music by: Richard Addinsell
- Production companies: Seven Arts Productions; De Rochemont Associates
- Distributed by: Warner Bros. (international); Warner-Pathé Distributors (U.K.)
- Release dates: December 22, 1961 (Beverly Hills); December 28, 1961 (U.S.)
- Running time: 103 minutes
- Country: United States; United Kingdom
- Language: English

The Roman Spring of Mrs. Stone is a 1961 romantic drama film directed by José Quintero from a screenplay by Gavin Lambert and Jan Read, and starring Vivien Leigh, Warren Beatty and Lotte Lenya. It is an adaptation of the 1950 novel by Tennessee Williams, about a middle-aged actress (Leigh) who starts an affair with a younger male gigolo (Beatty) after her husband's death.

This was the only theatrical film by Quintero, mainly a theatre director. It was produced by Louis de Rochemont and distributed by Warner Bros.

Despite a poor showing at the box office, The Roman Spring of Mrs. Stone was well-received by critics, and Williams considered it the finest film adaptation of any of his works. Lotte Lenya was nominated for an Academy Award and a Golden Globe Award for her performance.

== Plot ==
Karen Stone, an acclaimed American stage actress and her businessman husband are off on holiday to Rome. On the plane, her husband, a multi- millionaire, suffers a fatal heart attack. Karen decides to stay in Italy and rent a luxury apartment in Rome. She has no reason to go home. She shut down her latest play, Shakespeare's "As You Like It", because she realizes she is far too old to play Rosalind. A year later, the Contessa Magda Terribili-Gonzales, a procurer, introduces her to a handsome, well-dressed, narcissistic young Italian named Paolo, who is one in her stable of professional gigolos.

Magda plots and plans, telling Paolo that Mrs. Stone has just begun to taste loneliness. Paolo and Mrs. Stone go out for dinner and dancing, but no more. Eventually, she begins the affair. She falls in love with him; he pretends to love her. She believes that she is different from other mature women he has known. Her self-deception is aided by the fact that she does not actually pay him, but buys him expensive clothes and gifts, including a movie camera, and pays his bills through charge accounts. They become the subject of gossip columns. It soon becomes obvious that Paolo is only interested in himself. Eventually he is bored by Mrs. Stone's possessiveness and pursues an American starlet.

Abandoned by Paolo, ridiculed by the Contessa, with her only real friend, Meg, on a plane to New York, Mrs. Stone looks over her balcony and sees the ragged, mysteriously menacing young man who has followed her everywhere since the day she moved in, pacing. She tosses the keys of her apartment down to him and walks back inside, remembering what she told Paolo after he tried to frighten her with a story about a middle-aged woman murdered on the French Riviera by someone she invited into her apartment: "All I need is three or four years. After that, a cut throat would be a convenience". She lights a cigarette and sits down to wait. The youth comes into the apartment and walks toward her slowly, hands deep in the pockets of his filthy coat, smiling faintly as his shadow fills the screen.

== Cast ==
- Vivien Leigh as Karen Stone
- Warren Beatty as Paolo Di Leo
- Lotte Lenya as Contessa Magda Terribili-Gonzales
- Coral Browne as Meg
- Jill St. John as Barbara Bingham
- Jeremy Spenser as young man
- Stella Bonheur as Mrs. Jamison-Walker
- Peter Dyneley as Lloyd Greener
- Carl Jaffe as Baron Waldheim
- Harold Kasket as tailor
- Viola Keats as Julia McIlheny
- Cleo Laine as singer
- Bessie Love as Bunny
- Elspeth March as Mrs. Barrow
- Henry McCarty as Campbell Kennedy
- Warren Mitchell as Giorgio
- John Phillips as Tom Stone
- Paul Stassino as Stefano, the barber
- Ernest Thesiger as the other Stefano
- Mavis Villiers as Mrs. Coogan
- Maria Britneva as Principessa Bonmeni
- Edward de Souza and Jean Marsh as party guests

== Production ==
Williams had approval over director and screenwriter; he had worked with Quintero several times in the theatre and admired Gavin Lambert's The Slide Area.

=== Casting ===
The first actor offered the part of the countess was Elisabeth Bergner who turned it down.

According to Quintero, "Warren was never popular with the crew. Out of what I can only imagine to be insecurity, he was arrogant and huffy to Vivian. He kept people waiting." However, in his 2010 Beatty biography, Star: How Warren Beatty Seduced America, Peter Biskind disputes this characterization of the Beatty-Leigh relationship, quoting screenwriter Gavin Lambert as saying, "He was very polite, very well-behaved, didn't show off at all. Vivian was very, very taken with him." Lotte Lenya is also quoted in the book as saying, "Like most women, Vivien had a tremendous crush on Warren. He kept her so preoccupied that she allowed me to steal our most important scenes together."

=== Filming ===
The film was going to be entirely shot in Italy, with Quintero conducting several weeks of location and pre-production in Rome. However, the Italian Ministry of Culture objected to the script due to its portrayal of "café society vice". Unwilling to change the script, producer Louis de Rochemont secured a deal to shoot the film at Elstree Studios in England instead. A number of scenes set outside were rewritten to be set inside where they could be filmed in England. Permission was eventually granted for three weeks of exterior location shooting in Rome.

Peter Yates was the film's assistant director.

== Reception ==
=== Box office ===
The film was not a box office success.

=== Critical response ===
Variety called it a "gloomy, pessimistic portrait of the artist as a middle-aged widow" adding the "curiosity factor" in Leigh's appearance might "avert the dubious boxoffice career which the enterprise might be destined" as the film "seems in for some tough sledding, principally because of the unhappy, unsavory characters... an audience will have enormous difficulties establishing compassion, let alone identification."

In his memoirs, Tennessee Williams called it his favorite movie of all those made from his work. "I think that film is a poem. It was the last important work of both Miss Leigh and of the director, José Quintero, a man who is as dear to my heart as Miss Leigh is."

Film historian Leonard Maltin gave the film a positive three (out of four) stars, noting that "Lenya, as Leigh's waspish friend, comes off best."

=== Awards and nominations ===
Award	Year	Category	Nominee	Result	Ref.
Academy Award	1962	Best Supporting Actress	Lotte Lenya	Nominated	
Golden Globes	1962	Best Supporting Actress – Motion Picture	Lotte Lenya	Nominated	

== Television remake ==
In 2003, an Emmy Award-winning made-for-cable version was produced for Showtime Networks starring Helen Mirren, Anne Bancroft, and Olivier Martinez.

== See also ==
- Male prostitution
- Gigolo
- Male prostitution in the arts
- Female sex tourism
- American Gigolo
