= Romantic Noy =

Romantic Noy is a Bengali drama film based on male prostitution. Saheb Bhattacharya plays the role of a prostitute who sells his body to women. The film was directed by Rajib Chowdhury and produced by Omprakash Saraogi. It was released on 18 November 2016 under the banner of Om Cine Movies. This is Chowdhury's directorial debut in the Tollywood Film Industry. The music was released by Amara Muzik.

== Plot ==
A small town boy, Shekhar, comes to Kolkata to stay and earn money. He falls in love with Sumitra. Partha, a gay friend of Shekhar's, introduces him to Shilpi, a madam, and he enters a sex racket in Kolkata. He becomes a gigolo or a male prostitute and starts to sell his body to women, thereafter starting a journey into darkness, losing his love. Shekhar has no way out but to succumb to Shipli's pressure and cater to the lustful demands of his clients. He begins to lead a frustrated life of drugs, alcohol and sex. With his erotic beauty he seduces girls who become his clients. At this point he meets a girl, Medha, who brings a new wave of happiness in Shekhar's life and Shekhar thinks of starting his life again. But when Medha learns the truth about Shekhar she breaks up with him, because he is a whore. At last Shekhar returns to his hometown from Kolkata to start a new life.

== Cast ==
- Saheb Bhattacharya as Shekhar
- Soumitra Chatterjee as Psychiatrist
- June Malia as Shilpi
- Priyanka Sarkar as Medha
- Sayani Datta as Sumitra
- Rajesh Sharma as Shekar's Boss
- Moumita Mitra
- Deboprasad Halder
- Parthosarathi Chakraborty as Partha

== See also ==
- American Gigolo
- Male prostitution
- Gigolo
- Male prostitution in the arts
- Female sex tourism
- Magic Mike
- Magic Mike XXL
- Ladykillers
- Chocolate City
- Chocolate City: Vegas Strip
