= The Roman Spring of Mrs. Stone (2003 film) =

2003 film directed by Robert Allan Ackerman

- DVD Cover
- Based on: The Roman Spring of Mrs. Stone by Tennessee Williams
- Written by: Martin Sherman
- Directed by: Robert Allan Ackerman
- Starring: Helen Mirren; Olivier Martinez; Anne Bancroft; Brian Dennehy; Rodrigo Santoro
- Theme music composer: John Altman
- Countries of origin: United States; Ireland
- Original language: English

Production
- Executive producer: Hilary Heath
- Producers: James Flynn; Morgan O'Sullivan
- Cinematography: Ashley Rowe
- Editor: Melissa Kent
- Running time: 114 minutes
- Production company: Showtime Networks

Original release
- Network: Showtime
- Release: May 4, 2003

The Roman Spring of Mrs. Stone is a 2003 made-for-television romantic drama film and a remake of the 1961 film of the same name based on the 1950 novel of the same title by Tennessee Williams. The film premiered on May 4, 2003, on Showtime.

== Plot ==
The film follows the odyssey of Karen Stone, an actress who loses her husband to a heart attack. In Rome, she meets a contessa and another man with other romantic intentions and interests that have nothing to do with Mrs. Stone.

== Production ==
The screenplay was written by Martin Sherman, based on the Tennessee Williams novel. Variety noted that he "distills the essence of the story — a repressed woman’s sexual awakening — into a provocative piece that relies as much on visuals as it does narrative." The film was directed by Robert Allan Ackerman and produced by James Flynn and Morgan O'Sullivan. It was shot on location in Dublin and Rome. It is Anne Bancroft's final film appearance.

== Cast ==
Sources:

- Helen Mirren — Karen Stone
- Olivier Martinez — Paolo di Lio
- Anne Bancroft — Contessa
- Brian Dennehy — Tom Stone
- Rodrigo Santoro — Young Man

== Releases ==
It first aired in the United States on Showtime on May 4, 2003, and released on DVD by Showtime Entertainment in 2004.

== Awards and nominations ==
Year	Award	Category	Nominee(s)	Result	Ref.
2003	Online Film & Television Association Awards	Best Actress in a Motion Picture or Miniseries	Helen Mirren	Nominated	
2003	Online Film & Television Association Awards	Best Supporting Actor in a Motion Picture or Miniseries	Brian Dennehy	Nominated	
2003	Online Film & Television Association Awards	Best Supporting Actress in a Motion Picture or Miniseries	Anne Bancroft	Nominated	
2003	Online Film & Television Association Awards	Best Ensemble in a Motion Picture or Miniseries		Nominated	
2003	Online Film & Television Association Awards	Best Costume Design in a Motion Picture or Miniseries		Nominated	
2003	Primetime Emmy Awards	Outstanding Lead Actress in a Miniseries or a Movie	Helen Mirren	Nominated	
2003	Primetime Emmy Awards	Outstanding Supporting Actress in a Miniseries or a Movie	Anne Bancroft	Nominated	
2003	Primetime Emmy Awards	Outstanding Directing for a Miniseries, Movie or a Dramatic Special	Robert Allan Ackerman	Nominated	
2003	Primetime Emmy Awards	Outstanding Costumes for a Miniseries, Movie or a Special	Dona Granata and Gill Howard	Nominated	
2003	Primetime Emmy Awards	Outstanding Music Composition for a Miniseries, Movie or Special (Dramatic Underscore)	John Altman	Nominated	
2004	American Society of Cinematographers Awards	Outstanding Achievement in Cinematography in Movies of the Week/Pilot (Basic or Pay)	Ashley Rowe	Nominated	
2004	Golden Globe Awards	Best Miniseries or Motion Picture Made for Television		Nominated	
2004	Golden Globe Awards	Best Actress in a Miniseries or a Motion Picture Made for Television	Helen Mirren	Nominated	
2004	Satellite Awards	Best Actress in a Miniseries or a Motion Picture Made for Television	Helen Mirren	Nominated	
2004	Satellite Awards	Best Actress in a Supporting Role in a Series, Miniseries or a Motion Picture Made for Television	Anne Bancroft	Nominated	
2004	Screen Actors Guild Awards	Outstanding Performance by a Female Actor in a Miniseries or Television Movie	Anne Bancroft	Nominated	
2004	Screen Actors Guild Awards	Outstanding Performance by a Female Actor in a Miniseries or Television Movie	Helen Mirren	Nominated	

== See also ==
- Male prostitution
- Gigolo
- Male prostitution in the arts
- Female sex tourism
- American Gigolo
