= Sex tourism =

Travel to engage in sexual activity

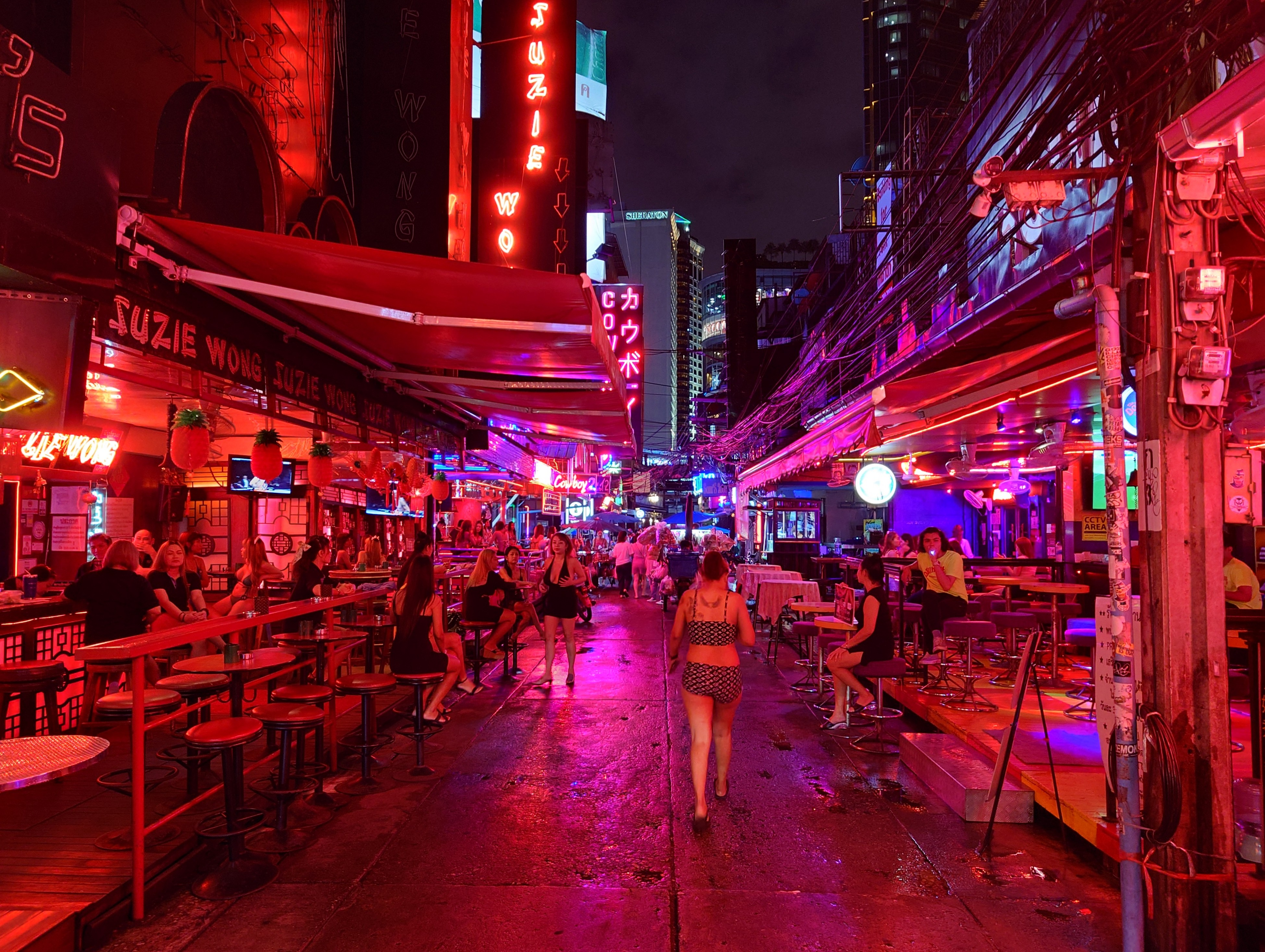
Soi Cowboy, a red light district in Bangkok

Sex tourism is the practice of traveling to foreign countries, often in the Global South, with the intention of engaging in paid sexual activity or relationships. The World Tourism Organization of the United Nations has acknowledged that this industry is organized both within and outside the structured laws and networks created by them.

Sex tourism is commonly regarded as a transnational challenge, as it can be seen to target marginalised demographics in developing nations, such as countries in the Americas or Southeast Asia. The chief ethical concerns arise from: the economic gap between sex solicitor and sex worker, the sexual trafficking of victims, potential exploitation of minors, and the sex solicitor taking advantage of the ease with which they may engage with sex workers. These groups and individuals are subject to the foreign prostitution laws of the destination's jurisdiction, often resulting in exploitation and abuse. Prostitution involving minors is formally illegal in all countries. However, in practice, child prostitution has been documented in certain regions, where enforcement may be weakened by corruption or inadequate legal protections. Effective enforcement is essential for protection of minorities from exploitation and abuse.

Sex tourism is known to be a multibillion-dollar industry, with service industries such as the airline, taxi, restaurant and hotel industries profiting. The bulk of sex tourism involves men traveling from countries in the Global North to countries in the Global South, such as in Southeast Asia and Latin America. Although rarer, female sex tourism also exists.

== History ==
=== Europe ===
As a part of the Grand Tour tradition in Europe from the 1600s to the early 1800s, upper-class men were expected to gain sexual experience while traveling, especially when in Italy.

=== United States ===
During the Grand Tour of Charles La Trobe and Albert von Pourtalès, Pourtalès engaged in what might now be called sex tourism; he frequently traded with locals, and watched powwows and lacrosse games, in order to gain sexual favors from indigenous women.

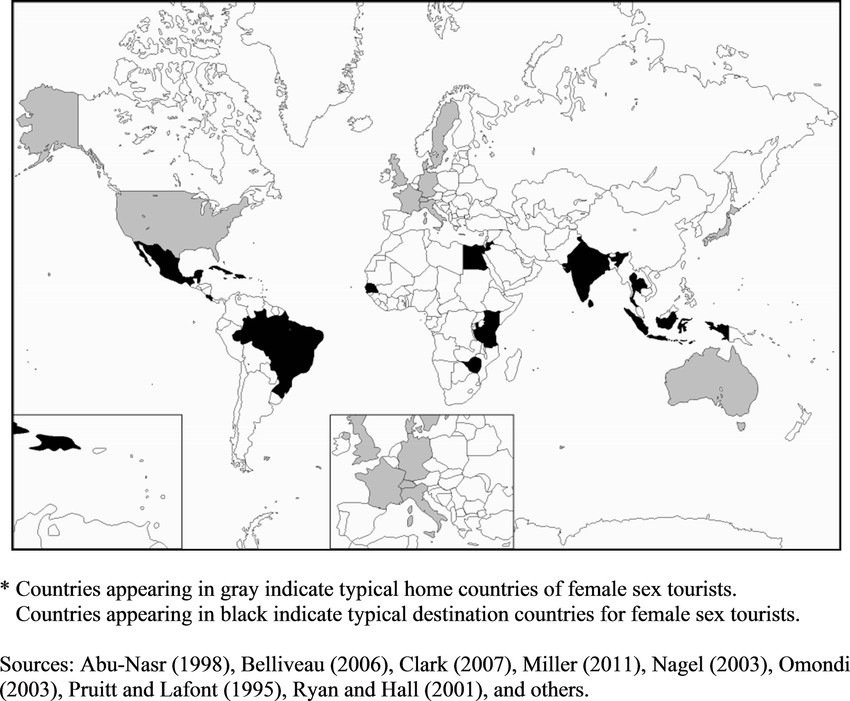
World map of countries involved in female sex tourism

== Legal issues and regulations ==
This particular industry of prostitution is a reason for male travels but has been criticised due to fueling trafficking and is extremely profitable. Many countries have tried to prohibit this type of tourism, as it preys on vulnerable children and marginalised women, and have made efforts to change the type of tourists coming.

Ethical issues arise due to the situations of participating parties; many victims of prostitution are from low-income backgrounds usually located in underdeveloped societies whose only means for providing basic needs is to engage in sexual services.

Government and law enforcement often do not place priority on policing prostitution and sex trafficking. For example, in Cambodia, the Cambodian government has previously overlooked tourists raping or grooming with Cambodian adolescents.

Individuals are not exempt from prosecution. Sex tourism as recognised by the CDC supports human trafficking and slavery. Even if prostitution is legal in a country or region, human trafficking, sexual encounters with a minor, and child pornography are almost universally criminal in nature and individuals caught breaking these laws can be prosecuted. Citizens of any foreign country must abide by the laws of the country in which they hold citizenship in addition to the local laws of the country they are visiting, including laws regarding consent.

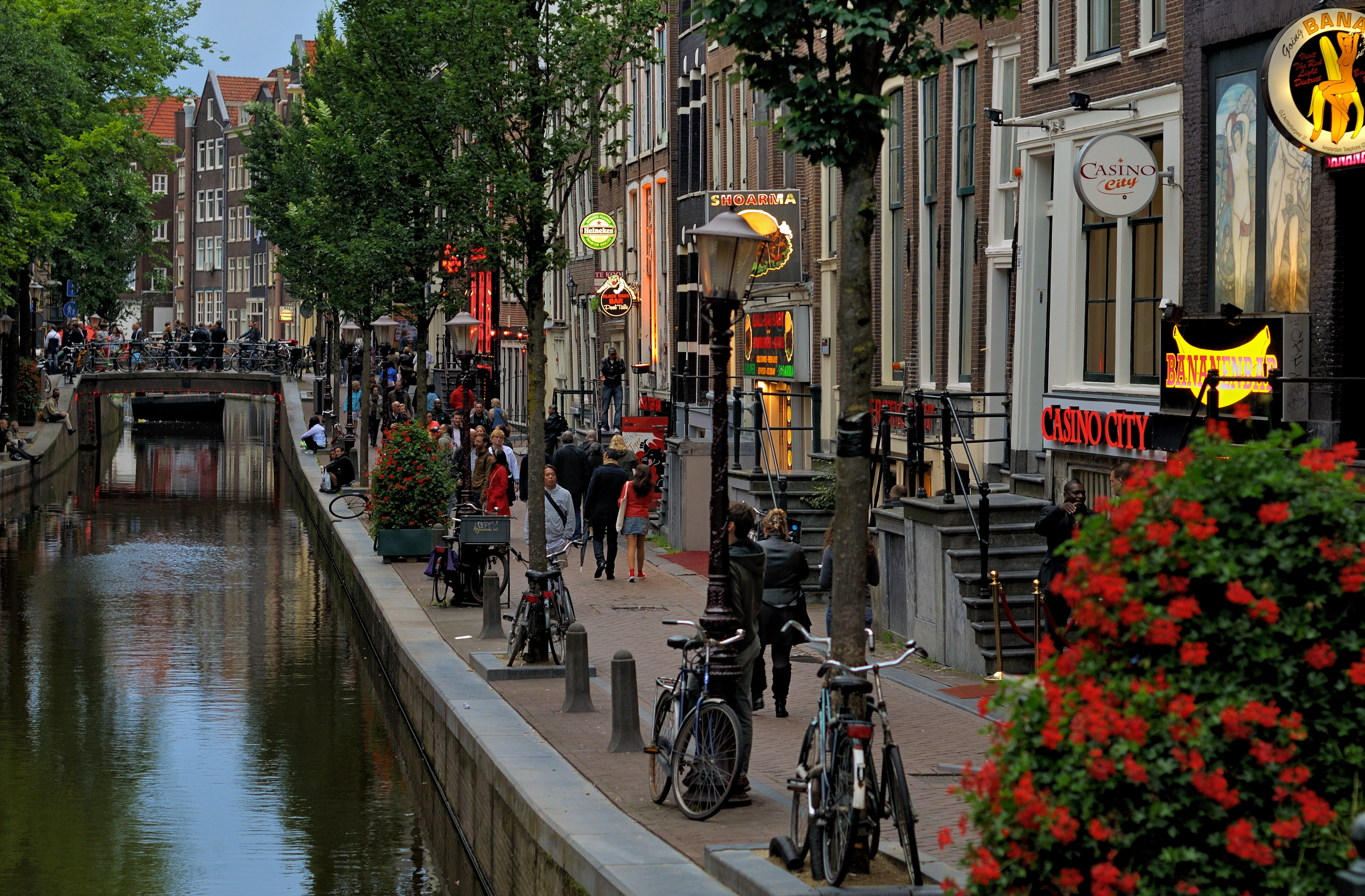
De Wallen, Amsterdam's red-light district, offers activities such as legal prostitution and a number of coffee shops that sell marijuana. It is one of the main tourist attractions.

Regulations and government involvement can be seen to have a positive impact on the community. It is argued that, by decriminalising prostitution, a government can protect sex workers under labor laws accessible by workers in other fields. For example, in the Netherlands, sex workers have access to unlimited free STI testing.

A growing crisis in Southeast Asia is online coercion of children into sexual exploitation, perpetuated by the lack of e-regulations and corresponding policies existing in states such as Cambodia and Thailand. On an international scale, it is naive to insist upon the complete shutdown of sex industries that keep countries’ economies afloat and support many vulnerable families. Instead, governments and international organizations must investigate solutions to address gender-based marginalization in education and job markets, mitigate violence and child exploitation in the sex tourism sphere, and address the global political economy that subjugates the Global South to intensive and dangerous labour.

The criminalisation of sex-related jobs may be seen to increase workers' vulnerability to HIV by escalating stigma and discernment. It is suggested that judgement towards sex workers within the healthcare community acts as a barrier to accessing regular and informed care.

== Demographics ==
Sex tourists are most often male and coming from "Western world" countries. However, the idea that those engaging with sex tourism are entirely white is a misconception - South Koreans spent 12 billion USD on prostitution in 2015. The most common destinations for these sex tourists is to visit less economically developed nations in Southeast Asia such as Thailand, the Philippines, Vietnam, and Cambodia, as well as Nepal and The Gambia. Countries in Latin America like Mexico, Brazil, and Cuba are also common. Cambodian author and trafficking victim Somaly Mam has described in detail how the government overlooked child sex trafficking to Western males.

Author Kajsa Ekis Ekman writes in her book Being and Being Bought - Prostitution, Surrogacy and the Split Self, that the reason Thailand today has become a sex tourism hub is due to the Vietnam War. The Thai government made an agreement with the US Army to provide brothels ("rest and recreation centers") for soldiers on leave. These soldiers would, after the war ended, go back and engage in sex buying or start brothels themselves.

A study conducted by the non-profit public charity ProCon, revealed the percentage of men who had paid for sex at least once in their lives between 1994 and 2010. It found the highest rates were located in Cambodia, where 59–80% of men had paid for sex at least once. Thailand was a close second with an estimated 75% of men, followed by Italy at 16.7–45%, Spain at 27–39%, Japan at 37%, the Netherlands at 13.5–21.6%, and the United States 15.0–20.0%.

Challenges in gathering data has made it hard to find out the exact number of people who work in the sex tourism industry. Estimates show 24.9 million victims that are trapped in modern-day slavery, 4.8 million (about 19%) were sexually exploited. It is estimated that about 21% of the total victims of commercial sexual exploitation are children, with the US Department of State estimating that over one million children are trafficked for sex throughout the world. The sex tourism industry often preys on those that are the most vulnerable, potentially explaining why children and women are more likely to be forced into the industry.

== Cultural attitudes ==
Globally, there are different cultural attitudes towards sex tourism. In less developed countries for example, families in poor rural areas may sell their children to human traffickers, who will take the children to major cities to work in the sex industry. In Thailand for example, women will support their husbands by becoming prostitutes. To send daughters into the sex industry, particularly in less developed countries, can often be seen as a viable source of income available to struggling families from low socioeconomic backgrounds.

The cultural attitudes of sex tourism in highly developed countries such as Australia however where sex trafficking is illegal and highly policed can offer a different perspective to those of low socioeconomic backgrounds. Brothels are still vivid within states such as New South Wales, Tasmania and Victoria where people can exchange money for sex. Recent studies suggest that sex slavery is still happening in Australia, exploiting the vulnerability of individuals and families from poor backgrounds.

Sex tourism can evade the shame associated with prostitution in one’s home country. In a forum on sex work in the Philippines and Thailand, a member stated “we see that everybody else is relaxed and happy paying for sex and this leads to a feeling of liberation because there isn’t the sense of guilt or embarrassment that we might feel if we were with a prostitute back home”. Those engaging in sex tourism often seek to neutralize behaviour. In Weitzer (2025), it is recognized that sex tourists “deny injury” (p. 4), by claiming sex workers are working consensually and of their own free will. Further, both those paying for and providing services of sex tourism often attribute the need for sex tourism to wider issues of global economic oppression. For example, most Southeast Asian sex workers send portions of their earnings to support their family members, leading to sex work being viewed as reciprocal care/providing for the public good. Coercion occurs because of institutionalized norms and dire needs (e.g., a woman must engage in sex work out of necessity to support her siblings financially), not just direct force.

Male tourists, sometimes known as sexpats (expatriate + sex tourist), join online communities in which they share advice on destinations and, although it is not among the most common cases, there is the category of "girlfriend experience" which, in some cases, evolves into an emotional relationship.

General attitudes towards sex work are complex and often regarded as controversial. Many countries where tourists come from can have harsher attitudes towards sexual services. Often the men who travel seeking to pay for sex may do so because it is much harder to engage in sex work in their home countries. Furthermore, in some countries, such as Cambodia and Thailand, this practice is considered commonplace, and men who do not engage in commercial sex may be considered unusual by their peers.

Sociologists from the University of Leicester conducted a research study for the Economic and Social Research Council and End Child Prostitution and Trafficking campaign, which interviewed over 250 Caribbean sex tourists. Amongst their findings were:

- Preconceptions about race and gender influenced the tourist's opinions.
- Underdeveloped countries are considered culturally different, so in Western tourist's understanding, the exploitation or male domination of women is without consequence or stigma of that found in their home countries.

Despite a great deal of interest in sexual tourism amongst theorists, detailed studies of cultural attitude are rare, regardless of the increasing accessibility of group studies in the past three decades.

== Types ==
=== Gay sex tourism ===
The sex tourism industry offers a market for gay, bisexual and bi-curious tourists. Studies suggest that gay sex tourism has similar motivations to non-gay sex tourism. These studies suggest, "leisure activities and holidays have a particular significance for gay men, as they provide an opportunity for constructing, confirming and/or changing their sexual identity."

Popular gay sex tourism markets can be found in Bangkok, Gran Canaria, Ibiza, Sardinia, Sicily and Fire Island. Similar to heterosexual sex tourism markets, some arrangements may be monetary and others may not. Different places have different ways of identifying their interest in such arrangements. For example, in Rio de Janeiro, Brazil, gay sex tourism has become a popular niche hosting a racially diverse market. The workers there are called "Michês" and stand out by wearing bright blue towels and often work in saunas.

=== Adult-only resorts ===
Over recent years, adult-only sex resorts have become a popular alternative for travellers wanting to experience consensual sex abroad whilst avoiding the ethical issues of paid sexual activity. Those resorts can be characterised as safe, consensual spaces, and sexually positive nature, where all expressions of gender, orientation, and relationships are free of any pressure. These resorts largely occur in Mexico and the Caribbean. Certain establishments will be clothing-optional resorts, where travellers can meet and make use of "playrooms".

=== Child sex tourism ===
Some sex tourists travel in order to engage in sex with children. While it is criminal in most countries, this industry is believed to involve as many as 2 million children around the world. Thailand is considered to have the worst child sex trafficking record, followed closely by Brazil.

"Child sex tourists may not have a specific preference for children as sexual partners but take advantage of a situation in which children are made available to them for sexual exploitation. It is often the case that these people have travelled from a wealthier country (or a richer town or region within a country) to a less-developed destination, where poorer economic conditions, favourable exchange rates for the traveller and relative anonymity are key factors conditioning their behaviour and sex tourism."

In an effort to eradicate the practice, many countries have enacted laws that allow the prosecution of their citizens for child abuse that occurs outside their home country, even if it is not against the law in the country where the incident took place. This is evident in America, under the United States Protect Act. In the United Kingdom, the Sexual Offences Act 2003 allows for prosecution in British criminal courts of British citizens who commit sexual offences against children while traveling abroad; this legislation was used to prosecute Richard Huckle in 2016. In Ireland, the Criminal Law (Sexual Offences) Act 2017 gives worldwide jurisdiction to prosecutors for sexual offences committed against children outside the state, and was used to prosecute Kieran Creaven for sexual acts with a child and producing child pornography in The Philippines in 2021. The Code of Conduct for the Sexual Exploitation of Children in Travel and Tourism is an international organisation composed of members of the tourism industry and children's rights experts with the purpose to eradicate the practice of child sex tourism.

UNICEF notes that sexual activity is often seen as a private matter, making communities reluctant to act and intervene in cases of sexual exploitation. These attitudes make children far more vulnerable to sexual exploitation. Most exploitation of children takes place as a result of their absorption into the adult sex trade where they are exploited by local people and sex tourists. The Internet provides an efficient global networking tool for individuals to share information on destinations and procurement.

In cases involving children, the U.S. has relatively strict domestic laws that hold accountable any American citizen or permanent resident of the U.S. who travels abroad for the purpose of engaging in illicit conduct with a minor. As of 2009, sex tourism and human trafficking remain fast-growing industries.

== By region ==
=== Africa ===
While the media commonly associates sex tourism with Southeast Asia, Africa's tourism industry sees large numbers of sex tourists as well. With global tourism in Africa expanding over the years, government officials, businesses, and researchers have noticed an increase in sex tourism throughout the continent. The most common sex tourists are wealthy white men traveling from Europe and the United States with the intention of forming relations with African women. This is often the result of the fetishizing and exoticizing of Black bodies. While considered more rare, there is a growing rate of wealthy white women who are playing a more active role by seeking "beach boys."

Gay tourists are another common demographic of sex tourists traveling to Africa. Their primary destinations are coastal cities in South Africa because of the region's history in LGBTQ+ rights. Many businesses profit from gay tourists by leaning into what is known as "pink tourism."

The majority of individuals providing services in the sex tourism industry are women over eighteen, despite popular narratives that most of the industry is based on adolescents. Most of these women come from rural areas and are seeking economic opportunities in these cities. Globalized labor disproportionately affects young women, resulting in struggles for employment and livable wages. As a result of this inequality, many of these women have to enter this field as a means of survival.

=== Brazil ===
For a long time, Thailand was the sex tourism capital of the world, but following the 2004 Indian Ocean earthquake and tsunami Brazil quickly took over as the leading destination for sex tourists. Despite this, when discussing sex tourism and its effects on those involved in the transaction, including other locals, Thailand is still viewed as being the most affected, and it is by far the most discussed. As a result, places like Brazil and Africa are often overlooked, resulting in an unequal understanding of sex tourism as a whole and victims of sexual violence and exploitation being ignored.

When sex tourism is addressed by the Brazilian government, they often connect it to child sexual exploitation, thereby omitting many women and men from the discussion. Despite many researchers' findings suggesting that sex tourism occurs between consenting adults, many officials paint the narrative that it only occurs between a child and an adult tourist. Consequently, many campaigns have been launched throughout cities in Brazil to stop child sexual exploitation. For instance, Erica Lorraine Williams in 2013 talked about the campaign's run during Carnaval. Messages were left all around cities, including Salvador, Fortaleza, and Rio De Janeiro, warning people about the criminality of child sexual exploitation. These messages were even featured on T-shirts and placed on trash bags and flyers posted around the cities.

There are also some instances in which articles discussing specific instances of sex tourism are edited to fit the narrative of child exploitation. In some cases, the age of the individuals will be changed to support this idea of the “ideal victim,” which is a child. Children are viewed as more innocent, so when some type of violence or exploitation occurs against them, there is more sympathy. This results in violence against adults being more accepted because it isn't discussed when talking about sex tourism, and because adults aren't considered ideal for sympathy and change.

While most campaigns launched in Brazil are focused on ending child sexual exploitation in sex tourism, many scholars have pointed out that most children who are exploited are exploited by their family or by people within their own community. By only connecting child sexual abuse to tourists, the government prevents accountability from occurring and inadvertently prevents community abuse from being stopped.

== Analysis ==
=== Economic and policy implications ===
Sex tourism has implications for all nations involved. Economically, sex tourism is encouraged by the tourist sectors of destination countries. It draws wealthy individuals with the allure of cheap, unstigmatised sexual activities, and stimulates the economy of poorer nations. This line of sex work ensures a consistent flow of income into developing countries' economies.

In an article published by the University of Chicago, it is argued that the promotion of sex tourism caters to tourists by enticing racial and ethnic stereotypes. This in turn creates ethical and policy implications, as colonial and traditional attitudes reinforce inequality between the groups. The state plays a vital part in this interaction, as governments create financially motivated barriers when asked to formulate more progressive and ethical policy.

As discussed by Erica Lorraine Williams in 2013, Bahia's government often does very little about the country's growing sex tourism issue. Instead, they produce tourism advertisements that sexualize the experience of traveling to their country. Ultimately, while sex tourism is considered a social strain, it also expands the economy by profiting from the exploitation of the bodies of women of color for foreign money.

Sex work may yield higher wages than work in other sectors, and can encourage engagement with the industry for those seeking to achieve a much higher quality of life. This economic temptation can often lead to sexual exploitation of children. Young girls and adolescent women are some of the most common to be sold into slavery or transported across national borders to work in the commercial sex industry.

=== Colonialism ===
Sex tourism can perpetuate histories and ongoing narratives of colonialism. In Thailand, Bangkok’s red-light district, Thaniya Road, is frequented by 1.5 million Japanese men annually, seeking Thai sex workers. According to Jason Hung, "the encounter with poverty is seen as a primary factor that propels the financially disadvantaged and marginalized cohorts to work as commercial sex workers". Hence, beginning in the field of sex work is often a decision based upon legacies of colonialism, violence, and the global political economy.

== Opposition ==
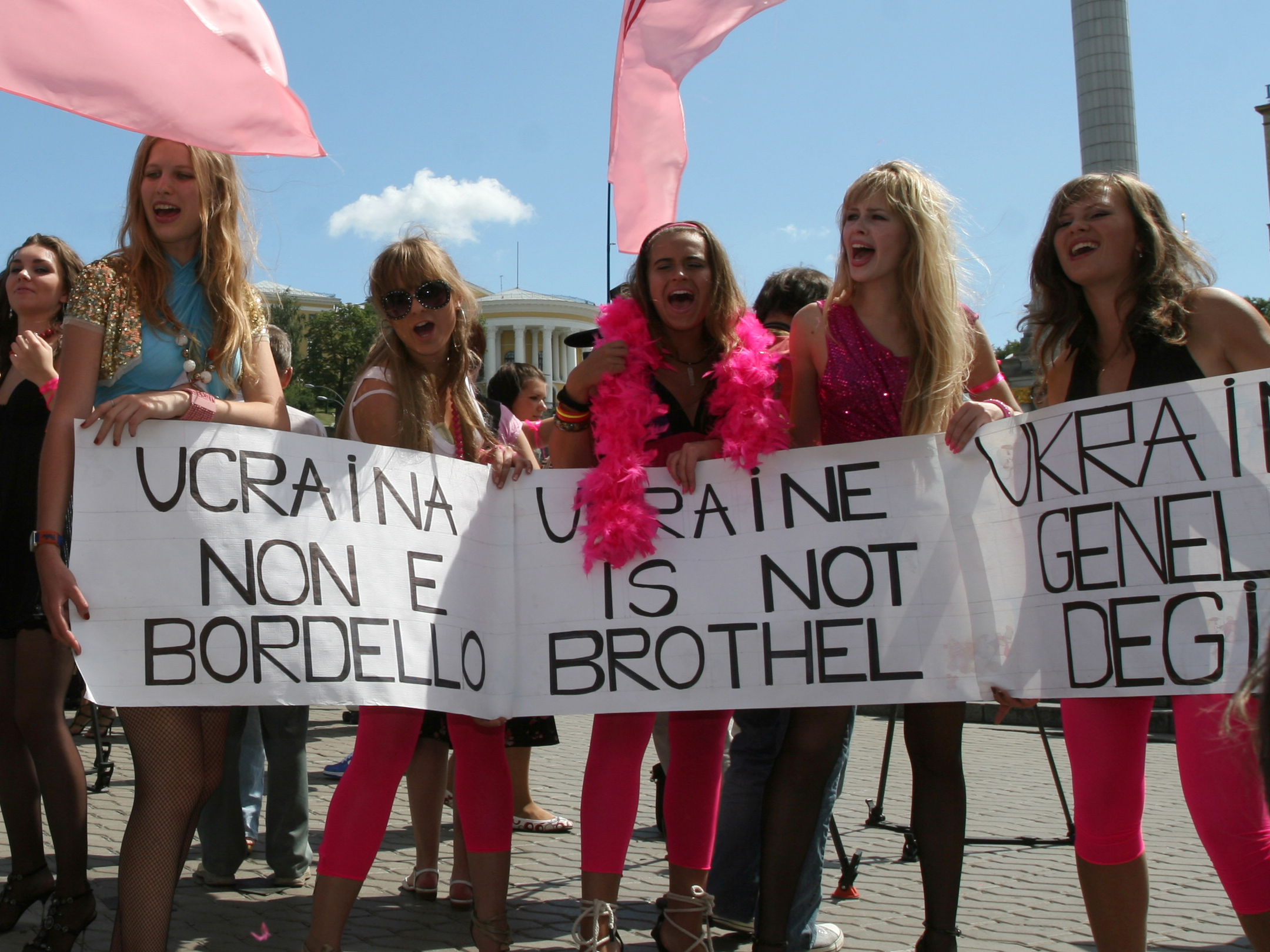
From the documentary Ukraine Is Not a Brothel. Feminist activist group Femen protest against the increase in sex tourism into Ukraine.

One of the primary sources of opposition to sex tourism is child sex tourism. This act is internationally defined as travel to have sex with a person under 18 years of age. An example of this would be when tourists from wealthy countries take advantage of legal prostitution, lower consent ages, and the lack of extradition laws in order to engage in sex with minors in foreign countries. Developed nations with more conservative views of sexuality can provide a steady stream of tourists who feed the sex tourism industry. Human rights organisations and governments argue that this pattern creates an incentive for trafficking of children and violation of children's human rights.

Oppositions to sex tourism also stem from concerns around the trafficking of women. The United Nations Office on Drugs and Crime targets the trafficking of women and children as a central concern in their approach to transnational crime. The United Nations Global Report on Trafficking in Persons states that women are "the vast majority" of human trafficking victims for sexual exploitation across the world. They also note that women make up a relatively large portion of human trafficking offenders—about 30% of convicted human traffickers are women. It can be seen that women who become involved in human trafficking were once victims of sex trafficking and sexual exploitation themselves.

These factors can all contribute to the debate on human rights and their relations with sex tourism. The sex tourism industry showcases a global view in sexual exploitation, and a lack of concern for the rights and dignity of sex workers. It can be argued that through the growing international porn industry, indicate a normalisation of prostitution and an increase in the exploitation of women.

== Prostitution by country ==
The legality of prostitution and enforcement of such laws varies considerably around the world.

Prostitution in North America

Prostitution in Central America and the Caribbean

Prostitution in South America

Prostitution in Europe

Prostitution in Africa

Prostitution in Asia

Prostitution in Oceania

Decriminalization - No criminal penalties for prostitution
Legalization - prostitution legal and regulated
Abolitionism - prostitution is legal, but organized activities such as brothels and pimping are illegal; prostitution is not regulated
Neo-abolitionism - illegal to buy sex and for 3rd party involvement, legal to sell sex
Prohibitionism - prostitution illegal
Legality varies with local laws

== See also ==
- Cuban jineterismo
- Female sex tourism
- Gigolo
- Male prostitution
- Male prostitution in the arts
- Prostitution by country
- Prostitution in India
- Prostitution in Germany
- Prostitution in the United Kingdom
- Prostitution in Ukraine
- Prostitution in Russia
- Prostitution law
- Sex trafficking
