= Heading South =

- Film poster
- French: Vers le sud
- Directed by: Laurent Cantet
- Screenplay by: Robin Campillo; Laurent Cantet
- Based on: La Chair du Maître by Dany Laferrière
- Produced by: Simon Arnal-Szlovak; Caroline Benjo; Carole Scotta
- Starring: Charlotte Rampling; Karen Young; Louise Portal; Ménothy Cesar
- Cinematography: Pierre Milon
- Edited by: Robin Campillo
- Distributed by: Haut et Court (France)
- Release dates: September 2005 (Venice); 25 January 2006 (France)
- Running time: 108 minutes
- Countries: France; Canada; Belgium
- Languages: French; English; Haitian Creole
- Budget: €5 million
- Box office: $2.4 million

Heading South (French: Vers le sud) is a 2005 French-Canadian-Belgian drama film directed by Laurent Cantet and based on three short stories by Dany Laferrière. It depicts the experiences of three middle-aged white women in the late 1970s, travelling to Haiti for the purposes of sexual tourism with young men. Their adventures (as seen in their eyes) are juxtaposed with class issues and the deteriorating political climate of Haiti at the time of Jean-Claude “Baby Doc” Duvalier. The women demonstrate different attitudes to the complex situation.

== Plot ==
Ellen (Charlotte Rampling), is a professor of French literature at Wellesley College in Boston who has spent six summers at a Haitian resort where local young men and teenagers providing sexual companionship are easy to find. Among other guests, Brenda (Karen Young), a stay-at-home wife from Savannah, Georgia, and Sue (Louise Portal), a warehouse manager from Montreal, feel lonely and ignored by middle-aged men back at home. They travelled to Haiti to enjoy a holiday of sun, surf, and sex with attractive teenagers to whom they are financially generous; complicating their friendship is the fact that Ellen and Brenda both live for the attention of Legba (Ménothy César). It is only after an episode of violence disrupts their vacation that their eyes are finally opened to the callousness of their hedonistic actions, the suffering of the Haitian people and the political climate.

== Cast ==
- Charlotte Rampling as Ellen
- Karen Young as Brenda
- Louise Portal as Sue
- Ménothy César as Legba
- Lys Ambroise as Albert
- Jackenson Pierre Olmo Diaz as Eddy
- Wilfried Paul as Neptune
- Michelet Cassis as Charlie
- Pierre-Jean Robert as Chico
- Jean Delinze Salomon as Jérémy
- Kettline Amy as Denise
- Daphné Destin as Lossita
- Guiteau Nestant as Frank
- Michelet Ulysse as Bob

== Accolades ==
- Nominated, Golden Lion, 2005 Venice Film Festival
- Won, Marcello Mastrioanni Award, 2005 Venice Film Festival
- Won, CinemAvvenire (Cinema For Peace) Award, 2005 Venice Film Festival

== See also ==
- Male prostitution
- Female sex tourism
- Sanky-panky
- sex worker
