= Big Sister (brothel) =

Defunct brothel in Prague

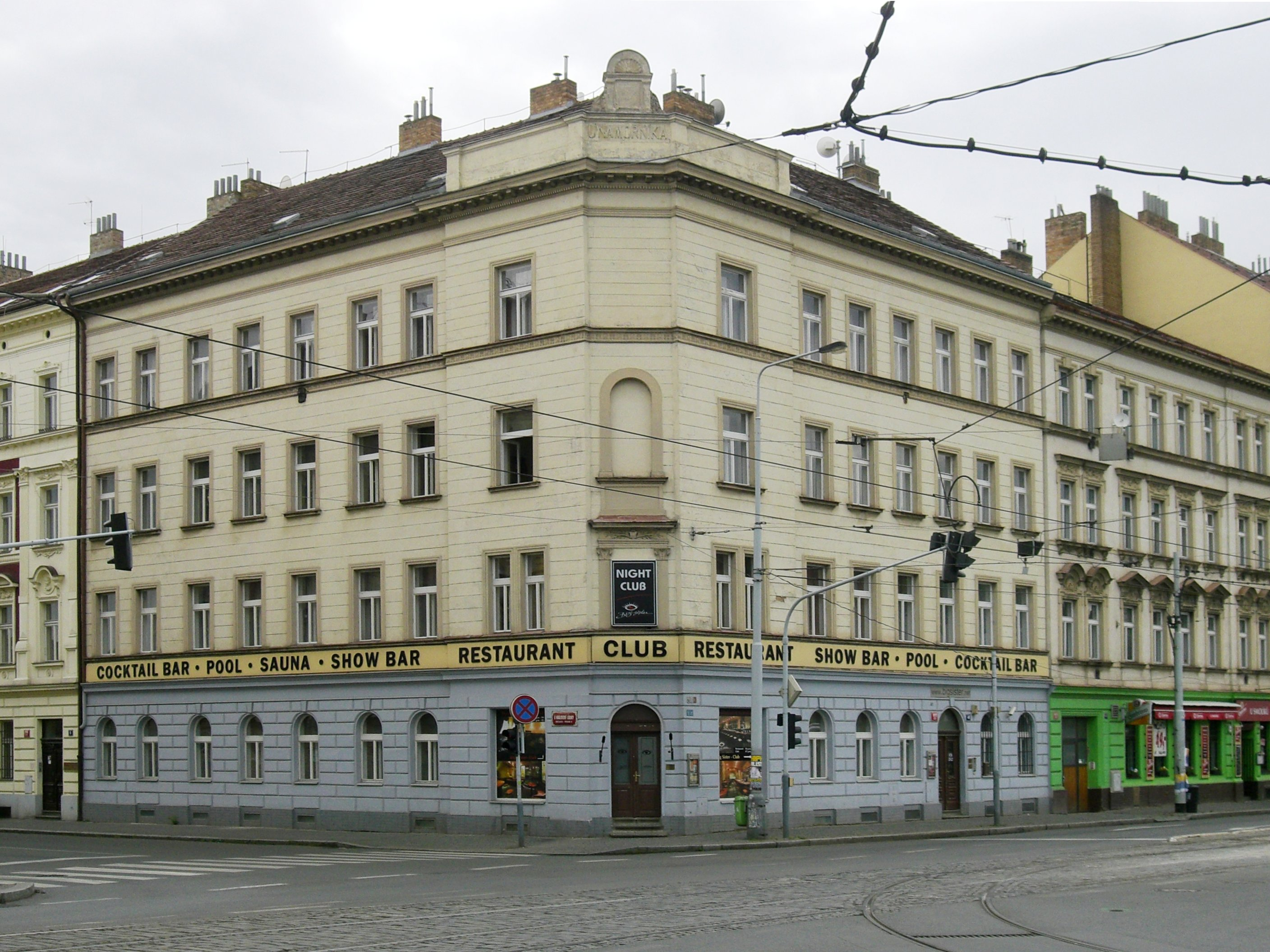
Building

Big Sister was a brothel in Prague, Czech Republic, and an online voyeuristic pay site. Operating from 2005 to 2010, it described itself as the only brothel where customers could use the women's services for free, subsidized by paying Internet viewers; live video and audio streams and archived videos of the activity in the brothel were available on the website for a fee. As well as these subscription fees, the brothel generated income from sales of DVDs of recorded footage of the women with the brothel's clients, as well as amateur couples that visited the building, and footage of the filming of adult productions that took place on site. The name of the club was a reference to the television series Big Brother, in which contestants live in a house with cameras in every room, recording their every action.

== History ==
Located at Nádražní 893/46 in the Smíchov district of Prague, Big Sister opened as a brothel in May 2004, and the Internet operation began in April 2005. It was established for about €5 million by two Austrian businessmen, one being Heribert Greinix. They had been active in the Prague night life for seven years and also own other Prague establishments, including the Prague sex club K5.

The start of the Internet operations in 2005 was followed by a heavy publicity campaign across Europe, leading to some 40 media reports in German, English, French, Czech, Italian and Russian, including reports by the largest TV stations in Germany and the largest newspapers in Germany and Switzerland. One angle of the company's advertising was the chance for women to see inside a brothel.

During the 2006 FIFA World Cup in Germany in the summer of 2006, the company undertook a marketing campaign, in association with Heat TV, in which they visited Munich, Leipzig, Hamburg and Cologne with their "love truck", a brothel on wheels with six prostitutes offering customers free sex in exchange for publication rights of the recorded video.

In June 2007, a series of online broadcast swingers nights were launched, on which prostitutes did not work and only couples and females were allowed. A free buffet and beverages were included for couples.

Big Sister closed in 2010. Another company tried to open a traditional brothel without cameras in the same location but closed after one year.

== Legal questions ==
Prostitution in the Czech Republic is allowed for persons over 18 years of age, but pimping and brothels are illegal according to Section 204 of the Criminal Code. It is disputed whether or not Big Sister was a brothel.

== Operation and equipment ==
The entrance fee for male customers was 500 Czech korunas (about $23) and entrance was free for female customers and couples. All customers were required to present identification papers, and sign a contract purchasing a DVD of their actions in the club, and at the same time selling the online and DVD distribution rights for the material. The length of each visit to a room with a prostitute was limited to one hour. Visiting couples whose sex acts were recorded received compensation of about €30. Subscription to the website was €30 per month, which included access to live streams, the video archive and a chat room; live video chat with the working women incurred an extra charge.

The women working in the brothel received a fixed salary and additional money per recorded sex act and per online show for the website subscribers, with average pay of about €3,000 per month. Fellatio and vaginal sex were almost always performed with condoms, and most women did not allow cunnilingus or kissing on the mouth. The majority of the women were Czechs or Slovaks, but some were from Brazil or Ghana.

The club was fitted with about 58 cameras, including some in the living quarters of the prostitutes. Three employees directed the cameras and select the audio/video streams to be broadcast and archived.

== In other media ==
Former European lightweight boxer René Weller attempted to promote his singing career by launching his new album in Big Sister on May 10, 2006.

In October 2006, scenes for Eli Roth's horror movie Hostel: Part II were shot in Big Sister, as described on his blog and the Big Sister site. On the date of the US premiere of the movie, 8 June 2007, an exclusive interview with Eli Roth was published on the Big Sister website.

In 2010, photographer Hana Jakrlova released Big Sister, a book of pictures she took in the club between 2006 and 2007.
