= American Gigolo =

1980 film by Paul Schrader

- Theatrical release poster
- Directed by: Paul Schrader
- Written by: Paul Schrader
- Produced by: Jerry Bruckheimer
- Starring: Richard Gere; Lauren Hutton
- Cinematography: John Bailey
- Edited by: Richard Halsey
- Music by: Giorgio Moroder
- Production company: Paramount Pictures
- Distributed by: Paramount Pictures
- Release date: February 1, 1980
- Running time: 117 minutes
- Country: United States
- Language: English
- Budget: $5 million
- Box office: $52.7 million

American Gigolo is a 1980 American neo-noir crime drama thriller film written and directed by Paul Schrader, and starring Richard Gere and Lauren Hutton. It tells the story of a high-priced escort in Los Angeles (Gere) who becomes romantically involved with a prominent politician's wife (Hutton), while simultaneously becoming the prime suspect in a murder case.

American Gigolo was released by Paramount Pictures on February 1, 1980. The film established Gere as a leading man, and was one of the first mainstream Hollywood films to include frontal male nudity from its main star. It is marked by its Golden Globe–nominated musical score, composed by Giorgio Moroder, and number-one single "Call Me" by Blondie. Schrader considers it one of four similar films, which he calls "double bookends": Taxi Driver, bookended by Light Sleeper, and American Gigolo bookended by The Walker.

== Plot ==
Julian Kaye is a high-end male escort in Los Angeles whose clientele consists primarily of upper-class, older women. His profession supports—and requires—an expensive taste in material possessions, affording him tailored clothing, a luxuriously furnished apartment in Westwood, and a Mercedes-Benz convertible. Although he takes pride in his work, his profession leaves him emotionally detached and unable to form meaningful romantic relationships.

Julian's procurer, Anne, sends him on an assignment with a wealthy widow, Mrs. Dobrun, vacationing at the Beverly Hills Hotel. Afterward, he goes to the hotel's bar and approaches Michelle Stratton, believing her to be a potential client. Although the two are mutually attracted to each other, Michelle reveals that she is the wife of prominent U.S. Senator Charles Stratton and that she knows that Julian is a male escort. Seeking to avoid further entanglement, Julian leaves.

Leon, a pimp with whom Julian occasionally collaborates on high-paying assignments, asks him to substitute for another escort on a job in Palm Springs. There, wealthy financier Mr. Rheiman instructs Julian to engage in sadomasochistic sex with his wife, Judy, while he watches. The following day, Julian chides Leon for sending him on a "rough trick" and reiterates his refusal to accept kink or same-sex assignments. Leon warns Julian that the wealthy, older women he serves will eventually discard him without hesitation.

At midnight, Michelle seeks Julian out at his apartment, where the two have sex. Although Michelle offers to pay for his services, Julian declines. The two begin a romantic relationship, during which Julian encourages Michelle to reconsider her loveless marriage, while Michelle provides him with the emotional intimacy he has long lacked.

Julian soon learns that Judy Rheiman has been murdered at her home, prompting LAPD Detective Sunday to repeatedly question him and uncover inconsistencies in his account. Although Julian was with another client, Lisa Williams, on the night of the murder, she refuses to provide him with an alibi in order to protect her marriage. As Julian becomes the prime suspect, Senator Stratton warns him to end his relationship with Michelle, even offering him money to do so. Julian refuses, but Stratton nevertheless orders Michelle to leave for Rome until his election campaign is over.

Convinced that he is being framed, Julian frantically searches his apartment before discovering Judy's stolen jewelry hidden in his Mercedes. As he goes into hiding, his carefully cultivated lifestyle rapidly unravels, and Anne refuses to help him after he misses an important assignment. Though Michelle offers her support, Julian urges her to leave him for her own safety.

Julian concludes that Leon and Mr. Rheiman are framing him and that another of Leon's escorts committed the murder. He goes to Leon's apartment with the jewelry to confront him, but Leon refuses to help. Enraged, Julian pushes him from the apartment balcony. Immediately regretting his actions, Julian attempts to save Leon, but he falls to his death.

With no one left to corroborate his claims, Julian is jailed to await a highly publicized trial for Judy's murder. Against Julian's advice, however, Michelle provides him with an alibi by telling police that she was with him on the night of the murder, sacrificing her marriage and reputation in the process. During a jail visit, Julian and Michelle profess their love for each other.

== Cast ==
- Richard Gere as Julian Kaye
- Lauren Hutton as Michelle Stratton
- Héctor Elizondo as Detective Sunday
- Nina van Pallandt as Anne
- Bill Duke as Leon
- Frances Bergen as Mrs. Laudner
- Carol Bruce as Mrs. Sloan
- K Callan as Lisa Williams
- Carole Cook as Mrs. Dobrun
- David Cryer as Lieutenant Curtis
- Richard Derr as Mr. Williams
- Robert Wightman as Floyd Wicker
- Tom Stewart as Mr. Rheiman
- Brian Davies as Senator Charles Stratton
- Patty Carr as Judy Rheiman

== Production ==
=== Development ===
Paul Schrader conceived the idea for the film while teaching screenwriting in UCLA's film and television department. The script was one of five screenplays Schrader wrote in 1976. Comparing the film's protagonist with that of his earlier screenplay Taxi Driver, Schrader said, "The character in 'Taxi Driver' was compulsively nonsexual. The character in 'American Gigolo' is compulsively sexual. He is a man who receives his identity by giving sexual pleasure but has no concept of receiving sexual pleasure." Schrader later re-visited many of the themes of American Gigolo in his 2007 film The Walker and says the idea for that film came about while wondering what would have become of the Julian Kaye character.

=== Casting ===
John Travolta was originally attached to the lead role, with his casting announced by the Los Angeles Times in January 1978. Travolta was provided a wardrobe by Giorgio Armani and appeared in a photo spread for the trade publication Variety announcing his participation. The following year, however, Travolta withdrew from the production following his mother's death and father's illness. Paramount CEO Barry Diller subsequently offered the role of Julian Kaye to Christopher Reeve, who declined a $1 million offer. Chevy Chase was also reportedly offered the role but declined.

Schrader then turned to his first choice, Richard Gere, who accepted the role two weeks before shooting began. American Gigolo was one of several films in which Gere was cast in a role previously offered to Travolta; this had first occurred with Days of Heaven (1978) and later recurred with An Officer and a Gentleman (1982) and Chicago (2002). Gere later said that he was drawn to the character partly because of the film's gay subtext and the opportunity to portray a lifestyle unfamiliar to him. To prepare Gere for the role, Schrader screened films starring French actor Alain Delon, including Purple Noon, encouraging Gere to emulate Delon's perceived ability to make a room "a better place because he has just entered it". Gere likewise cited Delon as an influence on his portrayal of seductive characters.

Meryl Streep was offered the role of Michelle Stratton but declined because she disliked the film's tone. Glenn Close also auditioned for a role while Travolta was still attached to the production. By the time Gere was cast, Lauren Hutton had already replaced Julie Christie as Michelle.

=== Filming ===
Filming began on February 13, 1979, and continued through April.

Gere's brief nude scenes marked the first time a major Hollywood actor appeared frontally nude in a film. According to Gere, the nudity was not included in the original screenplay but arose naturally during filming. He recalled feeling "vulnerable", while adding that he believed nudity was "different for men than women".

According to Schrader, the composition and dialogue of the final scene are meant to pay homage to Robert Bresson's 1959 film Pickpocket. Schrader later provided an introduction for the Criterion Collection DVD release of Pickpocket, explaining that he "lifted the ending" of the film for Julian Kaye and describing it as "a grace note as unwarranted as Christ's promise to the thief on the cross".

The film has been widely credited with establishing Armani brand in Hollywood, with the Italian fashion house's clothes featured prominently in Julian's wardrobe. When Gere replaced Travolta in the lead role, Armani's team had to produce a new wardrobe because Travolta was several inches taller than Gere.

== Soundtrack ==
The film's synth-pop musical score was composed by Giorgio Moroder, who had previously won the Academy Award for Best Original Score for Midnight Express (1978). With Blondie singer Debbie Harry, Moroder also co-wrote and produced the film's main theme song, "Call Me", which was recorded by the band in New York City. A rearranged version of the song plays during the film's opening sequence, as Julian drives along the Pacific Coast Highway.

For his work on American Gigolo, Moroder received a nomination for the Golden Globe Award for Best Original Score. Meanwhile, "Call Me" became an international critical and commercial success, reaching number one in several countries, including the United States and the United Kingdom, and becoming the best-selling single of 1980 in the United States. Moroder and Harry jointly received a nomination for the Golden Globe Award for Best Original Song for "Call Me", while Blondie were nominated for a Grammy Award for Best Rock Performance by a Duo or Group with Vocal. In 2004, the song was ranked number 289 on Rolling Stone's 500 Greatest Songs of All Time.

== Reception ==
=== Box office ===
American Gigolo opened theatrically in the United States on February 1, 1980, in 570 theaters. It debuted at number one at the box office, grossing $3.56 million during its opening weekend. The film was a box office success, ultimately grossing $52.7 million worldwide against a budget of $5 million.

=== Critical response ===
The film received generally mixed to positive reviews. On review aggregator Rotten Tomatoes, the film received an approval rating of 70% based on 30 reviews, with an average rating of 6.6/10. The site's critical consensus reads, "While Paul Schrader's clinical direction and Richard Gere's muted performance don't stir much passion, American Gigolo succeeds as a stylish character study." On Metacritic, the film has a weighted average score of 57 out of 100 based on 34 critics, indicating "mixed or average" reviews.

Roger Ebert gave the film 3.5 stars out of 4, writing, "The whole movie has a winning sadness about it; take away the story's sensational aspects and what you have is a study in loneliness." Gene Siskel of the Chicago Tribune also awarded 3.5 stars out of 4 and called it "an honest, compelling drama that sheds a little light in some beguilingly dark places." Vincent Canby of The New York Times wrote in a negative review that writer-director Schrader "is awfully good at establishing inarticulate, unknowing, self-deluding characters, but he's much less effective when it comes to shepherding these characters through the contingencies of the melodrama that is supposed to ennoble them or, at least, to reveal their unsuspected moral resources."

Variety faulted the film for an "evasiveness at its core", finding a "moral and emotional ambivalence" in Gere's character "which makes caring about his predicament and ultimate fate difficult." Charles Champlin of the Los Angeles Times was also negative, calling the film "such an improbable tissue of fantasies and dime-novel borrowings that from moment to moment it seems to be making fun of itself, although the joke is disguised perfectly." Roger Angell of The New Yorker wrote that the film "presents a humorless, Penthouse kind of sex, all dolled up with expensive 'real' settings, foreign cars, hi-fi sets, and designer clothes, but barely alive at its glum, soft core."

== Television series ==
The film was adapted into a television series starring Jon Bernthal as Julian Kaye. It premiered on Showtime on September 11, 2022. In January 2023, the series was canceled after one season.

== See also ==
- Male sex work in popular culture
- Female sex tourism
- Romantic Noy
