= Deuce Bigalow =

Deuce Bigalow may refer to

- Deuce Bigalow: Male Gigolo, a 1999 film starring Rob Schneider
- Deuce Bigalow: European Gigolo, its 2005 sequel

== See also ==
- Bigelow (disambiguation)
