= Gigolo =

Male escort or paid companion

Occupation
- Names: Male escort, call boy
- Occupation type: Male prostitute
- Activity sectors: Sex industry

Description
- Fields of employment: Sex worker
- Related jobs: Stripper, porn actor, sugar dating

A gigolo (/ˈdʒɪɡəloʊ, ˈʒɪɡ-/ JIG-ə-loh, ZHIG-) is a male escort hired by a woman for sex or companionship. The dated usage of the term referred to a man paid by a woman to be her dancing partner.

== Etymology ==
The word gigolo may be traced to a first usage in English as a neologism during the 1920s as a back-formation from gigolette, a French word for a woman hired as a dancing partner. Both gigolo and gigolette were first recorded in French in the mid 19th century, referring to dance club denizens in Montmartre paid to dance with, and sometimes have sex with, unaccompanied male visitors. In the late 19th century, particularly after the scandalous murder case known in Paris as the Pranzini affair, the term gigolo took on connotations of the exotic, foreign male whose company and affections could be purchased by well-to-do French women.

== Social role ==
The term gigolo usually implies a man who adopts a lifestyle consisting of a number of such relationships serially, rather than having other means of support.

A gigolo is paid by a woman to have sex with her or to spend time with her. As a sex worker and escort, he may also accompany her to social engagements. It can also denote a younger man who is employed by an older woman in exchange for sex and companionship. The dated usage of the term referred to a man paid by a woman to be her dancing partner.

In its earliest modern sense the gigolo was a paid companion and dancing partner for women. As dance halls and the tango became popular in early twentieth-century Europe, some establishments employed men to dance with unaccompanied female patrons, and the word came to denote a man who worked as a paid escort for women. Alongside any sexual element, the role centred on attention, manners and social presence as an escort and companion.

Commentators have described a growing contemporary market of women who pay men for companionship and intimacy. A 2012 ABC News report profiled women who said they were willing to pay for male companionship and sex. A content analysis of male escort websites across dozens of countries found that roughly one in ten listings were aimed specifically at female clients, which the authors described as an emerging market often overlooked in research and public discussion.

Related forms of women paying for male companionship have been studied under other labels, including "romance tourism", a term coined by Deborah Pruitt and Suzanne LaFont for relationships between female tourists and local men, and female sex tourism.

== In popular culture ==
=== Films ===
- Gigolo (1926) – American silent romance drama film produced by Cecil B. DeMille
- Just a Gigolo (1931) – American romantic comedy directed by Jack Conway, starring William Haines, Irene Purcell, C. Aubrey Smith and Ray Milland
- Evenings for Sale (1932) – American romantic comedy, starring Herbert Marshall, Sari Maritza, Charlie Ruggles and Mary Boland
- Sunset Boulevard (1950) – American film noir co-written and directed by Billy Wilder, starring William Holden and Gloria Swanson
- Female on the Beach (1955) – American crime-drama film directed by Joseph Pevney, starring Joan Crawford and Jeff Chandler
- The Gigolo (1960) – French romantic drama film written and directed by Jacques Deray. It is loosely based on the novel Le Gigolo written by Jacques Robert.
- Breakfast at Tiffany's (1961) – American romantic comedy starring Audrey Hepburn and George Peppard
- Just a Gigolo (1978) – West German film directed by David Hemmings and starring David Bowie
- American Gigolo (1980) – American romantic crime film written and directed by Paul Schrader, and starring Richard Gere, Lauren Hutton & Hector Elizondo
- Galactic Gigolo (1987) – American science-fiction comedy film directed by Gorman Bechard
- Deuce Bigalow: Male Gigolo (1999) – American sex comedy film starring Rob Schneider, followed by the 2005 sequel Deuce Bigalow: European Gigolo
- The Roman Spring of Mrs. Stone (2003) – American television film remake of the 1961 film of the same name. Directed by Robert Allan Ackerman, it stars Helen Mirren and Brian Dennehy
- The Gigolos (2005) – British comedy film directed by Richard Bracewell, starring Sacha Tarter, Ben Willbond, and Susannah York
- A French Gigolo (2008) – French drama film directed by Josiane Balasko and starring Nathalie Baye. It was based on the novel "Cliente" by Josiane Balasko
- Spread (2009) – American sex comedy film directed by David Mackenzie, starring Ashton Kutcher and Anne Heche. It was also released as L.A. Gigolo
- Fading Gigolo (2013) – American comedy film directed, written by, and starring John Turturro, co-starring Woody Allen, Sharon Stone & Sofia Vergara
- The Gigolo (Chinese: 鴨王) (2015) – Hong Kong erotic drama film directed and written by Au Cheuk-man and starring Dominic Ho and Candy Yuen, followed by the 2016 sequel The Gigolo 2 (Chinese: 鴨王2)
- Good Luck to You, Leo Grande (2022) – Directed by Sophie Hyde and written by Katy Brand. Stars Emma Thompson and Daryl McCormack.

=== Music ===
- "I'm a Gigolo" – 1929 Broadway show tune by Cole Porter, written for the revue Wake Up and Dream
- "Just a Gigolo" – adapted by Irving Caesar in 1929 from the Austrian tango "Schöner Gigolo, armer Gigolo"; paired as a medley with "I Ain't Got Nobody" by Louis Prima in 1956
- "The Gigolo" – 1966 album by jazz trumpeter Lee Morgan
- “Gigolo Aunt” – 1970 song by Syd Barrett
- "Minstrel Gigolo" – 1979 song by Christopher Cross
- "Gigolo" – 1981 dance single by Mary Wells
- "Gigolo" – 1982 song by Meiko Nakahara
- "Gigolos Get Lonely Too" – 1983 song by The Time
- "Gigolo" – 1987 single by The Damned
- "Gigolo" – 1991 song by Liz Phair later rerecorded as "Can't Get Out of What I'm Into"
- "American Gigolo" – 2002 song by Weezer
- "Gigolo" – 2003 song by Nick Cannon featuring R. Kelly
- "Gigolo" – 2006 song by Greek singer Helena Paparizou
- "Buffalo Stance" – 1988 song by Neneh Cherry
- "Gigolo" – 2008 song by Nicolae Guță
- "gigolo" – 2025 song by bbno$

=== TV series ===
- Just a Gigolo (1993) – British sitcom starring Tony Slattery
- Absolutely Fabulous, TV episode "Sex", (1995) – British sitcom starring Jennifer Saunders and Joanna Lumley
- Hung (2009 – 2011) American comedy-drama about a high-school basketball coach who is short on cash
- Gigolos (2011 – 2016) – American reality television series about the lives of five male escorts in Las Vegas
- American Gigolo (2022) – Romance series starring Jon Bernthal

=== Novels ===
- Hold Back the Dawn (1940) by Ketti Frings
- The Roman Spring of Mrs. Stone (1950) by Tennessee Williams
- Breakfast at Tiffany's (1958) by Truman Capote
- Le Gigolo (1959) by Jacques Robert
- Cliente (2004) by Josiane Balasko

== See also ==
- Cicisbeo
- Escort agency
- Female sex tourism
- Male prostitution
- Male prostitution in the arts
- Prostitution
