= Mandragora (film) =

1997 film from Wiktor Grodecki

- Directed by: Wiktor Grodecki
- Written by: Wiktor Grodecki; David Švec
- Starring: Miroslav Čáslavka; David Švec; Pavel Skřípal
- Release date: 1997
- Language: Czech

Mandragora is a 1997 film by Polish director Wiktor Grodecki about the mental and physical decline of a 15-year-old boy who runs away from his seemingly distanced father to Prague, where he becomes a victim of the drug and sex scene.

The film is the last of Grodecki's trilogy of films about male prostitution, the other two being Not Angels But Angels and Body Without Soul.

== Cast ==
- Miroslav Čáslavka as Marek
- David Švec as David
- Pavel Skřípal as Honza
- Kostas Zerdolaglu as Krysa
- Miroslav Breu as Libor
- Jiří Kodeš as Father
- Karel Polišenský as Sascha
- Richard Toth as George
- Jiří Pachman as Pan Franta
- Pavel Kočí as Rudy
- Jitka Smutná as Krysa's Wife

Other cast members include; Jiří Kaftan, Břetislav Farský, Michell Turchetti, and Tomáš Petrák.
