= Body Without Soul =

1996 film by Wiktor Grodecki

Body Without Soul Tělo bez duše
- Directed by: Wiktor Grodecki
- Written by: Wiktor Grodecki
- Release date: November 9, 1996
- Running time: 94 mn.
- Country: Czech Republic
- Language: Czech

Body Without Soul (Czech: Tělo bez duše) is a 1996 documentary film about a number of underage 14- to 17-year-old boys in Prague who were being sold and abused as child prostitutes. The creator of the documentary, Wiktor Grodecki, interviews the boys about their lives and how they became victims of sex trafficking. The film explores their hopes and fears, and the boys talk about their bodies and souls, money, their sexual orientation, AIDS, their dreams, and death.

The film is the second of Grodecki's three films about male prostitution, the others being Not Angels But Angels (1994) and Mandragora (1997).
