= Wiktor Grodecki =

Polish film director, screenwriter and producer known

Wiktor Grodecki (born 25 February 1960 in Warsaw) is a Polish film director, screenwriter and producer known for Mandragora (five main prizes at Geneva "Stars Of Tomorrow" film festival in Switzerland in 1997 and Audience Choice Award at Palm Springs Intl Film Fest, USA 1998) as well as Insatiability - an adaptation of the eponymous novel by Stanisław Ignacy Witkiewicz - which was awarded Best Indie Director prize by SAG in USA in 2004.

== Biography ==
Grodecki studied in the Film Direction faculty at the National Film School in Łódź under the supervision of Wojciech Jerzy Has. The first step of his international career was directing the 1985 movie Him, which was produced by the University of Minnesota Film Society in collaboration with producer Albert Milgrom.

In 1994 he made a documentary film about male child prostitution in the Czech republic, Not Angels But Angels, followed by another one on the same theme, Body Without Soul. The two documentaries feature graphic, sexually explicit footage of underage minors and the dissection of a corpse shot on location in Prague.

In 1997, he made Mandragora, which is a dramatic story about a young man exploring the world of prostitution, drugs and AIDS. The film won many awards and was seen by Václav Havel, who wrote a letter to congratulate Grodecki personally. The letter from Havel praising Grodecki was published by the Czech newspaper Mlada Fronta Dnes.

In 2004 Grodecki filmed Insatiability based on the eponymous novel by Stanisław Ignacy Witkiewicz (commonly known as Witkacy). The film starred Cezary Pazura in three different roles (Zypcio's Father, his seducer Tengier and his commander Kocmoluchowicz). Insatiability premiered at the Berlin International Film Festival in 2004 (in the official section: Panorama Special), where it received excellent reviews. In Los Angeles, the Screen Actors Guild of America awarded Grodecki the SAG Best Indie Director Award for Insatiability (2004).

== Filmography ==
=== Screenwriter ===
- 1984: Him
- 1994: Not Angels But Angels
- 1996: Body Without Soul
- 1997: Mandragora
- 2000: Inferno
- 2003: Nienasycenie
- 2011: The Soul of the Murdered Kingdom
- 2012: Forefathers' Eve
- 2013: Beefcake

=== Director ===
- 1981: Nie brooklinski most
- 1981: Portret artysty z czasów młodości
- 1981: Już tylko tyle
- 1982: Nagi przyszedlem
- 1984: Him
- 1994: Not Angels But Angels
- 1996: Body Without Soul
- 1997: Mandragora
- 1999: Ich wünsch Dir Liebe
- 2000: Inferno
- 2003-2005: Czego się boją faceci, czyli seks w mniejszym mieście, Season 1, Episodes 4-13
- 2003: Nienasycenie
- 2011: The Soul of the Murdered Kingdom (Pre-Production)

=== Editor ===
- 1994: Nocny pociąg do Wenecji
- 1997: Mandragora
- 2000: Inferno

== See also ==
- Cinema of Poland
- List of Polish language films
