= Not Angels But Angels =

1994 film by Wiktor Grodecki

- Directed by: Wiktor Grodecki
- Written by: Wiktor Grodecki
- Cinematography: Vladimír Holomek
- Edited by: Wiktor Grodecki
- Release date: 1994
- Running time: 80 minutes
- Country: Czech Republic
- Languages: English, Czech

Not Angels But Angels is a 1994 documentary film about teenage boys and young men in Prague working as prostitutes, primarily there and also in other European cities in the region. The creator of the documentary, Wiktor Grodecki interviews the hustlers, who give ages ranging from 14 to 20 years, to find out more about their lives and how they came to make a living by selling sex. The film explores their hopes and fears, what they hope to be doing in the future, and coping with the possibility of being infected with HIV. The film also presents comments by a man who arranges liaisons between tourists and young male hustlers in the Prague central train station. The conversations are in a mix of Czech with English subtitles, and English.

The film is the first of Grodecki's trilogy of films about male prostitution, the other two being Body Without Soul and Mandragora, and was shown at the London Lesbian and Gay Film Festival in 1995.
