= Female sex tourism =

Tourism involving women who travel to engage in sexual activities

Map of female sex tourism Countries of origin: Australia, Austria, Belgium, Canada, Denmark, Finland, France, Germany, Ireland, Japan, Netherlands, New Zealand, Norway, Slovenia, Sweden, United States, UK. Countries of destination: Albania, Bulgaria, Cambodia, Costa Rica, Croatia, Cuba, Ecuador, Greece, Haiti, Indonesia, Italy, Jamaica, Kenya, Morocco, Panama, Peru, Philippines, Portugal, Romania, Serbia, Spain, Thailand, Turkey, Vietnam.

Female sex tourism is sex tourism by women who travel intending to engage in sexual activities with one or more marginalized individuals or groups, including male sex workers. Female sex tourists may seek aspects of the sexual relationship not typically shared by male sex tourists, such as the exploitation of romance and intimacy among the disadvantaged group. The incidence of female sex tourism is lower than male sex tourism, and the low number of female sex tourists makes it difficult to research this phenomenon, which has been described as "poorly understood".

Female sex tourism occurs in diverse regions of the world. Africa, the Caribbean, and southern Europe appear to be preferred destinations for female sex tourists, but some other regions with many unemployed or underemployed victims are also becoming popular. Recent research has suggested that some female sex tourists do not seek male sex workers. A 2018 study found that Australian female sex tourists were more likely to seek female prostitutes than male prostitutes.

Female sex tourists can be grouped into three types:

- Traditional sex tourists, who have similar characteristics and motives as male sex tourists.
- Situational sex tourists, who do not intentionally put themselves in a sex tourist position, but get themselves involved in a sexual encounter with locals. Situational sex tourists may fall into the category of either being businesswomen, students, women in overseas conferences or other women who have different agendas that are non-sexual.
- Romance tourists, who plan to fulfill their travel with romantic experiences that they cannot experience in their native country due to their stigma.

With this movement of different populations to different countries, problems concerning health increase, especially ailments involving sexually transmitted infections (STIs) and HIV/AIDS. Some women involved with sex tourism do not use barrier contraceptives during the majority of their visit, leaving them and those they have sex with unprotected against STIs.

== Terminology ==
There is an ongoing debate on terminology regarding female sex tourism. Pruitt and LaFont argue that the term female sex tourism is not representative of the relationship that female tourists have with local men. They argue that female sex tourism oversimplifies the motives of these women and that romance tourism explains the complex nature of what these women are engaging themselves in while involved in romance tours. They also propose that while traditional male sex tourism "serves to perpetuate gender roles and reinforce power relations of male dominance and female subordination", female romance tourism in Jamaica "provides an arena for change".

Scholars such as Klaus de Albuquerque counter that the term romance tourism overcomplicates what the motives of sex tourists are. de Albuquerque stated that concepts like "romance tourism" are only representative of small niches, like that of Jamaica and its cultural beliefs. Through his research, he concludes that the majority of female sex tourists are solely touring for physical encounters and not romance. He also says that the "tourist and beach boys may define their relationships as one of romance, [but] in reality, the relationship is one of prostitution".

Researcher Jacqueline Sanchez-Taylor argues that the term female sex tourism and even the term romance tourism undermine what is actually happening in these situations. She compares female and male sex tourism and shows how each relationship is based upon sexual-economic relationships. She also explores whether or not female sex tourism is based on romance and if there is some sort of sexual-economic relationship occurring between the two parties. She added, "The fact that parallels between male and female sex tourism are widely overlooked reflects and reproduces weaknesses in existing theoretical and commonsense understandings of gendered power...[and] sex tourism."

== Destinations ==
Female sex tourists visit Africa (The Gambia, Kenya, Morocco), the Caribbean (Jamaica, The Bahamas, Cuba, and Barbados), and Southern Europe (Greece, Italy, Spain, Portugal, and Croatia). Other destinations include parts of Latin America such as Ecuador, Peru and other places such as Turkey, Thailand, and Fiji. Bali in Indonesia is a known destination where women from Japan and Australia engage in sex tourism with male locals. A survey from 2009 conducted by Wanjohi Kibicho in Malindi Kenya from the book Sex Tourism in Africa: Kenya's Booming Industry, found that out of the sex tourists surveyed, 61% were between the ages of 46–50, 31–35 (3%) being the youngest age bracket. Of the background of these women surveyed 22% were from Germany, 19% from Italy, and 15% from the Netherlands. In addition 71% of those surveyed were revisiting the destination. In gauging the reasoning for sex touring, Kibicho summarizes that women who feel rejected by men in the developed countries for being "overweight and older" find that in Kenya this is suddenly reversed. There they are "romanced", appreciated and "loved" by men.

== Motives for travel ==
=== Traditional sex tourism ===
Traditional female sex tourists have the same intentions as their male counterparts, and travel to foreign countries that have lower wages, and take advantage of cheap prostitution at a level unaffordable in their own countries.

=== Situational sex tourism ===
Situational sex tourists differ from traditional sex tourists by considering their sexual activities with the sex worker as an added amenity to their original motive to travel.

The majority of situational sex tourists are first-time tourists who do not plan on being involved with local men, and who become involved in romantic relationships rather than having exclusively physical relationships with sex workers.

Situational sex tourism occurs when foreign tourists are attracted by male sex workers, known as beach boys in the Caribbean or gringueros in Costa Rica. According to the tourists, they are usually attracted by the exotic appeal that these men possess. This appeal can result from the ethnic differences between the sex worker and the sex tourist or the foreign lifestyle that the local men live. Women who have sexual encounters with such men are typically middle-aged and of European ethnicities.

The sex workers will often approach women who they deem vulnerable for various reasons, such as weight or age.

=== Romance tourism ===
Romance tourism refers to a different relationship than female sex tourism.

The concept of romance tourism came from researchers' observations in Jamaica; it appeared to them that the female tourist and local males viewed their relationship with each other solely based on romance and courtship rather than lust and monetary value. Romance tourism is an issue of gender identification: "gender identity is a relational construct, the Western women who seek to break from conventional roles require a different kind of relationship with men in order to realize a new gender identity". With increasing independence and financial self-reliance, women are able to travel, showing their independence from men of their culture, "female tourists have the opportunity to explore new gender behavior".

== Sex workers ==
=== Background and intentions ===
Male sex workers have more freedom and security than female sex workers do because in most of the cases males are not confined to a brothel or a pimp and are not generally physically abused by their clients.

Similar to the sex tourists, sex workers have their own intentions. Just as some Western women may consider the local men exotic, the local men may consider Western women to be exotic. Popular characteristics that appeal to a majority of sex workers are women with blonde hair and light colored eyes. Some sex workers will target this type of exotic woman for their own personal pleasure with no guarantee of monetary gain.

On the other side of the spectrum, most sex workers have the intention of making some form of monetary gain. Such a sex worker typically profiles tourists in order to maximize potential payouts. While profiling he will look for older women, over the age of forty or young, overweight women. The sex worker considers these women vulnerable and will play on their vulnerability to get the tourists to obtain feelings for the sex worker. Once the tourist and sex worker obtain a relationship, the sex worker finds it easier for them to engage in a monetary exchange.

=== Defined by the tourist ===
Romance tourists do not label their sex workers "prostitutes". The local men and the tourists understand their roles in the relationship. The primary difference in definition of a local man to a romance tourist and a local man to a sex tourist is the emphasis the romance tourist places on passion instead of a transaction of goods or money for sexual favors.

== Health risks ==
The rate of sexually transmitted infections, including HIV/AIDS, may be relatively high in some countries which are popular destinations for female sex tourism, particularly in comparison to the home countries of many sex tourists. Little or no research has been done into the transmission rates of HIV and other STDs pertaining to sex tourism. Neither has there been reliable research done into whether or not condom use is prevalent among female sex tourists. However, writer Julie Bindel speculates, in an article for The Guardian, that HIV infection figures for the region suggest that condom use by the "beach boys" in the Caribbean may be sporadic, yet female sex tourists do not appear especially preoccupied by the potential risks.

Women seeking to experience sex with foreign men put themselves at a higher risk for sexually transmitted infections. Condom use during sex tours is relatively low. It is often cited that women have the intention to have safe sex with their casual sex partners while on vacation, but at some point during the initiation of the condom, the women do not follow through.

The sex workers usually will not initiate the use of a condom due to the limited availability of condoms, cost, beliefs, or previous experiences the sex worker has had with condoms. Female sex tourists report that, given the atmosphere and the exoticness of their lover, condoms are rarely used or discussed prior to engaging in sexual activities.

The lack of barrier contraceptives increases the risk of the tourist obtaining a sexually transmitted infection from their foreign partner especially when their partner has been with multiple women.

It has been found that in the Monteverde region of Costa Rica, female sex tourists engage in some form of unprotected sexual activity with local men known as gringueros (men who pursue gringas, women from the United States), according to data researched by Nancy Romero-Daza. The women in the study were found to not be traditional sex tourists but situational sex tourists.

== In popular culture ==
- Heading South is a 2005 drama film about three middle-aged women travelling to Haiti as sexual tourists at a time of political unrest.
- Paradise: Love is a 2012 drama film about a 50-year-old Austrian woman who travels to Kenya as a sex tourist.
- In 2020, Saturday Night Live faced controversy for a sketch starring Adele and Kate McKinnon as female sex tourists in Africa, which was accused of racial fetishisation.

== See also ==
- Male prostitution
- Sanky-panky
