= List of LGBTQ-related films of 2002 =

This is a list of lesbian, gay, bisexual, transgender or queer-related films released in 2002. It contains theatrically released films that deal with important gay, lesbian, bisexual, transgender or queer characters or issues and may have same-sex romance or relationships as a plot device.

== Films ==
Title	Director	Country	Genre	Cast	Notes
8 Women	François Ozon	France; Italy	Musical, comedy, crime, mystery	Danielle Darrieux, Isabelle Huppert, Catherine Deneuve, Fanny Ardant, Emmanuelle Béart, Virginie Ledoyen, Ludivine Sagnier, Firmine Richard, Dominique Lamure and Romy Schneider	a.k.a. 8 femmes; based on the play Huit femmes by Robert Thomas
9	Ümit Ünal	Turkey	Mystery, crime	Ali Poyrazoglu, Cezmi Baskin, Serra Yilmaz, Fikret Kuskan, Ozan Güven (billed as Ozan Guven), Esin Pervane and Rafa Radomisli	
9 Dead Gay Guys	Lab Ky Mo	United Kingdom	Crime, comedy	Glen Mulhern, Brendan Mackey, Steven Berkoff, Michael Praed, Vas Blackwood, Fish, Leon Herbert, Simon Godley, Carol Decker, Raymond Griffiths, Abdala Keserwani and Karen Sharman	
AKA	Duncan Roy	United Kingdom	Drama	Matthew Leitch, Diana Quick, George Asprey, Lindsey Coulson, Blake Ritson, Peter Youngblood Hills, Geoff Bell, Hannah Yelland, Daniel Lee, Bill Nighy, David Kendall, Fenella Woolgar, Sean Gilder, Robin Soans and Stephen Boxer	
L'Auberge Espagnole	Cédric Klapisch	France; Spain	Romance, comedy, drama	Romain Duris, Barnaby Metschurat, Judith Godrèche, Cécile de France, Kelly Reilly, Audrey Tautou, Cristina Brondo, Kevin Bishop, Wladimir Yordanoff, Federico D'Anna, Christian Pagh and Zinedine Soualem	a.k.a. "The Spanish inn"
The Badge	Robby Henson	United States	Mystery, thriller	Billy Bob Thornton, Patricia Arquette, William Devane	
Ben and Arthur	Sam Mraovich	United States	Drama	Sam Mraovich, Jamie Brett Gabel, Michael Haboush, Bill Hindley, Julie M. Zimmerman (billed as Julie Belknap), Gina Aguilar, Arthur Huber, Oto Brezina, Richard Hitchcock, Bruce Lurie, Buck Elkin, Nick Bennet, Loretta Altman and Holly Mraovich	It is often called "The "Worst Gay Movie Of All Time".
The Best Day of My Life	Cristina Comencini	Italy; United Kingdom	Drama	Virna Lisi, Margherita Buy, Sandra Ceccarelli, Luigi Lo Cascio, Marco Baliani, Marco Quaglia, Jean-Hugues Anglade, Ricky Tognazzi, Gaia Conforzi, Francesco Scianna, Francesca Perini, Maria Luisa De Crescenzo, Andrea Sama and Giulio Squillacciotti	a.k.a. Il Più bel giorno della mia vita
Blue	Hiroshi Ando	Japan	Romance, drama	Mikako Ichikawa, Manami Konishi, Asami Imajuku and Jun Murakami	
Blue Gate Crossing	Yee Chin-yen	Taiwan; France	Romance, drama	Chen Bolin, Gwei Lun-mei, Liang You Lin and Jay Shih	a.k.a. Lan se da men
The Business of Fancydancing	Sherman Alexie	United States	Drama	Evan Adams, Michelle St. John, Gene Tagaban, Swil Kanim, Rebecca Carroll, Cynthia Geary, Leo Rossi, Kevin Phillip, Elaine Miles, Arthur Tulee, Jim Boyd, Jennifer Elizabeth Kreisberg (billed as Jennifer Kreisberg), Ron Otis and William Joseph Elk III	
Chaos and Desire	Manon Briand	Canada	Drama	Pascale Bussières, Julie Gayet	a.k.a. La Turbulence des fluides
The Cockettes	Bill Weber, David Weissman	United States	Documentary	Sylvia Miles, John Waters, Dusty Dawn, Larry Brinkin, John Flowers, Goldie Glitters, Ann Harris, Fayette Hauser and Michael Kalmen	
Contact	Kieran Galvin	Australia	Short, drama	Michael Teulon, Beejan Land, Jill McKay, Paul Godfrey, Erin Mascord-Perez, David Whyte, Mira Sarac, Glenn Adnurn, Kath Gordon, Leigh Thomas, Ryan Brady Dunn, Alex Thorpe, Cory Maul, Nicki Byron and Alyssia Salfus	17 minutes long
Dahmer	David Jacobson	United States	Crime, drama	Jeremy Renner, Bruce Davison, Artel Kayàru, Matt Newton, Dion Basco, Kate Williamson, Christian Payano, Tom'ya Bowden and Sean Blakemore	
Family Fundamentals	Arthur Dong	United States	Documentary	Heather Beberay (from the Lesbian and Gay Men's Community Center, New York City, archive footage), Chaz Bono (billed as Chastity Bono), Sonny Bono, Kathleen Bremner (Expert Psychologist), Paul Bremner (Kathleen's husband), Pat Buchanan (sought the Republican presidential nomination in 1992 and 1996, archive footage), George W. Bush (archive footage), Laura Bush (archive footage), Mary Cheney (daughter of Vice President Dick Cheney, archive footage), Robert Dornan (U.S. Congressman, 1977–1997, archive footage, billed as Bob Dornan), Barney Frank (Member of Congress, archive footage) and Brett Matthews (First Lieutenant, US Air Force 1996-1998)	About Conservative parents having gay sons or daughters.
Far from Heaven	Todd Haynes	United States	Drama	Julianne Moore, Dennis Quaid, Dennis Haysbert, Patricia Clarkson, Viola Davis, James Rebhorn, Michael Gaston, Celia Weston, Barbara Garrick, Bette Henritze, June Squibb, Ryan Ward, Lindsay Andretta, Jordan Puryear, J. B. Adams and Olivia Birkelund	4 Academy Award nominations including Best Actress in a Leading Role for Julianne Moore.
Fine Dead Girls	Dalibor Matanic	Croatia	Drama, thriller	Olga Pakalović, Nina Violić, Krešimir Mikić, Inge Appelt, Ivica Vidović, Milan Štrljić, Mirko Boman, Jadranka Đokić, Boris Miholjević, Marina Poklepović, Janko Rakos and Ilija Zovko	a.k.a. Fine mrtve djevojke
Food of Love	Ventura Pons	Spain; Germany	Drama	Kevin Bishop, Paul Rhys, Juliet Stevenson, Allan Corduner, Craig Hill, Leslie Charles, Pamela Field, Naim Thomas and Geraldine McEwan	Based on the novel The Page Turner by David Leavitt
Friday After Next	Marcus Raboy	United States	Comedy, stoner	Ice Cube, Mike Epps	
Happy Birthday	Yen Tan	United States	Drama	Benjamin Patrick, Michelle E. Michael, John Frazier, Devashish Saxena, Ethel Lung, Denton Blane Everett, Xiao Fei Zhao, Lynn Chambers, Derik Webb, Chip Gilliam, Natalie Thrash, Debbie Rey, Ryan Harper, James M. Johnston and David Lowery	
The Hours	Stephen Daldry	United States; United Kingdom	Drama	Nicole Kidman, Stephen Dillane, Miranda Richardson, Lyndsey Marshal, Linda Bassett, Julianne Moore, John C. Reilly, Jack Rovello, Toni Collette, Margo Martindale, Meryl Streep, Ed Harris, Allison Janney, Claire Danes, Jeff Daniels and Julianne Moore	Based on the novel of the same name by Michael Cunningham; 9 Academy Award nominations including Best Picture.
In the City Without Limits	Antonio Hernández	Spain; Argentina	Drama	Leonardo Sbaraglia, Fernando Fernán Gómez, Geraldine Chaplin, Ana Fernández, Adriana Ozores, Leticia Brédice and Alfredo Alcón	a.k.a. En la ciudad sin límites
Inside	Michel Jetté	Canada	Drama	Emmanuel Auger, Karyne Lemieux, David Boutin	
Issues 101	John Lincoln	United States	Romance, drama	Michael Rozman, Dennis W. Rittenhouse Jr., Jeff Sublett, Jason Boegh, Yolanda Johnston, Jeremy Smith, Gary Castro Churchwell, Trevor Murphy, Kelly Clarkson, Larissa Kern, Chris Benson, Brian Swinehart, Dan Callaway, Michael Haboush and Brad Murphy	
Ken Park	Larry Clark, Edward Lachman	United States; Netherlands; France	Drama	Tiffany Limos, James Bullard, Stephen Jasso, James Ransone, Adam Chubbuck, Maeve Quinlan, Bill Fagerbakke, Eddie Daniels, Seth Gray, Patricia Place, Harrison Young, Amanda Plummer, Wade Williams, Julio Oscar Mechoso, Zara McDowell, Mike Apaletegui, Richard Riehle and Larry Clark	
The Last Year	Jeff London	United States	Drama	Ron Petronicolos, Jason Sumabat, Patrick Orion Hoesterey, Seth Adams, Jason Freeman, Dale Ferranti, Elizabeth Flesh, Merrick McMahon, Randy Lee, Rocky Traylor, Mike Dolan, Duane Waddell, Lawrence Rinzel, Rand Smith, Craig Staswick, Joseph Olesh, Penelope Ma, David Running	
Leaving Metropolis	Brad Fraser	Canada	Comedy, drama	Troy Ruptash, Vince Corazza (billed as Vincent Corazza), Lynda Boyd, Cherilee Taylor, Thom Allison, Arne MacPherson, Tom Anniko, Paul Stafford, Chris Sigurdson (billed as Christopher Sigurdson), Susan Kelso, Blake Taylor, Kirsten Johnson, John Bluethner and David Brindle	Based on Fraser's play Poor Super Man
Lisístrata	Francesc Bellmunt	Spain	Comedy	Maribel Verdú, Juan Luis Galiardo, Javier Gurruchaga, Jesús Bonilla, Teté Delgado (billed as Tete Delgado), Aitor Mazo, Glòria Cano, Eduardo Antuña, Antonio Belart, Cristina Solà, Anna Maria Barbany (billed as Anna Mª Barbany), Albert Trifol, Sonia Ferrer (billed as Sònia Ferrer), Sergio Pazos and José Corbacho	Based on a comic book by Ralf König, which in turn is loosely based on the play Lysistrata by Aristophanes
Luster	Everett Lewis	United States	Comedy, drama	Justin Herwick, Shane Powers, B. Wyatt, Pamela Gidley, Susannah Melvoin, Willie Garson, Jonah Blechman, Sean Thibodeau, Henriette Mantel, Norman Reedus and Chris Freeman	
My Life on Ice	Olivier Ducastel, Jacques Martineau	France	Comedy	Jimmy Tavares, Ariane Ascaride, Jonathan Zaccaï, Hélène Surgère, Lucas Bonnifait, Hanako Bron and Frédéric Gorny	a.k.a. Ma vraie vie à Rouen
Madame Satã	Karim Aïnouz	Brazil; France	Drama	Lázaro Ramos, Marcélia Cartaxo, Flavio Bauraqui, Fellipe Marques, Renata Sorrah, Emiliano Queiroz, Giovana Barbosa, Ricardo Blat, Guilherme Piva, Marcelo Valle, Floriano Peixoto, Gero Camilo, Gláucio Gomes and Orã Figueiredo	
Mango Souffle	Mahesh Dattani	India	Comedy, drama	Rinke Khanna, Darius Taraporewal, Veena Sajnani, Ankur Vikal, Atul Kulkarni, Mahmood Farooqui, Pooja, Faredoon Dodo Bhujwala, Heeba Shah, Shunori Ramanathan (billed as Shenori Ramnathan), Mikhail Sen, Kalyanraman, Shilpa M., Suma Sudhindra, Manek Shah, Sanjit Bedi, Denzil Smith, U.K. Jayadev and Rubi Chakravarthy	
Mango Yellow	Cláudio Assis	Brazil	Drama	Matheus Nachtergaele, Jonas Bloch, Dira Paes, Chico Díaz, Leona Cavalli, Conceição Camarotti, Magdale Alves, Jones Melo, José Sebastião da Silva, Taveira Júnior, Everaldo Pontes and Cosme Soares	a.k.a. Amarelo Manga
The Mars Canon	Shiori Kazama	Japan	Romance	Makiko Kuno, Mami Nakamura, Fumiyo Kohinata, Kiyohiko Shibukawa, Eri Hayasaka, Haruku Shinozak and Ryuichi Hiroki	a.k.a. Kasei no kanon
The Matthew Shepard Story	Roger Spottiswoode	Canada; United States	Crime, drama	Shane Meier, Stockard Channing, Sam Waterston	TV movie
Merci Docteur Rey	Andrew Litvack	France; United States	Comedy	Dianne Wiest, Jane Birkin, Stanislas Merhar, Bulle Ogier, Karim Saleh, Didier Flamand, Roschdy Zem, Nathalie Richard, Dan Herzberg, Jerry Hall, Simon Callow and Vanessa Redgrave	
Miss 501: A Portrait of Luck	Jules Karatechamp	Canada	Documentary	Burger	
My Mother Likes Women	Daniela Féjerman, Inés París	Spain	Comedy, drama	Leonor Watling, Rosa María Sardá, María Pujalte, Silvia Abascal, Eliska Sirova, Chisco Amado, Álex Angulo, Aitor Mazo and Xabier Elorriaga	a.k.a. A mi madre le gustan las mujeres
The Other Side of the Bed	Emilio Martínez Lázaro	Spain	Comedy, drama, musical	Ernesto Alterio, Paz Vega, Guillermo Toledo, Natalia Verbeke, Alberto San Juan, María Esteve, Ramón Barea and Nathalie Poza	a.k.a. El otro lado de la cama and The Wrong Side of the Bed
P.S. Your Cat Is Dead	Steve Guttenberg	United States	Comedy	Lombardo Boyar, Steve Guttenberg, Cynthia Watros, A. J. Benza, Tom Wright, Shirley Knight and Kenneth Moskow	Based on the novel of the same name by James Kirkwood Jr.
Punch	Guy Bennett	Canada	Comedy	Michael Riley, Sonja Bennett, Meredith McGeachie	
The Rules of Attraction	Roger Avary	United States; Germany	Romance, comedy, drama, thriller	James Van Der Beek, Shannyn Sossamon, Ian Somerhalder, Jessica Biel, Kate Bosworth, Kip Pardue, Clifton Collins Jr., Thomas Ian Nicholas, Faye Dunaway, Eric Stoltz, Fred Savage, Theresa Wayman, Jay Baruchel, Joel Michaely, Clare Kramer, Swoosie Kurtz and Ron Jeremy Hyatt	Based on the novel of the same name by Bret Easton Ellis
Saving Private Tootsie (Prom Chompoo)	Kittikorn Liasirikun	Thailand	Comedy, drama	Sorapong Chatree, Akara Amarttayakul (billed as Puthichai Amatayakul), Seri Wongmontha, Ornnapa Krissadee, Thongthong Mokjok, Kowit Wattanakul, Ad Carabao, Theeradanai Suwannahom and Boriwat Yuto	Fictionalised account of a plane carrying Thai gay-transgender entertainers crashing in the Burmese jungle and being rescued by Thai Special Forces.
Talk to Her	Pedro Almodóvar	Spain	Drama	Javier Cámara, Darío Grandinetti, Leonor Watling, Rosario Flores, Mariola Fuentes, Geraldine Chaplin, Pina Bausch, Malou Airaudo, Caetano Veloso, Roberto Álvarez, Elena Anaya, Lola Dueñas, Adolfo Fernández, Ana Fernández, Chus Lampreave and Paz Vega	
Thani Thatuwen Piyabanna	Asoka Handagama	Sri Lanka	Drama	Anoma Janadari, Gayani Gisanthika, Mahendra Perera, W. Jayasiri, Jagath Chamila and Wilson Gunaratne	a.k.a. Flying with one Wing
Tom	Mike Hoolboom	Canada	Documentary	Tom Chomont	
The Trip	Miles Swain	United States	Romance, comedy, drama	Larry Sullivan, Steve Braun, Ray Baker, James Handy, Faith Salie, Dennis Bailey, Alexis Arquette, Sirena Irwin, Jill St. John, Art Hindle, Julie Brown and David Mixner	
Unconditional Love	P. J. Hogan	United States	Musical, comedy, drama	Kathy Bates, Rupert Everett, Meredith Eaton, Lynn Redgrave, Stephanie Beacham, Richard Briers, Dan Aykroyd, Jonathan Pryce, Peter Sarsgaard, Barry Manilow and Julie Andrews	
Under One Roof	Todd Wilson	United States	Romance, comedy	Jay Wong, James Marks, Sandra Lee, James Quedado, Audrey Finer, Vivian Kobayashi, Trish Ng, Sina Eiden, Erik Ing, Xin Feng Lin, Ken Craig, Leslie MacKay, Christopher Stout, Wyman Chang and Dianne Cragg	
Venus Boyz	Gabrielle Baur	Switzerland; United States; Germany	Documentary	Diane Torr, MilDréd Gerestant, Del LaGrace Volcano, Queen Bee Luscious, Mistress Formika, Philly Abe, Dee Finley, Mo Fischer, Judith Halberstam, Bridge Markland, Simo Maronati, Shelly Mars, Martina Meijer Torr, Marcel Meijer and A. Hans Scheirl	A film about female masculinity, mainly as Drag kings.
When Boys Fly	Stewart Halpern-Fingerhut, Lenid Rolov	United States	Documentary		Follows several attendees of the annual White Party in Miami, Florida.
Yossi & Jagger	Eytan Fox	Israel	Romance, drama, war	Ohad Knoller, Yehuda Levi, Assi Cohen, Aya Steinovitz, Hani Furstenberg, Sharon Raginiano, Yuval Semo, Yaniv Moyal, Hanan Savyon, Erez Kahana, Shmulik Bernheimer and Yael Pearl	
You'll Get Over It	Fabrice Cazeneuve	France	Drama	Julien Baumgartner, Julia Maraval, Jérémie Elkaïm, François Comar, Patrick Bonnel, Christiane Millet, Antoine Michel, Nils Ohlund, Bernard Blancan and Eric Bonicatto	a.k.a. À cause d'un garçon
