= White party =

White party may refer to:

== Political parties ==
- White Party (Azerbaijan)
- National Party (Uruguay)
- White Party of America, defunct neo-Nazi political party
- Political colour § White for a general discussion on the use of the color white by political parties

== Organized events ==
- Circuit party
- White Party Miami
- Diddy parties
