= Lucky Bastard =

Lucky Bastard may refer to:

- Lucky Bastard (2009 film), a drama film
- Lucky Bastard (2013 film), a found footage horror film

== See also ==
- Lucky Bastards, an album by Peter Pan Speedrock
