= FAQ (disambiguation) =

FAQ is a list of frequently asked questions.

FAQ or faq may also refer to:

- FAQ (Frequently Asked Questions), a composition by Juan María Solare
- FAQ: Frequently Asked Questions, a 2004 Spanish film
- FAQs (film), a 2005 American film
- Fitiuta Airport, in American Samoa
- Frieda River Airport, in Papua New Guinea
