= Noize =

Noize may refer to:

- Noise music
  - Power noise, derivative of noise music and electronic dance music
- Noizemag or noiZe Magazine, a published guide to Circuit parties, gay dance events, and festivals
- DJ Noize (born 1975), Danish DJ
- Boys Noize (born 1982), German electronic music producer and DJ
- Noize MC (born 1985), Russian singer and actor
- "Noize", a song by Jaden Smith featuring Tyler, the Creator from the 2019 album Erys
