= Todd Wilson (director) =

American film director (1963–2005)

Todd Chadwick Wilson (August 31, 1963 — September 4, 2005) was a film director who made several gay films. Wilson's two feature films highlight gay male Asian-White relationships.

According to colleague Jack Curtis Dubowsky, "Todd believed much of queer cinema suffered from deficiencies such as overall negativity, downer endings, and lack of emotional and physical payoff. Todd infused his films with positive likable characters, happy endings, and emotional and titillating payoffs."

== Films ==
- Haiku Love (Short, possibly unreleased)
- Rice and Potatoes (Feature Documentary)
- Under One Roof (TLA Releasing, 2002)
- Can't Buy Me Love (Released posthumously)
- NYC Dilemma (Released posthumously)

== Awards ==
- Best Foreign Film 2002 Mix Brasil (Under One Roof)
- Special Recognition of a Score Award, Fire Island Gay and Lesbian Film and Video Festival 2002 (Under One Roof)
- Audience Award 2003 Barcelona International Gay and Lesbian Film Festival (Under One Roof)
- Best Short Film, Out Takes Dallas 2006 (Can't Buy Me Love)

== Personal life ==
Born in Troy, New York, Wilson got into still photography as a boy and graduated from Rochester Institute of Technology and Rensselaer Polytechnic Institute. Todd was an elder of the First United Presbyterian Church when he lived in Troy. He was active in the gay student organization at RPI and started a radio show there. He died in San Francisco, California of lung cancer.
