= B. Wyatt =

American actor

Barry "B." Wyatt is an American actor. He is known for his collaborative relationship with independent film writer, director, and producer Everett Lewis. Together the two have made three films: The Natural History of Parking Lots, Skin & Bone, and Luster.
