= Finding Me =

- Directed by: Roger S. Omeus Jr.
- Written by: Roger S. Omeus Jr.
- Starring: RayMartell Moore; J'Nara Corbin; Derrick L. Briggs; Eugene Turner; Maurice Murrell; Ron DeSuze
- Distributed by: TLA Releasing
- Release date: March 3, 2009
- Running time: 115 minutes
- Country: United States
- Language: English

Finding Me is a 2009 drama film directed by Roger S. Omeus Jr. The film was released on March 3, 2009, and stars RayMartell Moore as Faybien Allen, a young gay man who must navigate through a series of complex relationships while dealing with everyday struggles.

== Plot ==
Faybien Allen is a young gay man of Haitian descent living in Jersey City. Lacking direction in his life, Faybien constantly questions his aspirations as he is not quite sure who he is. Still living at home with his overbearing, homophobic father and grieving the loss of his mother, his self-esteem begins to sink as he works at a dead end job and misses an important job interview. Faybien finds love and support through his friends, Greg Marsh and Amera Jones. Greg, a free-spirited bisexual and an amazing sous chef, is Faybien's best friend. He serves as a voice of reason to Faybien, always telling it like it is through his self-confidence. Amera is an outspoken, aspiring singer with a big heart. She and Greg are polar opposites and bicker as if they were a married couple but both are always there for Faybien in time of need. When Faybien is overwhelmed by the temperament of his father, he finds himself staying with Greg on numerous occasions.

Adding fuel to the trio's mix, Greg introduces Faybien and Amera to his new roommate, Jay Timber. Jay comes off as a man of mystery at first with his warm personality but his shady past becomes present when he solicits sex in the apartment behind his roommate's back. Jay delights in causing extreme amounts of trouble and is a self-declared "bitch".

Amidst his self-loathing and desperation, Faybien has a chance encounter with Lonnie Wilson, a young political activist and businessman. Unlike Faybien, Lonnie is openly gay and confident. He shows a strong interest in pursuing Faybien. Faybien's insecurities hinder him from wanting to establish a mutual connection with Lonnie. Lonnie continues to make several attempts at helping Faybien to overcome his fears in accepting the man that he knows he can be.

Over time, Faybien does his best to smooth his relationship with his father while simultaneously entering into a relationship with flirty Lonnie. But Faybien ultimately decides that his sure of what he wants, ending their budding relationship.

== Cast ==
- RayMartell Moore as Faybien Allen
- Derrick L. Briggs as Lonnie Wilson
- J'Nara Corbin as Amera Jones
- Eugene E. Turner as Greg Marsh
- Maurice Murrell as Jaylen 'Jay' Timber
- Ron DeSuze as Faybien's father

== Production ==
Omeus was inspired to create the film and its followups after viewing gay-themed media such as Noah’s Arc and Punks. He also found inspiration from other media such as Degrassi High, as he felt that the series was not as Americanized as other television series. The movie was filmed on a limited budget, which Omeus found to be a challenge because it necessitated that he perform in roles other than the director and also limited filming to weekends. While filming Omeus tried to capture the "core that the black community seems to have against homosexuality", which he described as "unnerving" and "frightening".

== Other media ==
The film has had several continuations. In 2011 Omeus released Finding Me: Truth, a sequel to the original film. The movie continues to follow Faybien, who has since left his dead end job at the mall, while his friends Amera and Greg have experienced changes in their lives as well.

The following year Omeus began a webseries entitled Finding Me: The Series, which also features the characters of Faybien and Greg. Actress J'Nara Corbin, who starred as Amera in the films, did not return for her role in the webseries. Omeus pitched the series to Logo TV and BET, but did not receive a reply.
