= Patrick Tatten =

American actor

- Born: Patrick James Bolger Tatten; January 21, 1981 (age 45); Sterling, Massachusetts, United States
- Occupations: Actor, Producer
- Years active: 2003–present

Patrick John Blair Tatten (born January 21, 1981) is an American actor and producer. He is best known for roles in films such as: Dirty Deeds, The Good German, The Soloist, Lucky Bastard, and Boystown on OutTV.

== Early life ==
Tatten was born in Sterling, Massachusetts. He started taking violin lessons at the age of three. He was enrolled in the Thayer Conservatory by his mother. Then Tatten completed St. Mark's School in 2000 and Connecticut College in 2004, with a BA in music theory. In 2005, he moved to Hollywood becoming a resident of Los Angeles. He works as an actor in both television and film, while also frequently performing as a violinist and musical guest of various acts in Hollywood.

== Filmography ==
Film
Year	Film	Role	Notes
2003	Looking for My Brother	Military Policeman	
2005	Tennis, Anyone...?	Ball Boy	
2005	Dirty Deeds	Student	
2006	The Good German	Political Attache	
2007	Normal, California	Manager	
2008	The Wind and The Long Black Scarf	Jonathon	
2009	The Soloist	Paul Jr.	
2009	Lucky Bastard	Rusty	
2009	The Ones	Fiancé Seth	(post-production)
2017	Hollywood Reflections: A Fable	Austin Cheevers	(Short)
2018	Killer Party	Howard	(Short)
Year	Television series	Role	Other notes
2007	Andrew Jackson	Lt. Sam Houston	TV movie
2016	BoysTown	Chance	TV series, 8 episodes
2018	Some Kind of Wonderful	Eddie	TV series, 1 episode
