= The Stranger in Us =

2010 film by Scott Boswell

- Film poster
- Directed by: Scott Boswell
- Written by: Scott Boswell
- Produced by: Cheryl Simas Valenzuela
- Starring: Raphael Barker; Adam Perez; Scott Cox
- Cinematography: Spenser Nottage; Laura Valladao
- Edited by: Matt Hale
- Music by: True Margrit
- Distributed by: Breaking Glass Pictures; TLA-UK; GM Films; Optimale; Bounty Films; Mi2N
- Release date: June 23, 2010 (Frameline)
- Running time: 106 minutes
- Country: United States
- Language: English
- Budget: $50 thousand

The Stranger in Us is a 2010 American dramatic feature film written and directed by Scott Boswell. The film premiered at Frameline Film Festival and went on to screen at U.S. and international film festivals, winning audience awards at Reeling Chicago and Pikes Peak Lavender Film Festivals. The film was later licensed for global distribution and online viewing, and released to DVD in December 2010.

The story centers on Anthony, an eager small-town newcomer to San Francisco dealing with an abusive ex-lover, who strikes up an unlikely friendship with Gavin, a teenage homeless street hustler. Anthony uses his poetry to try to make sense of his situation. Using a non-chronological style, the vérité-style drama explores youthful impulsivity and perilous street life.

== Plot ==
The film explores isolation and loss in the urban landscape of San Francisco. The story unfolds through the non-sequential memories of its central character, Anthony. Taking a bus to an undisclosed destination, he grapples with the loss of the only two meaningful relationships he established since arriving in the city.

He relives telltale moments with his volatile lover, Stephen. Having met Stephen only briefly in Virginia, Anthony decides to leave his rural life and head west to California for a domestic urban life. His exciting new life quickly sours as Anthony encounters Stephen's anger and manipulative behaviors. As he relies on Stephen financially and emotionally, Anthony does not know where to turn when their arguments evolve to physical violence.

He quickly slips into social and spiritual-paralysis. Unable to pursue his dream of writing poetry, Anthony goes out night after night, encountering a number of other drifters, including a crooning transgender woman, homeless youth, and drug dealers.

Eventually he meets Gavin, a runaway teen hustler living on the streets. Almost effortlessly, Gavin comes and goes, unexpectedly becoming a playful and nurturing force in Anthony's life, even taking on a parental role at times. Anthony comes to rely on Gavin's friendship until Stephen reemerges and asks Anthony to come back to him. Gavin's street life becomes progressively more impossible for him to handle, and though Anthony tries to help him, he disappears without warning. Hitting bottom in his emotional spiral, Anthony attempts to turn his life around by embarking on a mission to find his young friend.

== Cast ==
- Raphael Barker as Anthony
- Adam David as Gavin (as Adam Perez)
- Kelly Sanchez as Jeremy
- Scott Cox as Stephen
- Goldie Chan as Nancy
- Jesse Schoem as Drug Dealer
- Matthew Bridges as Kevin
- Jeffrey Weissman as Anthony's Co-Worker
- Brian Levy as Pushy Trick
- Veronica Klaus as Serenading Diva
- Marc Scruggs as Terry
- David Scott Keller as Greg

== Production ==
Funded with private financing and small investments, the film was executive-produced by Scott Boswell through Paperback Films. Originally conceived as a hybrid documentary-fiction portrait about San Francisco's Tenderloin district, writer-director Boswell wrote the 108-page script only after casting lead actor Raphael Barker. Boswell acknowledges that Barker's interest in the project altered his approach, causing him to opt instead to create an autobiographical narrative: “I credit him [Barker] indirectly for the trajectory that the process of making the film took….It became more and more traditional in its scope…the lead character is more or less a surrogate for my own story.”

== Reception ==
The Stranger in Us received mostly favorable reviews during its festival run. Dennis Harvey of Variety called the film a "modest but affecting drama" that is "engrossing by leisurely degrees." Michael Guillen of The Evening Class wrote, “Scott Boswell's first feature The Stranger In Us faces the street with considerable compassion, observing the youthful exploration of urban night life with generous honesty and tact.” And Seán Martinfield of the San Francisco Sentinel wrote that the film "stands high in best screenplays at this year’s Frameline Film Festival….The film is fabulously crafted, its subjects are challenging and hard, and the performances are true.”

Rich Cline of Shadows on the Wall gave the film a more critical review, noting the film is “artfully made…but by fracturing the chronology, it ends up feeling rather long and repetitive. And it lacks the emotional punch it could have had with a more forceful dramatic arc.”
