= Noizemag =

US magazine

- Editor-in-Chief: Steve Weinstein
- Categories: Gay lifestyle magazine
- Frequency: Quarterly
- Publisher: Stephen Ceplenski
- Founded: 1993
- Company: Noize Magazine, LLC
- Country: United States
- Language: English
- Website: noiZe.buzz at the Wayback Machine (archived 2023-02-03)

NoiZemag is a published guide to circuit parties, gay dance events, and festivals. For the first twelve years of its twenty-two years, it was known under its original name Circuit Noize.

Noize has been quoted and referenced in mainstream publications such as Out, The New York Times, Genre, and the Chicago Tribune. Original Circuit Noize articles have been used by various local AIDS and gay health organizations for education, safe sex, and harm reduction. In 1998, the documentary film Got 2b There by José Torrealba featured Circuit Noize as an authority within the circuit community.

== History ==
Started in late 1993 by Steve Brosky from Florida, the first issue was nothing more than a foldout flyer listing upcoming gay-themed benefit events occurring on what was becoming known as "the circuit". Kammon was witty and passionate about the parties he loved, and the general sense of community that they inspired in him. For the second issue, he partnered with friends Stephen Ceplenski and Gary Steinberg—an L.A. couple also deeply involved in the circuit scene—who agreed to publish Circuit Noize as a magazine instead of a flyer, selling ads to the promoters of the parties listed in the calendar. The magazine has run quarterly ever since.

As Circuit Noize became a fixture in the circuit scene, Kammon listed the events and helped create the very idea of a "circuit" of gay benefit parties. He also gave a platform to friends in the circuit community to express themselves, exploring the issues facing the mostly gay audience that attended these events regularly. Kammon himself wrote regularly about things such as circuit spirituality and the complexities of drug use in the scene. In addition, Kammon ran regular features profiling the DJs, promoters, and personalities that made the circuit come alive. In 1998, Kammon turned to a friend from New York, Jeffery Taylor, who took up the duty of editing the submissions for clarity and grammar, as well as producing profile content.

== Themes ==
The roots of the circuit lie in the all-night bacchanals pioneered by people such as Larry Levan and places such as the Saint at Large. Urban gay men suddenly had the opportunity to mingle and party freely amongst themselves with a brash openness that had been unheard of until then, and the explosion of the Stonewall movement ushered in an era of cultural and sexual expression that was both liberating to gay men and somewhat shocking to the average heterosexual. The reality check of the AIDS crisis in the '80s forced these revelers to fight a battle to raise money and awareness for a disease that many people felt they deserved. Benefit beach parties sprang up in the gay summer hideaway of Fire Island, and soon the concept took off and became a staple for raising the much-needed funds to get the ball rolling for local AIDS treatment and prevention organizations such as Gay Men's Health Crisis.

Once the circuit became a definable concept, the list of parties vying to be included grew longer and longer. Some notable events include White Party in Miami, Black Party in New York, Cherry in D.C, and Southern Decadence in New Orleans. Circuit Noize listed them all, and covered the events and the lifestyle surrounding them.

Kammon was well aware of the complex psychological and personal issues that the circuit audience left at the door when they came out to play, and addressed topics such as safer sex, harm reduction in relation to drug use, and overall spirituality and wellness. Despite the minor controversies that sprang up around the circuit as it became a global playground for a mostly white, wealthy demographic, Kammon never stopped believing in the importance of the community that it provided to the circuit crowd. Even those who never attended the parties soon got the idea that there was a worldwide network of people celebrating gay culture and raising money to help those in need, and some would argue that the circuit helped cement the idea of a global gay community into the minds of the general public.

== Evolution and redesign ==
On September 13, 2006, Steve Kammon died, leaving the ownership and maintenance of Circuit Noize in the hands of Ceplenski, Steinberg, and Taylor. Taylor enlisted his friend and a Circuit Noize columnist, Michael Taylor (no relation), to help him helm the editorial side. At the end of 2006, the four met in L.A. to brainstorm how to best carry on Kammon's legacy. The decision was made to do a re-launch as noiZe, encompassing everything that Kammon held dear as well as updating the design elements and broadening the content to include things not directly circuit-related but relevant to their gay audience. Introducing the tagline "Celebrate. Explore. Live.", noiZe promised to cover the circuit as well as the events, people, and issues that had grown beyond the circuit.

The move was misunderstood by some to be a repudiation of the circuit and was greeted with mixed reactions, sparking a piece in Out magazine by Steve Weinstein, a well-respected New York editor and journalist. The piece, titled "Save the Last Dance", questioned whether the name change reflected a larger decline within the circuit world, and noted that different types of events, such as festivals and all-gay cruises, were on the rise.

These changes, far from proving that the circuit was dead, were actually a reflection of how successful the circuit concept had become over the years. There was a dedicated audience for these types of events, and more importantly, the circuit audience was willing and able to travel extensively to participate. Hoping to grab some of these gay travel dollars, outfits like Atlantis Events started producing gay vacation packages in Mexico as well as a successful series of gay cruises in places such as the Caribbean, Spain, and Asia. The concept of the circuit party itself was also expanding into the idea of longer festivals—Black & Blue in Canada, Sydney Mardi Gras in Australia, as well as Europride and Loveball in Europe. Gay pride festivals all over the world also took on some circuit aspects, throwing huge closing parties with top circuit DJs and performers. Working now as noiZe allowed more free rein in covering all of these events.

The first issue of noiZe, and the 51st issue overall, laid out the noiZe mission in a piece called "Flipping the Circuit Breaker," which asked:

...why change anything? Why noiZe? We all felt that Steve's legacy was best served by closing the door on one chapter of what we had done to open a new one that recognized two key things. One, how Circuit Noize has grown to be much more than simply a calendar of events; and two, how the circuit itself has grown and changed in a variety of ways. This transition and our new name hope to reflect the way that we have broadened our coverage of gay issues to be relevant not only to the circuit but also to the larger gay community itself. We thought that the word noiZe would be a great way to reflect that broader scope without losing the connection and the love that we will always have for the circuit and the amazing people that make it such a vibrant community."

— noiZe Magazine

Following the recruitment of Steve Weinstein as editor-in-chief, noiZe shifted its editorial focus to include both traditional circuit coverage and emerging forms of gay entertainment. The publication's programming also emphasized public health topics, such as safe sex practices and harm reduction within the community.

In 2015 noiZe rebranded to noiZe.buzz and noiZe.photos, two website dedicated to gay dance events and over 40,000 photos in an archive that spans over 20 years.
