= When Boys Fly =

- Directed by: Stewart Halpern; Lenid Rolov
- Produced by: Stewart Halpern; Lenid Rolov
- Cinematography: Clay Westervelt
- Edited by: Richard Choi; Jenni Gold; Kevin Proux
- Music by: Robert Wayne Johnson; John Swihart
- Distributed by: TLA Releasing
- Release date: 2002
- Running time: 62 minutes
- Language: English

When Boys Fly is a 2002 documentary film about gay circuit parties directed by Stewart Halpern and Lenid Rolov.

The documentary played a number of gay and lesbian film festivals before being released on Region 1 DVD on November 26, 2002.

== Synopsis ==
The film follows several attendees of the annual White Party in Miami, Florida. The major subjects are:

- Tone, a 21-year-old from Dallas, Texas. Tone has attended several previous circuit parties and has gotten in trouble with out of control recreational drug usage. His stated goal is to become a biology teacher but despite having enough college credits to be a senior he has no major. His roommate Scott is very concerned about his drug use and has delivered an ultimatum: if he "fucks up" at the White Party he will be thrown out of the house and out of his roommates' lives.
- Brandon, a 23-year-old UCLA student who's never been to a circuit party before. He is a friend of Tone's and they travel to the party together. Brandon is very firm in his decision not to use drugs at the party and worries that he will be ostracized at the party for his decision.
- Floridians Jon, Jason and Todd. Jon is 19 years old. Jason is in his early 20s. Todd is in his mid 30s. Jon and Todd have been dating for two years. Before they dated, Todd and Jason dated. Initially there was tension between Jason and Jon but now they are best friends. The only reason Jon agreed to attend was that Todd promised that Jon would be the focus of all of Todd's attention.

=== Pre-party ===
Brandon loses track of Tone, who is unconcerned as he seeks out his "circuit friends." Brandon meets Greg, his boyfriend Jeff, and some of his friends and they shop for party outfits. Greg and his group think Brandon is cool, but Brandon initially thinks Greg is a "typical shallow circuit type." As he gets to know them better he realizes that Greg (who was earning his PhD in Psychology at University of Michigan and planned to enter academia) is deeper than he first thought.

Jon and Todd tell of their traumatic experience with the illegal party drug GHB at a previous party. After taking a normal dose, both of them stopped breathing within 30 minutes and were hospitalized on respirators for several days.

=== At the party ===
Tone is staying sober and not having fun. He meets his friend Matt, who feeds him GHB, rationalizing that if he is the one dosing Tone then Matt can control and monitor his usage.

Jon catches Todd "fucking around" with another man and breaks up with him on the spot. Despite having observed Jon and Todd's bad reactions to GHB, Jason decides to take some. He ends up passed out and Jon and Todd take care of him.

Brandon stays true to his decision to stay off drugs. His fears of ostracism prove to be unfounded.

=== Post-party ===
Following their return home, Jon and Todd no longer speak. Several months after the party, Brandon has met a boyfriend and brought him home to meet his mother. Tone continued to party and do drugs until he suffered a mild stroke at age 22. Scott nursed him back to health. Tone entered a rehab center and as of the release date of the film remained clean and sober.
