= Lucky Bastard (2009 film) =

- Promotional poster
- Directed by: Everett Lewis
- Written by: Everett Lewis
- Produced by: Charles Myers; Robert Shulevitz; Scott Arundale
- Starring: Patrick Tatten; Dale Dymkoski; Johnny Kostrey; Timothy Cole
- Cinematography: Linda J. Brown
- Release date: July 14, 2009
- Running time: 95 minutes
- Country: United States
- Language: English

Lucky Bastard is a 2009 drama film written and directed by Everett Lewis and starring Patrick Tatten, Dale Dymkoski, Johnny Kostrey, and Timothy Cole. The film premiered as an Official Selection of the 27th annual Outfest LGBT film festival.

== Plot ==
Rusty is a young designer with a successful business and a great boyfriend. After losing one important client and facing a lawsuit from another, Rusty gets picked up by Denny, a sexy hustler and crystal meth addict who takes Rusty to dark places Rusty never knew existed. Rusty must choose between returning to his old life and joining Denny in his.

== Cast ==
- Patrick Tatten as Rusty
- Dale Dymkoski as Denny
- Johnny Kostrey as Daniel
- Timothy Cole as Garrett

== Production ==
Writer/director Lewis drew upon his own relationship experiences with a meth addict in creating the film: "A lot of things in the film are conversations and events I had, and a lot of direct quotes [became] lines....Denny's monologue was taken from a guy I met who was in AA and recovering, and lived in a single room." The film was produced by noted independent filmmakers and frequent collaborators Robert Shulevitz and Charles Myers. Filming took place over a month in a number of Los Angeles locations and editing took another six months. Lucky Bastard features a soundtrack by William V. Malpede, who had also scored Lewis's previous film, FAQs.

== Critical response ==
Critical reaction to Lucky Bastard has been sharply divided. L.A. Splash magazine called the film "the first disappointment" of the Outfest festival, citing Rusty's lack of visible emotional development and "two dimensional personae (sic)". The reviewer praises Dale Dymkoski's performance as Denny, noting the "desperate duplicity" he brings to the role. The film, she concludes, focuses on the wrong protagonist. The LGBT news and entertainment portal Edge concurs in this assessment. Noting that the film's premise would make for an interesting character study by examining why Rusty is so willing to jeopardize his relationship with his boyfriend, the reviewer concludes, "There is nothing going on here. No plot. No sense of time or place. No character development or plot momentum of any kind. We just watch a decent guy fall for a loser and wonder why?" Dismissing the camerawork as "strictly film-school" with little variance in shot or angle and although appreciative of the attractiveness of the two leads, the reviewer chides Lewis to remember that "Hunky boys do not a good film make." Conversely, the Philadelphia Gay News calls Lucky Bastard a "bold and compelling drama" in which Lewis "takes a mature and more intimate direction". PGN cites Denny's monologue in particular, calling it "an emotional, dramatic moment that will likely rivet most viewers".

Lewis anticipated this divided response. "I think that people in the gay community are going to see the film is right on the button, or not at all close. They will accept it strongly or dismiss it because they have their own experience of many of these issues."
