= Finding Me: Truth =

- Directed by: Roger S. Omeus Jr.
- Written by: Roger S. Omeus Jr.
- Starring: RayMartell Moore; J'Nara Corbin; Derrick L. Briggs; Eugene Turner; Maurice Murrell; Ron DeSuze
- Distributed by: TLA Releasing
- Release date: July 14, 2011 (Philadelphia QFest)
- Running time: 100 minutes
- Country: United States
- Language: English

Finding Me: Truth is a 2011 drama film directed by Roger S. Omeus Jr. It is a sequel to the 2009 Finding Me.

== Plot ==
A year later, Faybien has been keeping in touch with Lonnie by writing him numerous letters, updating him on what's been going on with he and his friends. He never receives a letter in return, assuming that Lonnie has moved on. Faybien's life has changed as he has ended his dead end job at the mall. As for his friends, Amera and Greg, their lives have changed as well. Amera has found love with her boyfriend of four months, Gabe, and awaits the release of her new album. Unfortunately, Greg has lost his job and has trouble finding employment. To ease the employment woes, he has entered a blossoming relationship with Reggie Hunt, a struggling medical student, and a "sex only" arrangement with Tammy Jones, unbeknownst to Amera, Tammy's cousin.

== Cast ==
- RayMartell Moore as Faybien Allen
- Derrick L. Briggs as Lonnie Wilson
- J'Nara Corbin as Amera Jones
- Eugene E. Turner as Greg Marsh
- Maurice Murrell as Jaylen 'Jay' Timber
- Ron DeSuze as Wilmar Allen
- Eric Joppy as Reggie Hunt

== Reception ==
WBOC-TV gave the film a positive review and commented that it was "fun and funny, a finger-snapping, dulcetly down-low, romantic comedy."
