= The Natural History of Parking Lots =

- VHS cover
- Directed by: Everett Lewis
- Written by: Everett Lewis
- Produced by: Aziz Ghazal
- Starring: Charlie Bean; B. Wyatt; Charles Taylor
- Cinematography: Hisham Abed; Roy Unger
- Edited by: Everett Lewis
- Music by: Johannes Hammers
- Distributed by: Strand Releasing
- Release date: January 21, 1990 (United States Film Festival)
- Running time: 89 minutes
- Country: United States
- Language: English

The Natural History of Parking Lots is a 1990 American independent film written and directed by Everett Lewis. It tells the story of two estranged brothers who seek to reconcile their relationship against a background of criminal activity and violence. The film is Lewis' feature film debut.

== Plot ==
In Los Angeles the late 1980s, 17-year-old Chris is arrested for stealing a car. His distant father (who insists his sons call him "Sam" and not "Dad") arranges for him to be bailed into the custody of Chris's older brother, Lance. The brothers seem to bond, but there is the suspicion that Lance is merely using his newly-domestic situation as a cover for his real business, gun-running.

== Cast ==
- Charlie Bean as Chris
- B. Wyatt as Lance
- Charles Taylor as Sam
- Dean Cleverdon as Cop

== Reception ==
Critic Emanuel Levy said the film’s "visual style owes a lot to the early works of French New Wave". He added, "Mood and tone one are far more important than text or plot, which are slender, underdeveloped, often feeling arbitrary in the order which the sequences unfold and are presented. However, visually, the stylized black-and-white picture is impressive, courtesy of cinematographer Hisham Abed, compensating for the performances of Wyatt and Bean, which are decent but no more; Bean, in fact, has never acted before, but he’s blessed with a likable and vulnerable screen persona."

== Awards and nominations ==
The film was nominated for a 1991 Independent Spirit Award for Best First Feature. At the Torino International Film Festival the film won the Audience Award for Best Feature Film and the Prize of the City of Torino Award for Feature Film.
