= Skin & Bone (film) =

1996 film by Everett Lewis

- Film poster
- Directed by: Everett Lewis
- Written by: Everett Lewis
- Produced by: Claudia Hoover; Gardner Monks
- Starring: B. Wyatt; Alan Boyce; Nicole Dillenberg; Garret Scullin
- Cinematography: Fernando Argüelles
- Edited by: Everett Lewis
- Music by: Geoff Haba; Mark Jan Wlodarkiewicz
- Distributed by: Jour de Fête Films
- Release dates: June 22, 1996 (San Francisco International Lesbian and Gay Film Festival); September 25, 1998 (United States)
- Running time: 110 minutes
- Country: United States
- Language: English

Skin & Bone is a 1996 American crime drama film written and directed by Everett Lewis. It is the story of three Los Angeles-area hustlers, or male prostitutes, and their female pimp. The three men are at different stages of their hustling careers: Dean is just beginning; Billy is somewhat more experienced but still naive; and Harry actively wants to get out, and is looking to break into film acting. Ghislane, the pimp, sends each of the three young men into increasingly dangerous scenarios with clients, until both Billy and Harry are killed. The film stars B. Wyatt, Alan Boyce, Garret Scullin, and Nicole Dillenberg.

Lewis financed the film almost entirely, using money earned working on other films. Skin & Bone was originally intended to be entirely improvised, but after a year of filming Lewis decided to script some of it to add shape to the story. The film alternates between black and white and color, marking shifts between depictions of a character's fantasy and reality.

Critical responses to the film were mixed. Some reviewers thought it little more than pretentious titillation, while others praised the performances and direction and congratulated Lewis for raising some difficult questions.

== Plot ==
Skin & Bone is an episodic account of three Los Angeles-area hustlers, Harry, Billy, and Dean, and their pimp Ghislaine. Ghislaine constantly drives the streets of Los Angeles arranging client appointments. She relies on Harry, the most experienced member of her stable, to train new recruits, including Billy and Dean.

Harry services both male and female clients and always acts as a top; many male clients hire him to beat them. He fantasizes about a woman he once knew. He has convinced himself that he is not a prostitute but an "actor" providing "fantasies". In his unsuccessful pursuit of an acting career, Harry goes on a casting call for a police film. The casting director asks if he will do nudity, implying a casting couch scenario. Harry says he is an artist and loses the role.

Billy, though experienced, is still somewhat goofy and absent-minded. He sometimes helps Harry with scenes and Harry tries to convince him too that he is an actor and not a prostitute. On several occasions, Billy picks up men only to discover that the man is not actually his client. In one case he and the man fall in love and they plan to get Billy out of the business and start a life together. Shortly thereafter, Billy mistakes a man for a client in a public restroom and that man stabs him to death.

Dean is Ghislaine's most recent recruit. While training him, Harry again tries to impart the notion that their job is just acting. Following his training and first successful trick (with a woman), Dean is humiliated when two women force him to start and stop masturbating seemingly at random. Dean then performs as a "nude cleaner" for a client. He learns that the client is an ex-Marine who was paralyzed in combat and still longs for the boy with whom he fell in love, who was killed. The client is still able to achieve an erection and Dean has sex with him.

Harry is at an appointment with a regular, a uniform fetishist called "The General" (Wynston A. Jones). Usually Harry beats him, but unknown to Harry, the client has arranged for something different with Ghislaine. After showing Harry a picture of himself in which he closely resembles Harry, the General orders Harry to strip. When Harry hesitates, the General attacks him from behind, binds his hands with tape and rapes him.

Harry asks his acting agent to set up an "interview" with another casting director. He lets the man fuck him. Later at Dean's place, Harry finds Dean sitting alone burning himself with a cigarette. Dean tells Harry he ran away from home after his father had him arrested at age 14 for stealing a candy bar. Dean was put in a cell with several men who took turns raping him.

After allowing himself to be used by the casting director, Harry gets a small role as a cop in the film for which he had previously been rejected. On-set he impresses the producers and they offer him a part in a TV series.

Ghislaine sends Harry to the local morgue with $2,500 to bribe an attendant. Harry sees Billy's body and realizes that Ghislaine is acquiring it for a client. He confronts Ghislaine, accusing her of arranging Billy's murder, and tells her he wants to quit and take Dean with him. Ghislaine agrees, if Harry and Dean perform one final scene.

The scene is a cop/prisoner scenario which begins with the cop beating the prisoner then the prisoner overpowering the cop, binding and beating and finally shooting him. Harry plays the cop and Dean the prisoner. Bound and gagged, Harry sees Ghislaine switching his gun (loaded with blanks) for another gun, but fails to convey the danger to Dean. As Ghislaine and the client watch and the client tapes the scene, Dean pulls the trigger and kills Harry. Harry meets "Lovely Girl", who asks him how he feels being dead.

Six months later, Dean is living on the streets. Ghislaine finds him and convinces him to return to work.

== Cast ==
- B. Wyatt as Harry
- Alan Boyce as Dean
- Nicole Dillenberg as Ghislaine
- Garret Scullin as Billy
- Chad Kula as Bruno
- Susannah Melvoin as lovely girl
- Clark Heathcliff Brolly (credited as Clark Heathcliffe Brolly) as Frankie
- Gregory Sporleder as Habadasher
- Richard Mitrani as Herb, the photographer
- Chris Wetzel as Ricky, his assistant
- Michael Nehring as Michael, Harry's manager
- Michael Haynes as Billy's killer
- Greg Jackson as Mr. Donut Audition
- Chris Reahm as Satanic youth star
- Andrea Beane as Junkie with pierced nipples

== Themes ==
Reviewers agree that Skin & Bone is as much about Los Angeles and the film industry as it is about prostitution or even homosexuality. Writing in Bright Lights Film Journal, critic Gary Morris suggests that the film is "inevitably set in Los Angeles, amid that city's arid strip malls, newsstands, and endless dusty streets" and he points to the significance of Ghislaine's constant movement through the city, "looking glamorous and inscrutable in her opaque sunglasses".

For Anita Gates of The New York Times, "the film's strongest message" is "a questioning of the actor's trade." For Gates, the film comes to sympathize with Harry's notion that prostitutes are in fact actors, or perhaps vice versa: "Mr. Lewis's point seems to be that it's all the same. What's the big difference, he asks, between acting out the fantasies of one rich old man or those of a few million ticket buyers?"

Lewis himself seems to give some weight to these interpretations when he describes Skin & Bone as being about "giving your soul away and rationalizing the loss as a bonus", and as a metaphor "for the experiences I suffered attempting to make a film at an evil film company."

== Production and style ==
Lewis became interested in making a film about hustlers because (despite there being films about hustlers dating back more than three decades) he had never seen such a film. In Lewis's own words, "When I started, there were no hustler movies and now there's a whole genre." His original concept for Skin & Bone was that it would be a series of 70 one-minute shots. Lewis changed his mind about the concept following some improvisation with actor B. Wyatt in creating the Harry character. Much of the film was improvised. After a year of filming improvisation sessions, Lewis wrote some scripted material to provide some story structure. Shooting took several years to complete because the film was almost entirely self-financed.

The film alternates between color and black and white sequences. Black and white usually denotes that the scene involves one or more of the hustlers engaged with a client, and indicates that one or more of the characters (not necessarily the client) is fantasizing. But the scheme is not always consistent: for example, when Dean has sex with the paralyzed client the scene is in color; and Harry also has an S/M scene that's all in color (although his client never appears on-screen). Equally, Harry's fantasies about "Lovely Girl" (who is apparently dead) are occasionally in color. In their final scene, Harry and Dean are in black and white, but when the client and Ghislaine are shown watching they're in color, raising the question of exactly who is having the fantasy. According to Lewis, the convention grew out of the fact that the initial improvised sequences were shot in black and white; he acknowledges that by the end the distinction had become "very confused."

The film features a number of songs by the queercore band Pansy Division. David Arquette has a cameo appearance as "Buzz Head", one of Ghislaine's regular clients. Arquette himself played a hustler in the film Johns, also released in 1996.

== Critical reception ==
Reviews for Skin & Bone were decidedly mixed. The New York Times called it a "bleak, disjointed movie" that "often comes across as if it had been planned like a pornographic feature." Director Lewis is praised, however, for "effectively mix[ing] us up as to what's real and what isn't." Bright Lights Film Journal had stronger words of praise for the film, calling it "intense [and] sometimes unsettling" with a "conceptual richness and mocking wit", while also noting the "element of genuine pathos [that] runs beneath the sardonic wit and brutal, sometimes lethal sex."

The Village Voice was much more dismissive, panning the film as "fitfully comic, pitifully pretentious soap opera [that] runs out of promise so quickly that only the most tenacious (or desperate) viewers will hang on till the sorry end." Echoing the Voice, TV Guide, while praising Lewis's "icy style", nonetheless suggests that the film is a half-hour too long and "doesn't really offer much to justify its existence beyond the obvious titillation."

One near-unanimous critical note concerns Nicole Dillenberg's performance as Ghislaine. While the actors playing the three hustlers are variously described as "really quite competent" and "game, gesturally hip and highly empathic", Dillenberg is judged "too callow for Ghislaine" and "stiffly plying monotonous attitude in lieu of creating a real character, rather like a female impersonation of female impersonator Jackie Beat."

== See also ==
- Male prostitution in the arts
