= Justin Herwick =

American actor (born 1970)

- Born: June 27, 1970 (age 56); Cerritos, California, U.S.
- Occupation: Actor
- Years active: 1994–2002
- Children: 1

Justin Herwick (born June 27, 1970) is an American former actor. He is best known for his role as Jackson in Everett Lewis's 2002 film Luster.

== Personal life ==
Herwick and actress Nicole Eggert have a daughter together, born in 1998. In a 2014 interview, Eggert mentioned that they were never married despite internet rumors to the contrary.

== Filmography ==
- 1994: Cityscrapes: Los Angeles as Ben
- 1997: C-16: FBI as Orange Kid (TV series)
- 1997: As Good as It Gets as a street hustler
- 1998: Broken Vessels as Mike
- 2002: Luster as Jackson
