= You'll Get Over It =

2002 French film

- Theatrical release poster (France)
- Directed by: Fabrice Cazeneuve
- Written by: Vincent Molina
- Produced by: Hervé Chabalier; Claude Chelli; Christophe Chevallier
- Starring: Julien Baumgartner; Jérémie Elkaïm
- Cinematography: Stephan Massis
- Edited by: Jean-Pierre Bloc
- Release date: March 13, 2002
- Running time: 90 minutes
- Country: France
- Language: French

You'll Get Over It (French: À cause d'un garçon) is a gay-themed coming of age film released in 2002. The literal translation of the French title is Because of a Boy.

== Plot ==
Vincent (Baumgartner) is a shy boy who is on the swim team and is also a good student with his girlfriend Noémie (Maraval) and a best friend, Stéphane (Comar), life in school can't be better for him. But then, he suddenly starts to have encounters with the new boy, Benjamin (Elkaïm). They have a private meeting and then some boys write on a wall "Molina is a fag". Vincent starts getting bullied at high school, changing his life and his relationships with family and friends in ways he will have to accept.

== Cast ==
- Julien Baumgartner as Vincent Molina
- Julia Maraval as Noémie
- Jérémie Elkaïm as Benjamin
- François Comar as Stéphane
- Patrick Bonnel as Bernard, the Father
- Christiane Millet as Sylvie
- Antoine Michel as Régis, the Brother
- Nils Ohlund as Bruno
- Bernard Blancan as Swimming Coach
- Eric Bonicatto as French Professor

== Reception ==
Reviewing the translated version released in the United States in 2004, Dave Kehr of the New York Times called the film "well-meaning and hopelessly bland".
