= Jack Curtis Dubowsky =

American composer

Jack Curtis Dubowsky is an American composer and author who has composed music for film, chorus, and concert performance. His music has been performed by the San Francisco Choral Artists, the Lesbian/Gay Chorus of San Francisco, Elevate Ensemble, and others.

Dubowsky is a 2023-24 Professional Artist Fellow of the Arts Council for Long Beach. He has received grants from American Composers Forum (2009), Meet the Composer (1998), the Zellerbach Family Fund (1997), and the Friends of the San Francisco Public Library (1997), and a "Special Recognition of a Score" jury award from the Fire Island Gay and Lesbian Film Festival (2002) for his work on the film Under One Roof. Dubowsky works through his music house, De Stijl Music.

He has a BA in Communication from UCLA and a Master of Music degree in Composition from the San Francisco Conservatory of Music.

== Books ==
- Intersecting Film, Music, and Queerness (2016)
- Easy Listening and Film Scoring 1948-78 (2021)
- Composing for Silent Film (2024)

== Discography ==
- Diazepam Nights (1989)
- Helot Revolt (1992)
- Robbie D - The Fertile Boy (1993) - (guitar)
- That Man: Peter Berlin OST (2005)
- Rock Haven OST (2007)
- Redwoods OST (2009)
- I Always Said Yes OST (2013)
- Steven Arnold: Heavenly Bodies OST (2019)
- Bolsa Chica Calm (2022)
- Halloween Horror (2022)
- Log Off Now (2023)

== Concert Works ==
- Quaker Peace Testimony (2007)
- Eisenhower Farewell Address (2008)
- Halloween in the Castro (Opera) (2009)
- Harvey Milk: A Cantata (2012)
