= The Week International =

Brazilian LGBTQ nightclub

Coordinates: 23°31′21″S 46°41′20″W

The Week International (Brazilian Portuguese: [ˈdɛ ˈwik(i) ˌĩteʁˈnɛʃõnaw], often just referred to as The Week) is an after hours LGBTQ nightclub located in the city of São Paulo, Brazil. It opened in September 2004. Other branches were opened in Rio de Janeiro and Florianópolis.
