= Sean Thibodeau =

American actor

Sean Thibodeau is an actor, writer, director, producer, blogger and entrepreneur.

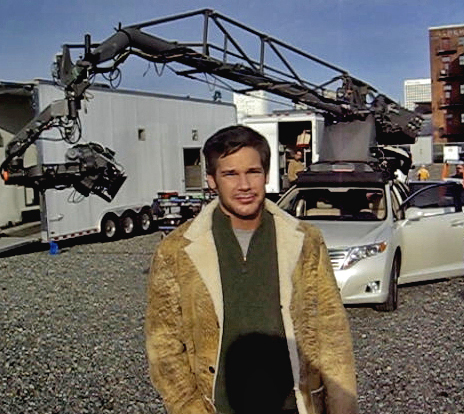
Sean Thibodeau on set of 2010 Indie Film

== Filmography ==
- 1997: Allyson Is Watching as Peter
- 2000: An Unkindness of Ravens as Simon Reese
- 2000: Big Momma's House as Jud
- 2000: The Ladies Man as Hugh Hefner
- 2001: FreakyLinks in episode "Police Siren" as Earl Woodley (TV series)
- 2002: Luster as Derek

== In popular culture ==
Sean Thibodeau appeared on the cover of a number of lifestyle and fashion magazines, as well as a number of advertising campaigns for print and television.

Sean Thibodeau was named to IMDB's list of "The 50 Hottest Actors" in 2011.

Sean Thibodeau was also named to IMDB's list of "40 Hot Men Hollywood Should be Using More."
