= Ben and Arthur =

- DVD cover
- Directed by: Sam Mraovich
- Written by: Sam Mraovich
- Produced by: Sam Mraovich
- Starring: Sam Mraovich; Jamie Brett Gabel; Michael Haboush; Bill Hindley; Julie Belknap; Gina Aguilar
- Cinematography: Michael Haboush; Sam Mraovich
- Edited by: Chris Mraovich; Sam Mraovich
- Music by: Phil Garcia; Michael Haboush; Chris Mraovich; Robert Mraovich; Sam Mraovich; Louis Matta
- Distributed by: Ariztical Entertainment
- Release date: September 9, 2002
- Running time: 85 minutes
- Country: United States
- Language: English
- Box office: $40,000

Ben and Arthur is a 2002 American romantic-drama film written, directed, and produced by Sam Mraovich, and distributed by Ariztical Entertainment. The film concerns a recently married gay couple who face opposition from one partner's brother, who plots to murder them after being ostracized by his church.

The film was a box office bomb, having earned only $40,000 as of 2011, and is considered by some to be one of the worst movies ever made.

== Plot ==
Ben Sheets and Arthur Sailes are a couple in Los Angeles, desiring to get married, in a time in the USA when gay marriage was illegal in all 50 states. When one state makes gay marriage legal, the couple decide to go there and get married, which creates consequences with Arthur's brother, Victor, who then becomes obsessed with destroying them both.

== Cast ==
- Sam Mraovich as Arthur Sailes
- Jamie Brett Gabel as Ben Sheets
- Michael Haboush as Victor Sailes
- Bill Hindley as Rabin
- Julie M. Zimmerman as Tammy Sheets (billed as Julie Belknap)
- Gina Aguilar as Margaret
- Arthur Huber as Justin Abraham, Victor's private investigator
- Oto Brezina as the Vermont priest who officiates Ben and Arthur's wedding
- Richard Hitchcock as Stan, Victor's friend who helps with his plot against Ben and Arthur
- Bruce Lurie as Investigator Morren
- Buck Elkin as a bar owner
- Nick Bennet as Scott
- Loretta Altman as Mildred
- Holly Mraovich as a lady in a grocery store scene

== Production ==
Produced and shot in Los Angeles.

== Release ==
The film premiered at the Sunset 5 theater in West Hollywood. As of 2011, the film has only earned $40,000, making it a box office bomb.

=== Home media ===
Ben and Arthur was released on Region 1 DVD in the United States by Ariztical Entertainment on April 13, 2004, and was re-released on January 24, 2018, through Amazon Prime, but both are now out of print. On February 1, 2017, the film was made available online to rent or buy on Vimeo through Ariztical Entertainment.

== Reception ==
Rotten Tomatoes' editorial staff ranked it #15 on its list of "Films So Bad They're Unmissable", stating "If Tommy Wiseau's The Room is the over-wrought, melodramatic and self-pitying heterosexual camp classic of choice, then Sam Mraovich's Ben & Arthur is its gay equivalent." Rotten Tomatoes cited the poor production values and Arthur's "hissy fits", concluding that the quality of the film was so poor that "Mraovich might as well have shot his story of gay persecution and fightback on a cell phone". Pop culture review site insert-disc likewise compared it to The Room, stating "The Room was better than this. The acting, special effects, music, and writing are bad even compared to 'The Room.'" Total Film included Ben and Arthur on its list of the 66 worst films of all time. Netflix reviews have been negative. One review wrote "I rarely get angry at a movie, this is an exception."

The film also took particular criticism from the gay community: The gay pop culture site Queerty called it "the worst gay movie ever", only to later retract the "gay" qualifier and simply declare it the worst in general. The gay film review site Cinemaqueer indicated that it was the worst film to have ever been featured on the site, suggesting that the film was too bad to even be parodied on Mystery Science Theater 3000.

== See also ==
- List of 21st century films considered the worst
