= FAQs (film) =

- American DVD cover
- Directed by: Everett Lewis
- Written by: Everett Lewis
- Produced by: Christian Martin
- Starring: Joe Lia; Allan Louis; Lance Lee Davis; Josh Paul; Minerva Vier
- Cinematography: Gavin Kelly
- Edited by: Everett Lewis
- Music by: William V. Malpede
- Distributed by: TLA Releasing
- Release dates: July 16, 2005 (Philadelphia International Gay & Lesbian Film Festival); February 8, 2006 (United States)
- Running time: 88 minutes
- Country: United States
- Language: English

FAQs is a 2005 LGBT-themed independent film written and directed by Everett Lewis. The film tells the story of a group of young queer kids who have been discarded by straight society. They come together to form a de facto family under the wing of an African American vigilante drag queen named Destiny.

FAQs premiered at the 2005 Philadelphia International Gay & Lesbian Film Festival and had a limited theatrical release in 2006. While mainstream critics praised a number of the performances and certain aspects of the film, generally critical response was negative.

== Plot ==
After filming a porn video and being ripped off by the producer (Arthur Roberts), India (Joe Lia) meets a street hustler. Moments later they are attacked by a pair of gay bashers. They split up and run and the bashers pursue India in their Jeep. They stop short at the sight of India standing next to Destiny (Allan Louis) a vigilante African American drag queen pointing a gun at them. Destiny vandalizes the Jeep and takes the coat from one of the bashers. Destiny invites the homeless India to live with her. There he meets Lester (Minerva Vier), a young lesbian and another of Destiny's "orphans."

The next morning, upon learning that Destiny is a porn director India panics and plans to leave. He tells Destiny about being ripped off and she asks if he wants to kill the producer. He says yes, and that he wants to kill all straight people. India goes to the producer's home with a gun. He finds the producer and pulls the trigger, but the gun is not loaded.

A few days later, as they discuss plans to foment the collapse of the straight world, Destiny, India and Lester meet Spencer (Lance Lee Davis), a graffiti artist and self-proclaimed "bomber," They immediately "adopt" him. After spending the night together, Spencer and India discover the basher's address inside his coat and decide they want to go bash him.

As Destiny and her friend Matinee (Tara Nova) socialize in Destiny's car, Officer Vic Damone (Vince Parenti) comes to warn them that the police are on the lookout for roving bands of vigilante drag queens and to watch out for themselves. Destiny (realizing that Vic is attracted to her) advises him that they're already always watching out for themselves.

Spencer and India are approached on the street by a photographer. As the pair pose together nude on a bed, Spencer recites a litany of injuries he has received at the hands of his parents and other straights. India tries to comfort him but Spencer says he no longer has feelings and doesn't let anyone in. India vows to protect him from the straights.

The next morning, on the way to the basher's house, India discovers a detonator in Spencer's backpack. Spencer tells him that he plans to blow up his parents. India tries to dissuade him but Spencer is not convinced that bombing straights isn't the way to go.

India and Spencer spot the basher in his neighborhood and argue over whether they should bash him as Spencer wants or try to "save" him as India wants. India has adopted Destiny's theory, that all gay bashers are themselves repressed gays who need to be saved.

India returns the basher's jacket. The basher, Guy (Adam Larson), admits that he's gay. He packs his things and tells the other basher, his roommate Quentin (Josh Paul) that he's gay, he loves him and believes Quentin loves him too.

Quentin has a gun to his head, contemplating suicide, but is interrupted by his brother. Quentin angrily acknowledges that he is gay and drives away.

Destiny tells Vic she's in love with him and Vic tells Destiny he's in love with her too. As Vic leaves for work, he passes India, Spencer and Guy with his gun pointed in their general direction. They confront Destiny about being involved with a cop, until Destiny realizes who Guy is and orders him out. India and Spencer threaten to leave with him, but Guy agrees to go. India appeals to Destiny and she relents. India and Spencer chase after him but can't find him. Meanwhile, Guy returns to the apartment and apologizes for attacking them. Destiny accepts him and Lester nicknames him "Killer."

India wants to make plans for the evening with Spencer but Spencer already has plans, to blow up his parents. India begs him not to go, saying that he won't come back from it.

Destiny interrupts another gay bashing. The basher strikes her with a baseball bat and Destiny shoots him. Later, Vic comforts her and Destiny tells him he has to be careful around her kids. They all have "police stories."

Quentin, in response to a message from Guy, arrives at Destiny's apartment, where he finds Guy in bed with India and Spencer. Quentin orders him to come away with him, giving him the choice of "straight or dead." The boys argue that Quentin is in love with Guy and Quentin breaks down, admitting how much in love with Guy he is. Quentin again points the gun at his own head but Guy stops him and they kiss.

India appeals again to Spencer not to blow up his parents. He says that if Spencer really wants to kill them, he will help, but if Spencer really wants to blow them away, he will stay with India. "All we have to do is kiss, because when two guys kiss it's like a bomb going off in the straight world. Our kisses are louder than bombs." Spencer admits that he has fallen in love with India but is terrified because he's losing control. But he also feels safe, like he's home. India tells him that wherever they are, as long as they are together they're home. They kiss, and with each kiss they call out a target that their kiss has destroyed like a bomb, finally declaring that they will blow up the whole straight world.

== Cast ==
- Joe Lia as India
- Allan Louis as Destiny
- Lance Lee Davis as Spencer
- Adam Larson as Guy
- Josh Paul as Quentin
- Arthur Roberts as Pornographer
- Minerva Vier as Lester
- Vince Parenti as Officer Vic Damone
- Tara Nova as Matinee

== Critical response ==
FAQs was generally poorly received by mainstream critics. The Los Angeles Times, while calling Louis' Destiny a "striking mix of Grace Jones and Catwoman," found that the "campier aspects are not enough to make up for its lapses into melodrama and just plain silliness." The Philadelphia City Paper largely concurred, finding the film hard to take seriously with its premise that every gay basher is really a closet homosexual and the concept of Destiny's character completely unbelievable. While finding a "reasonable tale" in Lewis' story and praising the performances, particularly those of Louis and Lia, nonetheless the conclusion is that the film is "awash in aimless, campless hyperbole and hysteria." The LA Weekly offered kudos to Lewis for his "adept[ness] at modulating both tension and free-flowing interpersonal relationships" and praising cinematographer Kelly, but notes that the film "seems less comfortable in its own skin than his other work...the dialogue is blunter, and harder for his amateur cast to pull off, while Lewis’ stridency, however justified, ultimately jars against the film's tender, all-is-love fantasia."
