= Antoine Michel =

French actor

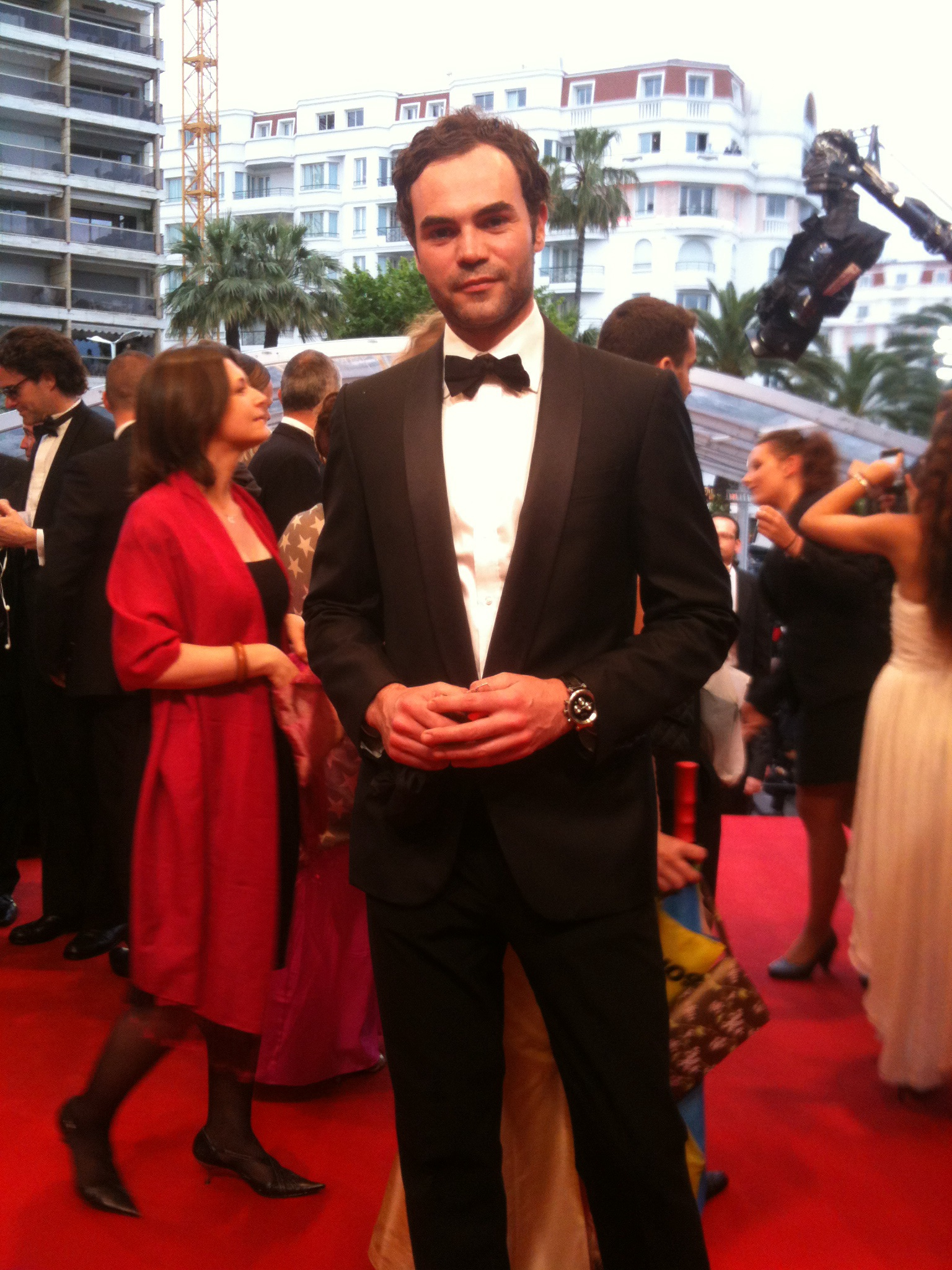
- Born: Paris, France
- Occupation: Actor
- Years active: 2000–present

Antoine Michel is a French actor.

Originating from Paris, France, Michel has been featured in commercials and magazine ads since he was five. As a teenager, he toured all of France in various theatre companies.

His breakthrough role came in 2002 in Fabrice Cazeneuve's film You'll Get Over It.

Antoine, now works regularly in films and TV series mostly in France.

He is best known for playing intense characters like the boxer in You'll Get Over It, the Jihadist in L'Equilibre de la Terreur or the psychopath in Meurtres à Rocamadour.

== Filmography ==
- 2002 You'll Get Over It by Fabrice Cazeneuve : Régis Molina
- 2004 Péril Imminent: Mortel Chahut by Arnaud Sélignac : the big master
- 2006 L'Equilibre de la Terreur by Jean-Martial Lefranc : Gérard-Ahmed Assam
- 2008 Et + si @ff (en tout bien, tout bonheur) de Paul Vecchiali : Philippe Dessaix
- 2010 The Names of Love de Michel Leclerc : the photographer
- 2010 Une famille formidable de Joel Santoni : the model
- 2010 Profilage épisode l'age sombre : Antoine Chassagne
- 2010 Gossip girl : Serena's French date
- 2011 Poupoupidou by Gérald Hustache-Mathieu; fireman
- 2013 Dernier recours épisode "Dangereuses visions" de Adeline Darraux : Rémi de Martignac
- 2014 Meurtres à Rocamadour de Lionel Bailliu : Olivier Granville
- 2014 Piste Noire by Jalil Naciri; Paul
- 2015 : Toute première fois de Maxime Govare, Noémie Saglio : ami d'Antoine
- 2016 : Plus belle la vie : Cédric Watt (13 épisodes)
- 2016 : Les Mystères de l'amour : Adrien Nabette
- 2016 : The Bureau : le technicien de la DT
- 2017 : Agathe Koltès : Tristan Wichniak
- 2019 : Balthazar : Mr Tissandier
- 2020 : Le Réseau Shelburn de Nicolas Guillou : Raymond Labrosse
- 2020 : Alice Nevers: Le juge est une femme : Jean-Noël Normand (2épisodes)
- 2025: Love Me Tender
