= Under One Roof (film) =

- Directed by: Todd Wilson
- Written by: David Lewis
- Produced by: Chris Chung
- Starring: Jay Wong; James Marks; Sandra Lee; James Quedado
- Cinematography: Dan Schmeltzer
- Edited by: Todd Wilson
- Music by: Jack Curtis Dubowsky
- Distributed by: TLA Releasing (video)
- Release date: May 25, 2002
- Running time: 76 minutes
- Country: United States
- Languages: English; Chinese

Under One Roof is a 2002 independent gay-themed romance film directed by Todd Wilson and starring Jay Wong, James Marks, Sandra Lee, and starring James Quedado. Shot on digital video, the film tells the story of a young gay Chinese-American man's search for true love and family acceptance within a framework of traditional norms. Under One Roof played worldwide at LGBTQ film festivals following its release.

== Plot ==
Daniel Chang (Wong) is a twenty-something second-generation Chinese-American living at home in San Francisco with his widowed mother, who can speak broken English, and his grandmother (his father's mother), who cannot speak English. Ever since his father died, he has fulfilled his patriarchal duty as first and only son by managing the family business and looking after his mother. Being gay, he avoids the second major responsibility of carrying on the family line through heterosexual marriage and reproduction. Out of respect for his mother's values, he tries to keep, as he puts it, his home life and his "homo life" separate. By not directly telling his mother that he is gay, he has unwittingly found himself in a tense but hilarious situation where his mother continually pressures him to marry women of her choosing. Luckily, Daniel's female friend, Michelle, graciously rescues him from the constant onslaught of potential dates by pretending to be his steady girlfriend (for a price), which deflects his need to come out to his mother.

Besides the extra money Mrs. Chang makes playing Mahjong, she also rents out the basement illegally. Daniel relates how he was quite happy to leave the previous female tenant alone. Daniel expects his mother to replace the previous tenant with another woman and is astounded when the new tenant turns out to be Robert, a young attractive white man from Indiana. Daniel immediately has a crush on him. Following a plumbing mishap that floods the basement with raw sewage, Mrs. Chang apologetically moves Robert into the only other bedroom that is not hers—Daniel's room. Even though reality has merged with Daniel's deepest fantasies, he bows to the paranoia that his mother will find out he is gay and decides to sleep on the living room sofa. Mrs. Chang eventually kicks Daniel off the couch so she can watch her late-night TV programs, and he is forced to share his bed with Robert. Daniel manages to be prudish for a few nights but eventually the two become lovers.

Daniel's fear of being caught making out with a man constantly gets in between his relationship with Robert, and Daniel begins to wish that the basement repairs would finish soon so they could move their lovemaking to a safer area. However, one day Mrs. Chang and Grandma return home earlier than expected right in the middle of one of Daniel and Robert's trysts. Grandma walks in on them during copulation to offer them mooncakes, one of the few English words she knows. She sheepishly leaves the mooncakes on the nightstand and exits, giving them enough time to roll apart to opposite sides of the bed just as Mrs. Chang walks in. Daniel quickly chastises her for not knocking and makes up the excuse that he was napping. Mrs. Chang does not seem to notice that both he and Robert are naked, but she bluntly tells Robert to move his belongings back into the basement that night.

With the basement repaired, Daniel imagines he can finally spend time with Robert away from his mother's prying eyes, but the very next day a San Francisco building inspector stops by. Daniel suspects his own mother called the inspector, who gives the Chang's a list of expensive home improvements that would be needed to legally rent the room. Mrs. Chang jumps at the chance, arguing with Daniel that she has no choice but to make Robert move out. Their argument echoes in the basement and Robert hears Daniel give in without too much of a fight. Heartbroken, Robert moves away to a friend's place in Pasadena.

Daniel reaches his breaking point. Miserable and determined not to be alone forever, he comes out to his mother the very next time she starts talking about available young women. This time he is direct and asserts that he wants to be with Robert. Mrs. Chang reacts angrily, lecturing Daniel in her native tongue and storming away from him. In her confusion, disappointment and fear of losing Daniel (who threatened to move out), she turns to the only other woman she knows with a gay son, Robert's mother. Robert's mother asks Mrs. Chang if it wouldn't be so bad to have another son, a clever way of getting around the cultural taboo of same-sex love. Shortly thereafter, Mrs. Chang calls Daniel back home to meet another potential date. Daniel flips out and races back home to stand up to his mother for the last time. He opens the door bellowing out, "Mother!" but almost chokes from surprise when Robert walks toward him instead. Mrs. Chang had invited Robert to be part of their family.

== Cast ==
- Jay Wong as Daniel Chang
- James Marks as Robert
- Sandra Lee as Mrs. Chang
- James Quedado as Tony
- Audrey Finer as Mrs. Watson
- Vivian Kobayashi as Gram Chang
- Trish Ng as Amy
- Sina Eiden as Rachel
- Erik Ing as Jason
- Xin Feng Lin as Plumber
- Ken Craig as Randy
- Leslie MacKay as Nude BBQ Guest
- Christopher Stout as Nude BBQ Guest
- Wyman Chang as Henry
- Dianne Cragg as Fortune Teller

== Home media ==
Under One Roof was released on Region 1 DVD on April 8, 2003.
