= Luster (film) =

- promotional poster
- Directed by: Everett Lewis
- Written by: Everett Lewis
- Produced by: Robert Shulevitz
- Starring: Justin Herwick; Shane Powers; B. Wyatt; Pamela Gidley; Jonah Blechman; Willie Garson
- Edited by: Everett Lewis
- Music by: Garret Scullin; Mark Kreistl
- Distributed by: TLA Releasing
- Release date: March 17, 2002
- Running time: 90 minutes
- Country: United States
- Language: English

Luster is a 2002 American drama film written and directed by Everett Lewis. The film is about a weekend in the lives of a group of friends in the Los Angeles queer punk scene. Lewis sought to "infuse queerness" into the film as much as he could, so he cast a number of non-heterosexual actors and used music by a number of queer punk bands. Critical response to Luster was deeply divided.

== Plot ==
Luster takes place over a weekend in Los Angeles.

=== Friday ===
Jackson wakes up in the aftermath of an orgy and heads to his job at his friend Sam's alternative record store. At the store he gets a call from Sonny Spike. On his way out the door, Jackson runs into customer Derek, who professes his love at first sight.

Jackson meets Sonny at his hotel and Sonny asks him to write the lyrics for Sonny's next album. Stoked, Jackson stops back at his house where he finds his cousin Jed in the shower, which immediately inspires thoughts of incest. Jackson and Jed head back to the store, just in time to head out to a book signing by Kurt Domain with Sam (who, sadly, leaves friend Alyssa behind).

At the book signing, Jackson runs into Billy, who he'd met at last night's orgy. Jackson professes his love at first sight for Billy, who agrees to have coffee but flatly informs Jackson he won't have sex with him. The author spots Jed, and, taking him as his muse, writes a piece on Jed's body.

=== Saturday morning ===
Jackson, inspired by Jed, writes several poems. Meanwhile, Jed is in the desert, serving as muse to yet a third artist, Alyssa. A bloodied Billy calls Jackson at the record store. Jackson picks him up and takes him home. Billy explains that his ex-lover sexually tortured him.

Leaving Billy to sleep, Jackson gives his poems to Sonny, who thinks they're great but changes the sex of the subjects to female. Jed returns to Jackson's place and crawls into bed next to Billy. Jackson goes back to work, where Derek is waiting for him. Derek again professes his love. Jackson explains he doesn't feel the same but they kiss anyway. Jackson drives Derek home.

Alyssa takes her photos of Jed to a gallery and lands a showing in New York City.

Billy wakes up next to Jed and engages in some sexual torture of his own. Sonny decides he must meet Jackson's inspiration and sends a private investigator to get him. The P.I. finds Billy and brings him to Sonny. It was Sonny who had tortured Billy previously. Billy tells Sonny that he tortured someone that morning and realized that he hated it and that he wants to enslave himself to Sonny.

Sam visits his mother and surprises her with the news that he's paid off her mortgage.

Jackson returns home and finds Jed handcuffed in the shower.

=== Saturday night ===
Sam, Jackson and Jed go on a bar crawl through the city. Jackson runs into Sonny and Billy in the restroom of one bar and beats Billy up for what he did to Jed. Sonny gets turned on by it. When Jackson leaves the bar, Sam and Jed are arguing over Sam's unrequited love for someone. Sam drops Jackson and Jed off at Jackson's and gives Jed a videotape to give to Jackson. Jed goes inside and he and Jackson have sex.

=== Sunday morning ===
Jackson takes Jed to the airport for his flight back to Iowa. Jed tells him about the tape. Jackson returns home to find Alyssa and her girlfriend Sandra, who tell him that Sam has killed himself. On the tape, Sam says he's in love with Jackson. He knows he'll never be able to be with Jackson the way he wants to and that he has a lot of pain because of that. Distraught, Jackson runs all the way to Derek's place before the tape even ends. He has Derek reassure him that Derek loves him. Jackson strips naked and tells Derek "I'm all yours." Jackson says he doesn't know if he loves Derek but he does think Derek's pretty special, and special is "pretty fuckin' good."

== Cast ==
- Justin Herwick as Jackson: a frustrated punk poet and zine writer
- Shane Powers as Sam: Owner of an alternative record store and Jackson's boss and friend
- B. Wyatt as Jed: Jackson's cousin from Iowa
- Pamela Gidley as Alyssa: a lesbian photographer who is inspired by Jed
- Susannah Melvoin as Sandra: Alyssa's girlfriend
- Willie Garson as Sonny Spike: a closeted gay rock star
- Jonah Blechman as Billy: a young man who becomes infatuated with Sonny
- Sean Thibodeau as Derek: a mainstream gay man who falls for Jackson
- Henriette Mantel as Sam's Mom
- Norman Reedus as Sextools Delivery Boy
- Chris Freeman as Kurt Domain

== Critical response ==
Critical reaction to Luster was sharply divided. TV Guide, while calling the film "refreshing" for its presentation of "even slightly edgy images of gay life that have nothing to do with Will & Grace or Queer Eye for the Straight Guy" nonetheless criticized the film for being "overloaded with too many extraneous characters" and for the Billy/Sonny subplot, calling it "more disturbing than warranted." The New York Times dismissed the film as "relentlessly bright and superficial, even when the subject turns to self-destruction. It's as if the filmmaker, along with most of his characters, had taken too many self-esteem seminars at the local Learning Exchange." The Hollywood Reporter concurred, calling Luster "[r]oughly made and unevenly acted" with little in the way of storyline. "The lack of a meaningful story would be easier to take if the dialogue was wittier or the characterizations were deeper, but the proceedings are instead surprisingly bland considering the outrageousness of many of the situations."

Conversely, the Los Angeles Times said that Luster "lives up to its title as a fresh, bittersweet look at the pursuit of love..." populated by "attractive, appealing people." The reviewer further states Luster has a "charming, skittish quality, and Lewis finds pathos and humor in his characters' often painful search for love. There are moments in which the actors seem a bit self-conscious, yet this low-budget picture is a calling card for pretty much everyone in front of the camera." Although less effusive than the Times, the Village Voice approved of Lewis' direction, saying he "nailed the milieu," and complimented the film as an "endearingly saccharine queer melodrama." Variety echoed these sentiments, citing the film's sharp pace, "colorful yet realistic" design and good performances in declaring that Lewis "juggles a quite ambitious mix of tonal, character and narrative left-turns here, and it's much to his credit that the results -- while somewhat uneven -- really do pull together as Luster proceeds."

== Production and artistic intent ==
Director Everett Lewis wanted to "infuse queerness" as deeply as possible into Luster. To that end, he populated his cast with a number of LGBT actors and filled the soundtrack with music from LGBT punk and queercore bands, most notably Pansy Division. Lewis used the poetry of gay writer Dennis Cooper (including the first poem Cooper ever wrote, about David Cassidy) as Jackson's poetry. Jackson reads the final poem in voice-over over a solid blue screen, a reference and tribute to Derek Jarman's final film, Blue.

== Home media ==
Luster was released on Region 1 DVD on December 9, 2003. The DVD includes a commentary track by Lewis and noted independent filmmaker Robert Shulevitz and a featurette interview with Lewis entitled "Lewis on Film".
