= Circuit party =

Large dance event

Circuit party (disco party)

General Information
- Related genres: Electronic music, disco, electronic dance music, house music, techno
- Location: Worldwide
- Related events: Music festival, rave, electronic dance music festivals, teknival, technoparade
- Related topics: Live electronic music, LGBT culture, clubbing

A circuit party is a large dance event. It extends through the night and into the following day, almost always with a number of affiliated events in the days leading up to and following the main event. Proto-circuit parties in the late 1970s, the precursors of what later became circuit parties, were called disco parties. They lasted only one evening and were held in various large venues in metropolitan areas with large gay populations.

Circuit parties were first developed in connection with the early tea dances, attended by a subset of gay men, as well as theme parties held on Fire Island and The Hamptons on Long Island. They came to resemble underground rave parties in some respects, but differ in that circuit parties are highly publicized and professionally produced, and tend to attract people from a wider age range and a broader geographic area.

== Background ==
=== Founding as disco parties (1970s) ===
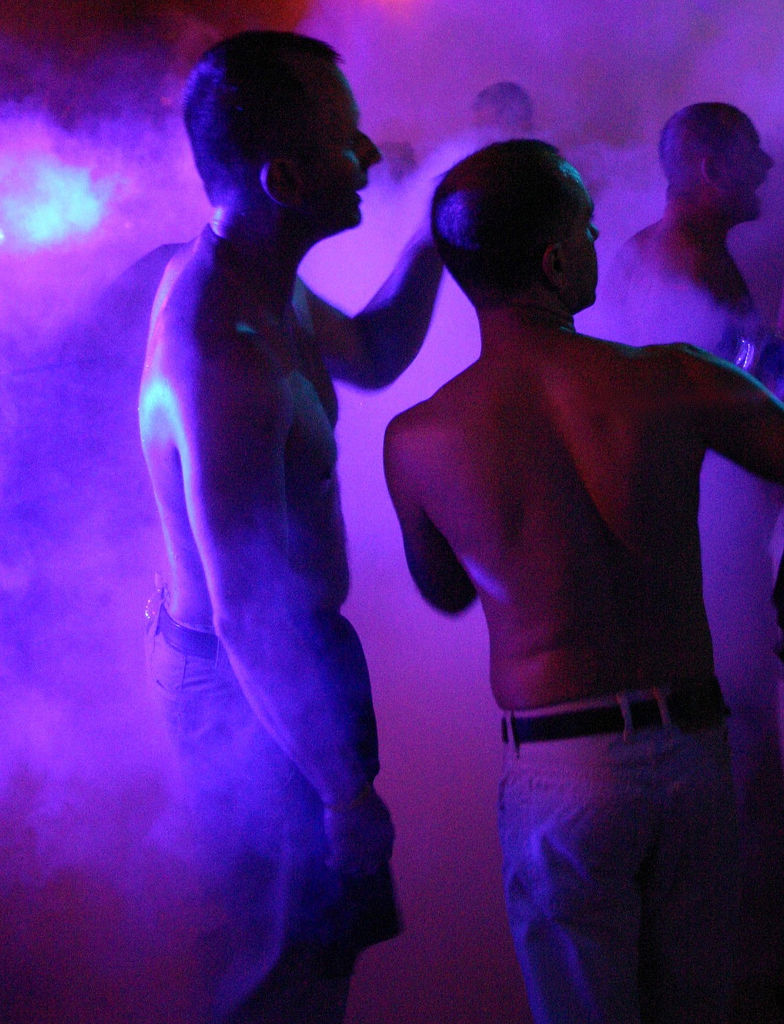
A circuit party in Atlanta, Georgia

The start of the circuit has been attributed to many different parties that sprang up during the late 1970s and early 1980s. The earliest forms of circuit parties in the late 1970s, the precursors of what later became circuit parties, were called disco parties. They lasted one evening only, and were held in various large venues in metropolitan areas with large gay populations. Although Flamingo and 12 West were Manhattan clubs that had theme-centered gay parties, these nightclubs were eclipsed by the opening of The Saint in the East Village in 1980.

The Saint, which was constructed inside the renovated space that had once housed the renowned Fillmore East theatre, featured a dome-covered dance floor, the dome being suspended in mid-air, and a complete planetarium mechanism that projected a starscape onto the dome above the dance floor. While open every weekend beginning in September, The Saint's once monthly parties became marathon events that drew gay men from around the world. These parties created the concept of a single disco party being the focal point for a weekend getaway in the gay community.

What was to become another circuit party was founded during the same time period by Corbett Reynolds, a Columbus, Ohio-based artist and nightclub owner in the late 1970s. Initially, Reynolds envisioned a one-night party-to-end-all-parties, designed around the theme of the color Red (hence the name "Red Party"), which was to be held at Reynolds' nightclub, “Rudely Elegant.”

The Red Party proved to be so successful, and drew so many outside visitors, that it filled the Valley Dale Dance Hall to capacity and became an annual event, outliving the closure of the bar in the early 1980s. Reynolds was a true artist, creating complete party-scapes all in red. On the 25th anniversary of the Red Party, the theme of which was to have been "Rome", Mr. Reynolds died. Those in charge of his estate thought about how, if at all, to continue the event and, in the end, decided to retire the concept of the "Red Party" and leave it to history.

=== AIDS crisis and growth of parties (1980s–1990s) ===
The early 1980s saw the start of the AIDS crisis, and entire communities were affected. Several benefit parties sprang up around the country, which were run by volunteer organizations that donated their proceeds to HIV/AIDS-related charities, such as Halloween's in New Orleans. The success of these early parties gave way to other events hosted in other cities, with each party having its own theme. Many were named after colors, such as White Party, Black Party, Blue Ball, and Black and Blue Festival. And many center around other events, such as Southern Decadence and the Folsom Street Fair. Dance parties provided an environment in which gay men processed the experience of HIV/AIDS and served to build particular forms of communal response to the epidemic

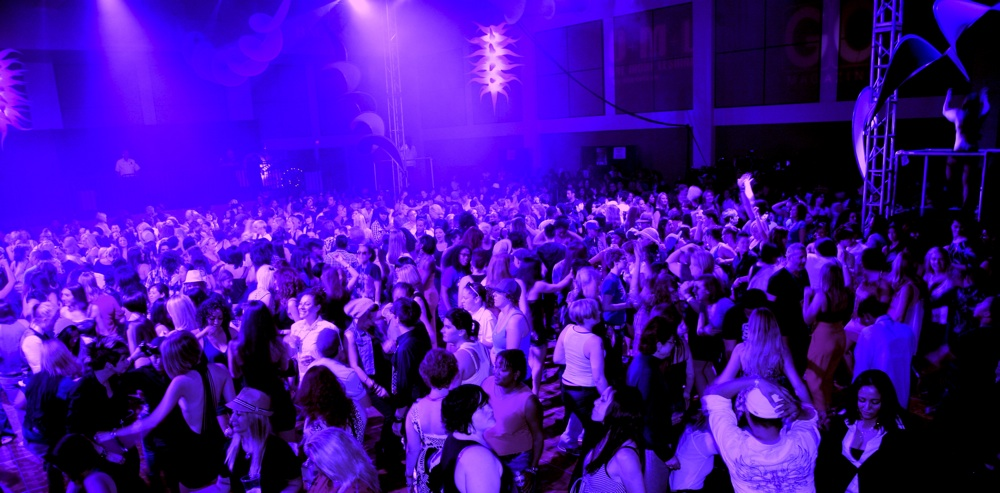
The White Diamonds Party at Club Skirts Dinah Shore Weekend

One economic reality of a circuit party is that the event can bring large amounts of tourist money to the locality where the event is held. Because of their economic impact, Circuit parties have been welcomed in liberal cities where they are held.

In the early 1990s, as more and more gay men became attracted to these mega dance-events, the real modern-day circuit party scene emerged and expanded into ever-larger productions, featuring superstar DJ's and performers. Promoters sometimes turned events from one party into a major series of parties at various venues, transforming a weekend into a three-day or longer continuous party. For example, a pool party might go from noon to 5PM, a "t-dance" from 5PM to 9PM, a main event from 9PM to 4AM, and an after-hours party from 4AM until 12 noon, after which the cycle repeats itself.

To keep putting together these increasingly elaborate and costly productions, the prices (cover charge) of circuit parties increased greatly, so that it was not uncommon for a ticket covering the full weekend of parties to cost $400 or more.

=== Peak and decline in popularity (2000s) ===
Having reached its peak around 1999–2000 (as evidenced by the total number of events during those years, and the steady decline in the number of events since), the Circuit found itself a smaller part of a much larger whole. In 2004, The New York Times travel section featured an in-depth look at The White Party in Palm Springs in conjunction with staff members of Noizemag. The central focus was to determine why thousands of men spend multi-thousands of dollars to travel to this yearly event. Taken from the viewpoint of an experienced (female) raver, this gave the mainstream a view into what makes Circuit Parties so compelling for many and highlighted many of the changes taking place in these commercial events.

Nonetheless, the downward trend continued through the entire decade, with the downfall of a dozen events such as The Red Party, FireBall, Hotlanta, The Morning Party, Hell Ball, Reunion, and Motorball.

In the early 2000s, promoters became worried as attendance decreased dramatically at many circuit events. This decline in attendance was attributed to several factors. The original circuit audience that began attending the circuit parties of the '80s and '90s had grown older and no longer had such an active interest in multi-day partying. The communal experience of HIV/AIDS changed in the context of the availability of more effective treatments. In addition, all-gay cruises, which attract upwards of 1,500 passengers, have had a dramatic impact on the attendance at circuit parties.

While some parties have disappeared from the landscape, the scene continues to thrive in many places with attendance rebounding from the dip that occurred after the new Millennium. This has proven true at the recently produced events, like Black and Blue in Montreal, and events that have more than just a circuit party to offer, such as Southern Decadence weekend in New Orleans. In addition, all-gay cruises that carry upwards of 2,000 passengers on week-long excursions to popular travel destinations continue to be very popular.

=== Recent resurgence (2010-present) ===
Circuit parties are currently organized in many international cities, each of them having another leading company, such as Matinee in Barcelona and WE Party Madrid.

Circuit parties seem to have gained widespread popularity again. This resulted in the annually organized Circuit Festival by the Matinée Group since 2008. Circuit Festival is currently the biggest international gay and lesbian event, hosting more than 50 DJs every year during twelve days of circuit parties, bringing together all leading international circuit brands in Barcelona. Since 2012 it has attracted an increasing number of gay visitors of over 70,000 per edition.

Circuit parties in the United States experienced a notable resurgence in the 2010s and consistently attract large crowds of gay men. In 2017, VICE News described them as parties "where gay men seek sex and freedom."

== Culture and controversy ==
Observers within the gay and medical communities have published concerns about the culture of circuit parties, particularly the high use of drugs and mood changers including: alcohol, marijuana, methamphetamine, ecstasy, pink cocaine, cocaine, ketamine, GHB, amyl nitrite, psilocybin mushrooms, and other "party drugs". It is common for circuit party promoters to hire medical professionals to be stationed outside venues in anticipation of drug overdoses, dehydration, severe psychosis, or alcohol poisoning during an event. Observers also point to the risks of overdose and impaired judgment leading to more condomless sex and sexually transmitted diseases (STDs) (see Sexual Ecology). Circuit parties have been blamed for the spread of substance abuse and the rise in transmission of STDs, particularly HIV, among gay men.

== Overview and media perception ==
While open to anyone, the parties are generally viewed as social events primarily for physically fit and masculine-identified White gay men. Circuit parties charge admission, with some being run for-profit and others benefiting charities, generally those that benefit the LGBTQ+ communities or HIV/health related programs. Circuit parties can be expensive and lavish affairs with elaborate lighting, music, productions, decor, and are held in venues that can accommodate large crowds.

Circuit parties are known to attract a broad range of ages, from young gay men in their early 20s to those in their 40s, 50s and even 60s, and both single gay men and couples in long-term relationships. The parties are described by attendees as very important social events, analogous to a major holiday for some in the gay community. They can be described as a "celebration" of gay life and gay sexuality, an expression of freedom, and as a statement of the power and strength of the gay community.

Circuit parties are often perceived by outsiders as highly superficial; moreover those who attend them are often the target of broad and negative judgments by others in the gay community, usually because of the high amount of promiscuous sex and drug use that is often perceived to be associated with the events. A small body of empirical research from different research groups does, indeed, point to a high prevalence of drug use among people who attend circuit events during the course of the events and raises questions about an association between drug use and risky sex practices among gay and bisexual men Circuit parties frequently host celebrity performers or headliners, usually gay icons.

Men who frequent circuit parties and embody stereotypes affiliated with the typical attendee are often referred to as "circuit queens." The term can be used in a derogatory or humorous manner depending on the context.

== Related media ==
- Circuit, a 2001 film in which circuit parties are a major aspect of the plotline
- When Boys Fly, a 2002 documentary set at the Miami, Florida White Party
- Sexual Ecology, a book by Gabriel Rotello
- Official photo archive website

== Notable circuit parties ==
- Bal en Blanc
- The Week International
- Black and Blue Festival
- Real Bad (San Francisco, CA)
- Club Skirts Dinah Shore Weekend
- Market Days (Chicago, IL)
- The Purple Party (Dallas, TX)
- Rat Parties
- Southern Decadence (New Orleans, LA)
- XOXO (San Francisco, CA)
- White Party Bangkok (Bangkok, Thailand)

== See also ==
- List of electronic music festivals
- Gay bar
- Bear (gay culture)
- Drug addiction
- Party and play
- Rave party
- Sexual addiction
