= TLA Releasing =

US film distributor

- Company type: Film distribution
- Headquarters: Philadelphia, Pennsylvania, United States
- Products: Motion pictures, DVDs
- Website: https://www.tlareleasing.com/

TLA Releasing is an American film distribution and production company owned by TLA Entertainment Group. In March 2011, a new LLC was formed for the operation. Its primary output is LGBT-related films from all over the world under the "TLA Releasing" label, as well as horror films under the label "Danger After Dark". Since 2000, they have released over 200 films on DVD and various VOD platforms.

== History ==
In 2005, they opened a branch in the UK. In June 2011, they announced "TLA Select", a line of Blu-rays of TLA Releasing's the most popular films, including Latter Days, Another Gay Movie and Another Gay Sequel, Make the Yuletide Gay, and Boy Culture.

In July 2011, the UK division lost its entire inventory of DVDs when rioters in London burnt down a Sony warehouse. Sony rapidly worked to replenish the lost stock.

== Select films released through TLA Releasing ==
- 29th and Gay (2005)
- 800 Balas (2002)
- Absolut Warhola (2001)
- Adam & Steve (2005)
- A Little Lust (Italy, "Né Romeo, Né Giulietta")
- Another Gay Movie (2006)
- Another Gay Sequel: Gays Gone Wild! (2008)
- Bear City (2010)
- Bear City 2: The Proposal (2012)
- Beautiful Boxer (2003)
- Blackmail Boys
- Bloomington (2010) (UK)
- Blue and Not So Pink (2012) (Venezuela)
- Boy Culture (2006)
- Boys in the Sand (1971)
- Cachorro (2004)
- Children of God (2010)
- Circuit (2002)
- Conspiracy of Silence (2003)
- David's Birthday (2009) (UK)
- Death of a Dynasty (2003)
- Down in Paris (2021) (USA & UK)
- Dog Tags (2008)
- Dorian Blues (2004)
- Edge of Seventeen (1998)
- Eighteen (2005)
- Ethan Mao (2004)
- Far Side of the Moon (2003)
- Finding Me (2009)
- Finding Me: Truth (2011)
- Five Dances (2013)
- The Fluffer (2001)
- From Beginning to End (2009)
- Fruit Fly (2009)
- Godforsaken (2003)
- Gone But Not Forgotten (2003)
- La Primera Noche (2003)
- Latter Days (2003)
- Leo's Room (UK)
- Locked Up
- Love, Spells and All That (2019)
- Luster (2002)
- Make the Yuletide Gay (2009)
- Metrosexuality (2001)
- Mom + Mom (2018)
- Mysterious Skin (2004)
- Naked Boys Singing (2007)
- Naked Fame (2005)
- O Homem Que Copiava (2003)
- Old Men in New Cars (2002)
- One Kiss (2016) (Italy, "Un Bacio")
- P.S. Your Cat Is Dead (2002)
- Pervert! (2005)
- Say Uncle (2005)
- Shiner (2004)
- Sleeper Cell (2005) (Series 1, Region 2 only)
- Soundless Wind Chime (2009)
- Speechless (2012)
- Straight-Jacket (2004)
- The Stranger in Us (UK) (2010)
- Stratosphere Girl (2004)
- Street Bangaz
- Surrender Dorothy (1998)
- Three Dancing Slaves (Le Clan) (2004)
- Under One Roof (2002)
- Waiting for the Messiah (2000)
- The Wedding Video (2003)
- When Boys Fly (2002)
- The Wooden Camera (2003)
- Wrangler: Anatomy of an Icon (2008)
- You Are Not Alone (1978)
- Zerophilia (2005)

== Danger After Dark films ==
- 2LDK (2003)
- Dante's Inferno (USA, 2007)
- Epitaph (South Korea, 2007)
- Evilenko (Italy, 2005)
- Feed (Australia, 2005)
- Gutterballs (Canada, 2008)
- Hell's Ground (Zibahkhana) (Pakistan, 2007)
- The Living and the Dead (UK, 2006)
- Meatball Machine (Japan, 2005)
- Moon Child (Gackt) (Japan, 2003)
- Next Door (Naboer) (Norway, 2005)
- Satan Hates You (USA, 2010)
- Storm (Sweden, 2005)
- Strange Circus (Japan, 2005)
- Suicide Club (Japan, 2002)
- Summer Scars (USA, 2007)
- Danger After Dark Collection (Japan, 2002)
- Evil (To Kako) (Greece, 2005)
- Pistoleros (Denmark, 2006)
- Rapturious (USA, 2007)
- The Wedding Party (Belgium, 2005)
