= Everett Lewis =

American independent filmmaker

- Occupation: Filmmaker

Everett Lewis is an American independent filmmaker whose directorial credits include: The Natural History of Parking Lots (Sundance 1990), An Ambush of Ghosts (Sundance 1992), Skin & Bone (Toronto 1994), Luster (Outfest 2000), FAQs (Philadelphia 2002), Lucky Bastard (Outfest 2008), The Pretty Boys (2011), Somefarwhere (2012), premiered at the Paris Gay and Lesbian Film Festival Cheries Cherie), and Territory (2016).

Lewis earned a Bachelor of Arts degree from North Carolina State University and a Master of Fine Arts from the University of Southern California. He has served on the faculty or as a guest lecturer of a number of colleges and universities, including the University of Southern California School of Cinematic Arts, Chapman College and Long Beach City College.

== Filmography ==
Year	Title	Notes
1990	The Natural History of Parking Lots	director; writer; editor
1992	An Ambush of Ghosts	director
1994	Skin & Bone	director; writer; editor
	Eye of My Heart	director; writer; editor
2000	Luster	director; writer; editor
2005	FAQs	director; writer; editor; also known as Prends-Moi in France
2008	Lucky Bastard	director; writer; editor
2010	The Pretty Boys	director; writer; editor
2011	Somefarwhere	director; writer; editor
2012	Territory	director; writer; editor
