= White Party Miami =

Annual LGBT event in Miami, Florida

- Genre: LGBT
- Begins: 1985
- Frequency: Annual
- Locations: Miami, Florida
- Inaugurated: 1985
- Most recent: 2019

White Party Miami was an annual, LGBTQ-based event held in Miami, Florida between 1985 and 2019 to raise money for HIV/AIDS-related charities. Initially the White Party was a single formal evening event. By 1994 it had grown into White Party Week, six days of both officially-sponsored and independently-organized events on the party circuit. Miami's White Party has been described as the "crown jewel" of fundraising and as a "more elevated charity affair". It was highly successful as a fundraising event and inspired other AIDS fundraisers in the USA and abroad.

Core events of the week traditionally included the official formal White Party, held for many years at Villa Vizcaya (now Vizcaya Museum and Gardens). Attendees wore all white, giving the event its name. Another popular official event was the Muscle Beach Party. Cultural locations for events have also included the Perez Art Museum and the Miami Beach Botanical Garden.

White Party Miami has been estimated to attract 10,000 to 15,000 people globally from the United States, South America, Canada and Europe. Attendees have included celebrities such as Ru Paul, Madonna, Cyndi Lauper, Calvin Klein Jennifer Lopez, and Gloria Estefan, and social activists such as Lauren Foster.

== Purpose ==
The first White Party was organized by Miamians Frank Wager and Jorge Suarez as a fundraiser to raise awareness of HIV/AIDS, a new disease that was beginning to affect large numbers of people in South Florida. They worked with a local AIDS nonprofit, the Health Crisis Network (HCN). Artist Martin Kreloff designed the party invitation poster, which featured a little cherub blowing a horn and the words "Journey to Romance".

Dressed in white, 1,600 guests attended the inaugural White Party of 1985, held at Vizcaya Museum and Gardens. Vizcaya hosted more than thirty years of formal White Party events, with some notable exceptions. In 1992 Hurricane Andrew damaged the estate's elaborate house and grounds, necessitating a move to the Biltmore Hotel in Coral Gables.

The flagship formal event attracted tourists to South Florida during its off-season and increased attendance at local gay clubs and bars. White Party Week would grow to include six days of parties, performances and special events, generally held in November around the American Thanksgiving weekend. Alain Berrebi became chairman of the first official White Party Week in 1994.

However, in 1997, the Health Crisis Network experienced financial difficulties after poor attendance at its other major fundraising event, the AIDS Walk. The organization worked with the Community Research Initiative (CRI), a Miami nonprofit supporting AIDS clinical trials of protease-inhibitor drugs, and formed Care Resource, Inc. in 1998. The executive director of Community Research Initiative, Rick Siclari, became the executive director of Care Resource, Inc. Care Resource, Inc. became a community health centre, providing services to the LGBT community and others in the greater South Florida area. In 2017, Care Resource served 17,460 people through a variety of treatment, education, and outreach programs.

From 1998-2018, Care Resource, Inc. hosted White Party events, primarily three official fundraisers: White Knights (an opening event), the Muscle Beach Party, and the formal White Party. Other events were organized independently and could be listed as part of the week in return for donating part of their proceeds to Care Resource. The organizers emphasized the fundraising and educational goals of the White Party. While others have criticized White Party Week, seeing party culture as encouraging risky behaviors such as unsafe sex and drug use, the White Party's organizers asserted that the official "White Party isn't that kind of party."

The White Party initially appealed primarily to affluent gay white men. In 1998, an estimated 56% of attendees were travelers to Miami. After the 1998 reorganization, some women's events were added such as the Cirque Blanc dance party, predominantly attended by lesbian women. It has sometimes been held at Nikki Beach.

The White Party has received financial support from a wide range of organizations including the Government of Miami-Dade County, the City of Miami Beach, Gilead Sciences, and Absolut Vodka.

== Music ==
Dance music was a major focus of White Party Week, which included world-famous DJs and performers such as Chus & Ceballos. In 2013, the White Party formal featured Offer Nissim and Joe Gauthreaux as DJs, along with a performance by Esthonian singer Kerli.

DJs such as DJ Kimberly S, DJ Adien, Manny Lehman, and Tony Moran developed strong followings on the party circuit. White Party Miami produced signature albums to commemorate some of its events. In 2007, DJ Wendy Hunt and DJ Warren Gluck produced a signature album which was made available on Centaur Records.

Fundraising has also included the sale of calendars such as "Boys on the beach", produced in 2015 by photographer Max-Arthur Mantle with part of the proceeds going to Care Resources.
