= Call Me Mother season 1 =

First season of Call Me Mother

Call Me Mother
- Season 1
- Promotional poster for season one
- Hosted by: Dallas Dixon
- Coaches: Peppermint; Crystal; Barbada de Barbades
- No. of contestants: 10
- Winner: Toddy
- Winning coach: Peppermint
- Runners-up: Kiki Coe; Valerie Hunt
- No. of episodes: 8

Release
- Original network: OutTV
- Original release: October 25 – December 13, 2021

Season chronology
- Next → Season 2

The first season of Call Me Mother premiered on October 25, 2021. The cast was announced on October 5, 2021

The prize package for the winner includes an all-inclusive seven-night stay for two at the Secrets Vallarta Bay Hotel in Puerto Vallarta, Mexico, courtesy of Air Canada Vacations, a year's supply of BPerfect Cosmetics, a year's supply of Wella Professionals hair product and the chance to be the Wella Face of Pride for 2022, a consultation with leading LGBTQ management company Producer Entertainment Group and a single which will be produced and released by their recording label, PEG Records, a meeting with top TV and film agents at Clear Talent Group, the opportunity to be featured in an upcoming Daddy Couture Clothing campaign, and a cash prize of $25,000.

On June 3, 2021, it was announced that Peppermint, Crystal and Barbada de Barbades would be leading the series as the mothers to the competing drag houses. Dallas Dixon was also announced as the host. It was later revealed that Farra N. Hyte and Miss Butterfly would be joining the series as aunties. The series was the highest-rated original production in OutTV's history. On December 15, two days after the first-season finale, OutTV announced the renewal of the series for a second season.

The winner of the first season of Call Me Mother was Toddy, with Kiki Coe and Valerie Hunt as runners-up.

Kiki Coe was later announced as part of the fourth season cast of Canada's Drag Race in 2023. She ended up placing sixth after winning one maxi challenge. She was the first drag queen ever to be a full competitor in both franchises, although Makayla Couture from Season 2 of Call Me Mother made a guest appearance on the second season of Canada's Drag Race as the makeover partner of Icesis Couture in the "Prom" episode. Sanjina DaBish Queen was cast on fifth season placing ninth overall.

Calypso Cosmic also competed as a designer in the second season of Sew Fierce.

== Contestants ==
Names, and cities stated are at time of filming.

Contestants of Call Me Mother season 1 and their backgrounds
Contestant	Age	Hometown	House	Outcome
Toddy	26	Vancouver, British Columbia	Dulcet	Winner
Kiki Coe	33	Ottawa, Ontario	Dulcet	Runners-up
Valerie Hunt	24	Calgary, Alberta	Glass	Runners-up
Sanjina DaBish Queen	28	Toronto, Ontario	Harmonie	4th place
HercuSleaze	33	Montreal, Quebec	Glass	5th place
Narcissa Wolfe	23	Trois-Rivières, Quebec	Harmonie	6th place
Felicia Bonée	29	Edmonton, Alberta	Dulcet	7th place (Note: Felicia Bonée quit the competition.)
Calypso Cosmic	21	Toronto, Ontario	Harmonie	8th place
Rosie	21	Richmond Hill, Ontario	Glass	9th place
Ella Lamoureux	36	Kelowna, British Columbia	—N/a	10th place

== Contestant progress ==
Legend:

Toddy won Call Me Mother season 1.
Kiki Coe and Valerie Hunt were the runners-up.
WIN indicates that the House or contestant scored the highest in the challenge.
SAFE indicates that the house or contestant was declared safe by the judges.
BTM (Bottom) indicates that the house was up for elimination.
ELIM (Eliminated) indicates that the contestant was eliminated.
QUIT indicates that Felicia Bonée quit the competition.
Dulcet indicates that the contestant was chosen to be in the House of Dulcet by Peppermint.
Glass indicates that the contestant was chosen to be in the House of Glass by Crystal.
Harmonie indicates that the contestant was chosen to be in the House of Harmonie by Barbada.

Progress of contestants including rank/position in each episode
Contestant	Episode							
Contestant	1	2	3	4	5	6	7	8
Toddy	Dulcet	WIN	WIN	BTM	WIN	SAFE	SAFE	Winner
Kiki Coe	Dulcet	WIN	WIN	BTM	WIN	WIN	SAFE	Runner-up
Valerie Hunt	Glass	BTM	SAFE	WIN	SAFE	SAFE	WIN	Runner-up
Sanjina Dabish Queen	Harmonie	SAFE	BTM	SAFE	BTM	SAFE	ELIM	
HercuSleaze	Glass	BTM	SAFE	WIN	SAFE	ELIM		
Narcissa Wolfe	Harmonie	SAFE	BTM	SAFE	ELIM			
Felicia Bonée	Dulcet	WIN	WIN	QUIT				
Calypso Cosmic	Harmonie	SAFE	ELIM					
Rosie	Glass	ELIM						
Ella Lamoureux	ELIM							

== Special guests ==
Guests appearing over the course of the season, giving guidance to the competing artists in video chat sessions or serving as guest judges, included Adam All, Trixie Mattel, Vinegar Strokes and Matthew Camp.

== Episodes ==
No. overall	No. in season	Title	Original release date
1	1	"Episode 1: Adoptions"	October 25, 2021
The drag artists participate in three rounds of adoption challenges to be selected by one of the three drag mothers: a look challenge, a talent challenge and a conversation with the mothers; however, with three spots on each team and three drag mothers, one of the ten artists will not be selected.: Adopted in Round 1: Kiki Coe, Rosie; Adopted in Round 2: Valerie Hunt, Felicia Bonée, HercuSleaze, Sanjina Dabish Queen, Toddy; Adopted in Round 3: Narcissa Wolfe, Calypso Cosmic; Eliminated: Ella Lamoureux
2	2	"Episode 2: Let Them Eat Cake"	November 1, 2021
Mini Challenge: Create a cake that looks like your House Mother; Mini Challenge Winner: Valerie Hunt; Runway Category: My Drag Journey: A look giving insight into the start of their drag; Highest Score: House of Dulcet; Prize: Headstart to prepare for the Showcase; Showcase: Let Them Eat Cake: Design a Marie Antoinette inspired look; Bottom House: House of Glass; Eliminated: Rosie
3	3	"Episode 3: Tantrums & Tiaras"	November 8, 2021
Mini Challenge: Put together a quick drag look incorporating sports equipment, platform shoes and breastplates; Mini Challenge Winner: Sanjina Dabish Queen; Runway Category: Dynasty; Highest Score: House of Dulcet; Prize: Headstart to prepare for the Showcase; Showcase: Design a pageant look for one house member to wear it on the runway.; Bottom House: House of Harmonie; Eliminated: Calypso Cosmic
4	4	"Episode 4: Modern Horrors"	November 15, 2021
Mini Challenge: Do their makeup with their non-dominant hand; Mini Challenge Winner: HercuSleaze; Runway Category: Classic Horror; Highest Score: House of Glass; Showcase: Acting Challenge: Act and lipsync an original sketch with dialogue from the horror films The Little Shop of Horrors, House on Haunted Hill and Night of the Living Dead; Bottom House: House of Dulcet; Quit: Felicia Bonée
5	5	"Episode 5: The Roast of Your Mother"	November 22, 2021
Guest Judge: Adam All; Mini Challenge: Tease a wig as high as they can.; Mini Challenge Winner: Sanjina Dabish Queen; Runway Category: Burn Baby, Burn; Highest Score: House of Glass; Prize: Decide the performance order of the roast; Showcase: Roast the house mothers; Bottom House: House of Harmonie; Eliminated: Narcissa Wolfe
6	6	"Episode 6: Out of the Darkness"	November 29, 2021
Mini-Challenge Special Guest: Trixie Mattel; Mini Challenge: Turn themselves into the childhood doll of their dreams; Mini Challenge Winner: Toddy; Mini Challenge Prize: $500 gift card from Trixie Cosmetics; Runway Category: Musicals; Showcase: Perform excerpts from the musical Everybody's Talking About Jamie; Showcase Special Guest: Vinegar Strokes; Eliminated: HercuSleaze
7	7	"Episode 7: Turbulence & Business Class"	December 6, 2021
Mini-Challenge Special Guest: Matthew Camp; Mini Challenge: Design a logo and a special product for the artists' personal brand merchandising.; Mini Challenge Winner: Valerie Hunt; Runway Category: Travel; Showcase: Create and perform a short comedy routine as a flight attendant giving a pre-flight safety demonstration for Call Me Mother Airlines, with each drag artist having to style themselves to represent a different decade.; Eliminated: Sanjina Dabish Queen
8	8	"Episode 8: The Mother of All Finales"	December 13, 2021
