= Kiki Coe =

Filipino-Canadian drag queen, costume designer, and chef

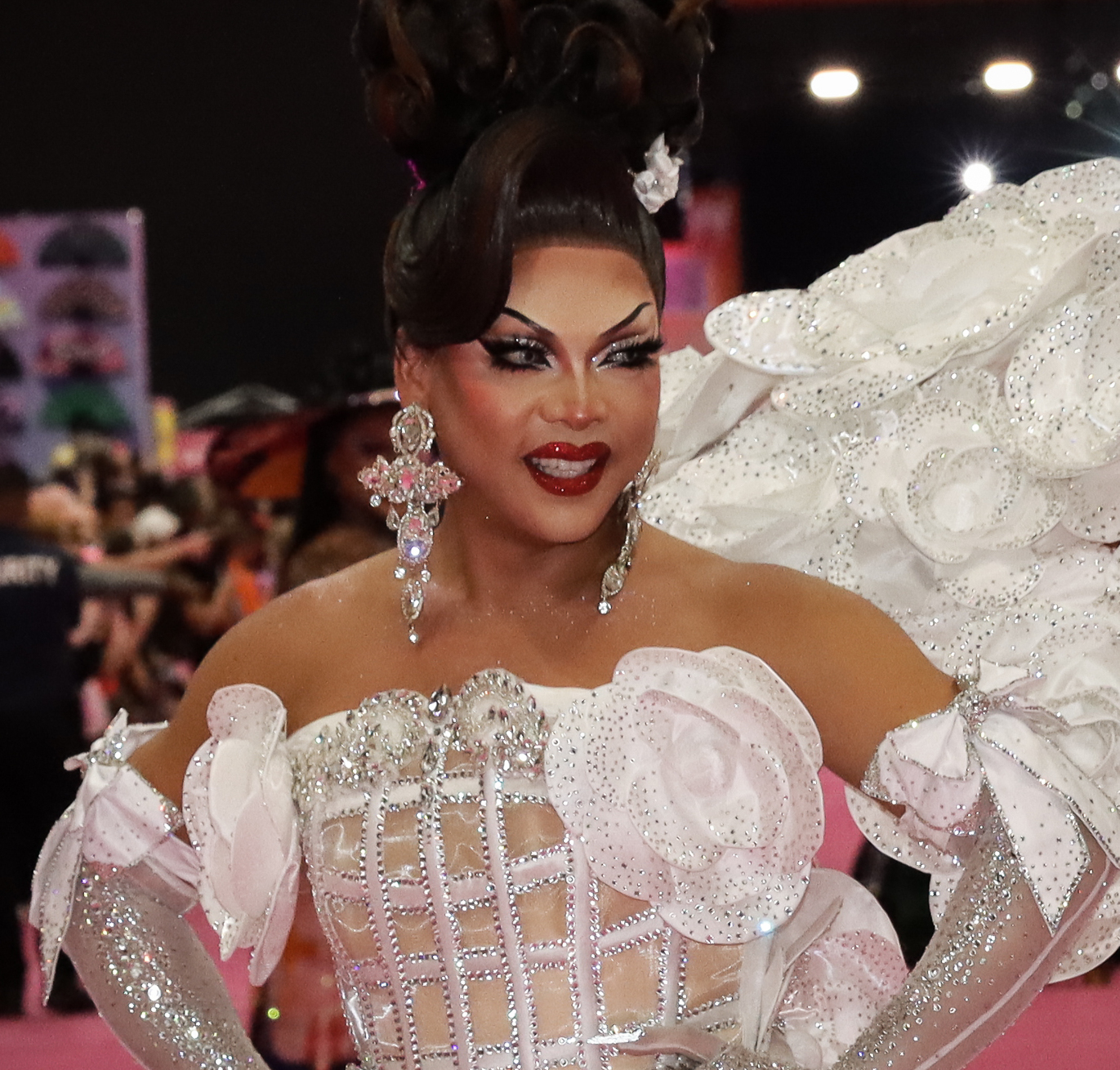
- Kiki Coe at RuPaul's DragCon LA 2024
- Born: Sandro Pangilinan; Philippines
- Television: Chopped Canada; Call Me Mother; Canada's Drag Race (season 4)

Sandro Pangilinan, known by the stage name Kiki Coe, is a Filipino-Canadian drag queen, costume designer, and chef who rose to prominence as a finalist on the first season of Call Me Mother. She is one of the contestants on the fourth season of Canada's Drag Race.

== Career ==
=== Drag career ===
Kiki Coe has been working in the Ottawa drag scene since the early 2010s. She is a previous winner of the Ms. Capital Pride Pageant as well as Ottawa's Queer of Halloween. She has also served on the judging panel for the Pageant. She first rose to prominence by appearing in the first season of OutTV's Call Me Mother in 2021. She was the first contestant chosen to join a house when Peppermint selected her for the House of Dulcet. She went on to win four challenges during the season and finished as a runner-up behind winner Toddy.

She is also a costume designer and had multiple pieces appear on Canada's Drag Race, notably Icesis Couture's finale runway and Kimmy Couture's Goddess look on season 3.

In October 2023, she was announced as one of the eleven contestants competing in the fourth season of Canada's Drag Race. She was eliminated after placing in the bottom two of the Rusical challenge and losing a lip-sync against Denim.

=== Culinary career ===
Coe is also a trained chef and has worked in the culinary field in Ottawa and Gatineau. In 2016 she appeared in the premiere episode of the third season of Chopped Canada.

== Personal life ==
Coe was born in The Philippines and immigrated to Canada. She is close friends with Icesis Couture and Kimmy Couture, and has created costumes for both of them for their appearances on Drag Race.

== Filmography ==
Year	Title	Role	Notes
2016	Chopped Canada	Himself	Contestant, episode "Sauce on the Side"
2021	Call Me Mother	Herself	Finalist (season 1)
2023	Canada's Drag Race	Herself	Contestant (season 4)
2023	Sew Fierce	Herself	Guest

- Bring Back My Girls (2024)
