= Call Me Mother =

Canadian reality television series

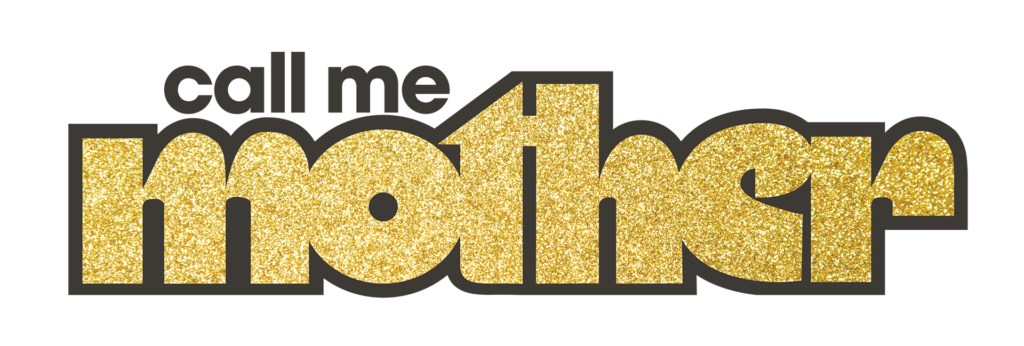
- Call Me Mother Logo
- Genre: Reality competition
- Directed by: Jan McCharles; Rae Upton
- Starring: Peppermint; Crystal; Barbada de Barbades
- Country of origin: Canada
- Original language: English
- No. of seasons: 2
- No. of episodes: 8

Production
- Executive producers: Daniel Oron; Natasha Ryan; Glenn Sims
- Production location: North Bay
- Production companies: Go Button Media; RedFlame TV

Original release
- Network: OutTV
- Release: October 25, 2021 – present

Call Me Mother is a Canadian reality television series, which premiered on OutTV in 2021. Hosted by Entertainment Tonight Canada reporter Dallas Dixon, the series is a drag competition which will see up-and-coming drag performers join one of three drag houses to compete in group challenges, with one drag artist eliminated each week until the winner of the competition is crowned the "First Child of Drag".

The series is distinct from the RuPaul's Drag Race franchise in adding a drag mother mentoring and coaching team aspect similar to The Voice or The X Factor, and is also a fully inclusive competition featuring drag queens, drag kings, transgender and non-binary drag artists.

The houses are led by established drag queens Peppermint (House of Dulcet), Crystal (House of Glass) and Barbada de Barbades (House of Harmonie). Ontario drag queen Farra N. Hyte, the drag mother of RuPaul's Drag Race competitor and Canada's Drag Race judge Brooke Lynn Hytes, and Québec drag queen Miss Butterfly serve as "aunties", who provide additional support and feedback but do not directly "mother" their own teams. Hyte and Dixon were also the co-hosts of a weekly companion podcast which included post-elimination interviews with the competing artists.

Miss Butterfly did not return as an "auntie" for the second season, and was replaced by past Dragula winner Landon Cider.

Call Me Mother was created by RedFlame TV, and produced in Canada by Go Button Media and RedFlame TV. It was shot in North Bay, Ontario in early 2021.

The series premiered with its first season on October 25, 2021. The first season was won by Toddy, a non-binary drag performer from Vancouver, British Columbia. A second season, announced on December 15 and released in 2022, was won by drag performer Weebee.

== Production ==
=== Season 1 ===
Casting occurred in the early months of 2021, with production starting in late spring 2021. The final cast was announced on October 5, 2021. The inaugural season consisted of eight episodes.

=== Season 2 ===
On December 15, two days after the first season finale, OutTV announced the renewal of the series for a second season following the success of the first. Casting for the second season opened on February 16, 2022. The official cast was announced on September 22, 2022 with a premiere date of October 26.

== Mothers and other figures ==
On June 3, 2021, it was announced that Peppermint, Crystal and Barbada would be leading the series as the mothers to the competing drag houses. Dallas Dixon was also announced as the host. It was later revealed that Farra N. Hyte and Miss Butterfly would be joining the series as aunties. When the official cast for season 2 was announced, it was confirmed that Peppermint, Crystal and Barbada would be returning as the mothers for the second season and that Dallas Dixon would be returning as the host. On September 30, 2022, it was revealed that Farra N. Hyte would be returning as an auntie and a judge, and would be joined by Dragula season 3 winner Landon Cider taking the role of "guncle" and judge.

Call Me Mother Mothers and other figures
| Figure | Season | |
| Figure | 1 | 2 |
|---|---|---|
| Dallas Dixon | Host | |
| Peppermint | Mother | |
| Crystal | Mother | |
| Barbada | Mother | |
| Farra N. Hyte | Auntie | |
| Miss Butterfly | Auntie | |
| Landon Cider | | Guncle |
| Wig Zaddy | Salon Team | |
| Lucinda Miu | Salon Team | |
| Connor McCalden | Salon Team | |

== Series overview ==
| Series | Premiere Date | Finale Date | Winner | Runners-up | No. of contestants | Winner's prizes |
|---|---|---|---|---|---|---|
| 1 | October 25, 2021 | December 13, 2021 | Toddy | Kiki Coe; Valerie Hunt | 10 | $25,000; An all-inclusive 7 nights stay for two at the Secrets Vallarta Bay Hotel in Puerto Vallarta, Mexico, courtesy of Air Canada Vacations; A year's supply of BPerfect Cosmetics; A year's supply of Wella Professionals hair product and the chance to be the Wella Face of Pride for 2022; A consultation with leading LGBTQ management company PEG; A single which will be produced and released by the PEG recording label PEG Records; A meeting with top tv and film agents at Clear Talent Group; The opportunity to be featured in an upcoming Daddy Couture Clothing campaign; The title of Canada's First Child of Drag |
| 2 | October 26, 2022 | December 21, 2022 | Weebee | Jessie Précieuse; Makayla Couture; Pepper | 15 | $25,000 (courtesy of Freddie); An all-inclusive 7 nights stay for two at the Almar Resort luxury LGBTQ+ beachfront experience in Puerto Vallarta, Mexico, courtesy of Air Canada Vacations; A year's supply of Rimmel Cosmetics; A year's supply of Wella Professionals hair product and the chance to be the Face of Wella at Pride Toronto; The title of Canada's First Child of Drag |

== Relationship to other shows ==
Although the shows are not directly related, four performers to date have appeared in both Call Me Mother and Canada's Drag Race:

- Season 1: Kiki Coe competed in the fourth season of Canada's Drag Race, and Sanjina DaBish Queen competed in the fifth season.
- Season 2: Makayla Couture appeared on the second season of Canada's Drag Race as the makeover partner of Icesis Couture in the "Prom" episode prior to competing in the second season of Call Me Mother, and later became a full competitor in season 5 of CDR, and the first season of All Stars. Mya Foxx appeared on the sixth season of CDR.

Barbada and Crystal have both also served as hosts of OutTV's Sew Fierce, a drag competition show centred around design.

== Reception ==
The series was the highest-rated original production in OutTV's history for Season 1.
