= Peppermint (entertainer) =

American actress, singer, and drag queen

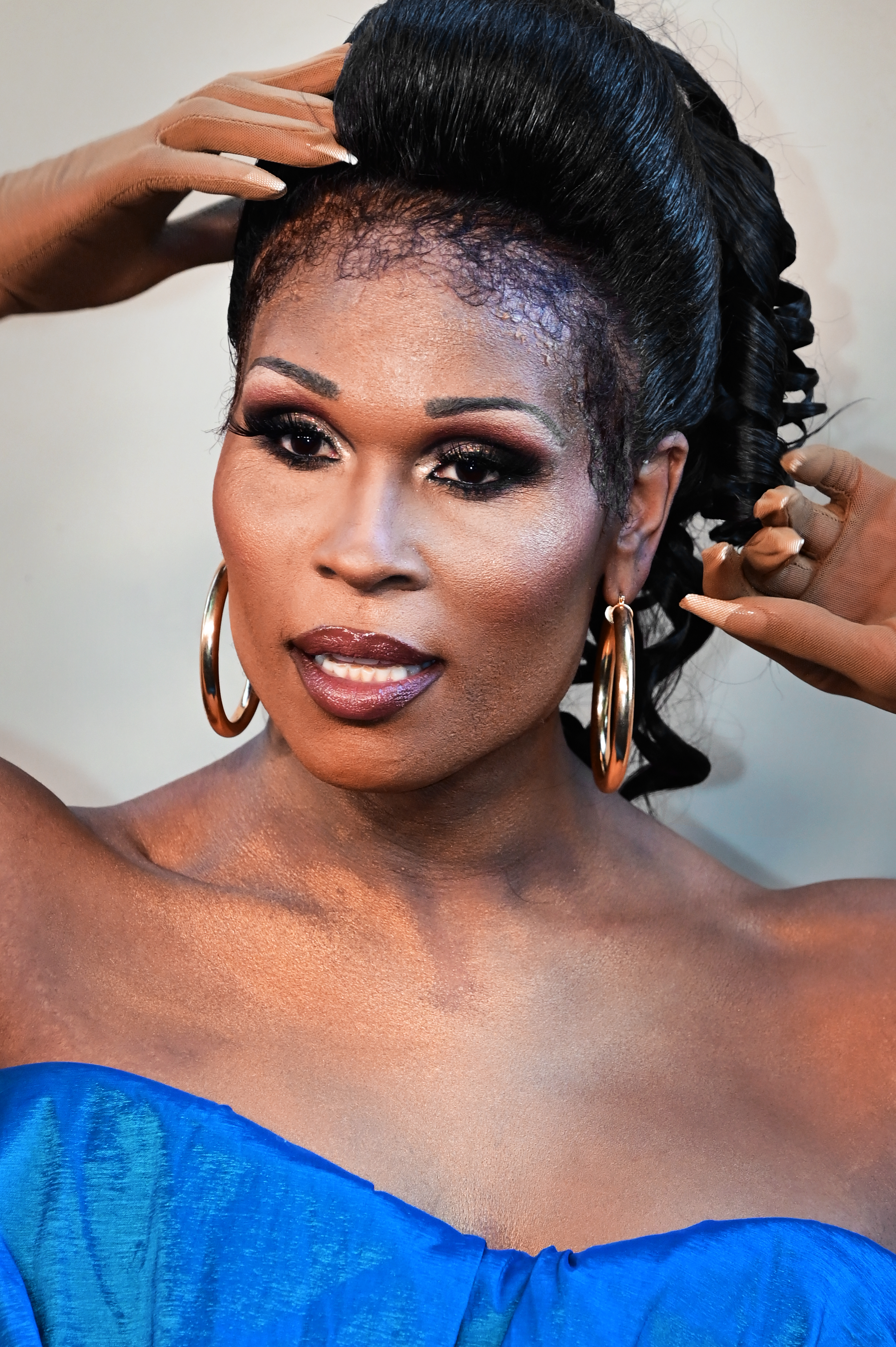
- Peppermint in 2026

Background information
- Also known as: Miss Peppermint; Peppermint Gummybear
- Born: January 31, 1980 (age 46); Hershey, Pennsylvania, US
- Genres: Pop; R&B; dance; Hip hop; house; homo hop
- Occupations: Actress, drag queen, singer, songwriter, LGBTQ activist
- Instrument: Vocals
- Years active: 2001–present
- Labels: Hardcore Glamour; JRED Music; SNOCONE; Producer Entertainment Group
- Website: Official website

Peppermint, or Miss Peppermint (born January 31, 1980), is an American actor, singer, songwriter, television personality, drag queen, and LGBTQ activist based in New York City. She competed on the ninth season of RuPaul's Drag Race in 2017, finishing as the runner-up. Peppermint made her debut in The Go-Go's-inspired musical Head Over Heels in 2018, becoming Broadway's first out trans woman to originate a lead role.

As a recording artist, she has released the studio albums Hardcore Glamour (2009) and Black Pepper (2017), as well as five EPs, including A Girl Like Me: Letters to My Lovers (2020). Peppermint was cast for the second season of The Traitors, which aired in 2024.

== Early life ==
Peppermint was raised in Hershey, Pennsylvania, and Wilmington, Delaware. She felt her gender non-conformity was policed, so she tried to fit in with others' expectations. She transitioned after moving to New York City and came out in 2012, before she appeared on RuPaul's Drag Race. While a contestant on Drag Race, Peppermint revealed that when she had been a high-school cheerleader, she had been beaten up by a male member of her high school's basketball team.

== Career ==
=== Early work ===
Peppermint started performing as a child in youth theatre, playing roles at Opera Delaware, Delaware Children's Theatre, and The Brandywiners Community Theatre. She continued performing at Wilmington High School where she was also on the cheerleading team. For a time, she also worked as a makeup artist for MAC Cosmetics.

Peppermint moved to New York City in Harlem to study musical theatre at AMDA. While in college she got a job at the Tunnel nightclub Kurfew parties, ultimately becoming a fixture in New York City nightlife. She contributed the song "Servin' It Up", produced by Adam Joseph, for the 2005 Jonny McGovern release This is NYC, Bitch! The East Village Mixtape, later released as Peppermint's debut single in 2006.

Peppermint was featured in the web series Queens of Drag: NYC by gay.com in 2010. The series featured fellow New York drag queens Bianca Del Rio, Dallas DuBois, Hedda Lettuce, Lady Bunny, Mimi Imfurst, and Sherry Vine. She also appeared as a drag-version of Tyra Banks on America's Next Top Model Cycle 14, Episode 5: "Smile and Pose" introducing a drag-theme runway challenge at Lucky Chengs in New York City.

=== RuPaul's Drag Race ===
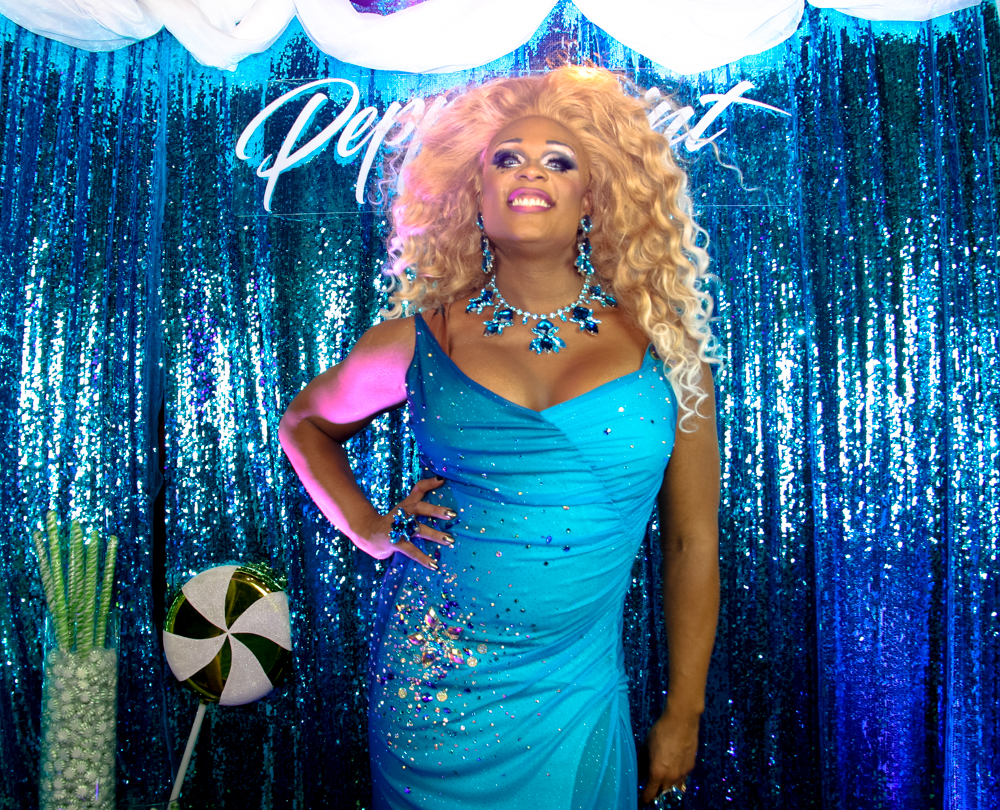
Peppermint at RuPaul's DragCon NYC, in 2017

Peppermint talked about being trans publicly for the first time on an episode of The Daily Show called "The Trans Panic Epidemic" in April 2016.

On February 2, 2017, Peppermint was announced as one of the fourteen contestants on the ninth season of RuPaul's Drag Race. Though other transgender women have competed on RuPaul's Drag Race, she was the first to have come out prior to the show airing, having come out in 2012.

She won the Roast Challenge in episode 8. She placed in the bottom two in two challenges, lip-synching to Madonna's "Music" and the Village People's "Macho Man", winning both. Her performances earned her the favorable nickname "Lip Sync Assassin". Ultimately, she finished in second place to winner Sasha Velour, after they both lip-synced to Whitney Houston's "It's Not Right but It's Okay (Thunderpuss Remix)".

=== Music ===
Peppermint's debut studio album Hardcore Glamour was self-released in 2009 and preceded by the singles "Servin' It Up" and "Thought Ya Knew". In 2011, Sherry Vine and Peppermint released a parody of the Lady Gaga and Beyoncé song "Telephone" titled "Make Me Moan". Following the viral success of the music video, Peppermint later released other parody songs, including a parody of Azealia Banks' song "212", titled "21/12". Her song "If I Steal Your Boyfriend" was used in the 2011 film Eating Out 5: The Open Weekend.

On April 3, 2017, Peppermint released a six-track EP of remixes of various songs she had released up to that point, including the single "Dolla in My Titty". Her second studio album Black Pepper was released in June of the same year. A three-song EP with producer Cazwell called Blend was released in 2018. In 2019, Peppermint appeared on fellow Drag Race alum Trinity the Tuck's single "I Call Shade", which charted at number 13 on the Billboard Comedy Digital Tracks chart.

On February 11, 2020, it was announced that Peppermint was working on a new album, and the lead single "What You're Looking For" was released on February 14, 2020. In an interview with Entertainment Tonight on August 28, 2020, Peppermint stated that the album would in fact be a trilogy of EPs, and that a full studio album was previously planned for a May 2020 release but was delayed due to the ongoing COVID-19 pandemic. The first of these EPs, A Girl Like Me: Letters to My Lovers, will be released on October 16, 2020, with the lead single "Best Sex" being released on October 2. Of the project, she said "it really does focus on my life -- who I am as a trans woman -- and everything that's happening right now [with] Black Lives Matter, Black Trans Lives Matter and a lot of the issues that we are dealing with socially." She also confirmed that the project would feature collaborations with Laith Ashley, Jerome Bell, Daniel Shevlin of Well-Strung, Matt Katz-Bohen of Blondie, Corey Tut and Adam Joseph.

The EP garnered Peppermint a nomination for Outstanding Music Artist at the 2021 GLAAD Media Awards.

On November 17, 2023, Peppermint released the debut single "STILETTO" with her newly announced pop music supergroup TransSisterRadio consisting of fellow members CASio (Clint Ashley Spires) original member of NYC underground music groups DaLipstyxx (Paper Magazine's Sounds of the City), THE KIKI TWINS and Synthia (Stephan Alexander) stage performer and recording artist.

TransSisterRadio released their highly anticipated follow-up single “TASTY” on March 22, 2024. They subsequently made their debut performance and first public appearance on April 4, 2024, at the party LolliPOP at the club RedEye NY. As of April 20, 2024 “STILETTO” and its remixes by DJ Erik Elias & NOAH along with “TASTY” have amassed more than 200,000+ streams on Spotify.

=== Acting ===
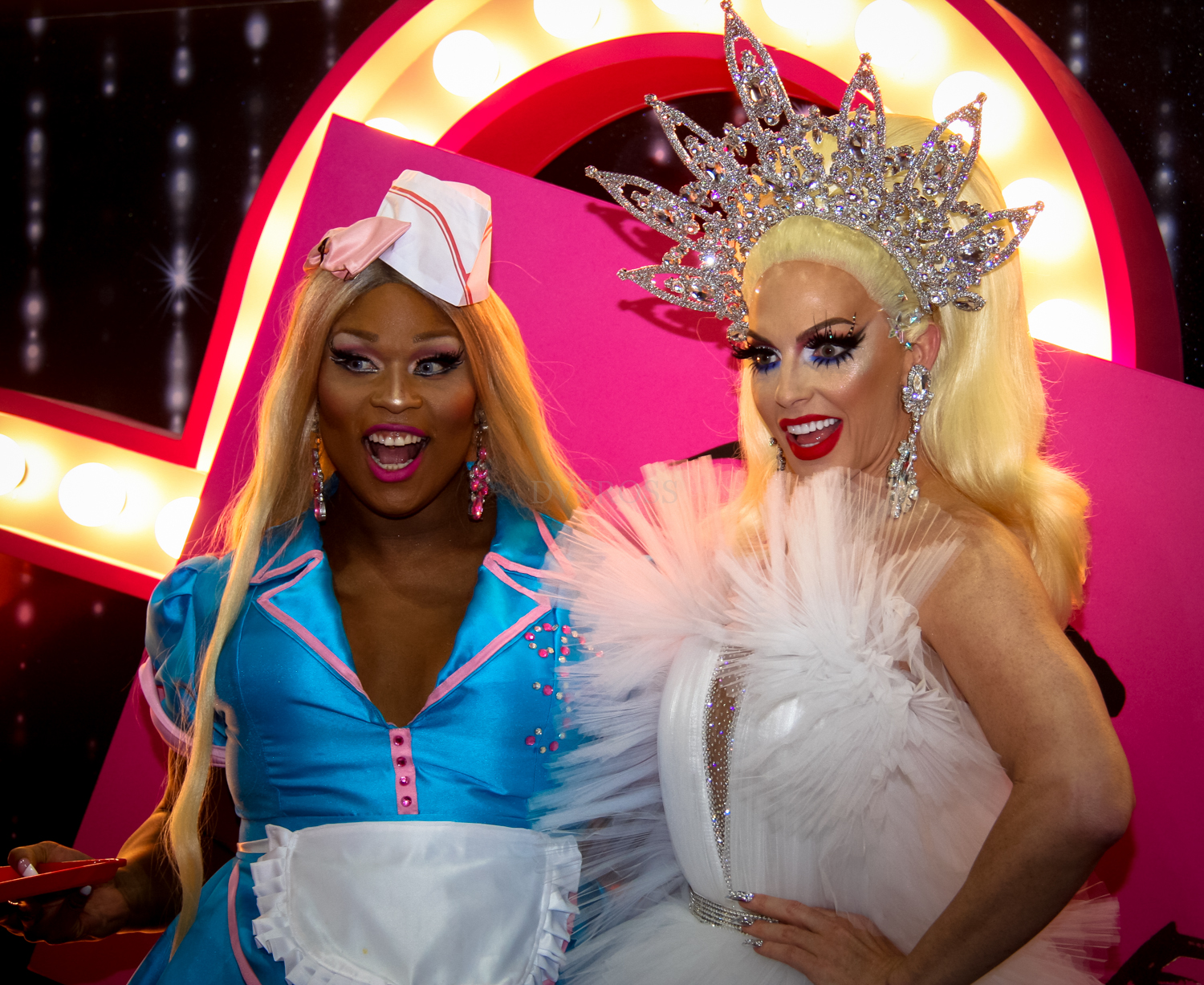
Peppermint (left) with Alyssa Edwards at RuPaul's DragCon LA in May 2019

Peppermint made her Broadway debut in The Go-Go's-inspired musical Head Over Heels using the songs of The Go-Go's. The plot of the show is somewhat based on The Countess of Pembroke's Arcadia written by Sir Philip Sidney in the 16th century. The show began previews in June 2018 and officially opened July 2018, at the Hudson Theatre; playing the role of Pythio, Peppermint became the first trans woman to originate a principal role on Broadway.

Writing for Deadline Hollywood, Greg Evans summed up his impression of the musical as "occasionally amusing, occasionally cloying", expressing disappointment that many popular Go-Go's songs appeared to have been flattened over the years the musical spent in development. In Entertainment Weekly, Kelly Connolly viewed the show more favorably, praising "the charismatic cast" and Michael Mayer's "joyful production"; she gave the A− score overall. The New York Times's critic Ben Brantley's review drew criticism as transphobic and misgendering of Peppermint's character. The Times subsequently edited the review and Brantley apologized for it, writing that he had tried to "reflect the light tone of the show". The show closed in January 2019.

Peppermint has had appearances on Pose and Saturday Night Live, and in October 2019 played the role of Pastor Olivia, "the [transgender] leader of an LGBTQ-friendly congregation", in a two-episode arc of God Friended Me.

=== Continued career ===
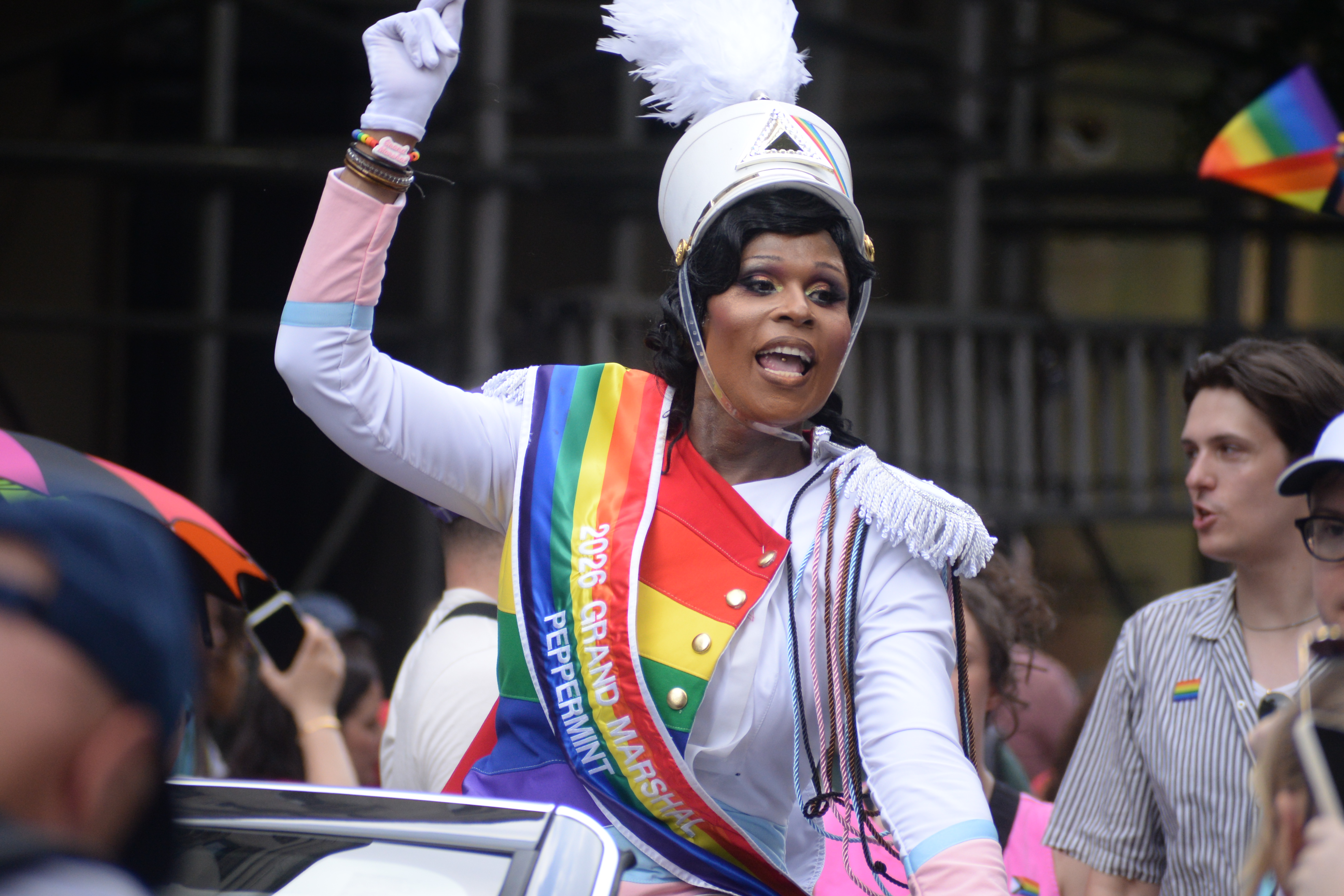
Peppermint as Grand Marshal of the NYC Pride March in 2026

From 2019 to 2020, she co-hosted It's a Mess podcast with Cazwell.

Peppermint is a co-founder of Black Queer Town Hall along with Bob The Drag Queen. The inaugural event featured speakers such as Laverne Cox and Angela Davis and raised over $270,000 for The Okra Project.

On June 2, 2021, Peppermint was announced as a cast member of OUTtv's Call Me Mother, where her and fellow "Drag Mothers" Crystal and Barbada de Barbades adopt and mentor up-and-coming drag talent over an eight-week journey as they compete to win the title of "First Child Of Drag" and a $50,000 prize package. In the show, Peppermint will be representing the House of Dulcet.

In September 2023, it was announced that Peppermint would be a contestant on Peacock's second season of The Traitors. The season was released in January 2024.

In 2025, Peppermint contributed the essay "I'm Still Learning" to the anthology Both/And: Essays by Trans and Gender-Nonconforming Writers of Color, edited by Denne Michele Norris with Electric Literature. The collection became a finalist for the 2026 Lambda Literary Award for Transgender Nonfiction.

== Public image ==
She does not use her birth name, and asks that publications not deadname her. For several years, she went by the name "Angel", which derived from her portraying Angel in a one-act production of Rent.

== Discography ==
Peppermint discography
- Studio albums: 2
- EPs: 5
- Singles: 14
- Comedy albums: 1

=== Studio albums ===
Title	Details
Hardcore Glamour	Released: September 16, 2009; Label: Hardcore Glamour; Formats: CD, digital download
Black Pepper	Released: June 21, 2017; Label: Hardcore Glamour; Formats: digital download

==== Comedy albums ====
Title	Details
Si-SIGH-Ety Effects	Released: April 21, 2023; Label: Comedy Dynamics; Formats: digital download, streaming

=== Extended plays ===
Title	Details
Sugar & Spiked	Released: April 3, 2017; Label: JRED Music; Formats: CD, digital download
Blend (with Cazwell)	Released: March 10, 2018; Label: SNOWCONE; Formats: digital download
A Girl Like Me: Letters to My Lovers	Released: October 16, 2020; Label: Producer Entertainment Group; Format: vinyl, CD, digital download
Letters (The Remixes)	Released: April 16, 2021; Label: Producer Entertainment Group; Format: digital download, streaming
Moment of Weakness: Letters to My Lovers	Released: April 22, 2022; Label: Producer Entertainment Group; Format: digital download, streaming

=== Singles ===
==== As lead artist ====
Title	Year	Album
"Servin' It Up" (featuring Cazwell)	2006	Hardcore Glamour
"Thought Ya Knew"	2007	Hardcore Glamour
"Dolla in My Titty (Part 1)"	2013	Non-album singles
"C.L.A.T." (with Aja, Alexis Michelle and Sasha Velour featuring DJ Mitch Ferrino)	2017	Non-album singles
"Civil War"	2017	Black Pepper
"Too Funky" (with Ari Gold)	2017	Black Pepper
"#Liftmeup" (with Amanda Lepore, Debbie Harry, Greko, and Sharon Needles)	2019	Non-album singles
"What You're Looking For"	2020	Non-album singles
"Lift Them Up 2020" (with Amanda Lepore, Debbie Harry, Greko, and Sharon Needles)	2020	Non-album singles
"Best Sex"	2020	A Girl Like Me: Letters to My Lovers
"A Girl Like Me" (Electropoint remix)	2021	Letters (The Remixes)
"(Put Your) Gay Hands Up" (with Jan and Alaska)	2021	Non-album singles
"Here for It"	2021	Non-album singles
"Broken Home" (featuring Jerome Bell)	2022	Moment of Weakness: Letters to My Lovers

==== As featured artist ====
Title	Year	Peak chart positions	Album
Title	Year	US Comedy Dig.	Album
"Category Is" (RuPaul featuring Peppermint, Sasha Velour, Shea Coulee, and Trinity the Tuck)	2017	—	Non-album singles
"Thirsty" (Adam Joseph featuring Peppermint)	2017	—	Non-album singles
"I Call Shade" (Trinity the Tuck featuring Peppermint)	2019	13	Plastic

=== Other appearances ===
Title	Year	Other artist(s)	Album
"We Three Queens"	2017	Manila Luzon and Alaska Thunderfuck	Christmas Queens 3
"What Child Is This"	2017	Thorgy Thor	Christmas Queens 3
"R U Mad"	2018	Michael Blume and Shea Coulee	Cynicism & Sincerity
"Pretty Girl Anthem"	2018	Jiggly Caliente	T.H.O.T. Process
"Vision of Nowness"	2018	Original Broadway Cast of Head Over Heels	Head Over Heels (Original Broadway Cast Recording)
"Heaven Is a Place on Earth"	2018	Jeremy Kushnier, Rachel York, and Original Broadway Cast of Head Over Heels	Head Over Heels (Original Broadway Cast Recording)
"Whoever You Might Be"	2020	Jackson Teeley	Within Earshot: Anthems for the In-Between

=== Music videos ===
Title	Year	Director(s)
"Servin' It Up" (featuring Cazwell)	2006	Unknown
"Thought Ya' Knew"	2008	Unknown
"Working Girl"	2009	Unknown
"Excuse My Beauty"	2010	Brendan Kyle Cochrane
"Let You Have It"	2010	Karl Giant
"Fresh" (featuring Adam Joseph and Cazwell)	2011	Unknown
"Dolla in My Titty"	2014	Unknown
"Too Funky" (featuring Ari Gold and the cast of RuPaul's Drag Race Season 9)	2017	Marsin
"Civil War"	2017	Mikhail Torich
"Blend" (featuring Cazwell)	2018	Brenden T. R. Gregory
"Black Pepper"	2018	Assaad Yacoub
"Vision of Nowness"	2019	Tyler Stone
"The Most Office"	2020	Jake Wilson

=== Parody music videos ===
Title	Year	Director(s)
"Make Me Moan" (Sherry Vine and Peppermint)	2010	Blake Martin
"JLo Papi" (Sherry Vine and Peppermint)	2012	Francis Von Legge
"3D End of Time"	2012	Unknown
"21/12"	2012	Francis Von Legge
"Epic Broadway Medley Parody" (Sherry Vine and Peppermint)	2017	Unknown

== Filmography ==
=== Film ===
Year	Title	Role	Notes	Ref(s)
2005	Beyond the Ladies Room Door	Herself	Short film	
2006	Fur			
2011	Finding Home	Herself		
2019	Trixie Mattel: Moving Parts	Herself		
2019	Ru's Angels	Herself	Short film	
2020	Nubia: Amplified	Themself	OutTV original	
2021	Being Bebe	Themself	Archive footage	
2021	The Bitch Who Stole Christmas	Bea Eeep		
2022	Fire Island	Peppermint		

=== Television ===
Year	Title	Role	Notes
2007	CSI: NY	Sex Worker	Season 3, Episode 14: "The Lying Game"
2009	The Real World: Brooklyn	Herself	Episode 2: "The Outs and Ins of Brooklyn"
2010	America's Next Top Model	Tyra Banks	Cycle 14, Episode 5: "Smile and Pose"
2010	Ugly Betty		Season 4, Episode 13: "Chica and the Man"
2010	The A-List: New York	Herself	Season 1, Episode 6: "Texting and Tears"
2012	She's Living for This	Herself	Season 1, Episode 2: "The Peppermint Episode"
2016	The Daily Show	Herself	Season 21, Episode 86. "April 6—Angelica Ross"
2017	RuPaul's Drag Race	Contestant	Season 9, Runner up
2018	RuPaul's Drag Race	Herself (guest)	Season 10, Episode: 10s Across the Board
2017	Breakfast Television Toronto	Herself	Guest
2018	Saturday Night Live	Drag Queen	Guest Appearance; Episode: "Steve Carell/Ella Mai"
2019	Full Frontal with Samantha Bee	Drag Queen	Guest Appearance
2019	Pose	Euphoria	Guest Appearance
2019	God Friended Me	Pastor Olivia	Guest Appearance (2 Episodes)
2019	Hey Qween	Herself (guest)	Guest appearance
2020	Deputy	Daisy	Episode 1: "Graduation Day"
2020	Watch What Happens Live with Andy Cohen	Herself	Season 17, Episode 43
2020–present	I Am Jazz	Herself	Recurring
2020–present	Translation	Herself	Co-host
2021	The Sherry Vine Variety Show	Herself	Guest
2021	Call Me Mother	Herself	Drag Mother
2021	Schmigadoon!	Madam Vina	Guest, Episode: "Schmigadoon!"
2023–2026	Survival of the Thickest	Peppermint	Recurring role
2024	The Traitors	Contestant	Season 2, 21st place

=== Audio series ===
Year	Title	Role	Ref.
2021	Macbeth	Three Witches	
2021	Hot White Heist	Camilla Toe	

=== Web series ===
Year	Title	Role	Notes	Ref.
2010	Queens of Drag: NYC	Herself	Produced by gay.com	
2017	Untucked	Herself	Companion show to RuPaul's Drag Race	
2018	Drag Babies	Herself	Drag Mentor	
2019	Bestie$ For Ca$h	Herself	Guest, with Cazwell	
2019	Out of the Closet	Herself	Guest	
2019	Jag Race	Herself	by Attitude	
2019	Black Girl Beauty	Herself	By VH1	
2020	The Only Review	Herself	By The Only Productions	
2020-23	The Pit Stop	Herself	Guest, 3 episodes	
2020	The Rocky Horror Picture Show	Dr. Frank. N. Furter (singing double for Tim Curry)	Fundraiser for the Democratic Party of Wisconsin.	
2021	Wanna Be On Top?	Herself	Podcast, guest	
2021	DRAMA	Herself	Podcast, guest	
2022	In Transit	Herself	Guest	
2023	Marque and Hector turn Trash into Treasure	Daffy	Guest	
2024	The Traitors Postmortem	Herself	Guest	

=== Music video appearances ===
Year	Song	Director	Ref.
2008	"When We Get Together" (The Ones)	Karl Giant	
2013	"Christmas on the Dance Floor" (Greg Scarnici)	Greg Scarnici	
2017	"C.L.A.T"	Assaasd Yacoub	
2017	"Faces" (Mila Jam)	Frank Boccia	
2017	"Expensive (Deluxe Version)" (Todrick Hall)	Todrick Hall and Matthew Macar	
2017	"Let It Snow" (Christmas Queens)	Brad Hammer	
2019	"Scores" (Kahanna Montrese)	Brad Hammer	
2019	"I Call Shade" (Trinity the Tuck)	Tyler Stone	
2020	"Mask, Gloves, Soap, Scrubs" (Todrick Hall)	Todrick Hall	
2020	"Always" (Waze & Odyssey)	Unknown	

=== Theatre credits ===
Year	Title	Role	Notes
2018	Head Over Heels	Pythio	San Francisco, California, Curran Theatre
2018–2019	Head Over Heels	Pythio	Broadway, Hudson Theatre

== See also ==
- Drag culture in New York City
- LGBTQ culture in New York City
- List of LGBTQ people from New York City
- NYC Drag March
- NYC Pride March
- Transgender culture in New York City
