= Toddy (entertainer) =

Canadian comedian, drag performer and opera singer

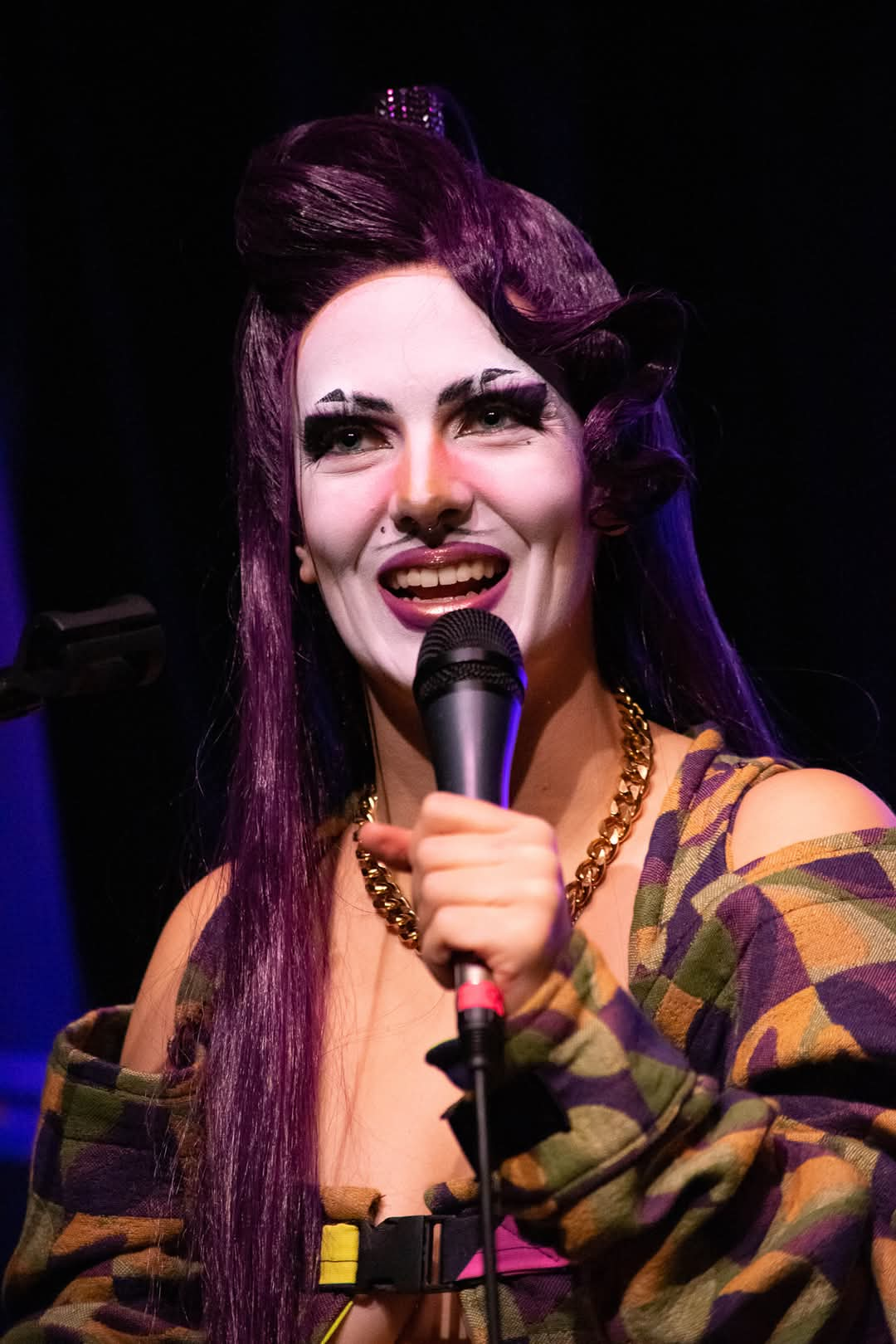
- Toddy in 2021
- Television: Call Me Mother (first season)

Toddy is a Canadian comedian, drag performer, and opera singer who won the first season of Call Me Mother. Toddy started in Toronto's drag king scene, and is now based in Vancouver, British Columbia. Named after their childhood teddy bear, Toddy is non-binary.

== Filmography ==
=== Television ===
- Call Me Mother (first season)

== See also ==
- List of people from Toronto
- List of people from Vancouver
