= Drag (entertainment) =

Gender-defying art

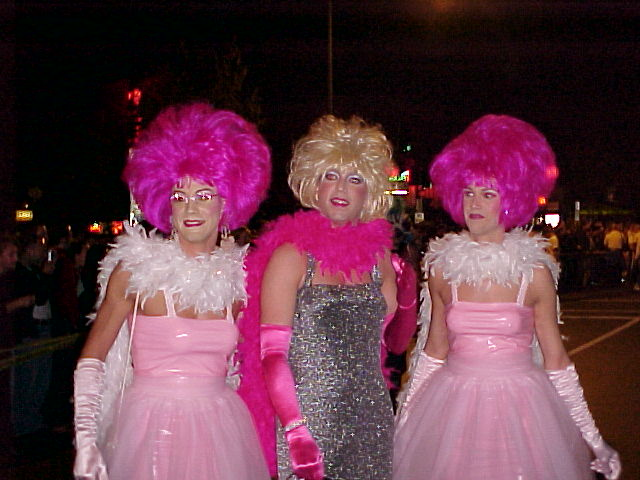
Participants of the High Heel Drag Race in Washington, D.C., 2005

Drag is a performance of exaggerated femininity, masculinity, or other forms of gender expression, usually for entertainment purposes. Drag usually involves cross-dressing. A drag queen is someone (usually male) who performs femininely and a drag king is someone (usually female) who performs masculinely. Performances often involve comedy, music, social satire, and at times political commentary. The term may be used as a noun as in the expression in drag or as an adjective as in drag show.

== Etymology ==
The origin of the term drag is uncertain. The first recorded use of drag in reference to actors dressed in women's clothing is from 1870. One suggested etymological root is 19th-century theater slang, from the sensation of long skirts trailing on the floor. Another possible origin is the Yiddish term trogn meaning "to wear", from the German tragen. It may also have been based on the term grand rag, which was historically used for a masquerade ball.

== In folk custom ==
Men dressed as women have been featured in certain traditional customs for centuries. For example, the characters of some regional variants of the traditional mummers' play, which were traditionally always performed by men, include Besom Bet(ty); numerous variations on Bessy or Betsy; Bucksome Nell; Mrs Clagdarse; Dame Dolly; Dame Dorothy; Mrs Finney; Mrs Frail; and many others.

The variant performed around Plough Monday in Eastern England is known as the Plough Play (also Wooing Play or Bridal Play) and usually involves two female characters, the young "Lady Bright and Gay" and "Old Dame Jane" and a dispute about a bastard child. A character called Bessy also accompanied the Plough Jags (also known as Plough Jacks, Plough Stots, Plough Bullocks, etc.) even in places where no play was performed: "she" was a man dressed in women's clothes, who carried a collecting box for money and other largesse.

"Maid Marian" of the Abbots Bromley Horn Dance is played by a man, and the Maid Marians referred to in old documents as having taken part in May Games and other festivals with Morris dancers would most probably also have been men. The "consort" of the Castleton Garland King was traditionally a man (until 1956, when a woman took over the role) and was originally simply referred to as "The Woman".

== Theatre ==
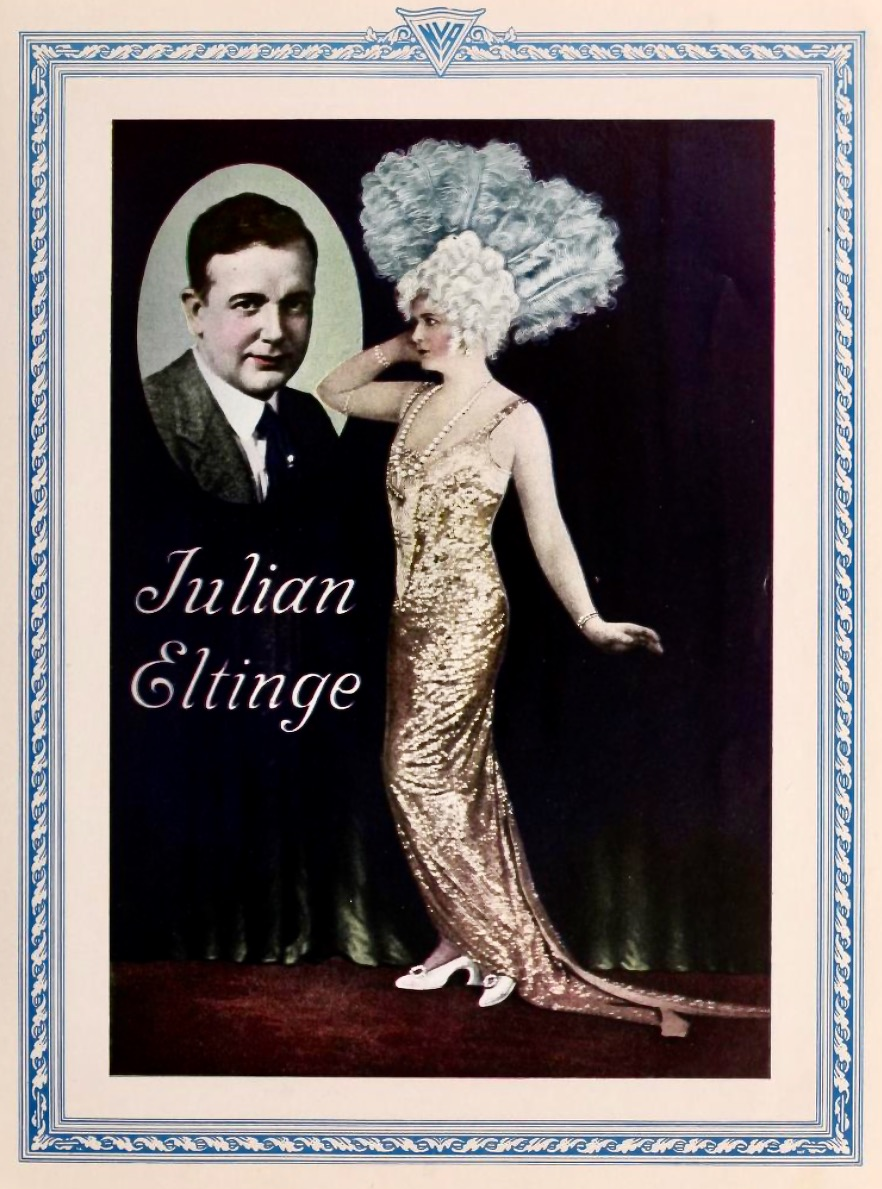
Broadway star Julian Eltinge, 1925

Cross-dressing elements of performance traditions are a widespread and longstanding cultural phenomena.

The ancient Roman playwright Plautus' (c. 254–184 BCE) Menaechmi includes a scene in which Menaechmus I puts on his wife's dress, then wears a cloak over it, intending to remove the dress from the house and deliver it to his mistress. Menaechmus says: "Look at me. Do I look the part?" [Age me aspice. ecquid adsimulo similiter?] Peniculus responds: "What in the world have you got on?" [Quis istest ornatus tuos?] Menaechmus says: "Tell me I am gorgeous." [Dic hominem lepidissimum esse me.]

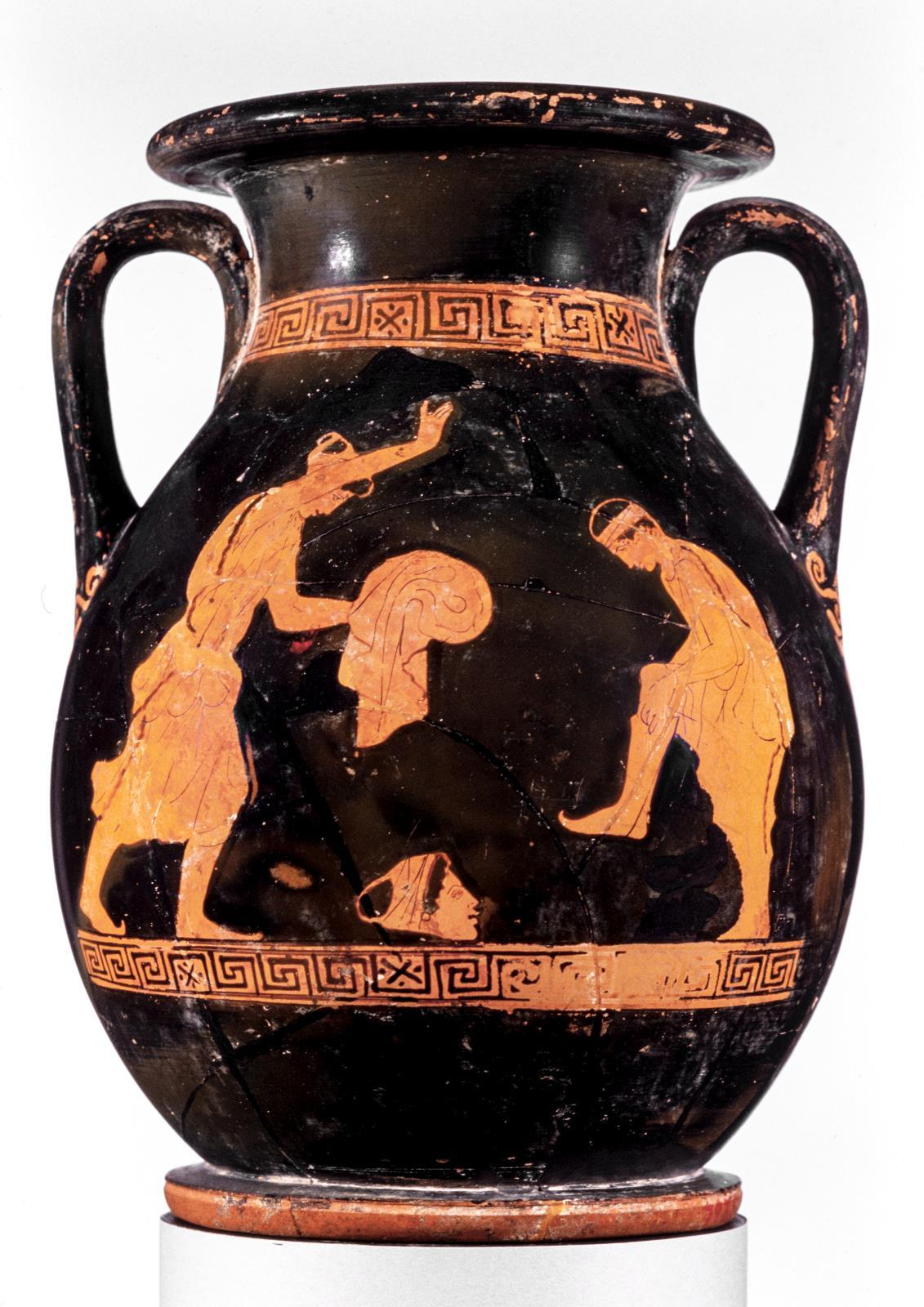
Male performers putting on female costumes prior to a theatre performance. The figure on the left is wearing a mask and a second mask is lying on the ground between them. The masks represent a female character and they have a kerchief around the hair on the mask. Their costumes also include female clothing such as high boots and a chiton. Ceramic Athenian Pelike. Phiale Painter. Ancient Greek. Around 430 BCE. Museum of Fine Arts, Boston

In England, actors in Shakespearean plays, and all Elizabethan theatre (in the 1500s and 1600s), were all male; female parts were played by young men in drag because women were banned from performing publicly. Shakespeare used the conventions to enrich the gender confusions of As You Like It, and Ben Jonson manipulated the same conventions in Epicœne, or The Silent Woman (1609). During the reign of Charles II (1660–1685) the rules were relaxed to allow women to play female roles on the London stage, reflecting the French fashion, and the convention of men routinely playing female roles consequently disappeared.

In the 1890s, the slapstick drag traditions of undergraduate productions (notably Hasty Pudding Theatricals at Harvard College, annually since 1891, and at other Ivy League schools like Princeton University's Triangle Club or the University of Pennsylvania's Mask and Wig Club), and many other universities in which women were not permitted admission, were permissible fare to the same upper-class American audiences that were scandalized to hear that in New York City, rouged young men in skirts were standing on tables to dance the can-can in Bowery dives like The Slide.

Drag shows were popular night club entertainment in New York in the 1920s, then were forced underground, until the "Jewel Box Revue" played Harlem's Apollo Theater in the 1950s with their show, "49 Men and a Girl". For most of the performance, the "girls" were men in glamorous drag. At the end, the "one girl" was revealed to be the dashing young "man" in dinner clothes—Stormé DeLarverie—the MC who had been introducing each of the evening's acts.

The plot device of the film Shakespeare in Love (1998) turns upon the Elizabethan convention of the Shakespearean originals and the changes that came with women being allowed on stage during the reign of Charles II. However, drag remains a strong tradition in British comedy. This is seen in current-day British pantomime, where traditional roles such as the pantomime dame are played by a man in drag and the principal boy, such as Prince Charming or Dick Whittington, is played by a girl or young woman, as well as in comedy troupes such as Monty Python (formed in 1969).

Within the dramatic fiction, a double standard historically affected the uses of drag. In male-dominated societies where active roles were reserved to men, a woman might dress as a man under the pressures of her dramatic predicament. In these societies a man's position was above a woman's, causing a rising action that suited itself to tragedy, sentimental melodrama and comedies of manners that involved confused identities. A man dressed as a woman was thought to be a falling action only suited to broad low comedy and burlesque. Les Ballets Trockadero de Monte Carlo are an all-male ballet troupe where much of the humor is in seeing male dancers en travesti; performing roles usually reserved to females, wearing tutus and dancing en pointe with considerable technical skill.

These conventions of male-dominated societies were largely unbroken before the 20th century, when rigid gender roles were undermined and began to dissolve. This evolution changed drag in the last decades of the 20th century. Among contemporary drag performers, the theatrical drag queen or street queen may at times be seen less as a "female impersonator" per se, but simply as a drag queen. Examples include The Cockettes, Danny La Rue or RuPaul.

== Ball culture ==
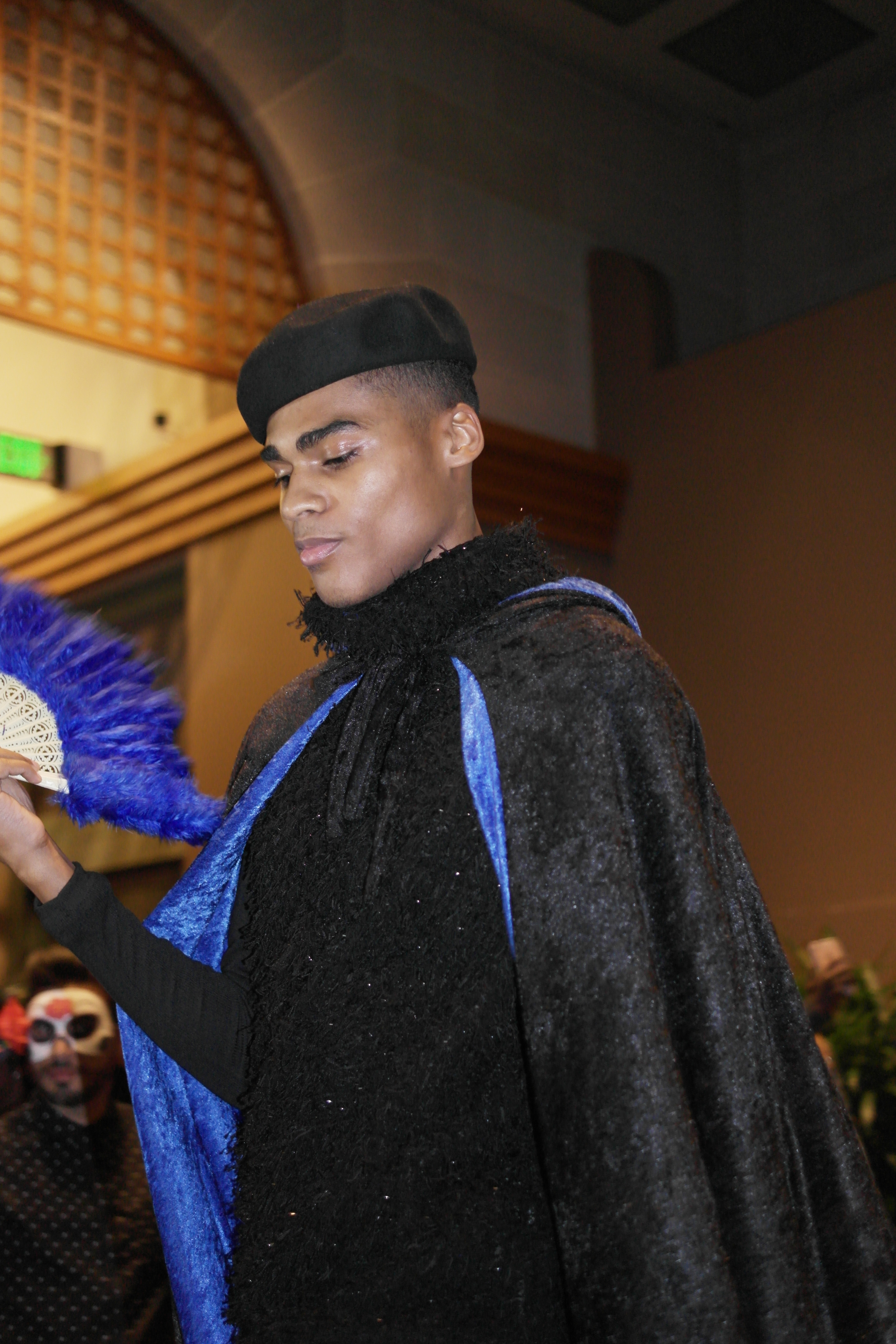
Contestant in a ball at the National Museum of African Art, 2016

Ballroom culture (also known as "ball culture", and other names) is an underground LGBT subculture that originated in 1920s New York in which people "walk" (i.e., compete) for trophies, prizes, and glory at events known as balls. Ball participants are mainly young African-American and Latin American members of the LGBTQ community. Attendees dance, vogue, walk, pose, and support one another in one or more of the numerous drag and performance competition categories. Categories are designed to simultaneously epitomize and satirize various genders, social classes and archetypes in society, while also offering an escape from reality. The culture extends beyond the extravagant formal events as many participants in ball culture also belong to groups known as "houses", a longstanding tradition in LGBT communities, and racial minorities, where chosen families of friends live in households together, forming relationships and community to replace families of origin from which they may be estranged.

Ball culture first gained exposure to a mainstream audience in 1990 when its voguing dance style was featured in Madonna's song "Vogue", and in Jennie Livingston's documentary Paris is Burning the same year. Voguing is a highly stylized type of modern house dance that emerged in the 1980s and evolved out of 1960s ball culture in Harlem, New York. In 2018, the American television series Pose showcased Harlem's ball culture scene of the 1980s and 1990s and was nominated for numerous awards.

== Opera ==
In Baroque opera, where soprano roles for men were sung by castrati, Handel's heroine Bradamante, in the opera Alcina, disguises herself as a man to save her lover, played by a male soprano; contemporary audiences were not the least confused. In Romantic opera, certain roles of young boys were written for alto and soprano voices and acted by women en travestie (in English, in "trouser roles"). The most familiar trouser role in pre-Romantic opera is Cherubino in Mozart's Marriage of Figaro (1786). In Beethoven's opera Fidelio Leonore, the faithful wife of Florestan, disguises herself as a man to save her husband. Romantic opera continued the convention: there are trouser roles for women in drag in Rossini's Semiramide (Arsace), Donizetti's Rosamonda d'Inghilterra and Anna Bolena, Berlioz's Benvenuto Cellini, and even a page in Verdi's Don Carlo. The convention was beginning to die out with Siebel, the ingenuous youth in Charles Gounod's Faust (1859) and the gypsy boy Beppe in Mascagni's L'Amico Fritz, so that Offenbach gave the role of Cupid to a real boy in Orphée aux Enfers. But Sarah Bernhardt played Hamlet in tights, giving French audiences a glimpse of Leg (the other in fact being a prosthesis) and Prince Orlovsky, who gives the ball in Die Fledermaus, is a mezzo-soprano, to somewhat androgynous effect. The use of travesti in Richard Strauss's Rosenkavalier (1912) is a special case, unusually subtle and evocative of its 18th-century setting, and should be discussed in detail at Der Rosenkavalier.

== Film and television ==
The self-consciously risqué bourgeois high jinks of Brandon Thomas's Charley's Aunt (London, 1892) were still viable theatre material in La Cage aux Folles (1978), which was remade, as The Birdcage, as late as 1996.

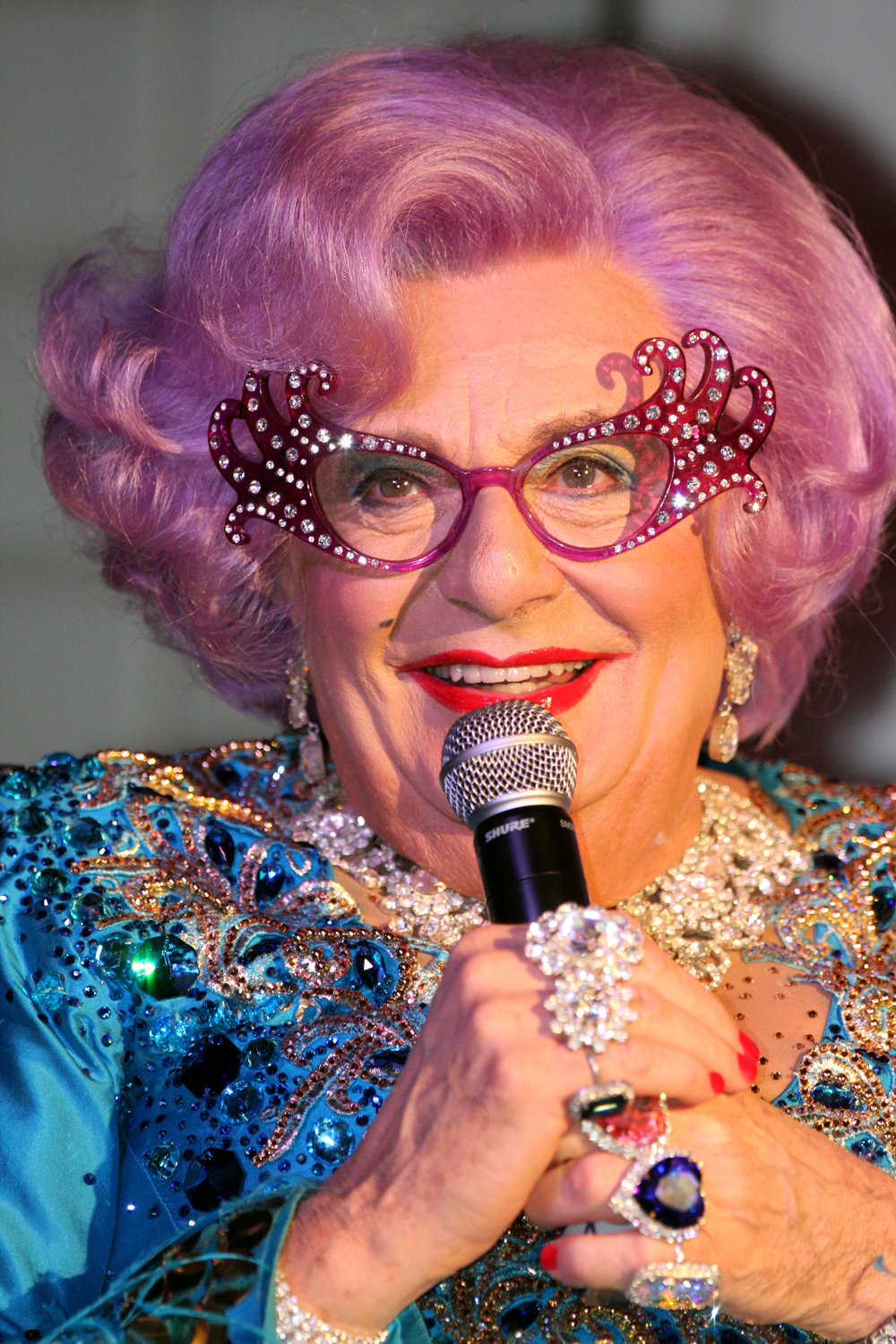
Dame Edna in 2012

Dame Edna, the drag persona of Australian actor Barry Humphries, was the host of several specials, including The Dame Edna Experience. Dame Edna also toured internationally, playing to sell-out crowds, and appeared on TV's Ally McBeal. Dame Edna represented an anomalous example of the drag concept. Her earliest incarnation was unmistakably a man dressed (badly) as a suburban housewife. Edna's manner and appearance became so feminised and glamorised that even some of her TV show guests appear not to see that the Edna character was played by a man. The furor surrounding Dame Edna's "advice" column in Vanity Fair magazine suggests that one of her harshest critics, actress Salma Hayek, was unaware Dame Edna was a female character played by a man.

In 2009, RuPaul's Drag Race first premiered as a television show in the United States. The show has gained mainstream and global appeal, and it has exposed multiple generations of audiences to drag culture.

=== United States ===
In the United States, early examples of drag clothing can be found in gold rush saloons of California. The Barbary Coast district of San Francisco was known for certain saloons, such as Dash, which attracted female impersonator patrons and workers.

William Dorsey Swann was the first person to call himself "queen of drag". He was a former slave, who was freed after the American Civil War, from Maryland. By the 1880s, he was organizing and hosting drag balls in Washington, D.C. The balls included folk dances, such as the cakewalk, and the male guests often dressed in female clothing.

In the early 20th century, drag—as an art form and culture—began to flourish with minstrel shows and vaudeville. Performers such as Julian Eltinge and Bothwell Browne were drag queens and vaudeville performers. The Progressive Era brought a decline in vaudeville entertainment, but drag culture began to grow in nightclubs and bars, such as Finnochio's Club and Black Cat Bar in San Francisco.

During this period, Hollywood films included examples of drag. While drag was often used as a last-resort tactic in situational farce (its only permissible format at the time), some films provided a more empathetic lens than others. In 1919, Bothwell Browne appeared in Yankee Doodle in Berlin. In 1933, Viktor und Viktoria came out in Germany, which later inspired First a Girl (1935) in the United States. That same year, Katharine Hepburn played a character who dressed as a male in Sylvia Scarlett. In 1959, drag made a big Hollywood splash in Some Like It Hot (1959).

In the 1960s, Andy Warhol and his Factory scene included superstar drag queens, such as Candy Darling and Holly Woodlawn, both immortalized in the Lou Reed song "Walk on the Wild Side".

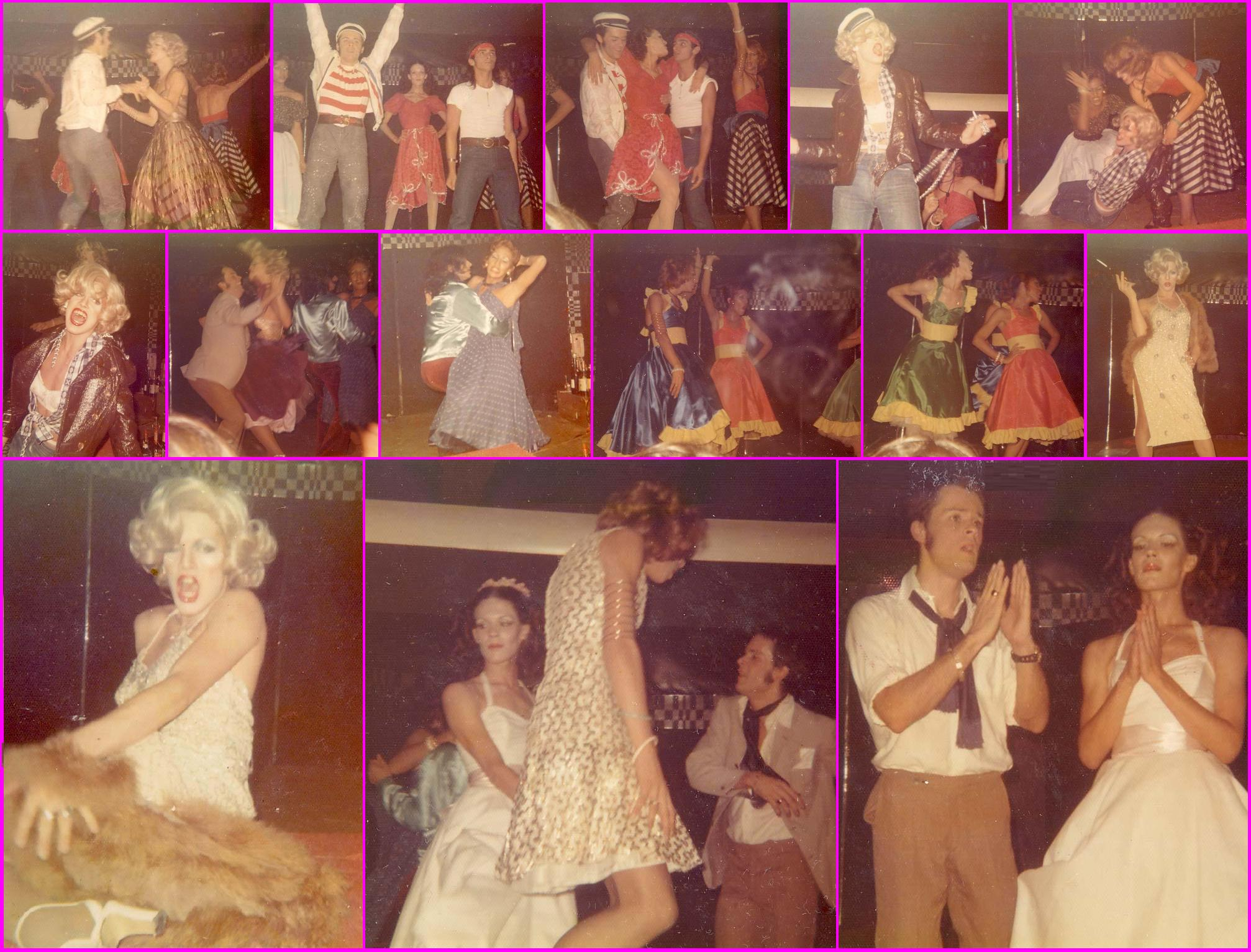
Examples of drag clothing provided and created by the performers themselves for an early Miami Beach version of Wild Side Story, 1973

By the early 1970s, drag was influenced by the psychedelic rock and hippie culture of the era. A San Francisco drag troupe, The Cockettes (1970–1972), performed with glitter eyeshadow and gilded mustaches and beards. The troupe also coined the term "genderfuck". Drag broke out from underground theatre in the persona of Divine in John Waters' Pink Flamingos (1972): see also Charles Pierce. The cult hit movie musical The Rocky Horror Picture Show (1975) inspired several generations of young people to attend performances in drag, although many of these fans would not call themselves drag queens or transvestites.

For many decades, on American network television, only the broadest slapstick drag tradition was generally represented. Few American TV comedians consistently used drag as a comedic device — Milton Berle, Flip Wilson, and Martin Lawrence, among others— although drag characters have occasionally been popular on sketch TV shows like In Living Color (with Jim Carrey's grotesque female bodybuilder) and Saturday Night Live (with the Gap Girls, among others). On the popular 1960s military sitcom, McHale's Navy, Ensign Parker (Tim Conway) sometimes had to dress in drag (often with hilarious results) whenever McHale and/or his crew had to disguise themselves in order to carry out their elaborate schemes. Gilligan's Island occasionally features men dressing in women's clothes, though this was not considered drag since it was not for a performance.

On stage and screen, the actor-playwright-screenwriter-producer Tyler Perry has included his drag character of Madea in some of his most noted productions, such as the stage play Diary of a Mad Black Woman and the feature film he based upon it.

Maximilliana and RuPaul co-star together in the TV show Nash Bridges starring Don Johnson and Cheech Marin during the two-part episode "'Cuda Grace". Maximilliana, looking passable, leads one of the investigators to believe he is "real" and sexually advances only to learn that he is, in fact, male, much to his chagrin.

=== United Kingdom ===
In the United Kingdom, drag has been more common in comedy, on both film and television. Alastair Sim plays the headmistress Miss Millicent Fritton in The Belles of St Trinian's (1954) and Blue Murder at St Trinian's (1957). He played the role straight; no direct joke about the actor's true gender is made. However, Miss Fritton is quite non-feminine in her pursuits of betting, drinking and smoking. The gag is that whilst her school sends out girls into a merciless world, it is the world that need beware. Despite this, or perhaps because of Sim's portrayal, subsequent films in the series went on to use actresses in the headmistress role (Dora Bryan and Sheila Hancock respectively). The 21st century re-boot of the series however reverted to drag, with Rupert Everett in the role.

On television, Benny Hill portrayed several female characters. The Monty Python troupe and The League of Gentlemen often played female parts in their skits. The League of Gentlemen are also credited with the first ever portrayal of "nude drag", where a man playing a female character is shown naked but still with the appropriate female anatomy, like fake breasts and a merkin. Within the conceit of the sketch/film, they are actually women: it is the audience who are in on the joke.

Monty Python women, whom the troupe called pepperpots, are random middle-aged working/lower middle class typically wearing long brown coats that were common in the 1960s. Save for a few characters played by Eric Idle, they looked and sounded very little like actual women with their caricatural outfits and shrill falsettos. However, when a sketch called for a "real" woman, the Pythons almost always called on Carol Cleveland. The joke is reversed in the Python film Life of Brian where "they" are pretending to be men, including obviously false beards, so that they can go to the stoning. When someone throws the first stone too early the Pharisee asks "who threw that", and they answer "she did, she did,..." in high voices. "Are there any women here today?" he says, "No no no" they say in gruff voices.

In the 1970s the most familiar drag artist on British television was Danny La Rue. La Rue's act was essentially a music hall one, following on from a much older, and less sexualised tradition of drag. His appearances were often in variety shows such as The Good Old Days (itself a pastiche of music hall) and Sunday Night at the London Palladium. Such was his popularity that he made a film, Our Miss Fred (1972). Unlike the "St Trinians" films, the plot involved a man having to dress as a woman.

David Walliams and (especially) Matt Lucas often play female roles in the television comedy Little Britain; Walliams plays Emily Howard—a "rubbish transvestite", who makes an unconvincing woman.

In the UK, non-comedic representations of drag acts are less common, and usually a subsidiary feature of another story. A rare exception is the television play (1968) and film (1973) The Best Pair of Legs in the Business. In the film version Reg Varney plays a holiday camp comedian and drag artist whose marriage is failing.

=== Canada ===
Early representations of drag in Canadian film included the 1971 film Fortune and Men's Eyes, adapted from a theatrical play by John Herbert, and the 1974 film Once Upon a Time in the East, adapted from a theatrical play by Michel Tremblay.

The 1977 film Outrageous!, starring Canadian drag queen Craig Russell as a fictionalized version of himself, was an important milestone in Canadian film, as one of the first gay-themed films ever to receive widespread theatrical distribution in North America. A sequel film, Too Outrageous!, was released in 1987.

In the 1980s, the sketch comedy series CODCO and The Kids in the Hall both made prominent use of drag performance. The Kids in the Hall consisted of five men, while CODCO consisted of three men and two women; however, all ten performers, regardless of their own gender, performed both male and female characters. Notably, both troupes also had openly gay members, with Scott Thompson of The Kids in the Hall and Greg Malone and Tommy Sexton of CODCO being important pioneers of gay representation on Canadian TV in their era. The use of drag in CODCO also transitioned to a lesser extent into the new series This Hour Has 22 Minutes in the 1990s; although cross-gender performance is not as central to 22 Minutes as it was in CODCO, Cathy Jones and Mary Walsh, the two cast members common to both series, both continued to play selected male characters.

The Canadian film Lilies, directed by John Greyson and adapted from a theatrical play by Michel Marc Bouchard, made use of drag as a dramatic device. Set in a men's prison, the film centres on a play within a play staged by one of the prisoners; however, as the roles in the play are performed by fellow prisoners, even the female characters within it are played by men, and the film blends scenes in which they are clearly depicted as men performing in their own clothes in the prison chapel with scenes in which they are performing in drag in more "realistic" settings. It became the first gay-themed film ever to win the Genie Award for Best Picture.

The short-lived French-language sitcom Cover Girl, aired in 2005 on Télévision de Radio-Canada, centred on three drag queens sharing ownership of a drag cabaret in Montreal.

In 2017 Ici ARTV aired Ils de jour, elles de nuit, a documentary series profiling Montreal drag queens Rita Baga, Barbada de Barbades, Gaby, Lady Boom Boom, Lady Pounana and Tracy Trash. The documentary web series Canada's a Drag, launched on CBC Gem in 2018, has profiled various Canadian drag performers, inclusive of all genders, over four seasons to date.

Canada's Drag Race, a Canadian spinoff of the American RuPaul's Drag Race franchise, was launched in 2020 on Crave. The same year also saw the release of Phil Connell's film Jump, Darling, centred on a young aspiring drag queen, and Thom Fitzgerald's film Stage Mother, about a religious woman who inherits her son's drag club after his death, as well as the comedy web series Queens, starring several real Toronto-area drag queens. 2023 saw the release of the films Enter the Drag Dragon, Solo, Gamodi and Queen Tut.

2024 saw the premiere of Slaycation, a competition series which sees queens from across the entire Drag Race franchise convene at a winter vacation resort in The Blue Mountains, competing in challenges to be named the Queen of Slaycation. In 2025, Canada's Drag Race season 1 winner Priyanka debuted Drag Brunch Saved My Life, a reality show in which she helps struggling restaurants reinvent themselves by launching drag brunch shows.

OutTV, a Canadian television channel devoted to LGBTQ programming, has aired the documentary series Drag Heals, the reality competition shows Call Me Mother and Sew Fierce, and the satirical reality competition parody Drag House Rules. It has also been directly involved as a production partner in some American programs, including The Boulet Brothers' Dragula and Hey Qween!.

In 2025, Documentary and CBC Gem premiered Michelle Ross: Unknown Icon, a documentary film by Alison Duke about Canadian drag icon Michelle Ross.

== Music ==
The world of popular music has a venerable history of drag. Marlene Dietrich was a popular actress and singer who sometimes performed dressed as a man, such as in the films Blue Angel and Morocco.

In the glam rock era many male performers (such as David Bowie and The New York Dolls) donned partial or full drag. This tradition waned somewhat in the late 1970s but was revived in the synth-pop era of the 1980s, as pop singers Boy George (of Culture Club), Pete Burns (of Dead or Alive), and Philip Oakey (of The Human League), frequently appeared in a sort of semi-drag, while female musicians of the era dabbled in their own form of androgyny, with performers like Annie Lennox, Phranc and The Bloods sometimes performing as drag kings.

The male grunge musicians of the 1990s sometimes performed wearing deliberately ugly drag—that is, wearing dresses but making no attempt to look feminine, not wearing makeup and often not even shaving their beards. (Nirvana did this several times, notably in the "In Bloom" video.) However, possibly the most famous drag artist in music in the 1990s was RuPaul. Maximilliana worked with RuPaul in the Nash Bridges episode "Cuda Grace" and was a regular at the now defunct Queen Mary Show Lounge in Studio City, California until the very end. Max (short for Maximilliana) is most well known for her performance as Charlie/Claire in Ringmaster: the Jerry Springer Movie. Max has also appeared in other movies including Shoot or Be Shot and 10 Attitudes as well as on television shows including Nash Bridges as mentioned above, Clueless, Gilmore Girls, The Tonight Show with Jay Leno, Mas Vale Tarde with Alex Cambert, MadTV, The Tyra Banks Show, The Tom Joyner Show, America's Got Talent, and many others.

In Japan there are several musicians in the visual kei scene, such as Mana (Moi dix Mois and Malice Mizer), Kaya (Schwarz Stein), Hizaki and Jasmine You (both Versailles), who always or usually appear in full or semi-drag.

== Drag kings and queens ==
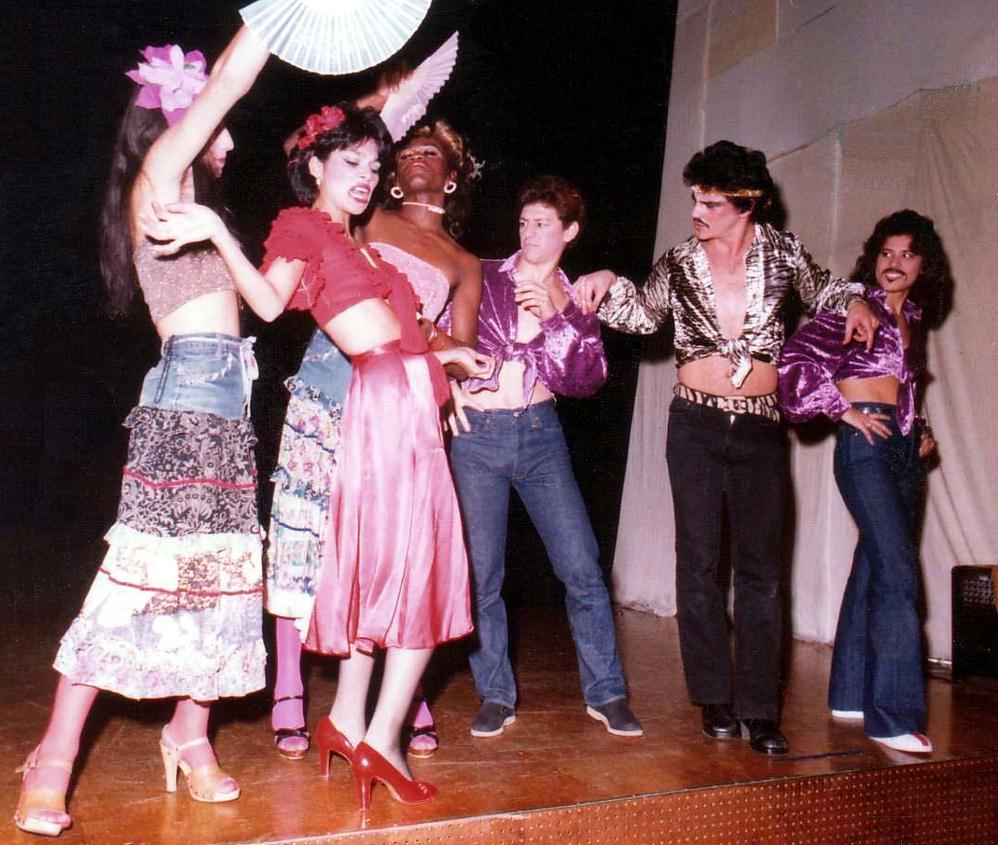
Two drag queens with a woman (left) and a drag king (far right) in Wild Side Story in Los Angeles, 1977

A drag queen (first use in print, 1941) is a person, usually a man, that dresses in drag, either as part of a performance or for personal fulfillment. The term "drag queen" distinguishes such men from transvestites, transsexuals or transgender people. Those who "perform drag" as comedy do so while wearing dramatically heavy and often elaborate makeup, wigs, and prosthetic devices (breasts) as part of the performance costume. Women who dress as men and perform as hypermasculine men are sometimes called drag kings; however, drag king also has a much wider range of meanings. It is currently most often used to describe entertainment (singing or lip-synching) in which there is no necessarily firm correlation between a performer's deliberately macho onstage persona and offstage gender identity or sexual orientation, just as individuals assigned male at birth who do female drag for the stage may or may not identify as being either gay or female in their real-life personal identities.

A bio queen, or female-bodied queen, on the other hand, is usually a cisgender woman performing in the same context as traditional (men-as-women) drag and displaying such features as exaggerated hair and makeup. Examples are the performance of the actress and singer Lady Gaga during her first appearance in the 2018 film A Star is Born, and singer-songwriter Chappell Roan's drag queen–influenced aesthetic.

Constructing a drag persona can be seen as a form of "stigma resistance", where consumers who practice drag are able to "embody pride" and work to combat stigma and shame. Stigma often operates through a process of shame, and drag queens are often both socially and economically marginalized. However, drag practices can also provide a means of stigma resistance, offering new ways of managing individual stigma with performances in a supportive community. Venkatraman et al's (2024) interviewees also highlighted that building pride in one's self and identity through drag could then permeate outward into other aspects of the drag performer's life, while Berkowitz and Belgrave (2010) indicate the empowering rewards of drag.

== Criticism ==
Drag has sometimes been criticized as sexist, misogynist, or as presenting stereotypes of women in a way that can be humiliating to women.

== See also ==
- En femme
- List of transgender-related topics
- List of drag queens
- Travesti (theatre)
