= For the Love of DILFS =

American reality dating television series

- Genre: Reality dating competition
- Presented by: Stormy Daniels
- Narrated by: Phil Horn
- Country of origin: United States
- Original language: English
- No. of seasons: 3
- No. of episodes: 27

Production
- Running time: 37–53 minutes
- Production company: Daddy TV

Original release
- Network: OUTtv
- Release: January 31, 2023 – February 4, 2025

For the Love of DILFs is an American reality dating competition series produced by Daddy TV for OUTtv. Hosted by Stormy Daniels, the series premiered on January 31, 2023. Three seasons and 27 episodes had been released as of February 2025.

The series brings together two groups of gay men identified by the program as "Daddies" and "Himbos". The contestants live together in a residence known as DILF Mansion, participate in challenges and dates, and form romantic pairings. The winning couple receives $10,000 as an investment in their relationship.

== Format ==
For the Love of DILFs divides its cast into "Daddies", generally older men, and "Himbos", generally younger men. The groups live together at DILF Mansion, where contestants date one another and take part in challenges while attempting to establish romantic relationships.

Contestants may change partners during the competition, and new Daddies and Himbos can enter DILF Mansion after the initial cast has arrived. Eliminations reduce the group until the remaining couples reach the finale. Previously eliminated contestants return to vote for the couple they consider most likely to succeed, with the winning couple receiving $10,000 toward their relationship.

Daniels serves as host and relationship adviser and lives alongside the contestants during filming. An unseen figure known as "Dr. DILF", voiced by Phil Horn, narrates portions of the series and communicates with Daniels.

== Production ==
=== Season 1 ===
OUTtv announced For the Love of DILFs on October 13, 2022, as one of three new unscripted series commissioned from Daddy TV. The original order consisted of eight hour-long episodes.

In November 2022, Deadline Hollywood reported that Stormy Daniels had been selected to host the series. Daniels was also to live with the contestants and provide relationship advice during the competition. Daddy TV co-founder Topher Cusumano said the concept was based around two gay archetypes, Daddies and Himbos, that had developed substantial followings online.

The first season was filmed at a mansion in Florida. It premiered on January 31, 2023, with eight episodes released through March 28. Gordon Osborne and Mateo Escobar were selected by their castmates as the first-season winners.

=== Season 2 ===
On February 23, 2023, OUTtv renewed the series for a 10-episode second season, less than a month after its premiere. The network said that total viewed minutes and unique views on OUTtv.com had each increased by more than 140 percent following the launch of the first season.

In June 2023, OUTtv announced a multi-year first-look development agreement with Daddy TV. The second season of For the Love of DILFs was identified as the first commission under the agreement and was scheduled to begin filming in July 2023.

The second season premiered on January 23, 2024. The season consisted of 10 episodes, with its finale released on March 26, 2024. Nigel Battle and Rico Prada won the season, defeating fellow finalists Derrick Hart and Anthony Hairston.

=== Season 3 ===
OUTtv announced the third season on September 26, 2024. The season moved the contestants into a new DILF Mansion and retained Daniels as host. It premiered on November 26, 2024.

Tony Randel, who had previously competed on the series, returned for the third season. The nine-episode season concluded on February 4, 2025. Randel and Jay Seabrook won the final vote over Robert and Samuel.

== Series overview ==
Season	Episodes	Premiere	Finale	Winning couple	Prize
1	8	January 31, 2023	March 28, 2023	Gordon Osborne; Mateo Escobar	$10,000 investment into the couple's relationship
2	10	January 23, 2024	March 26, 2024	Nigel Battle; Rico Prada	$10,000 investment into the couple's relationship
3	9	November 26, 2024	February 4, 2025	Tony Randel; Jay Seabrook	$10,000 investment into the couple's relationship

== Reception ==
The first season attracted reviews from mainstream and LGBTQ-focused publications. Rebecca Nicholson of The Guardian gave the series three out of five stars and compared its format to a queer version of Love Island. She praised the program's self-awareness, the rapport between Daniels and the contestants, and its willingness to incorporate the contestants' personal stories alongside its comedic tone.

Coleman Spilde of The Daily Beast gave the series a positive review, praising its humor, deliberately unpolished presentation and Daniels's involvement with the contestants. Spilde argued that the program succeeded by embracing its outlandish premise rather than presenting itself as a more conventional dating competition.

Decider critic Brett White also responded positively to the show's low-budget aesthetic. Metacritic listed three professional reviews of the series, assigning converted scores of 80 from The Daily Beast, 80 from Decider and 60 from The Guardian.

Writing for Queerty, Josh Galassi praised the show's camp tone, diversity among the contestants and use of new arrivals and other reality-television twists.
