= Group Sext =

Canadian reality television series

Group Sext is a Canadian reality dating show, which premiered on OutTV in 2020. Produced by Go Button Media and hosted by Crystal, a Canadian drag queen best known for competing on RuPaul's Drag Race UK, the series uses the social distancing restrictions in place during the COVID-19 pandemic to present "masterdaters" who must choose from among ten potential love interests based entirely on texting, before having a first date with their final choice through a video call.

The pilot was greenlit by OutTV in summer 2020, and aired in the fall as a special. The network subsequently announced in November 2020 that it had approved six additional episodes.
