= Meags Fitzgerald =

Canadian illustrator and cartoonist

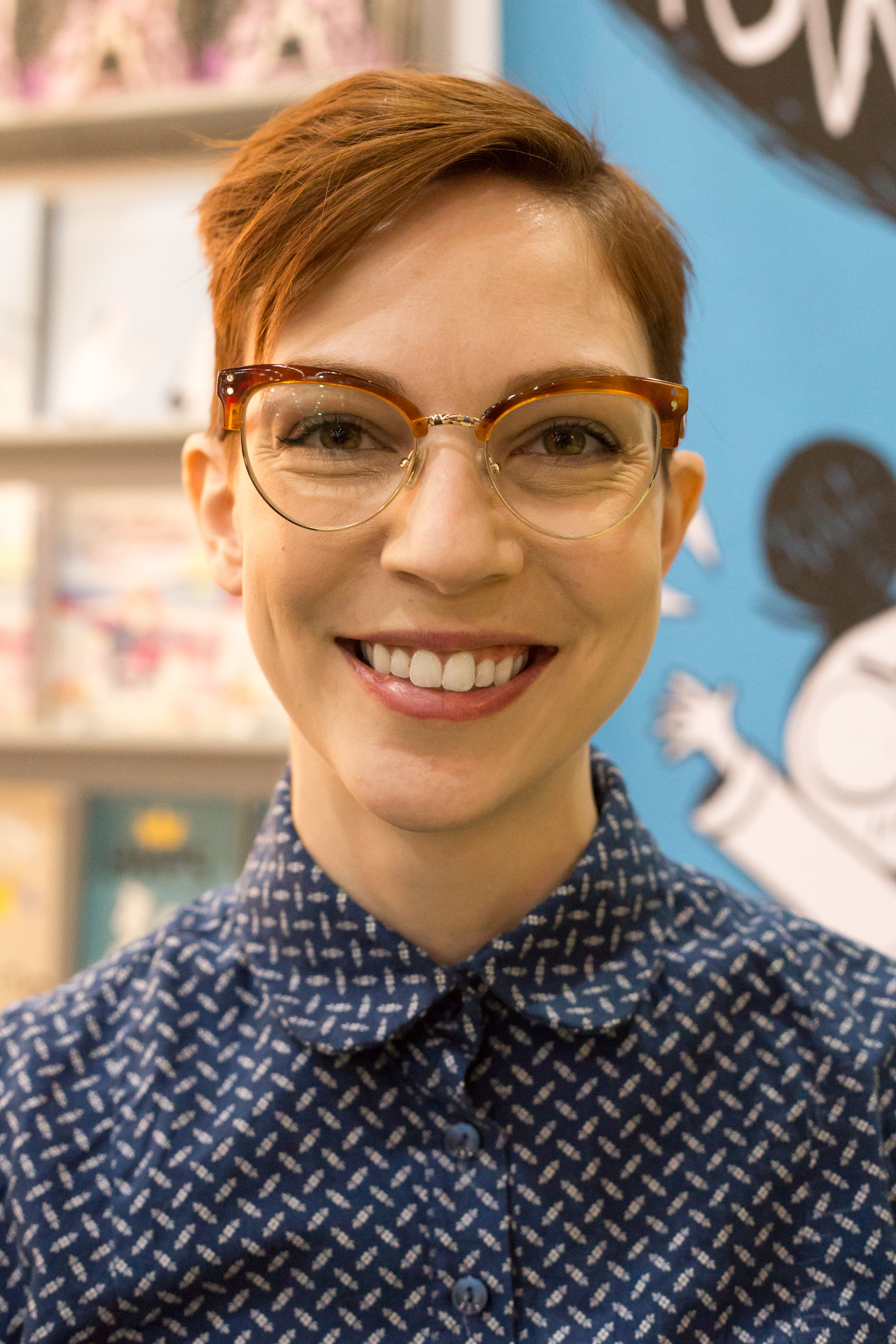
- Meags Fitzgerald in 2018
- Born: Edmonton, Alberta, Canada
- Other name: HercuSleaze
- Website: www.meagsfitzgerald.com

Meags Fitzgerald is a Canadian drag king, illustrator and cartoonist.

== Career ==
Fitzgerald earned a Bachelor of Fine Arts from the Alberta College of Art and Design in Calgary in 2009 and a certificate in design from NSCAD University in Halifax in 2012. She worked mainly as an illustrator, graphic novelist and comedic improviser before becoming a drag king.

Fitzgerald published Photobooth: A Biography in 2014, a non-fiction graphic novel detailing her interest in chemical photobooths. The book won the 2015 Doug Wright Spotlight Award. She followed it in 2015 with the autobiographical graphic novel Long Red Hair.

In 2019, she was nominated for the Prism Prize Award for directing a music video for Rich Aucoin's song The Middle.

Fitzgerald's drag king pseudonym is HercuSleaze (pronouns he/him). He was a contestant on the first season of the reality TV competition Call Me Mother. In 2022 HercuSleaze performed at Fierté Montréal's Superstars show to a crowd of 30,000 people, making him one of the first drag kings to perform to an audience of this size.

Fitzgerald identifies as queer.

== Bibliography ==
- Photobooth: A Biography (2014)
- Long Red Hair (2015)
