= Sew Fierce =

Canadian reality television series

Sew Fierce is a Canadian reality television series, which premiered in 2023 on OutTV. Hosted by Barbada de Barbades in the first season and Crystal in the second alongside Jaime "Lucinda Miu" Lujan as a judge, the series is a drag design competition, in which eight clothing designers compete to make the best drag outfits to be modeled on the runway by various emerging queens.

The competitors in the first season were Bebe Brunjes, Benjamin Toner, Dianna DiNoble, Missy Morrow, Seven MacLennan-Nobrega, Kyle Sherwin, Rich “Gidget Galore” Kuntz and Terrence O'Brian Henderson, with Toner winning the competition. The season also saw guest appearances by established drag figures such as performers Spikey Van Dykey, Kiki Coe and Priyanka, and fashion designer Evan Clayton.

The first season premiered April 14, 2023, on OutTV, on both its television channel and its OutTVGo and Froot streaming platforms. OutTV subsequently renewed the series for a second season, with Crystal joining the panel. The second season premiered in April 2024, with Henderson, as winner of the Audience Favourite vote in the first season, returning for another shot at the competition alongside new competitors Calypso Cosmic, Dustin Ceithamer, Dustin George, Justin Velarde, Lindey Kapitzke, Sean Michael, Terrah Card, and Tony Eliason.

OutTV has announced that a third season of the show will enter production in 2025.

== Winners ==
- Season 1 - Benjamin Toner
- Season 2 - Justin Velarde
