= Adam All =

British Drag King, performer and host

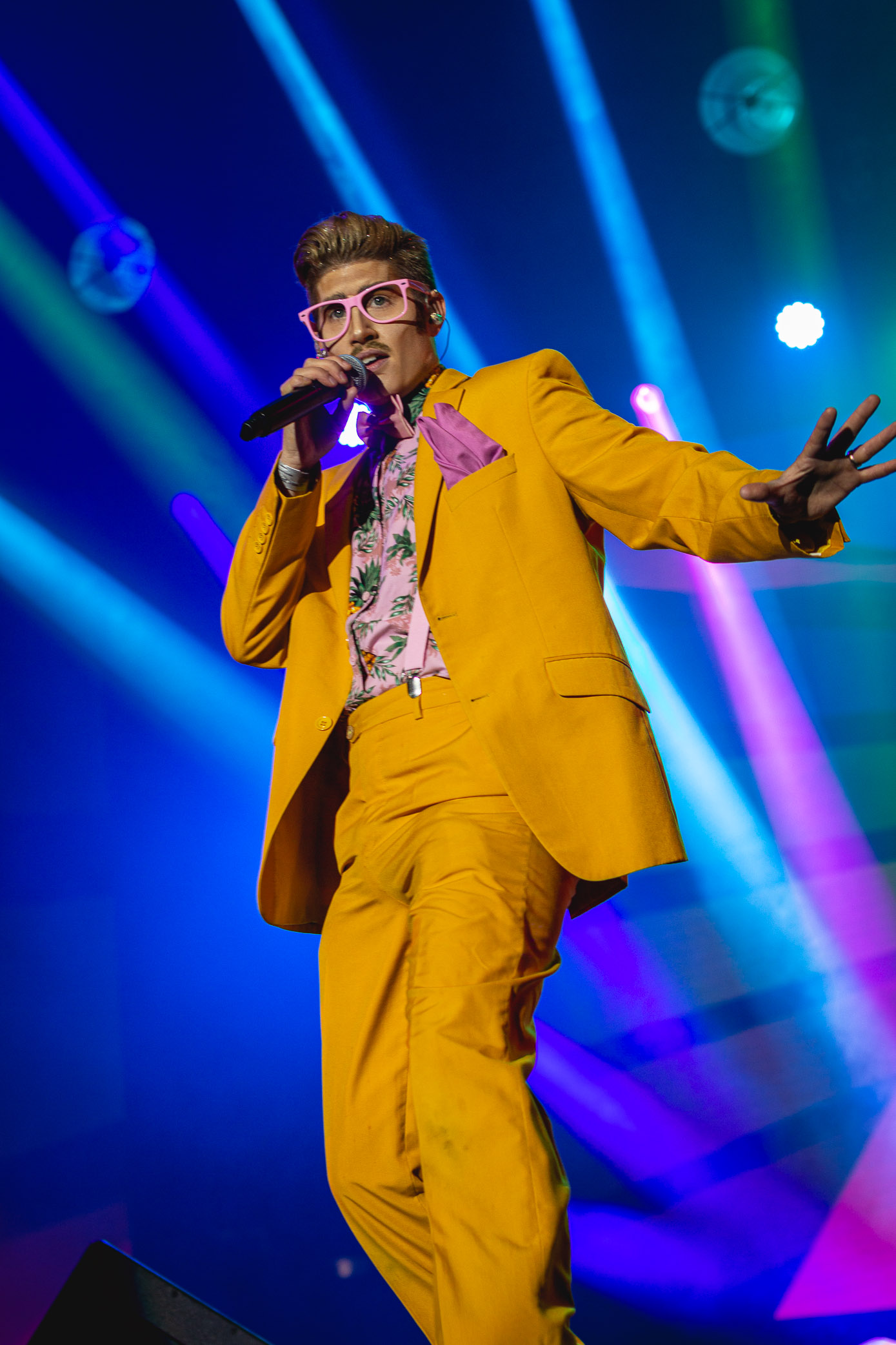
- Adam All on the main stage at World Pride
- Born: Jen Powell
- Education: Manchester Metropolitan University
- Occupations: Drag king, performer, host
- Spouse: Eleanor Burke
- Website: www.adamall.co.uk

Jen Powell, better known by their stage name Adam All, is a British drag king, performer and host.

== Early life and background ==
Powell was born and grew up in Winchester, and performs as a Drag King under the name Adam All. Growing up, Powell was often mistaken for a boy and cites this as one of their earliest inspirations to dress in male clothing. Powell also cites novel Tipping the Velvet by Sarah Waters, which was adapted into a BBC Dramatization in 2000, as a key inspiration. Powell explained in their TEDX Talk that Drag has been integral to them exploring and finding their own gender identity.

Powell studied contemporary arts at Manchester Metropolitan University and has an extensive background in music, having taken lessons on seven instruments, eventually focusing on the saxophone and the ukulele. Singing is Powell and Adam's primary form of musical expression, particularly 80s power ballads and stadium rock. Comedy is also integral to their art.

== Career ==
Powell began their drag career in 2008 in Southampton in England with their first show at local gay bar "The London Hotel." Adam All continued to perform across the UK Drag Circuit, where there were few Drag Kings. In 2009 Adam All was the first Drag King to get to the final of National Drag Competition "Drag Idol".

Adam All continued to work as a Drag King and in 2013 set up Drag King Cabaret night 'BOiBOX' at legendary lesbian bar 'The Candy Bar' in Soho, London with their partner Apple Derrières to provide a platform for other Drag Kings. Adam All also co-hosts Europe's biggest Drag King Contest 'Man Up'.

Adam All has been described as a pioneer for the modern UK Drag King Scene by 'rewriting the rules of masculinity' and challenging gender stereotypes and perspectives, "redefining Drag." In 2019 Adam All won the award for Best Drag King at the QX Awards. and in 2023, Adam All won "Drag Artist of the Year" at the PinkNews Awards of Pink News, becoming the first drag king to win the award. Adam All won the award alongside Drag Queen "That Girl."

== Personal life ==
Powell is nonbinary and is married to actor Eleanor Burke, who performs alongside them as drag queen Apple Derrières.
