= Crystal (drag queen) =

British-Canadian drag queen

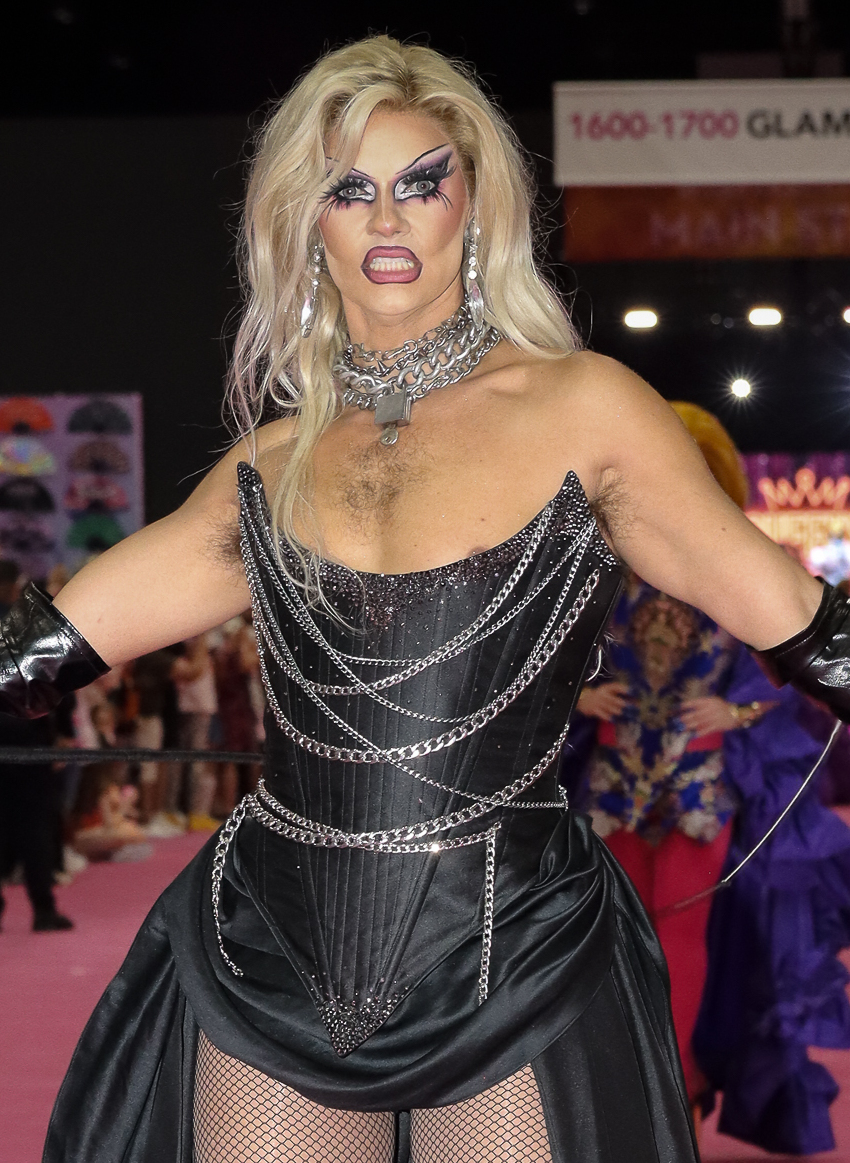
- Crystal at RuPaul's DragCon LA, 2024
- Born: Colin Munro Seymour; November 1, 1985 (age 40); Newfoundland, Newfoundland and Labrador, Canada
- Occupation: Drag queen
- Family: Susan Goyette (stepmother)
- Website: crystalwillseeyounow.com

Crystal is the stage name of Colin Munro Seymour (born November 1, 1984), a Canadian-British drag queen, TV host and personality best known as a competitor in the first season of RuPaul's Drag Race UK.

== Early life ==
Born in Newfoundland and raised in Nova Scotia, Munro is the stepson of poet Susan Goyette.

Munro attended university for costume design, as mentioned in his podcast.

== Career ==
Munro moved to London, England in the late 2000s, initially to work as an aerial performer in the circus, before expanding into drag performance. He initially went by the drag name Crystal Beth, a pun on crystal meth, but changed his drag name to just Crystal before appearing on Drag Race UK on the grounds that he did not want to be perceived as making fun of the serious issue of drug addiction. Munro has also stated that he always wanted to be known as just Crystal, and initially chose the longer name only because when he was new to drag he thought there was a rule that drag queens always had to have two names rather than one. In London's drag scene, Crystal was best known for Mariah and Friendz, a regular drag night inspired by Mariah Carey and, in Crystal's own words, "bringing in touches of delusion, bad fashion and lip-sync malfunctions."

Crystal finished in sixth place on Drag Race UK, being eliminated in the "Girl Group Battle Royale" challenge, after losing a lip-sync to eventual winner The Vivienne.

Following Drag Race UK, Crystal appeared as a special guest in the "Star Sixty-Nine" episode of Canada's Drag Race, playing the caller to a psychic hotline in a minichallenge where the competing queens had to do improv comedy as the psychics. She was subsequently announced as the host of Group Sext, a social distancing-themed LGBTQ dating reality show, for OutTV, and as a drag mentor in the competition series Call Me Mother.

In 2024 she hosted the second season of the drag design competition series Sew Fierce.

== 2023 Adventure Island Pride event ==
On July 17 2023, the Adventure Island theme park in Southend-on-Sea decided not to host future Pride events after a controversial performance by Crystal. He expressed disappointment, accusing corporations of exploiting Pride for profit. Crystal defended the act, involving an angle grinder, stating it was similar to performances on shows like Britain's Got Talent or by pop stars like Lady Gaga. However, theme park owner Philip Miller cited confusion over acceptable content and emphasized the park's family-friendly focus. Miller apologized for any offense caused and announced the park's decision not to participate in future Pride celebrations.

== Defamation lawsuit ==
In October 2020, right-wing political activist Laurence Fox made a series of tweets in which he accused Crystal and Simon Blake, deputy chair of the LGBT rights charity Stonewall, both gay men, of being paedophiles. Fox's comments were criticised for their "homophobic connotations" linked to the far-right LGBT grooming conspiracy theory.

In April 2021, Crystal and Blake lodged a claim for defamation in the High Court and were joined in the legal action by actress Nicola Thorp, whom Fox also called a paedophile.

In May 2022, Fox was ordered to pay £36,000 legal fees to Crystal, Blake and Thorp after he attempted to secure a jury trial claiming that "a judge could show involuntary bias", however his request was denied.

In August 2023, Justice Nicklin found that Fox's tweets would be viewed as factual statements that would have been understood to mean each of the three "was a paedophile". Fox appealed the rule by Justice Nicklin.

In January 2024, Justice Collins Rice ruled that Fox had defamed Crystal and Simon Blake. On 25 April 2024, it was announced that Fox would have to pay a total of £180,000 in compensatory damages to Crystal and Blake.

== Filmography ==
=== Television ===
Year	Title	Role	Notes	Ref.
2019	RuPaul's Drag Race UK	Herself	Contestant; series 1	
2020	Canada's Drag Race	Herself	Guest in episode "Star Sixty-Nine"	
2020	Group Sext	Herself	Host	
2021	Celebrity Karaoke Club Drag Edition	Herself	Contestant	
2021–present	Call Me Mother	Herself	Drag mother	
