= Barbada de Barbades =

Canadian drag queen

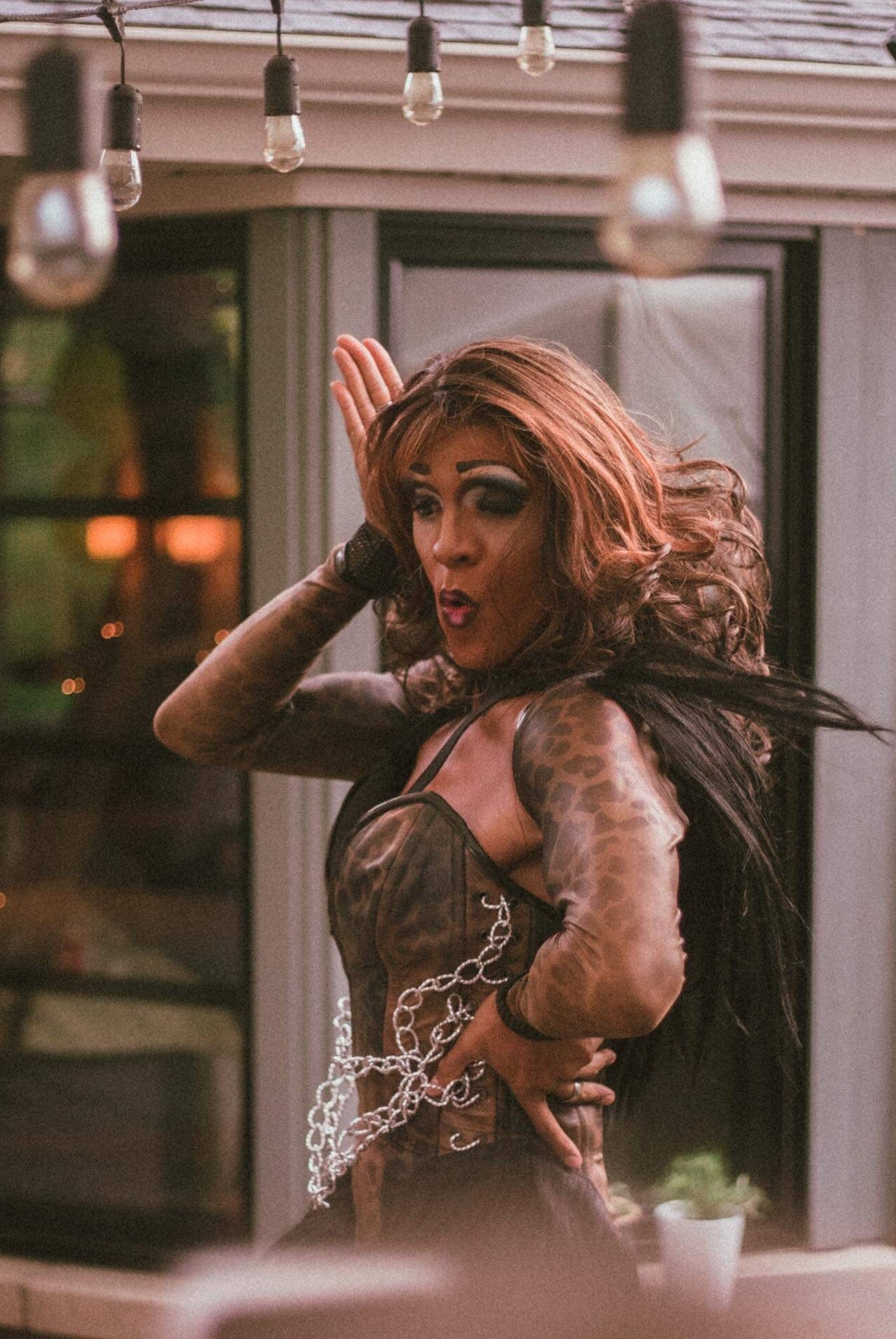
- Barbada at a show, 2020
- Born: Sébastien Potvin
- Occupations: Drag queen, music teacher, television host
- Years active: 2005–present
- Known for: Call Me Mother

Barbada de Barbades is the stage name of Sébastien Potvin, a Canadian drag queen and a television host. He is best known as one of the drag house mothers in the reality competition series Call Me Mother.

== Career ==
Potvin, the Black Canadian son of a Barbadian father and a Québécois mother, first began performing in drag when he entered the 2005 Star Search drag competition at Cabaret Mado. Although he was eliminated from the competition, he entered again in 2006 and won. He continued to perform regularly in drag at Cabaret Mado, becoming one of the club's regular headliners and winning Rita Baga's Mx Fierté pageant in 2017.

In 2017, Potvin participated in Ils de jour, elles de nuit, an Ici ARTV documentary series about drag queens, alongside Rita Baga, Gaby, Lady Boom Boom, Lady Pounana, and Tracy Trash.

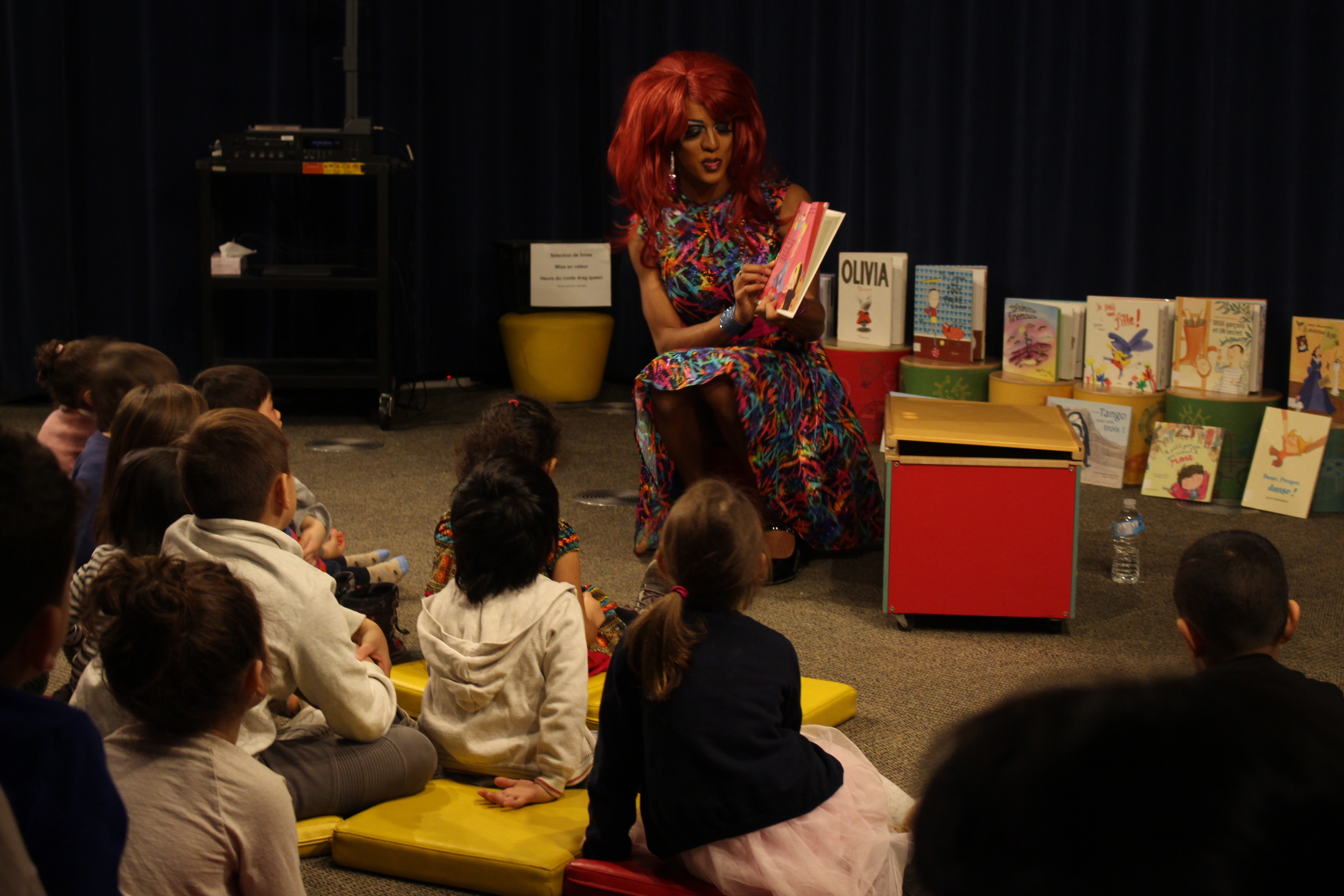
Bardada during a Drag Queen storytime at the Grande Bibliothèque in Montreal, 2018.

Potvin, an elementary school music teacher by profession, has also been prominently associated with Drag Queen Story Hours in Montreal, including an annual special event at the Grande Bibliothèque of the Bibliothèque et Archives nationales du Québec, and is a frequent host of Montreal drag brunch events.

Since 2021, he has served as one of the drag house mothers in the first season of the reality competition series Call Me Mother. The series was the highest-rated original production in OutTV's history. Two days after the first-season finale, OutTV announced the renewal of the series for a second season, which aired in 2022.

In 2022, Potvin debuted as the host of Barbada, a children's series about music which was broadcast by Ici Radio-Canada Télé.

On September 18, 2022, Barbada de Barbades, Rita Baga and Mona de Grenoble presented an award at the Prix Gémeaux ceremony, reading the nominees before bringing out Gisèle Lullaby, the third season winner of Canada's Drag Race, to announce the winner.

In 2023, she also hosted the first season of the drag design competition series Sew Fierce.

In 2025 she was announced as having a supporting role in the upcoming television series adaptation of Bon Cop, Bad Cop. In September 2025, Barbada was a co-host of Drag! d’la tête aux pieds on TFO alongside drag queen Sami Landri.

== Filmography ==
=== Film ===
Year	Title	Role	Notes	Ref.
2025	OutSpoken: Scene Queen Montreal	Himself (in drag)	Interviewee, Documentory	

=== Television ===
Year	Title	Role	Notes	Ref.
2017	Ils de jour, Elles de nuit	Himself (in and out of drag)	Documentary television series	
2021—2022	Call Me Mother	Himself (in drag)	Mother/mentor	
2022	Barbada	Himself (in drag)	Host	
2023	Sew Fierce	Himself (in drag)	Host	
2024	Big Brother Célébrités	Himself (out of drag)		
2025	Drag! d'la tête aux pieds	Himself (in drag)	Co-hosted with Sami Landri	
2026	Bon Cop, Bad Cop	Barbada		
