= OUTtv (Canadian TV channel) =

Canadian LGBT specialty television channel

- Country: Canada
- Broadcast area: Nationwide
- Headquarters: Vancouver, British Columbia

Programming
- Language: English
- Picture format: 1080i HDTV

Ownership
- Owner: OUTtv Media Global Inc.
- Key people: Brad Danks, CEO

History
- Launched: September 7, 2001; 25 years ago
- Former names: PrideVision TV (2001–2004); HARD on PrideVision (2004–2005)

Links
- Website: outtvglobal.com

OUTtv is a Canadian English language speciality channel and streaming network that was launched in September 2001. The brand focuses on general entertainment and lifestyle programming serving Canadian and international LGBT+ communities.

The network is owned by OUTtv Media Global Inc., majority owned (51%) by Ronald N. Stern through OM Acquisitions.

== History ==
=== As PrideVision ===
Logo as PrideVision TV used from 2001 to 2004.

The channel was launched on September 7, 2001 as PrideVision TV. Owned by Headline Media Group, it was Canada's first 24-hour cable television channel targeted at LGBT audiences. It was also the second LGBT-focused channel to be established in the world, after the Gay Cable Network in the U.S., which shut down in 2001. PrideVision TV was one of 21 digital specialty services that were granted a Category 1 license by the Canadian Radio-television and Telecommunications Commission (CRTC) on November 24, 2000; all digital cable and direct-broadcast satellite providers would be obliged to carry the network in their lineup. Headline Media Group owned 70.1% of the licence, while Alliance Atlantis owned the remaining interest. In February 2001, before the channel was launched, Alliance Atlantis sold its entire interest in the licence to Headline Media Group, which became the sole owner of the licence.

The network launched with a lineup of lifestyle and general entertainment programming, consisting of dramas, comedies, feature films, documentaries and talk shows during the day and in prime time, as well as pornographic films nightly after 12:00 a.m. Eastern Time.

As PrideVision, the channel maintained a national advisory committee to provide input and feedback on the station's programming and its effectiveness at serving LGBT communities. The committee included businessman and activist Jim Deva, Outlooks publisher Roy Heale, Egale Canada executive director John Fisher, Suzanne Girard of Divers/Cité, Carmela Laurignano of Evanov Communications, Winnipeg mayor Glen Murray, Toronto city councillor Kyle Rae, Metropolitan Community Church of Toronto pastor Brent Hawkes, Ruby Hamilton of PFLAG and Halifax businesswoman Shelley Taylor.

==== Carriage difficulties ====
PrideVision had considerable difficulty building an audience in its early years, due primarily to its pornographic programming: the network did not have a timeshift channel for the West Coast, which led to PrideVision's adult content airing as early as 9:00 p.m. in the Pacific Time Zone. As such, the channel was marketed by many television providers as a standalone, premium service adult channel, rather than in a bundle with other specialty services, considerably reducing the number of potential subscribers. The channel also faced particular resistance from Shaw Cable, the largest cable television provider in Western Canada, which was accused of constraining the availability of PrideVision during the channel's first few months in operation. During a three-month-long free preview period that was mandated by the CRTC to help launch the slate of new digital specialty channels that had launched at that time, Shaw offered the channel on a "request-only" basis, requiring viewers to go through multiple menus and to call the provider, being charged 1 cent to be able to view PrideVision. This process was not required for any other similarly-licensed specialty channel. PrideVision took its concerns to the CRTC, who sided with the network and ordered Shaw to properly offer a free preview of PrideVision to its customers.

Mounting issues with distribution, disputes with television service providers, slow growth among digital channels industry-wide, and criticisms around providing a weak mix of programming all combined to affect PrideVision; it was losing a considerable amount of money. The channel's subscriber base grew much more slowly than expected, with only roughly 20,000 subscribers by the end of 2002 compared to channels such as IFC, which had over 520,000 subscribers in the same time period. To help grow its subscriber base, PrideVision offered another free preview period to its distributors, and launched an advertising campaign comparing this business situation to impotency. Many in the gay community interpreted this as the company blaming them for the channel's problems, although the owners denied this. Despite this, PrideVision's subscriptions did increase slowly. In an effort to reduce its losses, staff at PrideVision were cut from 25 to 10, most of its original programming was dropped, and the street-level studio on Church Street in Toronto was closed in December 2002.

=== Sale, split, and re-launch as OUTtv ===
Hard on PrideVision logo.

On December 3, 2003, Headline Media Group announced that it was selling a majority interest in PrideVision to 6166954 Canada, Inc., a consortium led by broadcaster William Craig. Craig would own the majority share in the company and act as managing partner, while Pink Triangle Press and various other independent production companies and investors held minority stakes. Headline Media retained a minority stake in the company. The transaction was finalized later in 2004.

In September 2004, 6166954 Canada submitted an application to the CRTC for a new premium service, which would be devoted to gay adult programming. In November, PrideVision expanded its adult programming—now branded with the double entendre-tinged monicker Hard on PrideVision—into primetime (from 9:00 p.m.—6:00 a.m. Eastern Time), in preparation for the expansion of the block into a 24-hour service, alongside a non-adult network tentatively named "Glow TV".

In February 2005, it was officially announced that PrideVision would drop its adult programming and re-launch as OUTtv in March 2005, alongside the launch of the standalone Hard on PrideVision channel. Its license was approved on March 4, 2005. Craig explained that the removal of adult programming would make OUTtv more attractive to television providers and improve its distribution, and the narrower focus would allow the two networks to expand their lineups with more programming of interest to the LGBT community.

Logo as OUTtv used from 2005 to 2008.

Hard on PrideVision was expected to launch on April 7, 2005, but the launch was delayed to April 12 due to difficulties gaining carriage. Concurrently with the official launch of Hard, PrideVision was re-branded as OUTtv, with a 24-hour lineup of general entertainment and lifestyle programming. Even with the launch of Hard and the removal of all adult content from the newly renamed OUTtv, the channel was still facing resistance from Shaw Communications and its national satellite television service, Star Choice. Both distributors wanted to continue packaging OUTtv as a standalone premium service rather than a general interest specialty channel, which most other major television providers had done. OUTtv filed a complaint with the CRTC; however, the parties settled their disagreement before the matter was taken to a hearing before the CRTC and had agreed on a packaging deal. A similar deal was made with Bell later that year.

=== Acquisition by Shavick Entertainment ===
Logo used from 2008 to July 1, 2012.

On July 19, 2006, Shavick Entertainment, a film and television producer based in Vancouver, British Columbia, announced it would acquire the majority interest in both OUTtv and Hard on PrideVision from William Craig. Shavick also announced plans to rename OUTtv, upgrade the technology infrastructure, and provide a wider variety of programming to the channel. Shavick listed its Hollywood-based partner Regent Studios, owners of American LGBT channel here!, as a major content provider to the channel.

In 2008, the channel ended its long-standing dispute with Shaw Cable, securing an agreement that would see the channel marketed and distributed in the same package as other Category A digital channels.

On December 3, 2009, the CRTC approved an application that would see HardTV sold and spun off into its own company, 4510810 Canada Inc., a company owned by Pink Triangle Press (55%) and Peace Point Entertainment (45%). The transaction closed at a later date.

On May 23, 2012, OUTtv announced that it had passed 1 million subscribers, and would launch a high-definition feed on July 2, 2012. Concurrently, the network also introduced a new logo and refreshed on-air branding. The HD simulcast feed was launched on July 2, and the new website was launched on January 17, 2013.

In December 2012, Shavick Entertainment purchased Pink Triangle Press's 24.94% interest and Peace Point Entertainment Group's 15% interest in the channel.

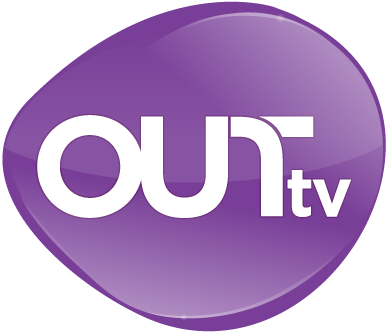
Logo from 2012 to 2021.

Under Shavick's management, the channel has seen significant increases in its subscriber base, going from just 185,000 subscribers when they first purchased the channel to over 1.2 million in 2008. OUTtv would become a partner in Wolfe Video's GayDirect, a premium subscription channel for LGBT content on YouTube, during this period. OUTtv's improved ratings have been attributed to domestic airings of Logo TV's RuPaul's Drag Race. The channel would also produce aftershow features for Drag Race, with Richard Ryder in character as drag queen Wilma Fingerdoo. OUTtv has also seen ratings success with original drama series Sex & Violence, created by Canadian film director Thom Fitzgerald.

In 2013, the channel applied to the CRTC to have its Canadian content commitment reduced from 49 to 35 per cent of revenues. According to chief operations officer Bradley Danks, the library of viable LGBT-themed Canadian programming is limited enough that the channel has sometimes had to rely on repeat airings of programming from other networks, such as the talk shows 1 Girl 5 Gays and Steven & Chris, on "not obviously gay" programs such as The New Addams Family, and on overscheduling multiple airings of the same programming, to meet its licensing obligations.

A nationwide free preview period in March 2014 saw OUTtv achieve fully 300 per cent higher ratings than the same month in the previous year, and led to a rise in new subscriptions in the months following the preview.

=== Ronald N. Stern acquisition; expansion ===
In November 2016, the CRTC approved the sale of the channel from Shavick Entertainment and the other minority owners to a new company, OM Acquisition. OM is owned and controlled by Ronald N. Stern, who is also president of Stern Partners, a conglomerate whose other holdings include a share in the Winnipeg Free Press. It was revealed through CRTC filings that the new owners intend to purchase additional channels, including international channels, and launch an online streaming service.

Media reports revealed on January 11, 2017, noted that the agreement to purchase the channel closed in December 2016 and that the new owners of OUTtv would shift focus from the specialty channel to its streaming service, OUTtvGO, citing positive audience trends for adopting online television services and sagging cable subscription numbers. The television service was expected to close at a later date; however, the company revealed that the channel would remain on the air until at least 2020. The agreement was later modified to include minority owners James Shavick (18%), Bradley Danks (18%), Phillip Webb (11%), and other minority owners at 2%.

In June 2019, OUTtv and Bell Media announced that they had co-commissioned a Canadian version of RuPaul's Drag Race for the network and the Bell-owned Crave. Canada's Drag Race was announced to be airing on both services, first premiering on Crave on July 2, 2020. As part of the deal, OUTtv and Crave also share Canadian rights to the franchise, airing episodes of the U.S. and British version on their platforms day-and-date with their domestic premieres.

In recent years, the channel has reduced its reliance on acquired library programming and increased its investment in new original content. Initial Canadian-based productions included Cam Boy, Fak Yaass, Group Sext and Call Me Mother. In 2021, OUTtv unveiled a new logo to coincide with the launch of its streaming service in the United States on Apple TV. American co-produced shows included Jonny McGovern's talk show Hey Qween!, Ginger Minj's cooking show Wigs in a Blanket, and The Boulet Brothers' Dragula.

OUTtv's reality dating series For the Love of DILFS, hosted by Stormy Daniels, premiered on January 31, 2023, and received mainstream coverage. Following the success of the series, OUTtv announced a multi-year first-look deal with producer Daddy TV, including a second and third season. Expanding on its international complement, OUTtv acquired global SVOD rights to the BBC competition series Glow Up: Britain's Next Make-Up Star in 2024. The network went on to co-finance the show's sixth series and co-commission the seventh.

== Programming ==
OUTtv's programming consists of originally produced LGBTQ+ content (Sew Fierce, Dating Unlocked, Sugar Highs and Call Me Mother), as well domestic and foreign acquisitions.

Original American content that OUTtv produced in association includes For the Love of DILFS, X-Rated, The Sherry Vine Variety Show, Dr. Jackie, and Willam Belli's courtroom show Iconic Justice.

== International distribution ==
In mid-2006, OUTtv ventured into its first international market when it reached a deal with SelecTV to distribute the network on its lineup in Australia through a package called CurveTV. The package was poorly promoted and discontinued in early 2007 due to a low number of subscriptions.

OUTtv expanded to Europe on April 4, 2008, with the debut of a European version of OUTtv in the Netherlands through a licensing agreement with a newly formed Dutch company, OUTtv Media Group. The Dutch channel subsequently launched in several additional countries. The association between the two channels ended with the sale of OUTtv (Canadian TV channel) to OM Acquisition in 2016, and each channel now operates independently. OUTtv has since expanded on its own into the European market; in November 2020, it launched a direct-to-consumer SVOD streaming service known as FROOTtv in the United Kingdom and Ireland, which was rebranded to OUTflix in 2024 coinciding with distribution in Sweden, Norway, Denmark, and Finland via Allente.

OUTtv initially entered the streaming market in 2016 with the OUTtvGo app for iOS, Android and Roku devices in Canada, adding Apple TV devices in 2017. Direct-to-consumer (DTC) SVOD service from the OUTtv website launched to Canadian and United States subscribers in 2017; followed by Australia, New Zealand, Mexico, Brazil, Israel, Argentina and Taiwan.

OUTtv launched as an Apple TV channel in Canada in 2019, expanding to the United States in March 2021. That same year, Amazon Prime Video carried the LGBTQ+ channel in Canada and Australia, bringing it into the United States in May 2023. OUTtv debuted on The Roku Channel in the United States in June 2022, and subsequently joined Comcast Xfinity and Cox Communications as standalone SVOD channels. The LGBT+ streamer launched its OUTtv YouTube video subscription service in the United States on YouTube TV and YouTube Primetime Channels in April 2025.

In 2018, OUTtv expanded to New Zealand as a linear channel through a partnership with TVNZ on TVNZ's OnDemand platform. Prime Video added the OUTtv channel to its New Zealand service in November 2024.

OUTtv launched in South Africa as a month-long experimental pop-up channel, from October 4 to November 4, 2018, on MultiChoice's DStv platform. In June 2020, OUTtv signed a distribution deal with MultiChoice's streaming service Showmax. In March 2023, OUTtv partnered with OpenView HD to broadcast a full-scale linear channel in South Africa.

In November 2022, OUTtv announced the launch of a free ad-supported streaming (FAST) channel called OUTtv Proud, in partnership with Fuse Media. The channel first launched on Pluto TV in Canada in June 2023, and has since been picked up for distribution in the US on Pluto, Freevee, Xumo, Plex, Rewarded.tv and TCL. In 2024, OUTtv Proud became available in the United Kingdom on Channelbox, Netgem and Plex. OUTflix Proud became the first dedicated LGBTQ+ channel on the Freeview platform in the UK in June 2025.

As part of a planned expansion into Asian markets, a linear version of OUTtv debuted in Taiwan in March 2025 in partnership with Chunghwa Telecom on its CHT MOD platform.
