= List of drag kings =

This is a list of drag kings, sometimes known as male impersonators, drag performers, or drag artists. A drag king is a person who dresses in masculine clothes and hides their regular features (through such things as breast binding) for special occasions, often to perform, entertain, or engage in social activism. Many, but not all, drag kings are members of the LGBTQ+ community.

== Performers ==
Stage name	Name	Nationality	Notes
Adam All	Jen Powell	United Kingdom	
Alexander the Great		United States	
"Bert" Whitman	Alberta Whitman	United States	
Bessie Bonehill	Betsey Bonehill	United Kingdom	
Big D	Deanna Fleysher	United States	
Buck Wylde		United States	
Burlington Bertie	Ella Shields	United States	
Charles	Annie Hindle	England / United States	
Charles Galin King	Stephanie Galindo	United States	
Diane Torr	Diane Torr	Scotland	
Dick Von Dyke		United States	
Dirk Diggler	Deb Pearce	Canada	
Drag King Cole	Temi Wilkey	United Kingdom	
E. L. Brown	Lillyn Brown	United States	
Ella Wesner	Ella Wesner	United States	
Elvis Herselvis	Leigh Crow	United States	
Ethan Sword	Maximiliano Naturali	Chile	
Florence Hines	Florence Hines	United States	
Gladys Bentley	Gladys Bentley	United States	
Henlo Bullfrog	Joy Taney	United States	
HercuSleaze	Meags Fitzgerald	Canada	
Hetty King	Winifred Emms	England	
Hugo Grrrl	George Fowler	New Zealand	
Jake Savage	Camille O'Grady	United States	
Jarvis Hammer		United States	
Johnny Science	Johnny Science	United States	
Kathleen Clifford	Kathleen Clifford	United States	
Ken Pollet	Elena Ramírez	Spain	
King Molasses	Mo	United States / Nigeria	
King Perka $exxx		United States	
Landon Cider	Kristine Bellaluna	United States	
Lil’ Test Ease	Kemah Bob	United States	
LoUis CYfer	Lucy Jane Parkinson	United Kingdom	
Macha	Elizabeth Marrero	United States	
Majic Dyke		Kenya	
Marcus Massalami	Melisa Meseguer	Spain	
Minnie Tittell Brune	Minnie Tittell Brune	United States	
Murray Hill	Busby Murray Gallagher	United States	
Nico Elsker	Nicolás Otero	Spain	
Pepi Litman	Pesha Kahane	Austria	
Pressure K		United States	
Sexy Galexy	Karen Leigh Gillingham	Australia	
Stormé DeLarverie	Viva May Thomas	United States	
Silvio Di Baci		Australia	
Tenderoni	Janelle Felix	United States	
The Teenage Ho-Dads	Radio Sloan & Rachel Carns	United States	
Tuna Melt	Theo Pactong	United States	
Vesta Tilley	Matilda Alice Powles	England	
Vico Suave	Vico Ortiz	Puerto Rico	
Wang Newton	Mei-yin	United States / Taiwan	

== See also ==
- List of drag queens
- List of drag groups
- Lesburlesque
