= King of Drag Season 2 =

2026 season of King of Drag

King Of Drag
- Season 2
- Hosted by: Cameron Esposito
- Judges: Gottmik; Vico Suave; Guest judges
- No. of contestants: 8
- Winner: Lollygag
- Runner-up: Trade
- No. of episodes: 8

Release
- Original network: Revry
- Original release: September 20 – November 8, 2026

Season chronology
- ← Previous; Season 1

In February 2026, the second season of King of Drag was announced. On August 11, 2026, the cast for the season was revealed. It will premiere on Revry on September 20, 2026. Eight drag kings will compete for $10,000 courtesy of Revry, a one-year supply of e.l.f. Cosmetics and e.l.f. Skin, a custom suit, talent management, a headlining gig at the Emerald City Kings Ball in Seattle, and a crown and scepter.

It was announced that original host Murray Hill will not be returning to the show, and instead hosting duties will go to Cameron Esposito. Original judge Tenderoni was also announced to not be returning as a judge.

== Contestants ==
King of Drag contestants and their backgrounds (Note: All names, with hometowns, and outcome are stated at time of filming.)
Contestant	Hometown	Outcome
Lollygag	New York, New York	Winner
Trade	Des Moines, Iowa	Runner-up
D. Vour	Wichita, Kansas	3rd place
Cyrus K. Stratton	Philadelphia, Pennsylvania	4th place
Twinka Masala	Chicago, Illinois	4th place
Chase Lounge	Los Angeles, California	6th place
Papi Culo	San Antonio, Texas	7th place
VERA!	Oakland, California	8th place

== Contestant progress ==
Legend:

Lollygag won King of Drag Season 2.
Trade was the runner-up.
This contestant was eliminated in the finale.
WIN indicates that the contestant won the challenge.
TOP indicates that the contestant was one of the top kings for a challenge, but remained Safe.
SAFE indicates that the contestant was Safe for a challenge.
LOW indicates that the contestant was in the bottom, but did not have to compete in the Final Thrust.
BTM indicates that the contestant was in the bottom and competed in the Final Thrust.
ELIM indicates that the contestant was in the bottom and lost the Final Thrust, getting eliminated from the competition.
GUEST indicates that the contestant returned as a guest.

Contestant Placement in Each Episode
Contestant	Episode						
Contestant	1	2	3	4	5	7	8
Lollygag	WIN	TOP	SAFE	TOP	BTM	Guest	Winner
Trade	BTM	SAFE	TOP	WIN	TOP	Guest	Runner-Up
D. Vour	BTM	SAFE	LOW	TOP	WIN	Guest	Eliminated
Cyrus K. Stratton	LOW	LOW	WIN	BTM	ELIM		Guest
Twinka Masala	TOP	SAFE	BTM	LOW	ELIM	Guest	Guest
Chase Lounge	SAFE	BTM	SAFE	ELIM		Guest	Guest
Papi Culo	SAFE	WIN	ELIM			Guest	Guest
VERA!	TOP	ELIM				Guest	Guest

== Final thrusts ==
Legend:

The contestant was eliminated after their first time in the bottom.
The contestant was eliminated after their second time in the bottom.

Episode	Bottom Contestants			Challenge	Eliminated
2	Chase Lounge	vs.	VERA!	Inner Demons: Using UV Makeup, create a face over your current makeup	VERA!
3	Papi Culo	vs.	Twinka Masala	Mansplaining: Improvise a video on the given topic.	Papi Culo
4	Chase Lounge	vs.	Cyrus K. Stratton	Lipsync to Ride Me Cowboy by Paisley Fields	Chase Lounge
5	Cyrus K. Stratton vs. Lollygag vs. Twinka Masala			Persuade the Kings’ Court to join their Drag Kingdom.	Cyrus K. Stratton
5	Cyrus K. Stratton vs. Lollygag vs. Twinka Masala			Persuade the Kings’ Court to join their Drag Kingdom.	Twinka Masala
Episode	Final Contestants			Final Challenge	Winner
8	Lollygag	vs.	Trade	Perform in a final lip sync battle	Lollygag

== Guest judges ==
=== Episode 1 ===
- Dustin Lance Black, American screenwriter, director and producer

=== Episode 2 ===
- Yvie Oddly, American drag performer

=== Episode 3 ===
- Big D, contestant on King of Drag Season 1
- Dana Goldberg, American comedian

=== Episode 4 ===
- Frankie Simone, Actress
- Ginger Minj, American drag performer

=== Episode 5 ===
- Laith Ashley, Model and actor

=== Special Guests ===
==== Episode 1 ====
- Tuna Melt, contestant on King of Drag Season 1

==== Episode 3 ====
- Charles Galin King, contestant on King of Drag Season 1

==== Episode 5 ====
- Alexander the Great, contestant on King of Drag Season 1

==== Episode 6 ====
- Buck Wylde, contestant on King of Drag Season 1
- Pressure K, contestant on King of Drag Season 1

== Episodes ==
No.	Title	Original release date
1	"Hollywood!"	September 20, 2026
2	"Horror"	September 27, 2026
3	"Comedy"	October 4, 2026
4	"Country"	October 11, 2026
5	"Fantasy & Fairytales"	October 18, 2026
6	"Clip Show"	October 25, 2026
7	"Reunion"	November 1, 2026
8	"Finale"	November 8, 2026
