= Buck Wylde =

American drag performer

Buck Wylde, also known as Trigger Mortis, is a Latin American drag king. He is competing on the competition series King of Drag. Based in Dallas, Buck Wylde hosts Dallas' first and only drag king brunch in Deep Ellum, Sausage Party and also performs at Sue Ellen's. He received the Dallas Voice's Readers Voice Award for Best Drag King in 2024 and 2026.

== Personal life ==
Buck Wylde uses the pronouns he and they in drag.

== Filmography ==
- King of Drag (2025)
- King of Drag Season 2 (2026)

== See also ==
- List of drag kings
