= Drag show =

Drag king or drag queen performance show

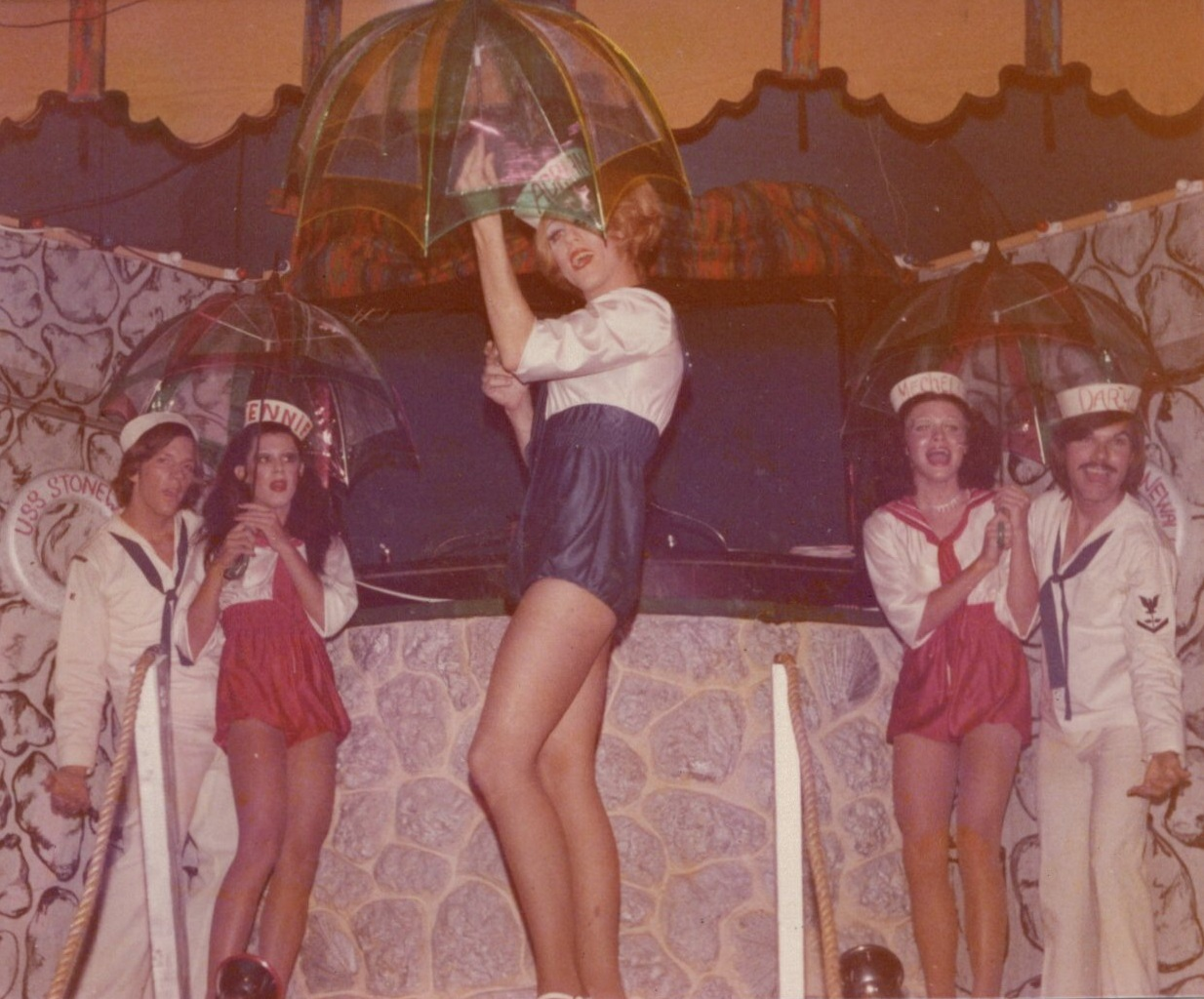
Drag show at the Stonewall Discotheque in Miami Beach, Florida, in 1972

A drag show is a form of entertainment performed by drag artists impersonating men or women, typically in a bar or nightclub as a burlesque-style, adult-themed nightclub event.

The modern drag show originated in the speakeasies and underground bars of 1920s and 1930s Prohibition America, in what was known as the Pansy Craze. Drag became a part of gay culture and a form of entertainment usually enjoyed by adults in bars.

Typically, a drag show involves performers singing or lip-synching to songs while performing a pre-planned pantomime or dancing. There might also be some comedy, skits, and audience interaction. The performers are often given cash tips by the audience members. The performers often don elaborate costumes and makeup, and sometimes dress to imitate various famous opposite sex singers or personalities. Young male dancers have often been included. Some other events are centered around drag-show type entertainment, such as Southern Decadence where the majority of festivities are led by the Grand Marshals, who traditionally are drag queens.

== History and development ==
=== Early existence ===
The first known drag balls in the United States were in Harlem in the 1920s, at the Rockland Palace. These shows featured extravagant performances of gays and lesbians impersonating the opposite sex and competing against one another in fashion shows. Harlem drag balls were primarily made up of people of color. White people were not excluded but did not typically participate. Drag balls were social events that brought people together who were on the margins of society and they often had to meet in secret.

During World War II, parody drag shows were also a regular kind of entertainment for soldiers who dressed up as humorous-looking women and put on shows for each other.

=== Jewel Box Revue ===
Doc Benner, and Danny Brown produced the show which started in Miami, Florida, at a gay bar known as Club Jewel Box. This show would go on to set the stage for the touring drag show known as the Jewel Box Revue. The Jewel Box Revue was the longest running drag show that performed from the 1940s until the 1970s across the United States. They had at least ten specific performances in their repertoire, which was helpful for shows that ran for longer periods of time at the same place. The show had their own music and dances that were composed and choreographed for performers, they also did comedy sketches and some stand-up performances. The revue was made up of a diverse group that included African Americans, Latinos, Native Americans, and whites, which was unusual for the times before the Civil Rights Movement.

From 1955 to 1969 the Master of Ceremonies and only drag king of the revue was biracial, butch lesbian Stormé DeLarverie, whose June, 1969 scuffle with police was, according to DeLarverie and many eyewitnesses, the spark that ignited the Stonewall uprising in New York City's Greenwich Village.

Many of the venues they performed at were part of the "chitlin' circuit", the Howard Theatre (Washington, D.C.), the Baltimore-Royal Theatre, Uptown Theatre (Philadelphia) and the Regal Theater in Chicago. In 1959 they began performing at The Apollo Theater in New York City and it was always a full house when they came to town.

In the 1960s laws and regulations were put in place against cross-dressing and the Jewel Box Revue slowed down a bit. Although places like Los Angeles had bans in place they were still allowed to play at certain theaters. Ultimately the laws and regulations against cross-dressing made it difficult for the Jewel Box Revue to perform.

In 1975, the Jewel Box Revue performed for the last time in a production at the Bijou Theater in New York City.

In 1987 Michelle Parkerson released the first cut of the movie, Stormé: The Lady of the Jewel Box, about DeLarverie and her time with the revue.

=== Pearl Box Revue ===
In 1955 the Pearl Box Revue began its performances in New York City. Pearl Box Revue was an all Black drag show that ran for twenty seven years until 1982. Dorian Corey was a performer in the Pearl Box Revue and also one of the drag queens in the documentary by Jennie Livingston known as Paris is Burning.

=== Disposable Boy Toys ===
Disposable Boy Toys (DBT) were a drag king group out of Santa Barbara, California. The group was started in May 2000 and had 31 members, mostly white, queer and transgender, and were a feminist collective. Their performances were centered on dismantling racism, sexism, gender binaries, ideal bodies and even militarism and they mostly performed in queer spaces or progressive spaces for fundraising and marches. Lip synching and dancing were regular components of their shows. DBT was known for performing at benefits to raise money for political and community causes.

DBT disbanded in August 2004, and although they did not officially break up they never performed together again.

=== After Dark ===
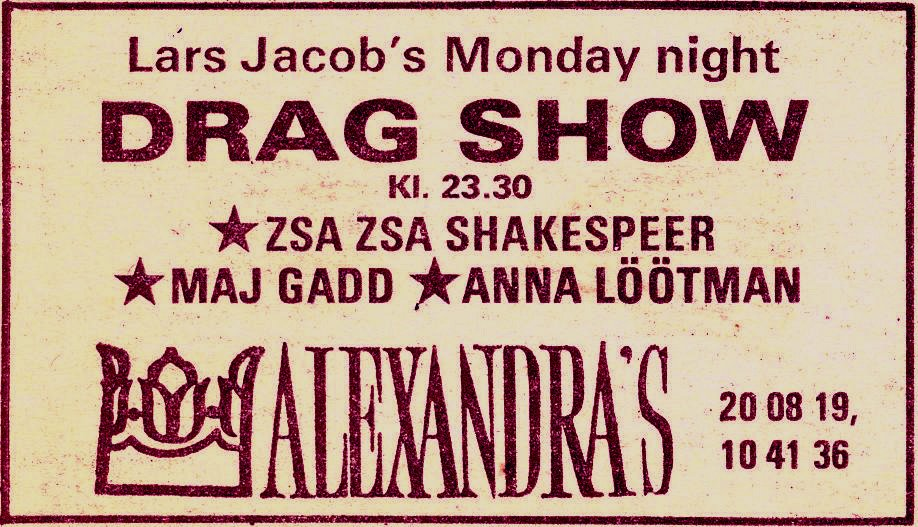
Swedish drag show ad from 1976

After Dark was a Swedish group founded in 1976 which performed for over 40 years, mostly in Sweden, but intermittently also in the United States and Spain.

=== Provincetown, Massachusetts ===
Provincetown, Massachusetts, is home to some of the most famous drag performers and in the summers months there are several performances on any given night. On July 24, 2018, Provincetown was home to the first ever Drag Camp, a camp for drag performers to hone their skills and perform for live audiences. The camp lasted for two weeks (until August 4, 2018) and showcased famous drag performers. Jinkx Monsoon, Peaches Christ, and Raja were some of the most famous drag performers who attended Drag Camp and had their own workshops sessions on how to apply makeup, or comedic performance, amongst many others. The drag performances in Provincetown, also known as Ptown, are legendary, hence why Drag Camp landed there.

=== Drag brunch ===
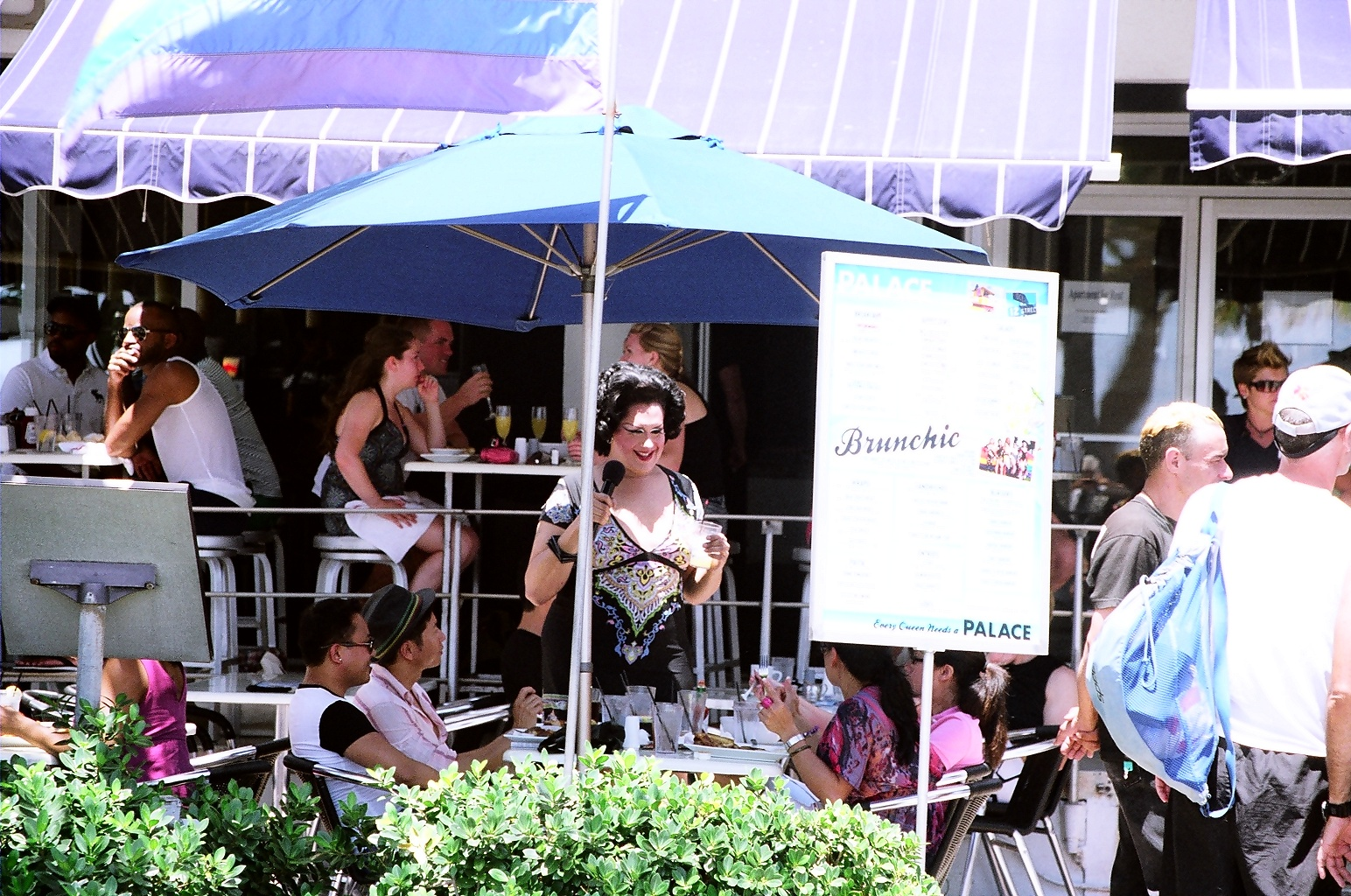
South Beach brunch and drag show during memorial weekend

A drag brunch is a type of drag show in which drag kings and drag queens perform for an audience while the audience is served typical brunch foods and drinks. The events feature dance, song and comedy performances.

Although typically held at LGBTQ bars and nightclubs, restaurants have also become a popular site for drag brunches. The practice is especially popular in urban centers with large gay populations, such as cities like New York City, Miami, Atlanta, Las Vegas, Quebec, and New Orleans. Drag historian and New York University professor, Joe E. Jeffreys, believes that the drag brunch's rise in popularity has been due to LGBTQ venues that arose between the 1950s and 1990s, such as Lucky Cheng's, Lips NYC, and Club 82. In an article titled "The Importance of Drag Brunch in NYC", Jefferys described how these venues have the ability to expose new audiences to drag performance. "[People] are able to sit at drag brunch and have a lovely spinach frittata and Bloody Mary while learning this lesson through observation. They start to understand that gender and drag aren't these scary things," said Jeffreys. "It's fun and festive like brunch can be."

Gospel-themed drag brunches have been staged across the United States. The drag venue Lips first started gospel drag brunches in Fort Lauderdale, Florida in 2007. Other places, such as San Antonio, Texas, have also seen a rise in gospel drag brunches. In addition to food, drinks, and the usual performances one would expect to see at a drag brunch, gospel drag brunches also feature performers in choir robes doing renditions of classic gospel songs.

== Popular culture ==
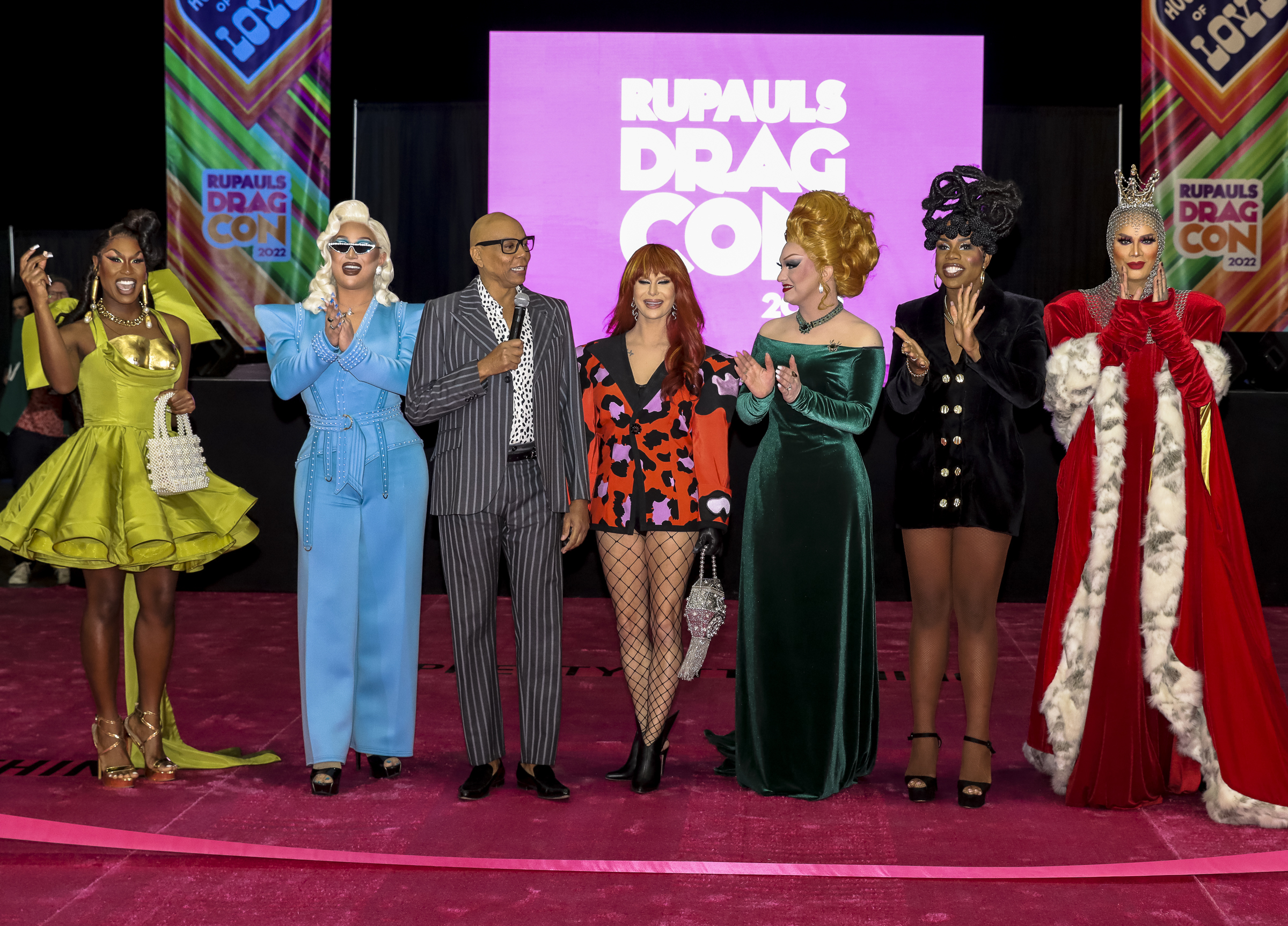
RuPaul with All Stars 7 Contestants at LA DragCon 2022 by dvsross

Drag shows have become more popular with the documentary Paris is Burning, and shows like RuPaul's Drag Race. Films such as The Birdcage and To Wong Fu, Thanks for Everything Julie Newmar have popularized drag culture too. These films along with RuPaul's Drag Race have a large heterosexual fanbase. Both the stage musical and film version of A Chorus Line reference drag shows, with the character of Paul relating his experiences as a performer with the touring company of the Jewel Box Revue.

== See also ==
- Drag panic
- Outline of transgender topics
- Wild Side Story
- LGBT theatre
