= King Molasses =

American drag king

- Born: Prince George's County, Maryland, U.S.
- Occupation: Drag king
- Years active: 2018–present
- Known for: Winner of King of Drag season 1
- Awards: Drag King of the Year (D.C. Drag Awards, 2025)

King Molasses is an American drag king who won the first season of King of Drag.

== Early life ==
King Molasses was raised in Prince George's County and is of Nigerian descent.

== Career ==
King Molasses has been performing since 2018. King Molasses was named Drag King of the Year by the D.C. Drag Awards in 2025.

== Personal life ==
King Molasses is non-binary and based in Washington, D.C.

== See also ==
- List of drag kings
- List of people from Washington, D.C.
