= Male impersonation =

Male impersonator or male impersonation may refer to:

- Cross-dressing
- Drag king
- Travesti (theatre)#Women in male roles
