= Nico Elsker =

Spanish entertainer

- Born: Nicolás Otero
- Occupations: Actor, drag king, and animator

Nico Elsker, known artistically as Nicolás Otero, is a Spanish drag king, performer, actor and animator.

== Early years ==
Nico studied textual interpretation at the Higher School of Dramatic Arts of Galicia.

== Career ==
He started his career in drag in 2014, working in the theatrical company Marinita y sus Maromas. Nico started to act as a drag king during his gender transition as a trans man.

After his experience in the theater, he started to act in local cabaret shows and musicals in Galicia, collaborating with Vigan transformist Cristian de Samil. Although it started in 2014, Nico says that at the time there was no visibility whatsoever about drag king culture in Spain, which is why he initially carried out his activities without local references.

In 2018 he competed in the contest Noite Drag (night drag), organized by Nós mesmas, a group in Vigo focused on the struggle of lesbian, bisexual and trans women. A year later, he acted in Pontevedra in the drag show "Marikas x la fiesta".

On 14 July 2022, he acted in the theater DT Espacio Escénico in Madrid as part of the show 'Cabaret Drag King', alongside the artists Chile Güero, Hapi Hapi, Toñito Man Xao, Marcus Massalami and Aytor Menta. In August of the same year, he presented the play Contos invertidos in the Gorrilla Theater.

Since 2022, Elsker is part of the organization of the Drag King Gala of Vigo, a pioneer in Spain in this area.

== Personal life ==
Elsker is a transgender man.
