= Wang Newton =

Taiwanese drag king

Wang Newton (born Mei-yin) is a professional drag king and Asian LGBT figure whilst running "Wang TV" on YouTube. They were featured in a 2021 New York Times article by Frank DeCaro profiling notable American drag kings. Performing since 2004, "Dr. Wang" is one of the few full-time drag king performers with an international profile. Their name is a reference to Las Vegas singer Wayne Newton.

== Early life ==
Wang was born in Taiwan but grew up in midwest America, mostly in central Pennsylvania. In the era before RuPaul's Drag Race aired in 2009, Wang started to explore their masculinity and first performed as a drag king at friends' parties. Their debut was on Halloween night in Philadelphia in 2004.

== Career ==
Wang does shows internationally most notably in Taiwan, Berlin, Los Angeles and New York City. Starting in 2020, Wang Newton co-produced an online monthly performance series called Sacred Wounds featuring Asian drag artists. In December 2020, Wang Newton participated in an advocacy campaign called #DragForAllFlavors that was organized by PepsiCo sparkling water brand bubly and the LGBTQ+ elder services organization SAGE.

In 2025, Wang was one of the permanent judges on the King of Drag competition show that aired on Revry.

Wang is represented by the leading Diversity and LGBTQ+ talent agency, LTA INC (Luxe Talent Agency, Inc).
