= Genres Pluriels =

Belgian non-governmental organisation

- Formation: 16 October 2007; 19 years ago
- Legal status: NGO
- Headquarters: Brussels, Belgium
- Location: Brussels, Belgium
- Region served: Wallonia
- Official language: French
- Leader: Max Nisol

Genres pluriels (GP) is a Belgian NGO founded in 2007 by Max Nisol, Londé Ngosso and Tanguy Pinxteren to promote the visibility of gender fluid, trans and intersex persons.

== History ==
At the end of 2006 Max Nisol created Les Drag Kings de Bruxelles (DKB) to organize drag king monthly workshops. During his time working with DKB, Nisol became aware of the lack of information on the subject of transidentity, and decided to create an association with the aim of providing useful information to persons affected by the issue. Nisol, along with Londé Ngosso and Tanguy Pinxteren, founded the association Genres Pluriels on 16 October 2007. Their website is available in English, French, and Dutch, and is hosted by Domaine Public [archive], a Belgian association in favor of open source software.

The DKB became independent in 2012, and continues to organize drag king events and performances. Their drag king workshops often include discussions about gender identity and gender performance.

In 2016, Genres Pluriels experienced a financial crisis, and thee members of the staff were made redundant for lack of finances.

In December 2017 the Institute for the Equality of Women and Men chose Genres Pluriels to participate on a team of equal opportunity representatives to commemorate the 15 year anniversary of the institute.

In 2017, Héloïse Guimin-Fati became a co-leader as well.

== Main objectives ==
Genres Pluriels serves as an advocacy group for transgender, gender fluid, and intersex persons. The association organizes different activities in Brussels and Wallonia in order to counter discrimination against trans, intersex and gender fluid persons. The websites provides articles offering a critical feminist analysis of medical, social and psychological practices, as well as of biology and the way it is taught.

The association claims to be part of the feminist queer movement and works in collaboration with LGBTQI and feminist associations. It adheres to the Jogjakarta Principles. The association is also in favor of gender neutral language to counter discrimination.

The aims of Genres Pluriels include eliminating trans-identities from the list of mental illnesses; eliminating forced psychiatric treatment for transgender, gender fluid, and intersex people; allowing people to change their first name, regardless of gender, for free and on demand for all documents; excluding the mention of gender on official documents; offering asylum to all trans people, gender fluid people, and intersex people from countries where they would be in danger; allowing transgender, gender fluid, and intersex people the right to have biological children or adopt children, and to allow intersex people the right to choose their sex and gender
