= Gabriel Baur =

Swiss film director

Gabriel Baur, also known as Gabrielle Baur, is a Swiss freelance film director and author, living in Switzerland, Lisbon and New York.

== Life and career ==
Gabriel Baur came to film through visual arts, acting and cultural anthropology. After her Master of Arts degree from the University of Zurich, she finished film school at New York University in 1983. In-depth study of directing and screenwriting with Wojciech Marczewski (PL), Krzysztof Kieslowski (PL) and Frank Daniel (USA), among others.

Films as director and screenplay writer (selection): Glow, Venus Boyz, Die Bettkönigin, Cada día historia, Die Ausnahme und die Regel, One To Zero, A Tale. Venus Boyz is the first documentary feature film on drag kings and female-to-male transgender persons. Her films have been screened at national and international festivals and in cinemas and have won numerous awards such as Berlin International Film Festival, Chicago International Film Festival and Locarno International Film Festival (Venus Boyz)

In 1983 she co-founded Onix Filmproduktion together with Kurt Mäder and was a lecturer at the Zurich University of the Arts from 2003 until 2010. From 2010 to 2014 she was Vice President of the Federation of European Film Directors FERA and since 2018 Co-President of Swiss Women's Audiovisual Network SWAN. SWAN is a Network committed to more gender equality and diversity in the film industry. Gabriel Baur is also a member of the Swiss Film Academy and the European Film Academy EFA.

== Filmography ==
- Glow (2017)
- Venus Boyz (2001)
- Die Bettkönigin (1994)
- Die Ausnahme und die Regel (1992)
- Cada día historia (1986)
- A Tale (1984)
