= Ken Pollet =

Ken Pollet, the stage name of Elena Ramírez (Málaga, b. 1992), is a Spanish drag king and philosopher. He is one of the most recognized drag kings in Barcelona.

== Career ==
Ken Pollet made his debut in 2018 in Room 3 of the Apolo venue in Barcelona, marking the beginning of his artistic career. For Elena, drag king performances became a way to embrace his identity and masculinity, which had been strongly repressed during childhood.

In 2019, he founded the collective Queer That, a boy band that parodies heteronormativity in their performances.

Since 2019, he has organized workshops, debates, and interviews, and has produced shows aimed at promoting drag king culture in Spain. Among the most notable is KINGS: Drag King Anti-Race, a recurring show that has held four editions since its inception. The latest edition featured international artists appearing in Spain for the first time, including Mo B. Dick, Bridge Markland, Buba Sababa, Alexander Cameltoe, Nancy, and Papi Pistola.

Pollet cites numerous queer artists, primarily from the Spanish and Chilean scenes, as influences on his artistic development and performative activism.

In 2022, he collaborated with director and producer Erika Lust to create a film based on his drag king workshops.

Pollet has given several interviews across radio, web, and television. In 2023, he appeared on the Catalan television program Plaça Tísner, where he promoted the International Drag Kings Revolution event, which he organized.
