= El Daña =

American drag king

- El Dana performing
- Born: Elsie Saldaña; October 15, 1944 (age 82); Riverside, California, US
- Known for: Oldest drag king in the world
- Children: 1

Elsie Saldaña, better known by her stage name El Daña (born October 15, 1944), is an American drag king and LGBTQ+ activist. She has been an active drag king in the Central Valley since her first stage performance in 1965, and gained national attention after being featured in StoryCorps. She was named the oldest active king queen in the world by the Guinness World Records. She was included in the Out100 list of influential LGBTQ+ celebrities in 2025.

== Biography ==
Elsie Saldaña was born on October 15, 1944, into a family of farmworkers in Riverside, California, who were part of the Bracero Program. She was the oldest of seven, and soon after her family moved to Fresno when she was five, she began helping her family out by picking figs, cotton, and grapes. She knew she was attracted to girls from a young age, and began doing impersonations mimicking her brothers.

In 1965, Saldaña auditioned and stepped onto the stage of one of the few gay bars at the time in Fresno, Red Robin, as a drag king, or as she called it a "male impersonator", without ever having seen a drag king herself; she performed La Bamba. Despite suffering from stage fright, she performed well enough to be guaranteed a weekly show by the owner. She was also the only "male impersonator" in the area. She hid her drag outfits from her mother in paper bags during her early performances, knowing she would not approve. Since her first year of performing as a drag king, she has prayed before every show she performs.

Saldaña went on to spend the next four decades as an active drag king, performing on weekends while working in a factory during weekdays. Her crooner specialty and Tom Jones imitation impressed audiences enough that they threw bras at her. In the 1970s, her partner at the time had a son named Mark, who became her son as well, even though the relationship with her partner deteriorated.

Saldaña co-founded the Sequoia Empire of Visalia and Tulare, a branch of the charitable and social LGBTQ+ organization known as the Imperial Court System, in Visalia, California in 1980. She assumed the Emperor's title three times, and raised thousands of dollars for charities during that time. She also visited individuals who were with hospitalised with AIDS. During that same time, she took the name El Daña, which she would come to be known as for the rest of her career.

Saldaña retired from drag for a decade after Mark died at 29, and also left Fresno, due to a combination of struggling to make ends meet even with her job at a factory and grief over her loss. However, she returned to drag in 2017 when Kat Fobear, a professor at California State University, Fresno, invited her to speak at a class. She also returned to Fresno, and began working as a house cleaner. She was interviewed on the NPR podcast StoryCorps in 2020, which led to her receiving national attention. In 2022, she organized a drag fundraiser for Fresno State's LGBTQ+ studies minor.

In 2024, Saldaña received the Harvey Milk Award from Anna Caballero. This award honors contributions towards LGBTQ+ equality made by individuals. She was also featured on the NPR podcast Code Switch that same year. In 2025, she was officially named the oldest active drag king in the world by the Guinness World Records. She was also named to the Out 100, a list of the most influential LGBTQ+ people in the nation, in 2025, where she was called a "drag legend". Her work has been placed in the archives of California State University, Fresno. Since gaining media attention, she has spoken about what she views as drag kings being "sidelined", stating that they receive little recognition and less money than drag queens.

As of 2025, she still works as a house cleaner to earn a living as her social security check is insufficient to support her. She has also commented about the low number of bookings she receives despite the acclaim, resulting in GO magazine telling its audience to "give back to a queer elder" by booking her. She resides in Clovis, California, as of 2026.
