= Tenderoni (drag king) =

American entertainer

- Born: Janelle Felix
- Occupation: Drag king
- Known for: Winner of Drag Queen of the Year Pageant (2021); judge on King of Drag
- Style: 80s and 90s pop-inspired
- Television: King of Drag
- Awards: Alaska Thunderfuck's Drag Queen of the Year (2021)

Tenderoni is the stage name of Janelle Felix, an American drag king. He won Alaska Thunderfuck's Drag Queen of the Year Pageant in 2021. He is a judge on the American television series King of Drag. He is based in Chicago.

According to Queerty, Tenderoni "brings a unique blend of old-school cool and modern flair to the stage". He has described his drag as "a mash-up of Michael Jackson, Bobby Brown, Prince, George Michael, and Boy George".

Tenderoni performed in the Taco Bell Drag Brunch tour.

== Filmography ==
- King of Drag (2025)

== See also ==
- List of drag kings
- List of people from Chicago
