= King of Drag =

American reality television series

- Season 1
- Hosted by: Murray Hill
- Judges: Sasha Velour; Tenderoni; Guest judges
- No. of contestants: 10
- Winner: King Molasses
- Runner-up: Dick Von Dyke
- No. of episodes: 6

Release
- Original network: Revry
- Original release: June 22 – July 27, 2025

Season chronology
- Next → Season 2

King of Drag is a drag reality competition series that premiered in June 2025 on American LGBTQ+ streaming service Revry. The series is hosted by drag king Murray Hill and is the first drag competition series to feature solely drag kings. Them named it one of "The 10 Best LGBTQ+ TV Shows of 2025."

== Background ==
While reality competition series based on drag artists first gained prominence following the premiere of RuPaul's Drag Race in 2009, it was not until 2018 with the New Zealand series House of Drag for a drag king to appear on a drag competition series. Hugo Grrrl, who appeared on the first season of House of Drag, was the first drag king to compete and to win a drag competition series. The following year the third season of The Boulet Brothers' Dragula marked the first American drag competition series to feature a king, with Landon Cider going on to win the season.

King of Drag was announced in 2024 and is the first drag competition series to feature a cast solely made up of drag kings.

== Production ==
The series was announced in December 2024 and premiered on Revry on May 18, 2025. It features ten American drag kings; Alexander the Great, Big D, Buck Wylde, Charles Galin King, Dick Von Dyke, Henlo Bullfrog, King Molasses, Perka Sexxx, Pressure K and Tuna Melt, competing over six episodes for the title of King of Drag. American comedian and drag king Murray Hill is the host of the series, with Hill previously hosting the drag cooking competition Drag Me to Dinner in 2023.

Casting for the series opened in 2024 and closed on January 5, 2025. The casting is open to "individuals of all ages, ethnicities, gender identities, and styles of drag," including trans masc, cisgender women, non-binary and more."

Judges include: Gottmik, Sasha Velour, Tenderoni, Wang Newton, Kylie Sonique Love, Landon Cider, Jackie Beat, Carmen Carrera, Cole Escola, Paul Feig, Bridget Everett, Jeff Hiller, Lisa Rinna, Liv Hewson, Kathleen Hanna and Revry co-founder Damian Pelliccione.

== Contestants ==
King of Drag contestants and their backgrounds (Note: All names, with hometowns, and outcome are stated at time of filming.)
Contestant	Hometown	Outcome
King Molasses	Washington D.C.	Winner
Dick Von Dyke	Minneapolis, Minnesota	Runner-up
Henlo Bullfrog	Philadelphia, Pennsylvania	3rd place
Big D	Bellingham, Washington	4th place
King Perka $exxx	Charlotte, North Carolina	5th place
Charles Galin King	Los Angeles, California	6th place
Alexander the Great	Austin, Texas	7th place
Pressure K	Atlanta, Georgia	8th place
Buck Wylde	Dallas, Texas	9th place
Tuna Melt	New York, New York	10th place

== Contestant progress ==
Legend:

King Molasses won King of Drag Season 1.
Dick Von Dyke was the runner-up.
This contestant was eliminated in the finale.
WIN indicates that the contestant won the challenge.
TOP indicates that the contestant was one of the top kings for a challenge, but remained Safe.
SAFE indicates that the contestant was Safe for a challenge.
LOW indicates that the contestant was in the bottom, but did not have to compete in the Final Thrust.
BTM indicates that the contestant was in the bottom and competed in the Final Thrust.
ELIM indicates that the contestant was in the bottom and lost the Final Thrust, getting eliminated from the competition.
GUEST indicates that the contestant returned as a guest.

Contestant Placement in Each Episode
Contestant	Episode					
Contestant	1	2	3	4	5	6
King Molasses	WIN	WIN	TOP	BTM	BTM	Winner
Dick Von Dyke	SAFE	TOP	SAFE	SAFE	WIN	Runner-Up
Henlo Bullfrog	BTM	SAFE	SAFE	WIN	TOP	Eliminated
Big D	TOP	TOP	LOW	TOP	ELIM	Guest
King Perka $exxx	LOW	BTM	WIN	LOW	ELIM	Guest
Charles Galin King	SAFE	SAFE	BTM	ELIM		Guest
Alexander The Great	TOP	LOW	ELIM			Guest
Pressure K	SAFE	SAFE	ELIM			Guest
Buck Wylde	SAFE	ELIM				Guest
Tuna Melt	ELIM					Guest

== Final thrusts ==
Legend:

The contestant was eliminated after their first time in the bottom.
The contestant was eliminated after their second time in the bottom.

Episode	Bottom Contestants			Challenge	Eliminated
1	Henlo Bullfrog	vs.	Tuna Melt	Breakdancing	Tuna Melt
2	Buck Wylde	vs.	King Perka $exxx	Stand-up Comedy	Buck Wylde
3	Alexander The Great vs. Charles Galin King vs Pressure K			Film a death scene in the style of a found footage horror movie	Alexander The Great
3	Alexander The Great vs. Charles Galin King vs Pressure K			Film a death scene in the style of a found footage horror movie	Pressure K
4	Charles Galin King	vs.	King Molasses	Choreograph an original cheer routine	Charles Galin King
5	Big D vs. King Molasses vs. King Perka $exxx			Interpretive dance	Big D
5	Big D vs. King Molasses vs. King Perka $exxx			Interpretive dance	King Perka $exxx
Episode	Final Contestants			Final Challenge	Winner
6	Dick Von Dyke	vs.	King Molasses	Perform in a final lip sync battle	King Molasses

== Guest judges ==
Listed in alphabetical order:

- Aubrey Shea, actor and singer
- Brian Michael Smith, actor
- Bridget Everett, actress and singer
- Cameron Esposito, actress and comedian
- Carmen Carrera, actress, and model
- Cole Escola, comedian, actor and singer
- Gottmik, makeup artist and drag queen
- Jackie Beat, drag artist
- Jeff Hiller, actor
- Kathleen Hanna, musician and activist
- Kylie Sonique Love, drag queen
- Landon Cider, drag king, actor and host
- Layshia Clarendon, basketball player
- Lisa Rinna, actress
- Liv Hewson, actor
- Mo B. Dick, drag king, executive director of dragkinghistory.com
- Paul Feig, filmmaker
- Vico Ortiz, actor

== Episodes ==
No.	Title	Original release date
1	"Battle of the Boy Bands"	June 22, 2025
Weenie Challenge: Sports trading card-themed photoshoot Weenie Challenge Judges: Tenderoni and Layshia Clarendon; Weenie Challenge Winners: Charles Galin King and King Molasses; Weenie Challenge Prize: $150 Prideletics Gift Card and selecting their groups as the team captains Beefy Challenge: Create and perform together in your own boy band show Kings' Court: Wang Newton, Tenderoni, Sasha Velour, Damian Pelliccione, and Paul Feig; Beefy Challenge Winner: King Molasses Bottom Two: Henlo Bullfrog and Tuna Melt; The Final Thrust: Breakdancing Eliminated: Tuna Melt
2	"The Dong Show"	June 29, 2025
Weenie Challenge: Mansplaining randomly selected complex topics in teams of three Weenie Challenge Judge: Jeff Hiller; Weenie Challenge Winners: Alexander the Great, Buck Wylde, and Henlo Bullfrog; Weenie Challenge Prize: $100 RodeoH shopping spree Beefy Challenge: "The Dong Show" - King of Drag's celebrity impersonation talent show Kings' Court: Tenderoni, Sasha Velour, Wang Newton, Jeff Hiller, and Bridget Everett; Beefy Challenge Winner: King Molasses Bottom Two: Buck Wylde and King Perka $exxx The Final Thrust: Stand-up Comedy Eliminated: Buck Wylde
3	"Horror"	July 6, 2025
Weenie Challenge: Beau and the Beast: Makeup looks that are half glamor, half monster Weenie Challenge Judge: Sasha Velour; Weenie Challenge Winner: King Perka $exxx Weenie Challenge Prize: Ultimate crown and contour by e.l.f. cosmetics Beefy Challenge: Dress and perform as your greatest fear Kings' Court: Tenderoni, Sasha Velour, Liv Hewson, Vico Ortiz, and Landon Cider; Beefy Challenge Winner: King Perka $exxx Bottom Three: Alexander the Great, Pressure K, and Charles Galin King; The Final Thrust: The Blair Butch Project: Film a death scene in the style of a found footage horror movie Eliminated: Alexander the Great and Pressure K
4	"Prom Night"	July 13, 2025
Weenie Challenge: Drag King History: Answer first in teams and then individually to win. Weenie Challenge Judge: Mo B. Dick; Weenie Challenge Winner: Charles Galin King; Weenie Challenge Prize: $150 Good Vibes shopping spree, a drag king tea taster box courtesy of Callisto Tea House, $150 Pals Socks gift card, and a box of No. 2 pencils Beefy Challenge: Serve the best look under the theme "Nautical Night" and create and memorize a 1-minute speech to recite on stage Kings' Court: Tenderoni, Sasha Velour, Carmen Carrera, Brian Michael Smith, and Jackie Beat; Beefy Challenge Winner: Henlo Bullfrog Bottom Two: Charles Galin King and King Molasses; The Final Thrust: Choreograph an original cheer Eliminated: Charles Galin King
5	"A Song for the King"	July 20, 2025
Weenie Challenge: Rock star makeover: style a wig and give an air guitar performance. Weenie Challenge Winner: Henlo Bullfrog; Weenie Challenge Prize: $400 Levi's shopping spree, and the Jumbo Power Grip Primer, Halo Glow Liquid, Powder, Highlighter, and Contour Filter, and Glow Reviver Lip Oil, courtesy of e.l.f. cosmetics; everyone else also earned an $175 Levi's gift card and an assortment of e.l.f. cosmetics and skincare Beefy Challenge: DIY a look from unconventional materials from Remainders Creative Reuse and choreograph a lip sync performance to ARXX's "Good Boy"; Kings' Court: Tenderoni, Gottmik, Aubrey Shea, Cameron Esposito, and Kathleen Hanna; Beefy Challenge Winner: Dick Von Dyke Bottom Three: Big D, King Molasses, and King Perka $exxx The Final Thrust: Interpretive dance Eliminated: Big D and King Perka $exxx
6	"Showbiz"	July 27, 2025
Beefy Challenge: Best Drag Performance: three minutes to perform. Eliminated: Henlo Bullfrog Final Battle: Perform in a final lip sync battle to the King of Drag theme song, "KING", by Frankie Simone. Kings' Court: Tenderoni, Gottmik, Cole Escola (Beefy Challenge only), Lisa Rinna (Final Battle only), Kylie Sonique Love, and Damian Pelliccione. Season 1 Winner: King Molasses Season 1 Runner Up: Dick Von Dyke
