= Johnny Science =

American activist, make-up artist, musician and drag king

- Born: January 13, 1955; Englewood, New Jersey, U.S.
- Died: December 14, 2007 (aged 52)
- Other names: John Grant, Johnny Armstrong, Daniel Austen
- Occupations: Make-up artist; activist; musician; drag king
- Known for: Transgender activism

Johnny Science (January 13, 1955 – December 14, 2007) was an American activist, make-up artist, musician, and drag king known for his work on behalf of drag kings, kink, trans men, and gay men. Through the 1980s and 90s, Science hosted drag king workshops and formed what is believed to be the first FTM meetup group in New York City, F2M Fraternity. He has been called "the unsung hero of female-to-male consciousness raising" in New York City.

== Early life ==
Science grew up in Englewood, New Jersey. He was assigned female at birth and began using cork makeup to playact in male drag when he was three or four years old. His parents were generally supportive of these artistic pursuits. He found inspiration in the work of makeup artist and actor Lon Chaney as a child. Some of his early drag efforts involved attempts to look like an older man so that he could go places that children couldn't typically go.

Between 1977 and 1980, Science attended Farleigh Dickenson University and studied gender and transsexuality. In the early 1980s, prior to his transition, Johnny Science played as "Suzy Science" in the band Science. Science was one of the house bands at the famed punk venue, Max's Kansas City and also regularly played at Women's One World (W.O.W.) café in the East Village. Johnny Science also art directed for Max's Kansas City at this time. He was involved in the lesbian S&M scene, and was a leader in the Lesbian Sex Mafia prior to his transition. In the mid-1980s, Science began engaging in performance art at local sex dungeons like the Belle de Jour and swinger's clubs like Plato's Retreat. These shows often included him dressing up in hypermasculine archetypes (such as a biker) and using prosthetics to have sex with his partner at the time. He also at times employed dramatic elements such as chain saws and fake blood. Science's song "Twistco" was featured on the album Max's Kansas City - 1976 & Beyond (Expanded).

Johnny Science began to seek medical gender transition in 1986. However, he claimed in 1989 that he had "lived totally as a man for far longer than that. At this point in time, there were no community resource groups for trans men in New York City. He began corresponding with other trans men in the United States, such as Lou Sullivan, the founder of FTM International, Mario Martino, author of one of the first autobiographies on the trans male experience, and Rupert Raj, founder of Foundation for the Advancement of Canadian Transsexuals. Around this time, Science also befriended the porn star and sex educator Annie Sprinkle. He adopted the name Johnny Science, though at various points in his life he also answered to Johnny Armstrong, Charles John Austen, Johnny A, Daniel Austen, and John Grant.

== Drag king and FTM activism ==
In May 1988, Science went on Howard Stern's television show to attempt to get the word out about transsexual men's issues. One year later, in March 1989, Science formed a meetup group for "FTM transsexuals, crossdressers, and their friends" called F2M Fraternity. F2M Fraternity had an accompanying limited-run newsletter called "Rites of Passage" and regularly distributed information about medical transition, advertised local drag king events, and hosted video nights highlighting how trans men were being portrayed on television. "Rites of Passage" was published out of Tenafly, New Jersey. The events were initially hosted in Kit Rachlin's apartment but moved to Annie Sprinkle's apartment not long after F2M Fraternity's inception. Science's activism frequently was financially burdensome; in one piece of advertising from September 1990 he wrote, "I have been without a phone for 6 months after running up huge bills, calling T/S's, C/D's, and professionals all over the world!"

Sprinkle met Les Nichols, a trans man on testosterone who had recently had phalloplasty, at one of the F2M Fraternity meetings in 1989 and decided to film a pornographic documentary about a sexual experience between the two of them called "Linda/Les and Annie: the First Female-to-Male Transsexual Love Story." Under the name Johnny Armstrong, Science wrote and sang music for the film and had some involvement in directing and editing the film as well. The film was released in 1990 and had a very mixed reaction from some in the transgender community due to some of the outdated language and attitudes Sprinkle displayed regarding Nichols' body and pre-transition life. "Linda/Les and Annie: the First Female-to-Male Transsexual Love Story" was the first sexually explicit transmasculine film ever made.

Science began teaching drag king workshops in 1989, which consisted of teaching people assigned female at birth how to present themselves as male via makeup and clothing. He also provided information about phalloplasty in early meetings. These were hosted in Annie Sprinkle's apartment, later dubbed the "Annie Sprinkle Transformation Salon." During this time, Science sometimes went by John Grant and Johnny Armstrong. In 1990, Diane Torr attended one of these workshops and noticed that there seemed to be no movement or vocal training. They began collaborating on the workshops together, which often included taking their participants out into spaces like parks and strip clubs to see if they "passed" as male to the people around them. Science taught these workshops all across America, and taught several internationally as well. According to Diane Torr, "We were then both determined to get the phrase “drag king” and the concept behind that - the idea of male impersonation by a female - included in common parlance." Science insisted he had come up with the term drag king during his lifetime.

Throughout the 90s, Johnny Science promoted Linda/Les and Annie and did drag king makeup for kings who appeared on The Joan Rivers Show, The Phil Donahue Show, Jerry Springer, The Montel Williams Show, and Geraldo in order to promote visibility for trans men, drag kings, and female to male cross dressers. In the late 90s he founded The Drag King Club, which was a social group for women who cross-dressed. Science also aired a weekly cable television show "That Show! With Johnny Science" (also called Drag King Club with Johnny Science) on Manhattan Neighborhood Network community access television. This show interviewed all of the leading drag kings of the day, talked about art and culture, and showed makeup transformations onscreen. According to Kit Rachlin in Science's obituary, the show ran until 1998 but an article in the New York Times from January 2000 reported that it was still airing on channel 57.

In May 1992, Johnny Science organized a Drag King Ball at the Crow Bar, which included a drag king contest. Any type of drag was permitted, including drag that did not emphasize passing as male. The drag king contest was the first of its kind outside of the ballroom culture scene. Science ensured that this would be reported on extensively on by the New York press. He hosted a second event that November at the Enterprise Theater but could not drum up the same interest from the press a second time. After this, Johnny became a less active member of the scene. According to Kit Rachlin, "If Johnny had stayed in the scene, I think that it would have become a legendary event. Instead it kind of just got erased." By the mid-90s, Dianne Torr was running the Drag King Workshops on her own.

== Gay activism and later years ==
Some time in the late 1990s or early 2000s, Johnny Science chose to go "stealth" - that is, to pull away from FTM activism and blend in with the cisgender gay male community. His friends regularly told him of the goings-on in the trans community, and he expressed sadness over feeling like he could not both participate and be accepted as a man by wider society. Science found a new home in gay kink communities, becoming both a member of the Gay Male S&M Activists and the Metro NY Chapter president of the National Leather Association.

In the mid-1990s, Science founded The Jovian Gentlemen, a social club for older men and younger men who wanted to date each other. Many events hosted by The Jovian Gentlemen were kinky play parties. Science preserved hundreds of documents, videos, sound files, and other ephemera pertaining to his and other peoples' LGBTQ activism in both print and digital form in his home.

Johnny Science was in ill health for the last ten years of his life. He died of heart failure in 2007 and was given an extensive obituary in issue #114 of Transgender Tapestry. The ephemera he preserved were donated to New York University after he died. In 2019, some ephemera collected by Johnny Science was displayed at NYU's Bobst Library in an exhibition entitled "Violet Holdings: LGBTQ+ Highlights from the NYU Special Collections."

== Filmography ==
Year	Title	Role	Notes
1989	Linda/Les and Annie: the First Female-to Male Transsexual Love Story	Director and Producer	as "Johnny Armstrong"
1991	My Father is Coming	Restaurant Manager	as "Charles John Austen"

== See also ==
- FTM International
- Annie Sprinkle
- Diane Torr
- Gendernauts
- National Leather Association
