= Majic Dyke =

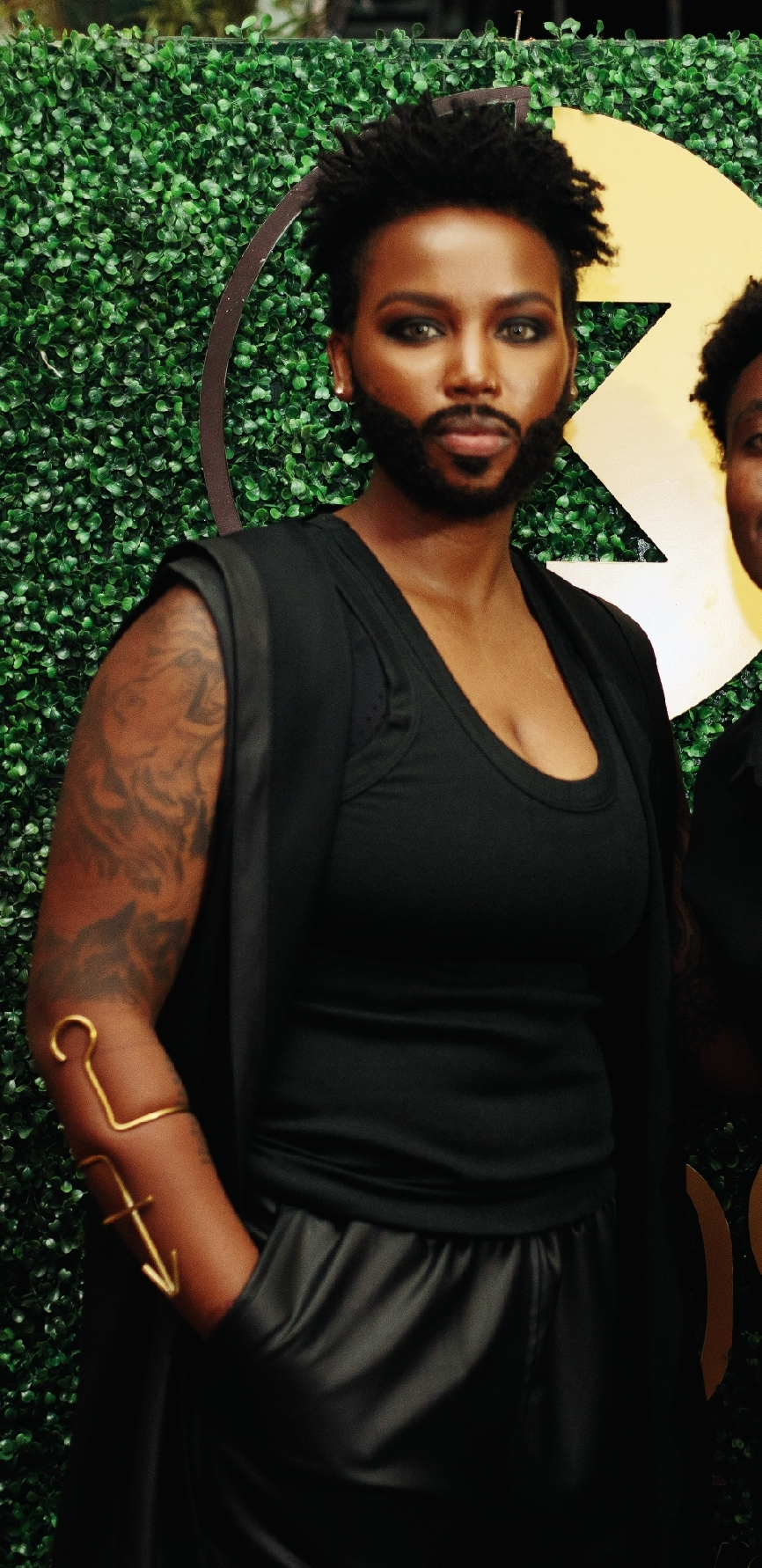
- Born: Nairobi, Kenya
- Citizenship: Kenya, US
- Occupations: Activist, drag king
- Years active: 2017–present
- Notable work: Life with Majic

Majic Dyke is gender-bending, Black Queer African drag king, activist and podcaster from Kenya.

== Early and personal life ==
Majic was born and raised in Nairobi, Kenya but emigrated to Washington D.C., United States at a young age.

Majic identifies as non-binary, and their pronouns are (they/them). They were married to the singer and The Spread podcast creator, Karen “Kaz” Lucas.

== Drag performance ==
Majic joined the Washington D.C. based drag king troupe, Pretty Boi Drag in 2017. Their drag name Majic Dyke comes from the male stripper movie Magic Mike and is a play on the eponymous character's name. They have co-curated spaces that center Black joy, like Unforgivable Blackness, an all-Black variety show, and performing with Strapped in Canada and the Cocoa Butter Club AfterDark Special XXX in London. In 2020, Majic was crowned Washington D.C.’s Best Drag King. They describe drag as a ‘vehicle for expression helping them to live a life full of love and positivity.’

== Activism ==
Majic is an advocate for LGBTQ+ rights in Kenya and has collaborated with grassroots organizations to raise funds, provide shelter, and program build. They have facilitated workshops on gender equity and sexuality, as well as offered mentorship and coaching for upcoming drag artists through the Kings of Kenya & Drag Academy.

They launched the Life with Majic podcast in 2020. The podcast dissects a range of topics including grief, pleasure, spirituality, activism and white privilege.
