= Ethan Sword =

Chilean art director, cosplayer and drag king

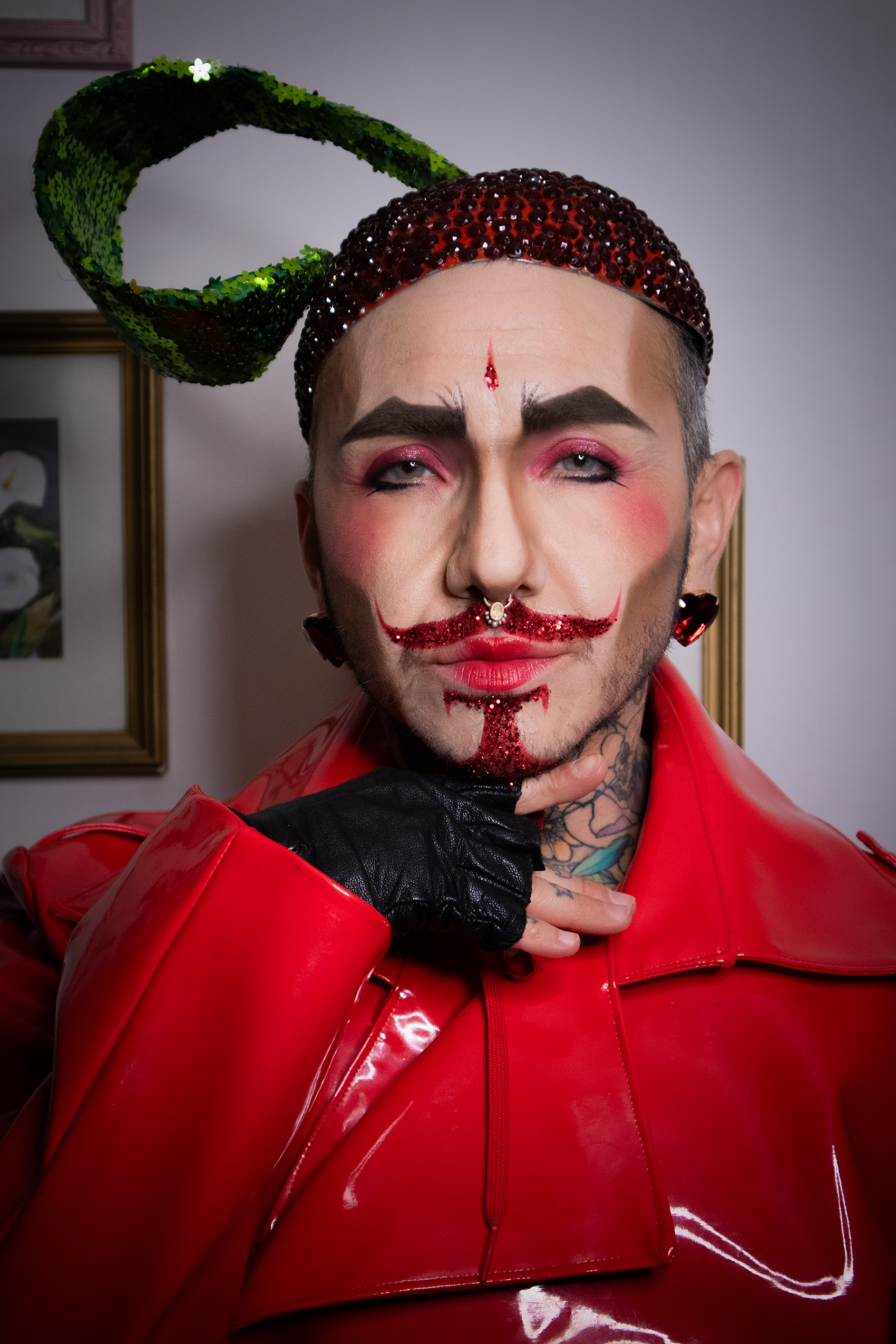
- Born: Maximiliano Naturali; August 22, 1981 (age 44); Santiago, Chile
- Occupations: Drag king, designer, and cosplayer

Maximiliano Naturali (born 22 August 1981 in Santiago), better known as Ethan Sword, is a Chilean director of art, designer, cosplayer and drag king. He is considered one of the most recognizable drag kings in the country.

== Early years ==
Ethan grew up in La Pintana in Santiago, Chile, where he lived with his mother and grandmother, since his parents separated very early. Although Ethan developed a relationship with his mother, she died when Ethan was just 15 years old.

== Career ==
Ethan started his artistic career as a cosplayer and began as a drag king in March 2018. A short time later, he joined the group Show Kings Colectivo. The same year, he performed as the opening act for Sasha Velour, winner of season 9 of RuPaul's Drag Race.

In 2020 he was a guest on the podcast Cerveza con Papas to talk about the art of drag in Chile and its history.

On 3 July 2023 he introduced the pride parade to the Medical College of Chile, 50 years after the first LGBT demonstration in the country.

== Personal life ==
Ethan identifies as transmasculine.
