= Murray Hill (performer) =

American comedian (born c. 1971)

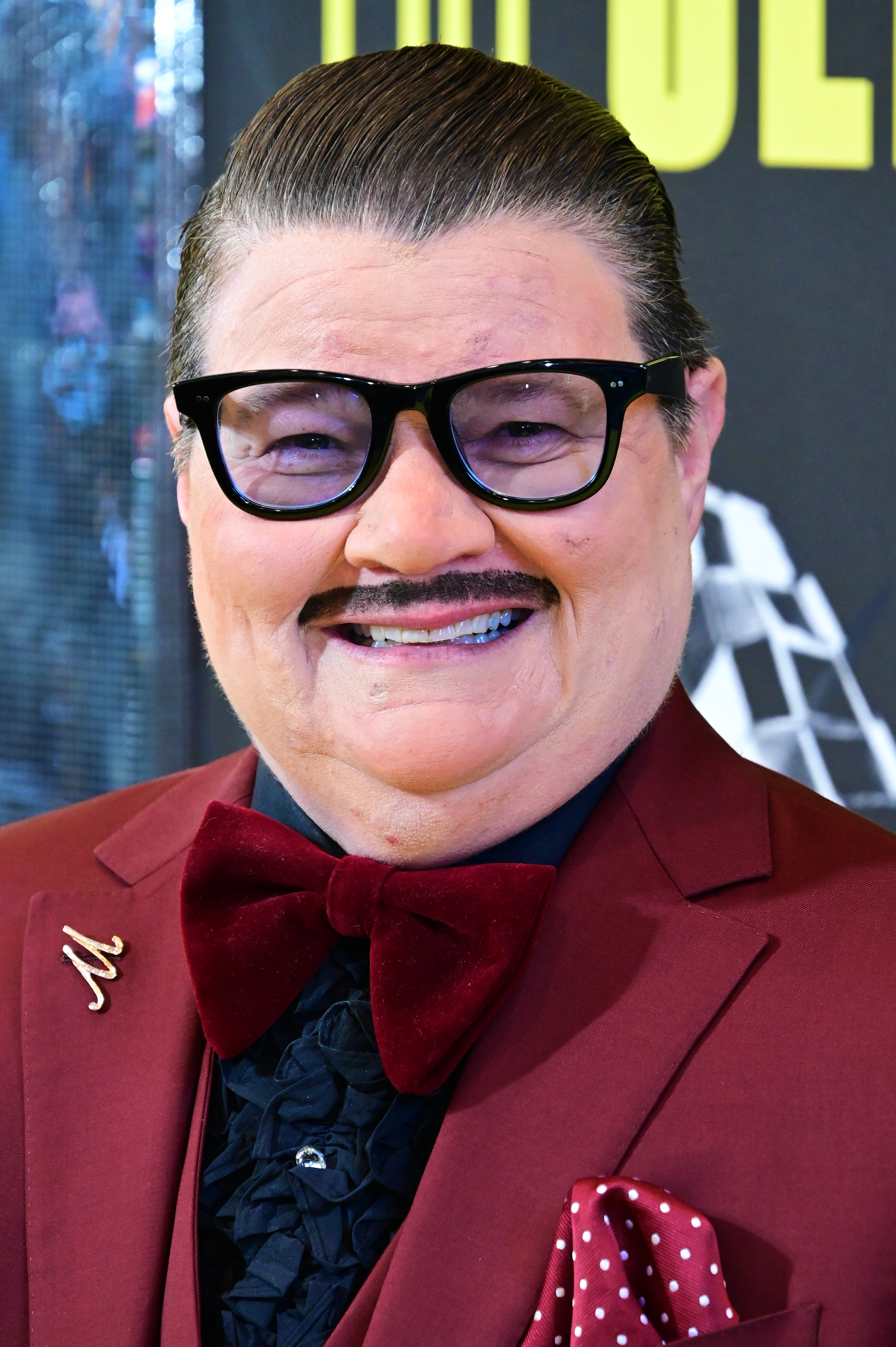
- Hill in 2026
- Born: October 25, 1971 (age 55)
- Other name: Busby Murray Gallagher

Murray Hill (born 25 November 1971) is a New York City based American comedian, drag king, actor, television host, and entertainer. He is the entertainer persona of Busby Murray Gallagher, although this persona is maintained even in private settings. Murray Hill is the self-proclaimed "hardest-working middle-aged man in show business."

== Early life, family and education ==
Hill was born in Massachusetts and was raised by religious, conservative parents in Connecticut, New England. He is half-Italian and half-Irish. He grew up being a "full-blown tomboy" and was socially ostracized for presenting as butch. "I always looked like a boy, and I always thought I was a boy," he recalled, "There weren't any problems in my head, it was everybody else that had a problem." His immediate family made it clear that he was "not a girl the way [he] needed to be a girl." They encouraged him to wear a dress and do his hair a certain way to appear more feminine; for Hill, "getting a lot of heat at home" and out in the world was challenging to navigate. "My personality and the way I interacted with people was my saving grace. I made people laugh. I was funny. And that was my way of connecting with people. And it was also my way of disarming people," he said.

While in pre-kindergarten, Hill was cast in a school play with other girls as a cornstalk. He wanted to be Bingo, the farmer, but was told that he couldn't because it was "a boy's role." Nevertheless, he persisted, and was finally given the part.

During his first couple of years at school, Hill felt "more comfortable" hanging out with boys at lunch and on the playground. However, once he reached second grade, he was encouraged to sit with the girls which "did not make sense" to him. "I wasn't even out yet as a kid. I didn't come out until college. But I was still ostracized and made fun of. I was pretty ignorant to it, but I knew that it was bad from the religious part of my upbringing," he said. Most people assumed that he was "a boy in many ways," but the teachers and administrators were confused about how he presented in class and "what was listed on the attendance sheet." He was eventually enrolled in a "special program" to make his voice sound "more feminine."

Hill's "first conscious awareness of drag" took place in seventh grade after he watched The Queen (1968) in a media studies class. "I can't even describe the experience," he said, "I'd never seen anything like it! There was such joy and happiness and chosen family." The films introduced him to the concept of chosen family. "I could see [...] that these outcasts and misfits were the star of their own show. They were their own parents, they were their own sisters, they were their own brothers, they were their own daddies," he added.

High school marked Hill's first tryst with drag, after he started dressing up as masculine subjects for his book reports. For the opposite sex day, he showed up as Schneider from One Day at a Time (1975–84) sporting a mustache and tool belt. Hill also gravitated to the arts, specifically photography, and left his "rigid and constricting household" after graduation to study photography at Boston University.

== Career ==
=== 1990–95: Exposure to Boston's cabaret scene and conception of the drag king persona ===
While studying photography at Boston University in the early-1990s, Hill, still closeted, started frequenting drag clubs. He impersonated as a Boston Phoenix employee, carrying his documentary camera, and serving as a behind-the-scenes photographer for city's nightlife and cabaret scene. "I was just absorbing this whole culture," Hill told Today in an interview, "I loved the community aspect of it. Life sucked on the outside but in these gay clubs, it was fun. It was joyous. It was campy, and I loved camp. People took care of each other. So over time, I realized that I was enjoying and loving this entire environment. But still, I didn't see anyone represented like myself." During this time, he photographed New York drag big-wigs including Lypsinka, Girlina and Lady Bunny.

After moving to New York City to pursue a graduate degree in photography and media at the School of Visual Arts, Hill attended the Wigstock festival. While watching Lady Bunny perform, he noticed that "everybody was taking pictures of drag queens" and "everyone was dressed in drag" but there were very few trans people and lesbians in attendance. Surrounded predominantly by gay men and drag queens, he began to wonder about "the other side of the spectrum." He later discovered a meatpacking district "hot spot" called the Hershey Bar that hosted a lesbian night with a drag king pageant. He snuck in, pretending to be a photographer from The Village Voice weekly newspaper, and was first exposed to drag kings but found them to be too "serious and heavy, steeped in masculinity." He felt that the "goal for masculine drag was to try to pass as a man; nobody smiled or laughed." Hill longed for "the same camp and humour" that he had seen drag queens use in their performances, coupled with the "toughness of kings."

=== 1996–98: NYC mayoral candidacy and success as a drag performer ===
Hill started making appearances at drag clubs in 1996, while still enrolled in his Master of Fine Arts (MFA) program and working a day job as a visual artist. His graduate thesis in 1997 featured monochrome portraits of himself dressed as a candidate running for the New York City mayor against Rudy Giuliani on the "drag king ticket." The project later transformed into an actual mayoral write-in candidacy for which Hill adopted a "Let the kids dance!" platform in response to Giuliani's anti-cabaret stance and the broader "quality of life" campaign. He canvassed on the Midwest streets while performing at underground clubs and received 334 votes.

In his early career as a drag king, Hill hosted gigs as a "cigarette guy" and then as a "fat Elvis impersonator" at Club Casanova in East Village. He hadn't settled on a name yet, but he lived in Manhattan's Murray Hill neighbourhood at the time, and saw the phrase "everywhere around him." Eventually, he went with Busby Murray Gallagher and began to further develop his drag persona as the "comedian, entertainer, and shtick slinger." Busby was a callback to Buzz, Hill's gender-ambiguous nickname in college.

Inspired by the Catskills-Borscht Belt comedians from the 1950s, 60s, and 70s, such as Don Rickles, Shecky Greene, and Shelley Berman, Hill's drag alter-ego sported "pinky rings and plaid jackets, slicked back hair with loads of campy bravado and lounge-y flair." He embodied the "old-fashioned showman spirit" of Joey Adams, Benny Hill, Sammy Davis Jr. and Henny Youngman. Initially, he disliked being called a drag king because he presented as Murray Hill both in and out of drag. He was "resolutely dedicated to his persona" and would refuse to share his dead name with the reporters believing that it would be "bad for him personally and professionally."

By 1998, Hill was co-hosting a Flamingo East party called 99999's with performer Penny Tuesdae. He also stepped in as the "offstage booster, mediator and father confessor" for various "avant-garde performers" like the acrobatic comedy-burlesque act Wau Wau Sisters. He was the opening act for the American rock band Le Tigre and The Gossip. He frequently served as a cameo performer in music videos, including the Scissor Sisters's Filthy/Gorgeous (2005), and Hedwig and the Angry Inch directed by John Cameron Mitchell. Celebrity sightings–Alan Cumming, John Waters, Fran Drescher, and Boy George–at his shows were common. He was invited to perform at parties thrown by Joan Rivers, Liza Minnelli and Ivana Trump.

=== 1999–2006: The Murray Hill Show and success as a performer ===
Between 1999 and 2006, he independently hosted The Murray Hill Show at the now-defunct Fez at Lafayette Street, Mo' Pitkins House of Satisfaction, and The Zipper Factory. For his annual Christmas show in 2004, a sold-out nine-night gig, Hill performed "Murray on Ice" during which two "Murrayettes" dressed as sexy reindeers strapped rollerblades to his feet. He then skated through Fez to Flashdance in his suit and Santa Hat "manically hurtling between tables." The same year, he performed two New Year's Eve sets of his show, one at Galapagos in Williamsburg, Brooklyn and other at Florent in the meatpacking district. On stage, he introduced himself as the principal of The Breakfast Club (1985) and gathered "a motley crew" of "a rich girl, a preppie, a nerd, a leather-clad man in the spirit of Judd Nelson, burlesque performer Dirty Martini, district's drag-empress Florent dressed as Nancy Reagan" from the audience. He then assembled the crew into an "impromptu kickline" to lead a "rousing bar-wide singalong" to New York, New York.

Hill later confirmed that a television pilot of the show, "like a cross between the Muppet Show, Dean Martin Show and the early Jackie Gleason shows," had been in the pipeline with independent producers. Channel representatives from Showtime and Comedy Central amongst others had dropped by "for as long as anyone can remember" but nothing was released.

In 2000, Hill founded and began hosting the annual Ms. Lez pageant to recognize "the most fabulous lesbian, transgendered, or otherwise queer woman in New York City." He also started emcee-ing for theatre, burlesque, and entertainment events, including The Village Voice's Siren Festival (2002), Marc Jacobs "infamous" holiday parties, Paper Magazine's dinner for Pedro Almodovar (2006), Bust's 15th anniversary party at The Speigeltent (2008), recurring bingo nights with drag queen Linda Simpson, and his annual Oscar's party at Joe's Pub. During this time, he met and befriended many Gay Gotham luminaries, including Justin Vivian Bond and Joan Rivers, as well as cabaret performer Bridget Everett who cast him in Somebody Somewhere (2022) two decades later.

In 2006, Hill hosted The Immodest Tease Show (T.I.T.S.), a burlesque-focused benefit to support the Burlesque Hall of Fame, with Julie Atlas Muz and Dirty Martini at London's Bloomsbury Ballroom. Produced by Andrew Sutton, the event also featured Immodesty Blaize, Fancy Chance, Sugar Kane, Foxy Tann and the Wham Bam Thank You Ma’ams, and Steve Clark (of The Clark Brothers). The ensemble performed for more than 2,000 people for two nights. He has been hosting the New York Burlesque Festival and Burlesque-A-Pades at The Birchmere, Virginia since the early 2000s.

=== 2007-present: Television appearances and collaboration with Dita Von Teese ===
Hill had a string of cameos in Shortbus (2006), Gravity (2010), Bored to Death (2010), Taxicab Confessions (1995–2006) and BRAVO's Real Housewives of New York City season 4 (2011). He also appeared in music videos of TV on the Radio's No Future Shock (2011) with Michael Musto and What I Gotta Do from Bridget Everett's debut album Pound (2013).

Hill co-created and starred in This is Burlesque, an Off-off-Broadway show, with Angie Pontani in 2008; the show ran for two years between.

After watching him perform at a burlesque show with the Pontani sisters in SoHo, Manhattan, Dita Von Teese's manager approached Hill to recruit him as the opening act for her tour. She had been struggling to find someone who was professional, respectful towards women and "could adapt to different audiences." He was hired after a trial run in Seattle, and toured with Von Teese for the next ten years. He hosted ten live shows of Von Teese's Strip Strip Hooray! at Roxy on Sunset Strip, Los Angeles in 2011 and spent the next summer touring with her across Live Nation's House of Blues venues.

Hill toured with Luann de Lesseps in 2019.He appeared in the comedy-drama Life & Beth (2022–2024) and hosted the 2023 Hulu comedy competition Drag Me to Dinner. He was part of the main cast of Somebody Somewhere (2022– 2024).

In December 2024, Hill was announced as the host of an upcoming drag reality competition series King of Drag. The show premiered in June 2025 on Revry and is the first drag competition series focusing specifically on drag kings. Hill was replaced as host of the second season by Cameron Esposito.

== Legacy and image ==
During a time when drag queens "reigned supreme" and drag kings did not enjoy similar notoriety, Hill became widely regarded as a "New York institution" and "an indelible figure of New York nightlife." The Seattle Weekly recognized him as a "pioneer" of drag kings. In 2005, The New York Times called him "the reigning patriarch of the downtown performance community" for moving "seamlessly from old time-y clubs like the Plush Room in San Francisco (known for lounge acts like Patti Lupone's) to an East Village spot where nearly naked men dance on the bar." Truscott of the Wau Wau Sisters likened Murray to the "middle of the wheel holding all these different spokes together."

In The Encyclopedia of Lesbian and Gay Histories and Cultures (1999), Jack Halberstam praised Hill for "transforming masculinity and exposing its theatricality with profound results".

== Personal life ==
Hill is transgender. He has previously mentioned that he hasn't and doesn't want to pursue gender-affirming care. He married Michelle Cathey-Casino on 20 December 2025 at Lincoln Center in New York City.

In November 2021, on his 50th birthday, Hill lost his Williamsburg, Brooklyn apartment of more than 20 years in a fire. A GoFundMe, benefiting Hill and some of his neighbours, was launched shortly after and raised more than $100,000.

== Filmography ==
Film
Year	Title	Role	Notes
2010	Dirty Martini and the New Burlesque	Himself	Documentary
2024	Jackpot!	Johnny Grand	Cast
2026	The Man with the Bag		Cast; Post-production

Television
Year	Title	Role	Notes
2010	Bored to Death	Himself	1 episode
2011	Real Housewives of New York	Himself	1 episode
2022	Life & Beth	Murray	Recurring; season 1
2022–2024	Somebody Somewhere	Fred Rococo	Main cast
2023	Drag Me to Dinner	Himself	Host
2025	King of Drag	Himself	Host
2025	Elsbeth	Henry	1 episode

== Awards and nominations ==
Year	Award	Category	Nominee(s)	Result	Ref.
2022	Peabody Awards	Entertainment	Somebody Somewhere	Nominated	
2025	Queerty Awards	Trailblazer	Himself	Won	

== Gallery ==
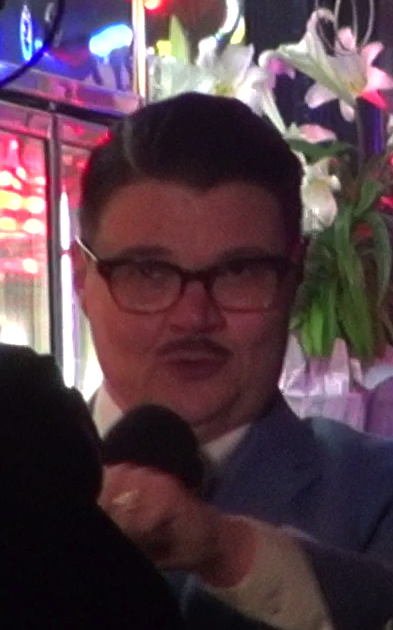
Hill doing a story in the East Village of Lower Manhattan

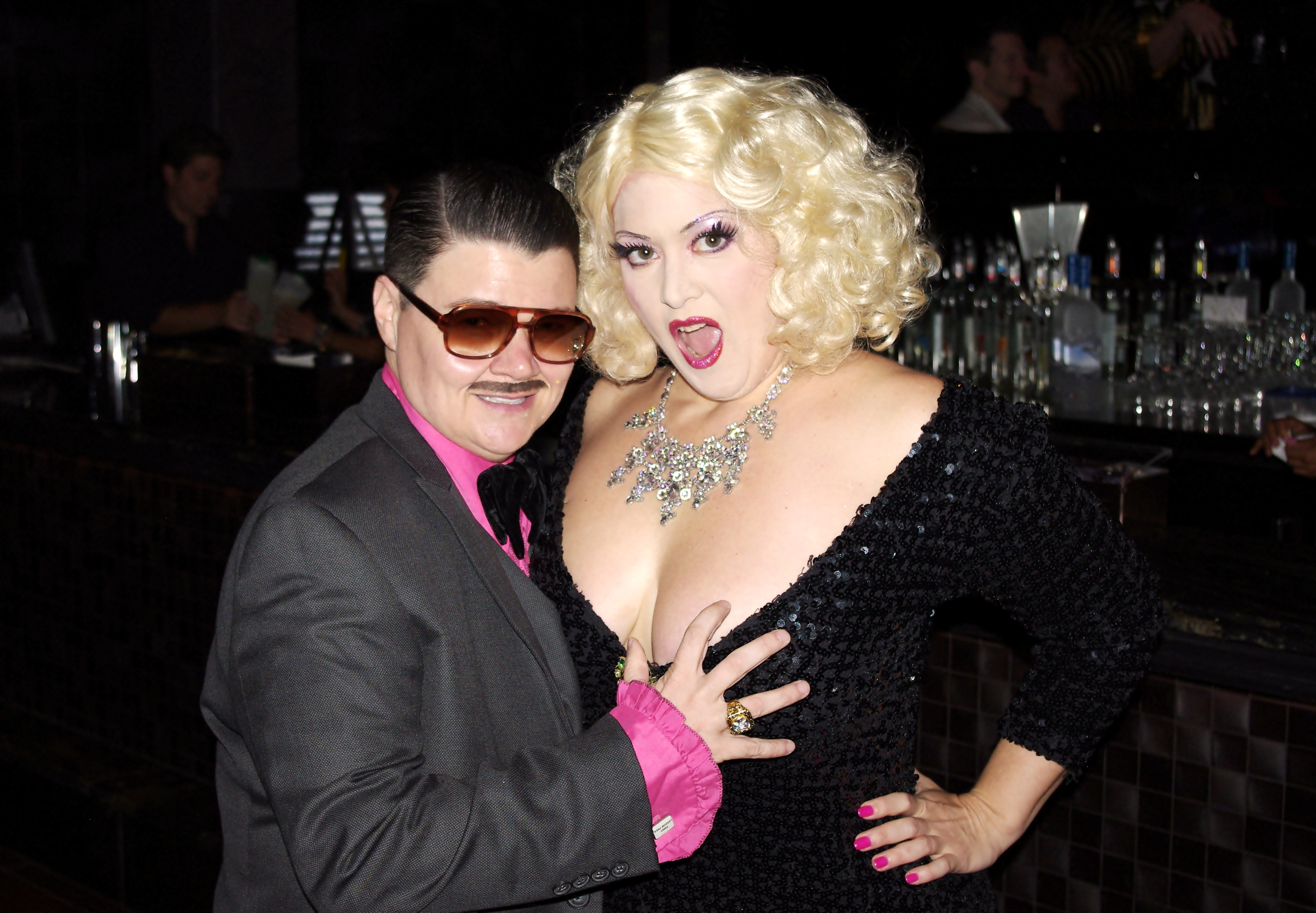
Hill with frequent collaborator Miss Dirty Martini at the Copacabana in 2011

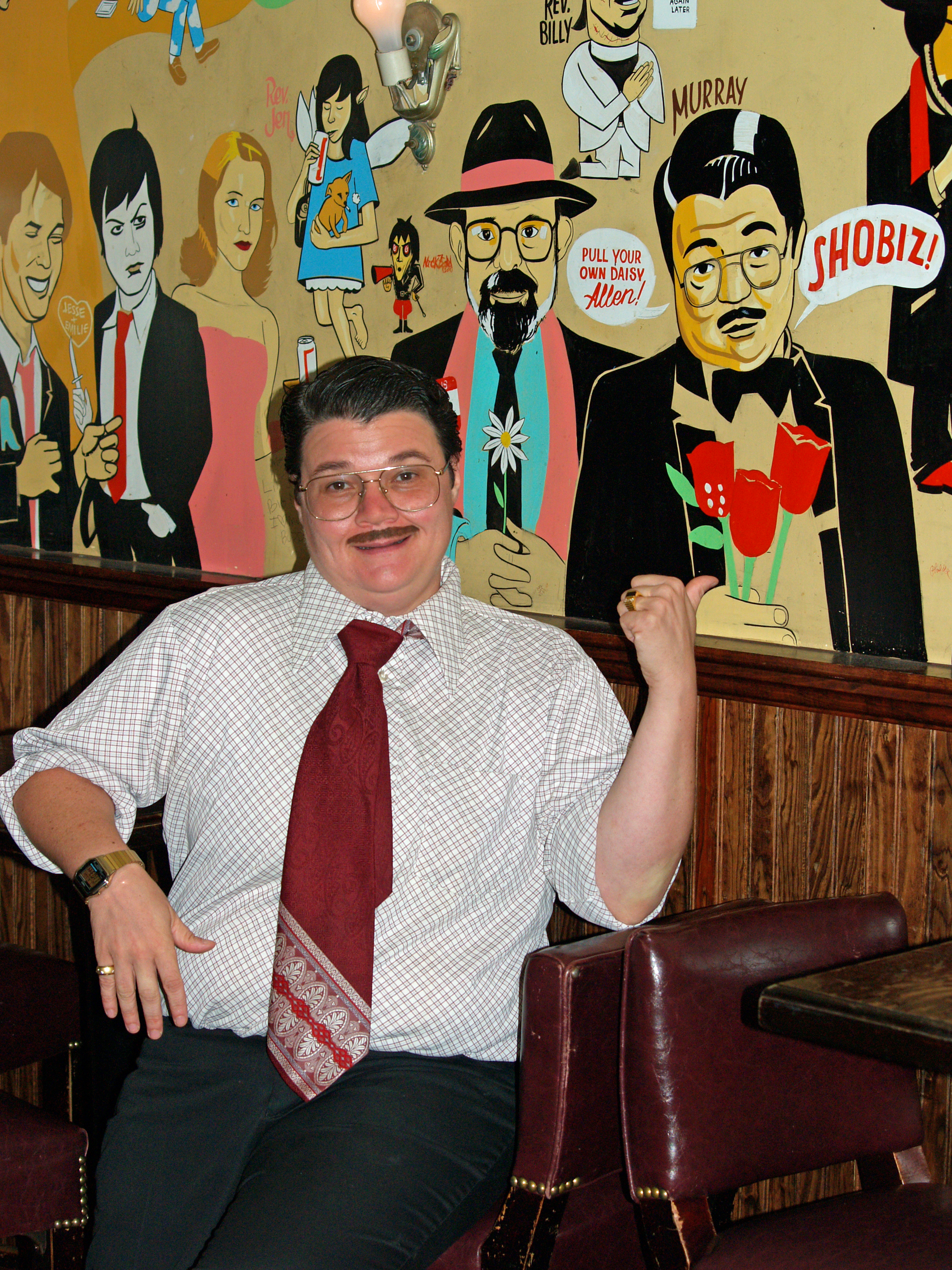
Murray Hill in 2007, during his last show at Mo Pitkins' House of Satisfaction in the East Village

== See also ==
- Drag culture in New York City
- LGBTQ culture in New York City
- List of LGBTQ people in New York City
