= Diane Torr =

Canadian artist and drag king (1948–2017)

Diane Marian Torr
- Born: 10 November 1948; Peterborough, Ontario, Canada
- Died: 31 May 2017 (aged 68); Glasgow, Scotland
- Education: Dartington College of Arts; Bard College
- Known for: Performance art, Drag King, gender performance

Diane Marian Torr (10 November 1948 – 31 May 2017) was a performance artist, drag king, dance educator, and teacher of "Man for a Day" and gender-as-performance workshops. Torr was active in the Downtown Arts Scene in New York City. For the last years of her life, Torr lived and worked in Glasgow, where she was Visiting Lecturer at Glasgow School of Art.

== Biography ==
Diane Torr was born in Peterborough, Ontario, but grew up in Aberdeen, Scotland and later attended Dartington College of Arts, England, where she studied with dance luminaries Mary Fulkerson and Steve Paxton, art pioneer Paul Oliver, and theatre innovators, Peter Hulton and Peter Feldman (of the Open Theatre). She graduated in 1976 and arrived in New York that same year. Her first dance performances in New York (Egyptian Stock; Half-Lives of Plutonium; World Shift; Wind Fertilization) were in downtown loft spaces in 1978. Torr took class at the Cunningham Studios, and began her practice of the Japanese martial art of Aikido at New York Aikikai in 1977 and in 2003 achieved the rank of sandan (3rd degree blackbelt). Torr received her MFA degree from Bard College in New York in 2004.

From the onset of her career in the late 1970s, Torr was a leading figure in creating performance art that challenges contemporary edicts and perceptions of gender and sexuality. With her drag king workshops, which she began teaching in 1990 in New York, with artist Johnny Science, Torr was a pivotal force in the establishment of drag king culture in the US, Europe, Istanbul and New Delhi. In collaboration with performance artist, Bridge Markland, Torr co-directed the highly successful "godrag!" Festival (2002) in Berlin - a one-month-long festival of women performing masculinity, femininity, androgyny and drag.

Torr's performances are a radical synthesis of dance, film (original and archival footage), installation, spoken word, invented soundtracks, and borrowings from other sources such as magic tricks, and secret society signals. Her rich performance palette has resulted in an unusual body of work that continues to influence and inspire new generations of independent artists. Her performance "Donald Does Dusty" explores her brother's (who died of AIDS in 1992) performance of Dusty Springfield. "(Un)Popular Heroines" transfers to performance the written works of surrealist artist, Claude Cahun.

Over the 26 years Torr lived and worked in New York, she performed in downtown locales such as the Mudd Club, ABC No Rio, Club 57, Tier 3, The Pyramid Club, S.N.A.F.U., Limbo Lounge and in art spaces/performance venues PS1, Franklin Furnace, The Kitchen, PS122, WOW Cafe, La MaMa and Limbo Lounge. As a member of the art group Colab, she was a participant and performer (with filmmaker Ruth Peyser) in The Times Square Show (1980) (where she performance with a rubber inflatable porno doll and sex toys), and as a solo artist at WPA, Washington (1981). Torr was one of the original members of the all-girl art band, DISBAND (along with members Martha Wilson, Ingrid Sischy, Ilona Granet and Donna Henes). DISBAND formed in 1978 and most recently performed at the Incheon International Women Artists' Biennial (2009) in South Korea, and in Salzburg at the Museum der Moderne, on 29 November 2014. During this time, she was also a member of the Guerrilla Girls and PONY (Prostitutes of New York).

Torr was the recipient of Scottish Arts Council funding, and received funding from Franklin Furnace Fund for Performance Art, Joyce Mertz Gilmore Foundation Fund, Art Matters, New York State Council on the Arts, Yorkshire and Humberside Arts, Haupstadtkulturfonds, Berlin, etc. She was a fellow of the Whitney Museum Independent Studies Program, and the Macdowell Arts Colony.

Torr's performances, videos and installations are widely presented in venues including GOMA (Gallery of Modern Art) Glasgow, Theater Schmidt, Hamburg, the genders that be, Minneapolis, Magma, Istanbul, ICA, London, LLGF Festival, Migros Museum, Zurich, Theater des Augenblicks, Vienna, Helsinki Act, WAVES Festival, Vordingborg and RE.AL, Lisbon and Theater Pradillo, Madrid, German National Historical Museum in Berlin (June until December 2015).

Torr's work has been reviewed in numerous publications, including: The New York Times, The Village Voice, New York Magazine, The Brooklyn Rail, The Washington Post, The Boston Globe, The Boston Phoenix, The San Francisco Chronicle, The Chicago Tribune, El Pais, El Mundo, Contact Quarterly, Movement Research, The London Independent, The Guardian, The Scotsman, The Sunday Herald, G.Q. Magazine, ELLE Magazine, Cosmopolitan Magazine, Paris, The Japan Times, Turkish Daily News, Ballettanz, Berlin, Die Tageszeitung, Berlin, Süddeutsche Zeitung, German Vogue, der Spiegel, Brigitte Magazine, Maxi Magazine, Bild Zeitung, Freitag 38, de Volkskrant, Opzij Magazine, Helsingin Sanomat, Ylioppilasieht, Helsinki, Diva Magazine, Bizarre Magazine, San Diego Union Tribune.

Torr died in Glasgow on May 31, 2017 of a brain tumour.

== "Man for a Day" workshops ==
Since 1990, Torr, inspired by and alongside drag king and transgender man Johnny Science, taught "drag king" workshops in which women and transmasculine people can learn not only to dress as a man but also codes of behaviour, gesture, body language and movement that constitute the performance of masculinity. The workshops, which Torr and Science taught widely in Europe, the US, India and Turkey, have been hugely influential, inspiring other works and a documentary film.

== Performances ==
- 1977 Egyptian Stock; World Shift
- 1978 The Half-Lives of Plutonium; Wind Fertilization
- 1979 Static Gravity; It's About Time (with Julie Harrison)
- 1980 The Speed of Sight
- 1981 Go-Go Girls Seize Control; WOW-A-Go-Go; The Right Thing To Do
- 1982 Amoebic Evolution; Arousing Reconstructions (with Bradley Wester; costumes by Mary Bright); Go-Go World (costume by Mary Bright)
- 1983 Vuur/Water (with Suze Hahn)
- 1984 Girl in Trouble
- 1985 Oedipus (with Billy Jacobson)
- 1986 Girls Will Be Boys Will Be Queens (with Chris Koenig and Lizzie Olesker; Set and Costumes by Loredana Rizzardi)
- 1987 Maldoror's Grey Lark (with Irving Gregory; visuals by Cathy Quinlan, and Martina Siebert; dramaturg - Billy Jacobson)
- 1988 Catastrophe And Beguilement 1989 PSSSSSST; I.V. Mermaid (with Martina Meijer)
- 1990 Crossing The River Styx (with performers: Martina Meijer, Marcel Meijer, Linda Yablonsky, Russell Christian, Steve Buscemi, Isobel Samaras; slide visuals by Nan Goldin; film by Peggy Ahwesh, and Jennifer Montgomery; costumes by Loredana Rizzardi; music by Judy Dunaway)
- 1992 Ready, Aye Ready (a standing cock has nae conscience) (with performers Paul Langland, Irving Gregory, Scott Herron, Adolpho Pati, Thomas Keith, Robin Casey, and visuals by Russell Christian)
- 1993 Scratch 'N Sniff/Touch 'N Feel
- 1994 Open for Flavor
- 1995 Drag Kings and Subjects; Context/Desire (with Daniel Safer, Elizabeth Albin); Jack Sprat/Happy Jack
- 1998 BULL! by Ian Smith (with Divine David, Anna Seagrave, Andre Stitt)
- 1999 Trans-Chans: Gender Is (A) Performance; Quick Change
- 2000 Millennium - The Past Behind
- 2001 Claude Cahun's Heroines; X Och Y
- 2002 All About My Brother; Mister "EE"
- 2003 Saint Sebastian in Mischief-La-Bas' "Painful Creatures"
- 2004 Male Impersonations x 6 for Tromolo (curated by "A Band Called Quinn")
- 2006 Donald Does Dusty
- 2007 Homage To Nam June Paik (courtesy Larry Miller)
- 2008 Fluxus Olympiad at the Tate (courtesy Larry Miller); All-In Grinsberg
- 2009 Turning Sexty

== Television and film credits ==
Torr's film/TV credits include:

- Protagonist in Gabriel Baur's pioneering film, Venus Boyz
- Part of "Mr. Braddock" in Mo Mahoney's film satire The Undergrad
- BBC2 Q.E.D. Programmer, Sex Acts
- HBO Real Sex
- Guest on Phil Donahue, Jerry Springer, Montel Williams, Gayle King
- Brigitta, RTL TV Magazine Programme
- A Shift Between Worlds - about experimenting with identity in the gendered world, based on two workshops led by Diane Torr, "Man for a Day" and "Woman for a Day." Kirsi Nevanti initiated and arranged the workshops at the Stockholm Academy of Dramatic Arts in 2013–2014. They resulted in several component works, including two video essays, two audio works and two large-format photographic works, the latter in collaboration with photographer Johan Bergmark. This subproject was presented at the doctoral 75% seminar and in a master class at the Tempo Documentary Film Festival in March 2015 (StDH/Uniarts 2013–2015), and was expanded with a short commentary film entitled Diane Speaks Out (2016).

== Publications ==
- Sex, Drag and Male Roles; Investigating Gender as Performance (co-authored by Stephen Bottoms) published by University of Michigan Press 2010. 978-0-472-05102-1 www.press.umich.edu
- Man for a Day – feature film on Torr's work by Berlin filmmaker, Katarina Peters, premiered 2012.
