= Michelle Parkerson =

American filmmaker and academic (born 1953)

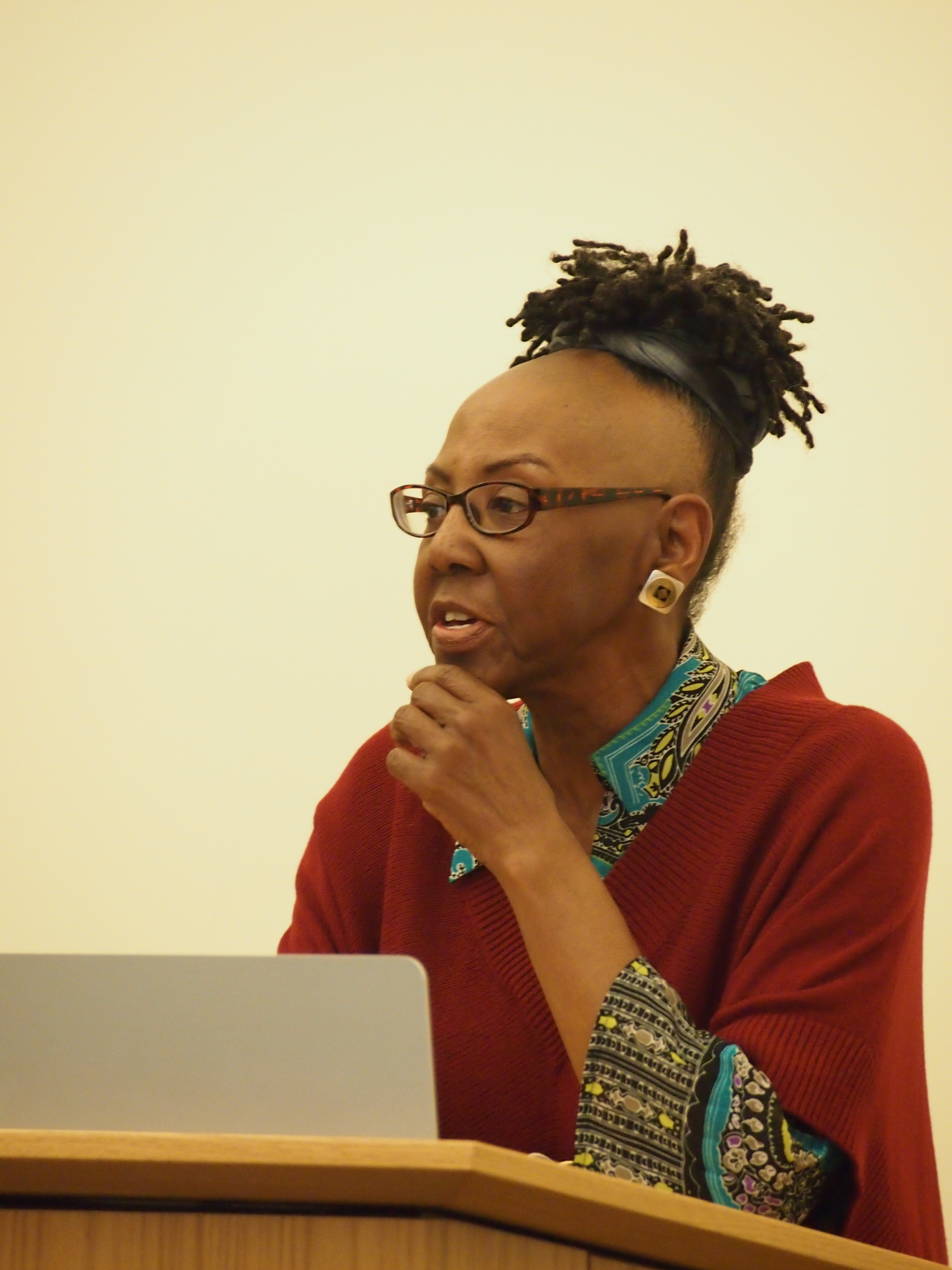
- Parkerson in 2014
- Born: November 1, 1953 (age 72); Washington D.C., U.S.
- Occupations: Filmmaker and academic

Michelle Parkerson (born November 1, 1953) is an American filmmaker and academic. She was an assistant professor of Film and Media Arts at Temple University and has been an independent filmmaker since the 1980s, focusing particularly on feminist and LGBTQ political activism and issues.

== Early life ==
Michelle Parkerson was born and raised in Washington, D.C. In the early 1980s, Parkerson and Essex Hemphill, a poet, activist, and friend of Parkerson's, would often perform spoken word poetry in D.C. coffeehouses and theaters. They received a grant from the Washington Project for the Arts in 1983 to produce an "experimental dramatization" of their poetry entitled Murder on Glass.

== Education and career ==
Parkerson majored in TV and film production and graduated in 1974 with a Bachelor of Arts in communications from Temple University with the short film Sojourn, a collaboration with cinematographer Jimi Lyons; the film won a Junior Academy Award. She is an alumna of the American Film Institute's Directing Workshop for Women (1991-1993).

Parkerson heads the DC-based production company Eye of the Storm Productions.

Parkerson has received funding from ITVS and the American Film Institute, as well as a fellowship from the Rockefeller Foundation. She was awarded the Prix du Public at the Festival International de Films de Femmes and the Audience and Best Biography Awards at the San Francisco International Film Festival. Her films are distributed by Women Make Movies and Third World Newsreel.

She was assistant professor in Film and Media Arts at Temple University.

She published a volume of poetry, Waiting Rooms, in 1983.

Parkerson was featured in the 2008 documentary black./womyn.: conversations with lesbians of African descent.

=== Films ===
Gloria J. Gibson describes how Parkerson's films "highlight the identities of black women as performers and social activists [and] serve as a major contributor to the development of a black documentary style that seeks a holistic approach to African American life."

Her documentaries have featured major African-American figures including jazz musician Betty Carter, musical group Sweet Honey in the Rock, activist Stormé DeLarverie, and writer Audre Lorde, the latter two with a particular focus on sexuality and LGBTQ activism. Her short film Odds and Ends is a lesbian Afrofuturist science fiction story.

== Filmography ==
- Sojourn (1973, with Jimi Lyons)
- ...But Then She's Betty Carter (1980)
- I Remember Betty (1987)
- Urban Odyssey (1991)
- Storme: Lady of the Jewel Box (1991)
- Odds and Ends (1993)
- Gotta Make This Journey: Sweet Honey in the Rock (1983, as producer)
- A Litany for Survival: The Life and Work of Audre Lorde (1995, with Ada Gay Griffin)

== Awards ==
- Nominee for Grand Jury Prize at Sundance Film Festival in 1995 for A Litany for Survival: The Life and Work of Audre Lorde

== Bibliography ==
- Parkerson, Michelle. Waiting Rooms. Common Ground Press (1983).
