= Gowongo Mohawk =

Seneca playwright and actor (1860–1924)

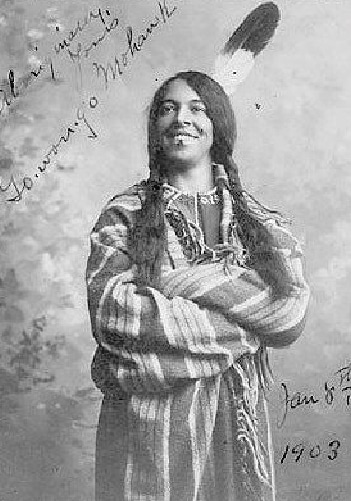
- Gowongo Mohawk in a 1908 publication
- Born: August 11, 1859; Gowanda, New York
- Died: February 7, 1924 (aged 64); Edgewater, New Jersey
- Known for: Actor, playwright
- Notable work: Wep-ton-no-mah, the Indian Mail Carrier

Gowongo Mohawk (Go-Won-Go/Go-Wan-Go; August 11, 1859 (Note: Records vary on exact birthdate) – February 7, 1924) was a Seneca playwright and actor. Unsatisfied with the roles being offered to her as a Native American woman, she wrote her own, highly successful play and cast herself as the heroic male lead.

== Personal life ==
She was born in Gowanda, New York, to father Ga-Na-Gua, also known as Dr. Alan Mohawk, a chief medicine man of the Seneca Nation, and mother Lydia, who was known as "The Angle" on the Cattaraugus Reservation. Her English birth name was Carrie A. Mohawk, (Note: or sometimes Carolina) but she later permanently adopted her Indigenous name Gowongo, which translates to "I fear no one." In an interview with the Liverpool Weekly Courier, she gave an English translation of her name as 'Majestic Palm', along with a signed photograph of herself.

Her parents both died when she was a minor: her father when she was about 10 and her mother when she was about 15. As a child she attended boarding school in Ohio, which she did not enjoy, and later attended university at the University of Ohio. Before writing her first play, she acted with Louise Pomeroy and at the Windsor Theatre.

She briefly married James Rider, a white Civil War veteran, but left due to abuse. She married her second husband Charles W. Charles, an actor and former army captain who served with General Custer, in 1888.

She died in 1924 at the age of 64 and is buried in Edgewater Cemetery, New Jersey, with her second husband.

== Career ==
Beginning her performing career in America, Gowongo's prestige as an actor and playwright translated to Canada and then across the Atlantic to the United Kingdom where she toured her work.

The first performances of Wep-ton-no-mah were in 1889, on the American vaudeville circuit. She then took the play to Canada and then England. She toured England for nine years, from 1893 to 1897 and then 1903 to 1908.

Besides Wep-ton-no-mah, The Indian Mail Carrier, her best known work, in 1900, she starred in a Broadway melodrama, Lincoln J. Carter's “The Flaming Arrow,” again playing a Native American man. Gowongo also wrote one other play, An Indian Romance: A Forest Tragedy, but it was not produced and no copy survives.

The Brooklyn Daily Eagle described her thus: “She acts with intelligence and has the repose of an expert," though it also referred to her as a "presumed Indian woman" and added "If Mohawk is Indian, she is oddly light in color," and otherwise seemed doubtful of her racial identity.

She was sometimes billed as the “only living Indian actress” or the "first Indian actress”, though Professor Bethany Hughes thinks this was more of a marketing tactic and not strictly accurate.

== Wep-ton-no-mah, The Indian Mail Carrier ==
Gowongo's most famed work as a playwright, Wep-ton-no-Mah, The Indian Mail Carrier, sparked the interest of audiences and the general public across America and Britain. Playing the role of Wep-ton-no-Mah, a Native American man, Gowongo troubled stereotypes of Indigeneity, race, gender, and sexuality while engaging in the contemporary urge to reimagine the frontier, as seen in the popular Buffalo Bill Wild West Shows, which she also performed in. Wep-ton-no-mah, The Indian Mail Carrier was first performed in the UK in Liverpool in April 1893, and quickly became incredibly popular. A copy of the script survives at the Library of Congress and has been digitized.

Gowongo wrote Wep-ton-no-mah so that she could play the type of assertive, action-heavy role she wanted. She told The Des Moines Register and Leader, "I grew tired of being cast in uncongenial roles". She decided to cast herself as the male lead because "I said to myself that I must have something free and wild that would fit with my own nature, I wanted to ride and wrestle, and I thought, 'Well, I can't do that as a woman, I must act a man, or better, a boy.'"

=== Characters ===
==== Wep-ton-no-mah ====
The protagonist and eponymous 'mail carrier'. He is the son of Chief Ga-ne-gua, and described as the "noblest, bravest, most gentlemanly" of men. Played by Gowongo Mohawk herself.

==== Chief Ga-ne-gua ====
Wep-ton-no-mah's father and chief of his tribe. Portrayed as a very wise and kindly man. Named after Gowongo's father. Played by the real life Chief Ga-ne-gua.

==== Colonel Stockton ====
A rich man and local landowner who earned his wealth through a career in the army. He has a good relationship with the local Native American tribe, and with his servants. Played by Gowongo Mohawks husband, Charles W. Charles.

==== Nellie Stockton ====
Colonel Stockton's daughter, and implied romantic interest to Wep-ton-no-mah.

==== Captain Franklin ====
The nephew of Colonel Stockton. A Captain in the army, he is continuously in need of money to fund his youthful exploits, and also because he's being blackmailed.

==== Spanish Joe ====
The villain of the story. A murderer, extortionist, and thief. He is introduced as a friend of Captain Franklin, regardless of what disguise he is wearing, but isn't a very good one. Played by George De Laclaire in the British tour

==== Sam, Matilda, and Garry ====
Servants of Colonel Stockton and Nellie. Sam and Matilda are played always by black actors, and speak in a form of AAVE. All three play comedic roles.

==== Wongy and Buckskin ====
Wep-ton-no-mah's beloved horses. The true heroes of the story. The two horses used in performances were trained by Gowongo Mohawk herself.

=== Plot ===
The play begins with Captain Franklin and Spanish Joe arriving at Colonel Stockton's estate. Captain Franklin needs to ask his uncle for more money as he has run out and is being blackmailed because he did something bad that his superior cannot find out about. He also intends to introduce Joe, his friend, to his uncle and his family. Colonel Stockton refuses to give his nephew any more money at the suggestion of his servants, but quickly resolves to give him some the next time he asks

During a stampede. Wep-ton-no-mah saves Nellie Stockton's life, and is thus offered the job of mail carrier by Colonel Stockton.

Spanish Joe plots with Captain Franklin to kidnap Nellie, and marry her, but he is thwarted by Wep-ton-no-mah. Nellie has already professed that she is in love with him at this point, and jealousy makes Joe mad enough to plan to kill Wep-ton-no-mah. He shoots his gun, thinking it is aimed at Wep-ton-no-mah, but actually hits his father, Chief Ga-ne-gua, who dies in his stead. Wep-ton-no-mah swears vengeance on the man who killed his father, and Spanish Joe flees.

Several years later, Wep-ton-no-mah returns from chasing down bandits, and agrees - reluctantly - to finally take the job he was offered by Colonel Stockton. Around the same time, Spanish Joe returns, still planning to kill Wep-ton-no-mah. Before this however, he enters Colonel Stockton's house, disguised as another friend of Captain Franklin's, and attempts to steal some money from his desk. Wep-ton-no-mah stops him, but Spanish Joe is able to escape.

Wep-ton-no-mah has been given an important mail carrying assignment, and Spanish Joe's newest plan is to waylay him - taking advantage of Wep-ton-no-mah's trusting nature by poisoning his drink - steal the mail, and kill Wep-ton-no-mah. To begin with, this plan goes well. Wep-ton-no-mah is poisoned, and he gives the mail to his horse, Wongy, for safekeeping. Spanish Joe's accomplice has, however, switched sides, and so Garry and Sam (two of Colonel Stockton's servants) discover that Wep-ton-no-mah is in trouble and go to find him. Wongy fights off Spanish Joe who briefly runs away before he can be discovered, and Sam and Garry help Wep-ton-no-mah home. Later that evening, there is a final stand-off between Wep-ton-no-mah and Spanish Joe, featuring a fire on stage, multiple explosions and a knife fight at the end of which Spanish Joe is defeated.
