= Stormé DeLarverie =

American singer, activist and instigator of the Stonewall Uprising (1920–2014)

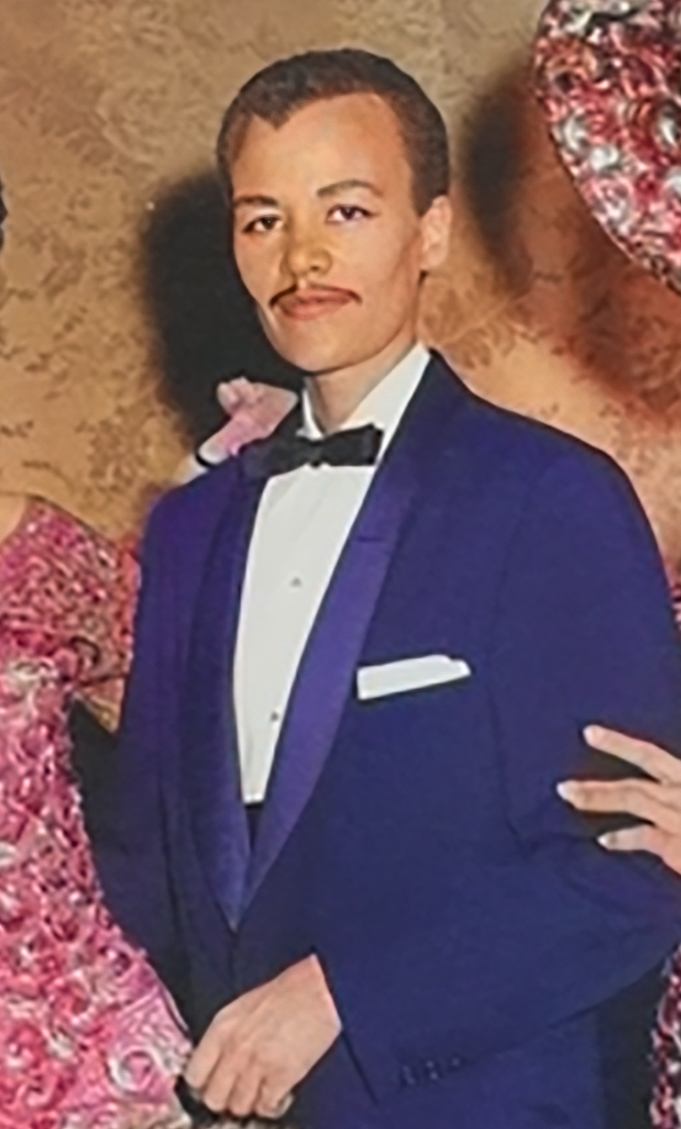
- Stormé DeLarverie in 1958
- Born: Viva May Thomas c. December 24, 1920; New Orleans, Louisiana, U.S.
- Died: May 24, 2014 (aged 93); Brooklyn, New York, U.S.
- Occupations: Master of Ceremonies, bodyguard, singer, bouncer, drag king

Stormé DeLarverie (c. December 24, 1920 – May 24, 2014) was an American known as the lesbian whose scuffle with police was, according to DeLarverie and many eyewitnesses, the spark that ignited the Stonewall uprising, spurring the crowd to action.

Born in New Orleans, to an interracial couple, she is remembered as a gay civil rights icon and entertainer who performed and hosted at the Apollo Theater and Radio City Music Hall. She worked for much of her life as an MC, singer, bouncer, bodyguard, and volunteer street patrol worker, the last of which earned DeLarverie the moniker, "guardian of lesbians in the Village". She is known as "the Rosa Parks of the gay community."

== Personal life ==
DeLarverie's mother was Black and worked as a domestic worker in her white father's home. Due to her biracial status, her birth was never registered but she celebrated birthdays on December 24, Christmas Eve.

Her father paid for her education and she was largely raised by her grandfather. She said of her childhood, "The white kids were beating me up; the Black kids were. Everybody was jumping on me. ... For being a negro with a white face." She described realizing her attraction to women near the age of eighteen.

Biracial and androgynous, DeLarverie could pass for white or Black, male or female. Trying to abide by cross-dressing laws by wearing feminine clothes simply led to being twice picked up on the streets by police who mistook her for a drag queen.

She lived with partner Diana, a dancer, for about 25 years until Diana died in the 1970s. According to her friend Lisa Cannistraci, DeLarverie carried a photograph of Diana with her at all times.

== Stonewall uprising ==
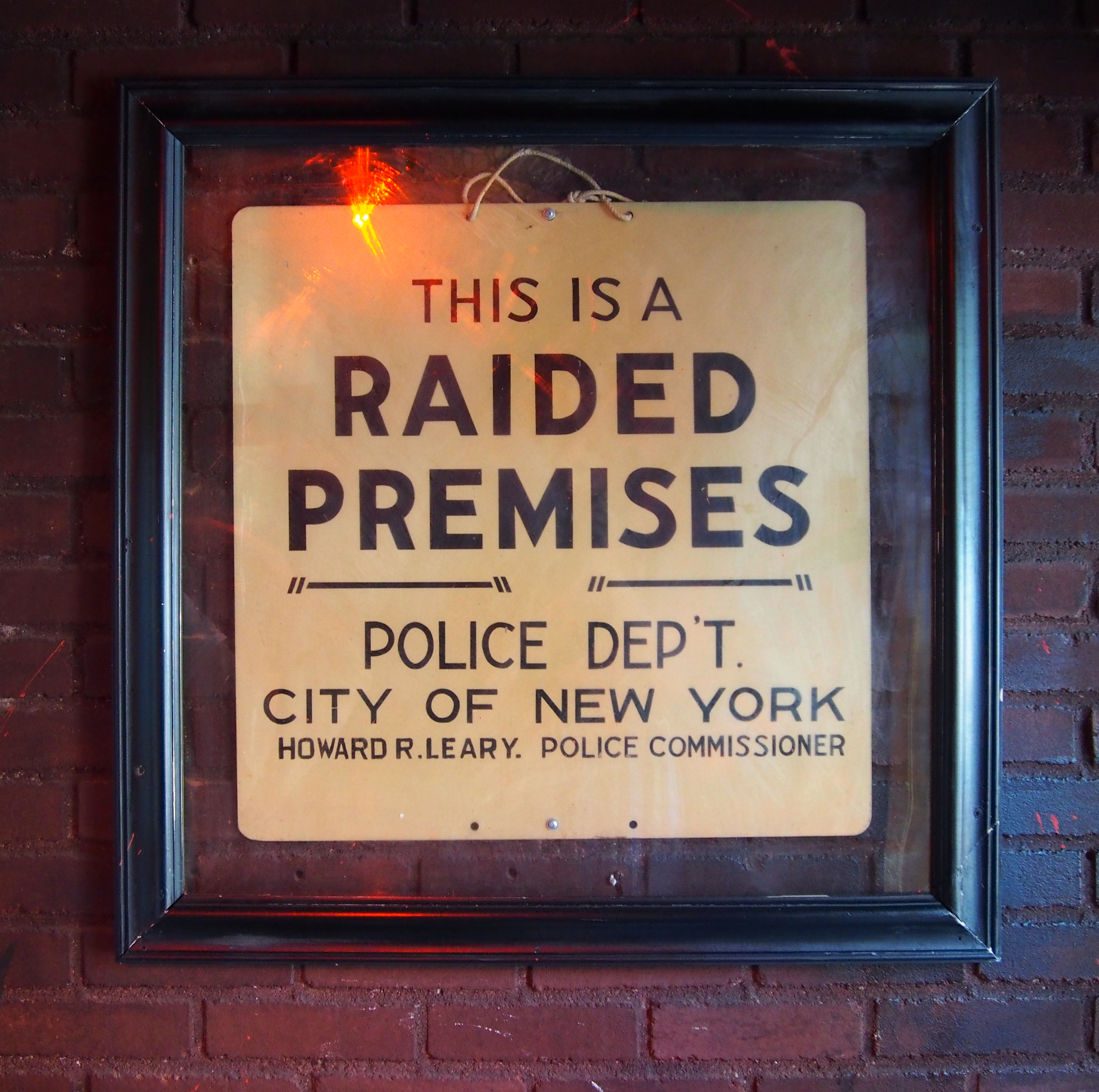
The "raided premises" police warning plaque hanging by the door of the Stonewall Inn

DeLarverie strenuously and persistently resisted an arrest being effected by law enforcement. Accounts of people who witnessed the scene, including letters and news reports of the butch lesbian who fought with police, conflicted. Where witnesses claim one woman who fought against violence at the hands of the police caused the crowd to become angry, some also remembered several "butch lesbians" had begun to resist while still in the bar. At least one was already bleeding when taken out of the bar.

The sole argument raised against this lesbian being DeLarverie is that some witnesses reported this person was "caucasian." However, being biracial, DeLarverie could appear Black, white, or biracial, depending on lighting, dress, and the expectations of the audience.

== The Jewel Box Revue ==
From 1955 to 1969, DeLarverie toured the Black theater circuit as the MC (and only drag king) of the Jewel Box Revue, North America's first racially integrated drag revue. The revue regularly played the Apollo Theater in Harlem, as well as to mixed-race audiences, something that was still rare during the era of racial segregation in the United States. DeLarverie performed as a baritone.

In 1987, Michelle Parkerson released the first cut of the movie, Stormé: The Lady of the Jewel Box, about DeLarverie and her time with the revue.

== Personal identity ==
It seems unlikely DeLarverie ever publicly expressed a specific gender identity, as confirmed by Michele Zalopany, one of DeLarverie’s neighbors, saying DeLarverie didn't "identify as anything but chose to live her life as a Black man." When prompted to personally identify, DeLarverie asked to simply be known "as me," and when asked what pronouns she preferred, DeLarverie is reported to have said, "Whatever makes YOU feel most comfortable," and that "I'm still a woman." DeLarverie was reported to have used multiple sets of pronouns. Long-time friend Lisa Cannistraci has gone on record saying that she believes DeLarverie was non-binary.

== Illness and death ==
DeLarverie suffered from dementia in later life. From 2010 to 2014, she lived in a nursing home in Brooklyn. Though she seemingly did not recognize being in a nursing home, her memories of childhood and the Stonewall Uprisings remained strong.

On June 7, 2012, Brooklyn Pride, Inc. honored Stormé DeLarverie at the Brooklyn Society for Ethical Culture. Michelle Parkerson's film, Stormé: The Lady of the Jewel Box, was screened. On April 24, 2014, she was honored alongside Edith Windsor by the Brooklyn Community Pride Center, for her fearlessness and bravery and was also presented with a proclamation from New York City Public Advocate, Letitia James.

DeLarverie died in her sleep on May 24, 2014, in Brooklyn. No immediate family members were alive at the time of her death. Lisa Cannistraci, who became one of her legal guardians, gave the cause of death as heart attack. She remembers DeLarverie as "a very serious woman when it came to protecting people she loved." Her funeral was held May 29, 2014, at the Greenwich Village Funeral Home.

== See also ==
- LGBT culture in New York City
- List of LGBT people from New York City
- NYC Pride March
