= Revry =

American global streaming network

Revry, Inc.
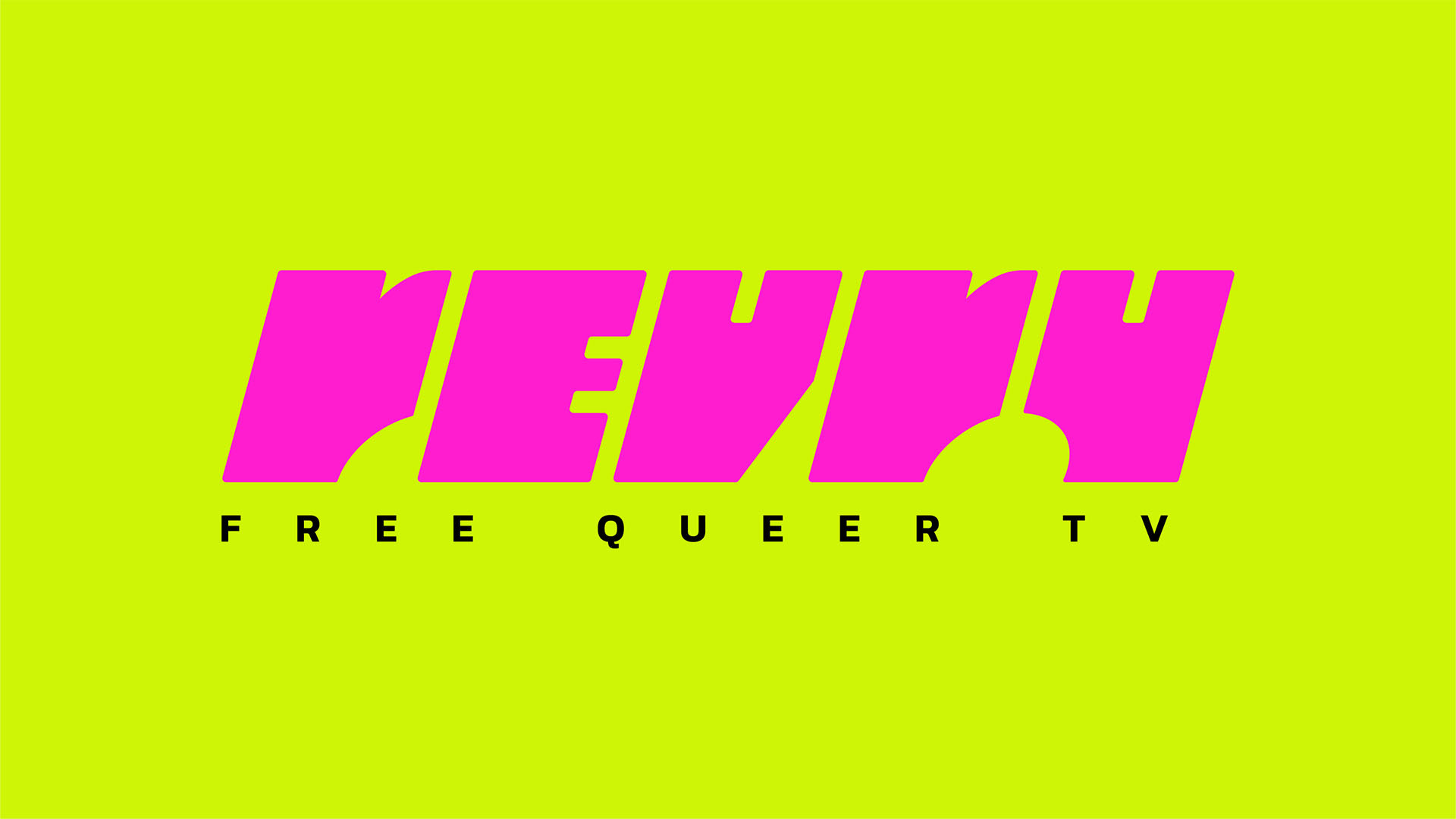
- Website type: Streaming network
- Headquarters: Glendale, California
- Products: Streaming media; Video on demand; Television on demand
- Services: Television production; Digital distribution; Web syndication
- Website: revry.com/home

Revry (Revry.tv) is a global streaming network launched in 2016 that focuses on queer content and creators. It was founded by Damian Pelliccione, Wadooah Wali, Alia J. Daniels, Christopher Rodriguez, and LaShawn McGhee. The website offers a curated selection of films, series, podcasts, music, and videos. Additionally, Revry releases original content, including the series Gayborhood, Before I Got Famous, and Drag Roast, as well as numerous podcasts. Its content is available online and via services including iOS, Apple TV, Amazon Fire, Android TV, Roku, Samsung TV Plus, Philo and TiVo

In addition to its LGBTQ+ themes, Revry promotes content inclusive of racial and ethnic diversity. In 2019, founder Rodriguez said, "I think a driving force behind our programming is reflecting the community as we are as opposed to what's trendy or what big-wig execs think is marketable."

Revry's company headquarters are in Glendale, California.
