= Drag king =

Entertainer dressed and acting with exaggerated masculinity

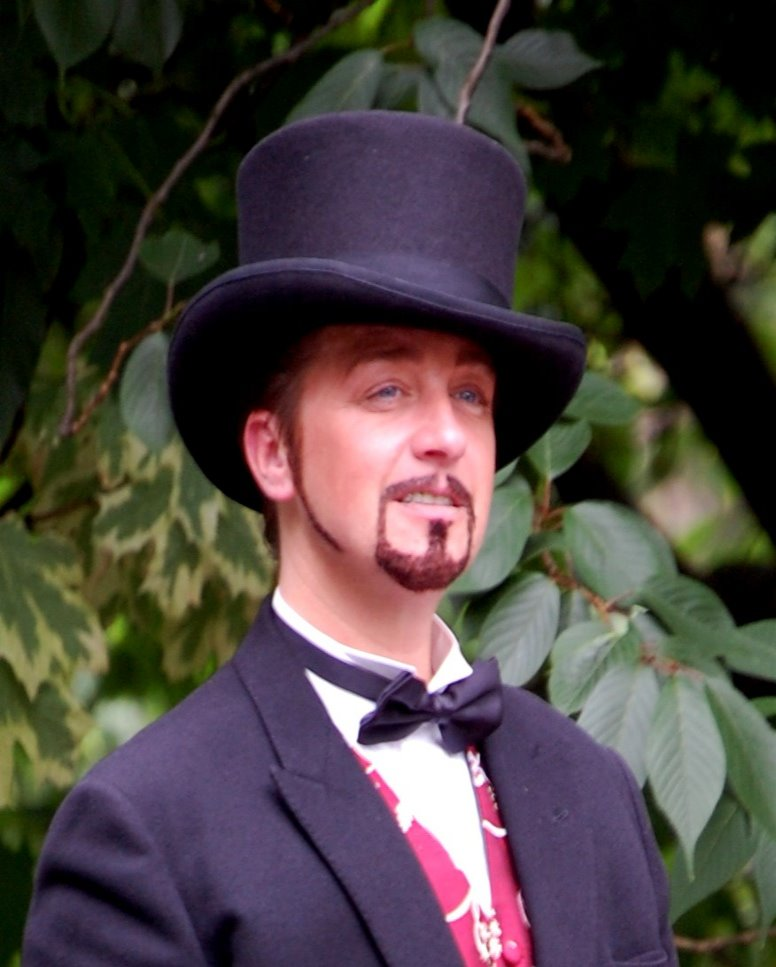
A drag king performer

Drag kings have historically been mostly female performance artists who dress in masculine drag and personify male gender stereotypes as part of an individual or group routine. As documented in the 2003 Journal of Homosexuality, the world of drag kings has broadened to include performers of all gender expressions. A typical drag show may incorporate dancing, acting, stand-up comedy and singing, either live or lip-syncing to pre-recorded tracks. Drag kings often perform as exaggeratedly macho male characters, portray characters such as construction workers and rappers, or impersonate male celebrities like Elvis Presley, Michael Jackson and Tim McGraw. Drag kings may also perform as personas that do not clearly align with the gender binary. Drag personas that combine both stereotypically masculine and feminine traits are common in modern drag king shows.

In the late 1800s and early 1900s, several drag kings became British music hall stars. British pantomime has preserved the tradition of women performing in male roles. Starting in the mid-1990s, drag kings began to gain some of the fame and attention that drag queens have known.

== History and terminology ==
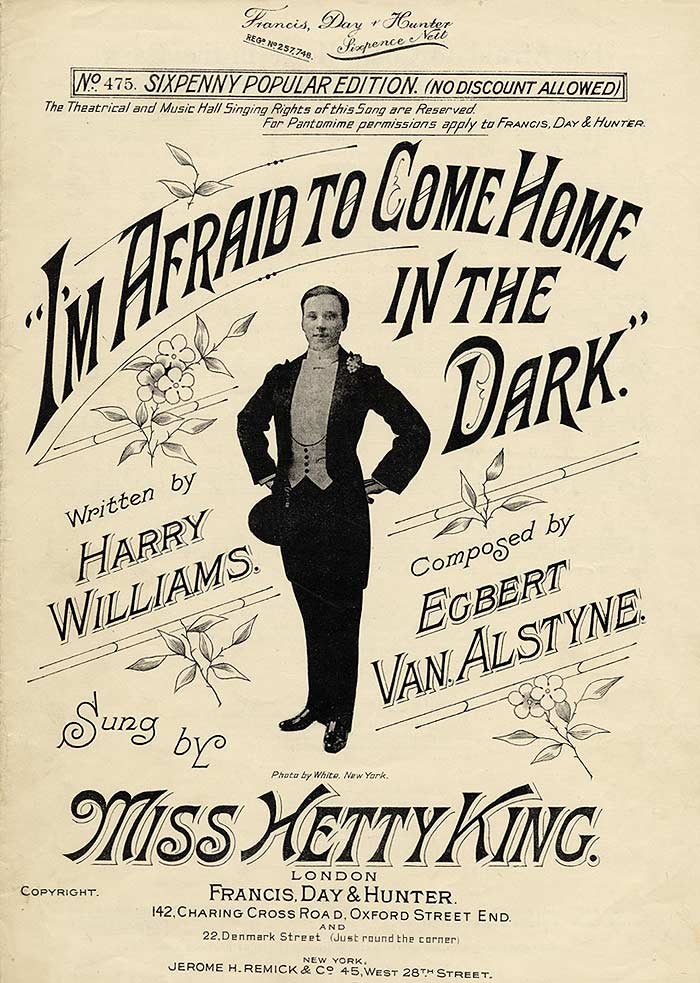
A 1907 sheet music cover of "I'm Afraid to Come Home in the Dark" featuring singer and male impersonator Hetty King.

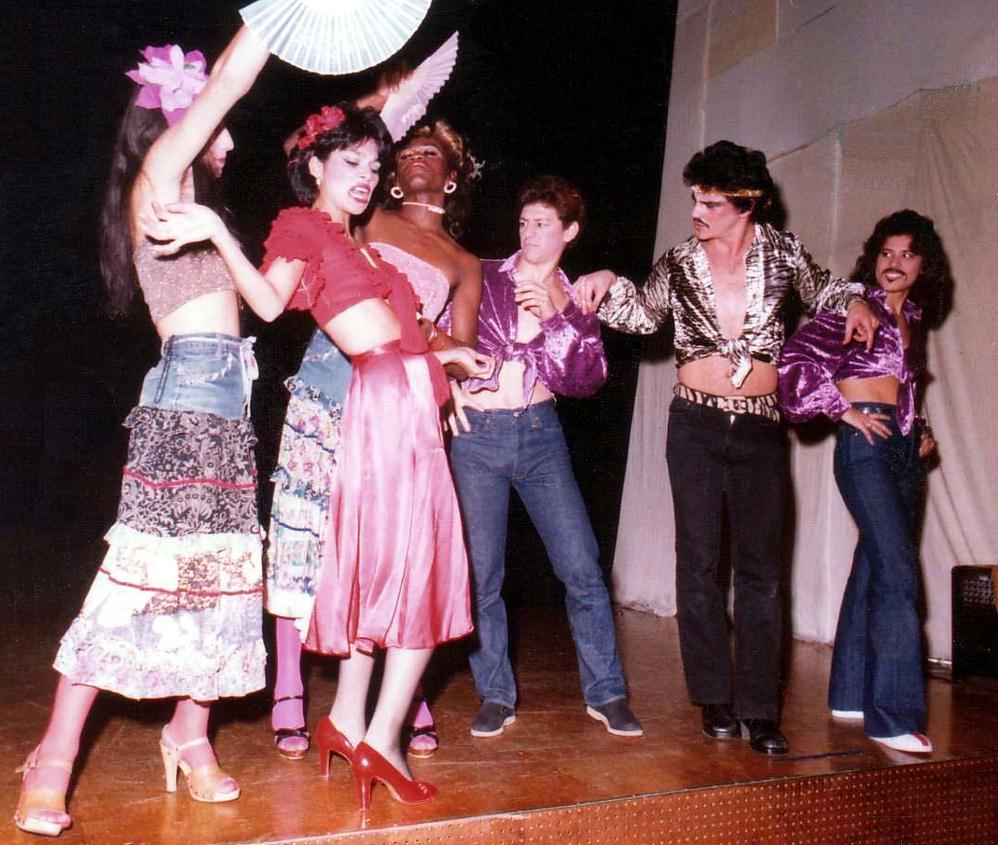
Drag king character Macho (far right) in the "America" number of Wild Side Story in Los Angeles in 1977.

While the term drag king was first cited in print in 1972, there is a longer history of female performers dressing in male attire. In China, the practice of "female men [characters]" (kunsheng; see also sheng roles), in which women portrayed men in stage performances, was first documented during the middle Tang dynasty (617–908 CE). This continued through to the early Qing dynasty, when the Qianlong Emperor banned actresses from performing in 1722. It was revived in the late 19th and 20th centuries as the ban on actresses was loosened.

In theatre and opera, there was a tradition of breeches roles and en travesti. In France and Italy in the 17th century, women would play male roles in a form of theater called commedia dell'arte. Actress and playwright Susanna Centlivre appeared in breeches roles around 1700. The first popular male impersonator in U.S. theatre was Annie Hindle, who started performing in New York in 1867. In 1886, she married her dresser, Annie Ryan.

British music hall performer Vesta Tilley, who cites American male impersonator Ella Wesner as an inspiration, was active in the late 19th and early 20th centuries as a male impersonator. Tilley gave her last performance in 1920, and retired until her death in 1952. Other male impersonators on the British stage were Ella Shields and Hetty King. Vaudeville entertainer Florence Hines was popular for her act in the 1890s. Blues singer Gladys Bentley performed in male attire in New York, Los Angeles and San Francisco from the 1920s through 1940s. In the early 1900s, Gowongo Mohawk was "likely the first Indigenous male impersonator". Stormé DeLarverie performed in male drag as the master of ceremonies, and sole female performer, of the drag troupe the Jewel Box Revue in the 1950s and 1960s. She is featured in the documentary Storme: The Lady of the Jewel Box. While the Stonewall riots of June 1969 were a series of spontaneous uprisings by many people, DeLarverie—who was the first to fight back against the police brutality—is believed to have provided the spark that ignited the riot. Elsie Saldana, otherwise known as El Daña, started performing in 1965, and as of 2025 was still performing, earning her the Guinness World Record for Oldest Drag King.

Drag king culture in Australia flourished in lesbian bars from the 1990s and 2000s, but began to fade in the 2010s. In the UK, Drag Couple Adam All and Apple Derrieres set up Drag King Cabaret night "BOiBOX" in 2013 in Soho's Candy Bar, a queer women's venue that closed in 2014. They were worried about finding enough performers to make their talent night work "[b]ecause there were barely any stages for us to perform [on], very few drag kings were actively pursuing gigs". BOIBOX inspired a new wave of budding kings and celebrated ten years in 2023 with a show at The Phoenix Arts Club in London's Westend, with a surprise appearance from Landon Cider.

The term drag king is sometimes used in a broader sense, to include female-bodied people who dress in traditionally masculine clothing for other reasons. This usage includes women temporarily attempting to pass as men, and women who wish to present themselves in a masculine gender role without identifying as a man. Diane Torr began leading Drag King Workshops in 1989 that offer women a lesson in passing as men. Torr was featured in the 2002 film on drag kings Venus Boyz.

Drag kings have historically been more marginalized by pop culture than drag queens, who began playing a larger role in mainstream pop culture from the late 20th century onwards. Drag kings have also historically been marginalized in academic LGBTQ studies. Since the 2010s, drag kings have started to play a slightly more visible role in the LGBTQ community. Sleek Magazine described this renaissance of drag king culture in a 2019 article titled "What's behind the drag king revolution?"

The British drag king collective "Pecs", a troupe made up entirely of women and non-binary people, was founded in 2013 and went on to perform at Soho Theatre and The Glory. In 2016, director Nicole Miyahara produced The Making of a King, a documentary film chronicling the lives of contemporary drag kings in Los Angeles. The first drag king to appear in a television show was New Zealand artist and comedian Hugo Grrrl who won the inaugural season of the New Zealand reality competition House of Drag in 2018. In 2019, American artist Landon Cider was the first drag king and cisgender woman to appear on a televised US drag competition when he won the third season of The Boulet Brothers' Dragula. In June 2022, three drag kings made a guest appearance in series one of Drag Race France, the first time the Drag Race franchise included drag kings.

== Drag community ==
A British lesbian cabaret organization called Lesburlesque made it part of their mission to promote drag kings on the wider British cabaret circuit. Their founder, Pixie Truffle, gave an interview to the Guardian newspaper in the United Kingdom on her desire for drag kings to close the gap with queens and with male stand-up comedians.

Similar to some drag queens who prefer to be seen as actors—like Justin Vivian Bond and Lypsinka—some drag kings prefer not to be categorized by the drag king label. "I think when people assume that somebody is queer, or different, or trans, they always want to put something before their name", said Murray Hill in an interview. "And that is what drag king has been. Why can not you just call me a comedian like Jerry Seinfeld is called a comedian?"

Some drag king performers have adopted other terms to describe their own performance styles, particularly if they deviate from the more traditional forms of "kinging". Common names including "gender blurring", acknowledging the merging of both male and female traits in the performances. Vancouver performer Rose Butch adopted the ambiguous label "drag thing". Long-time performer Flare called the stage of drag king styles that emerged in Toronto's scene in the mid-2010s as "unicorn drag". Some kings also construct their drag around a particular subculture or style, such as "drag clowns" or "drag creatures" like Henlo Bullfrog.

== Tools of gender illusion ==
One method drag kings have used to modify their facial features is burning a wine cork and smudging it along the jaw to create the illusion of a beard or stubble. Kings may aim to deepen the colour of their eyebrows or create a fuller look with dark eyeliner or other makeup. Similarly, some methods call for layering liquid eyeliner over the cork ash, or dark makeup base. When trying to achieve a realistic look, drag kings may add crepe hair over the makeup using glue, thus completing the illusion of a full beard.

Drag kings also make use of items such as socks and silicone prosthetics when packing, or creating the illusion of a phallus.

An important part of gender illusion is the way a drag performer utilizes body language and takes up space on stage. Some kings will incorporate more aggressive choreography into their routines to emulate or expand on stereotypical masculine characteristics. Accessories, rhinestones and elaborate costumes contribute to a drag king's performance.

Body shaping apparel, most commonly binders, kinesiology tape, and sports bras, are used to create the look of a flat chest. For hiding one's breasts, some use a method involving cutting a hole in the crotch of pantyhose for the head and making sleeves out the legs. Some drag kings use silicone chest plates that are pulled over the head to create a muscular, masculine chest shape and cover the breasts.

== In entertainment ==
=== In film ===
- The 1941 musical movie Babes on Broadway included Judy Garland in black male drag singing a song "Franklin Delano Jones", about a fictional first black president of the United States.
- Victor/Victoria (1982)
- Connie and Carla (2004)
- Rebel Dykes (2021)

=== In TV ===
- The Boulet Brothers' Dragula
- King of Drag (2025–)

=== In literature ===
- In the manga Moriarty the Patriot, Irene Adler, an associate of Sherlock Holmes and the titular Moriarty brothers, has a drag king persona of a spy named James Bonde.

=== In music ===
- Little Mix presented as drag kings in the music video for their 2021 song "Confetti".

== See also ==
- AFAB queen – Subtype of drag queen
- Genres Pluriels – Belgian non-governmental organisation
- List of drag kings
- List of transgender-related topics
- Pepi Litman – Yiddish vaudeville singer (1876–1930)
- Postgenderism – Movement against gender roles
- Principal boy – Breeches role in theatre
- Tomboy – Girl who behaves boyishly
- Transvestism – Former medicalized framework describing gender nonconformity
- Of Drag Kings and the Wheel of Fate
