= List of programs broadcast by OUTtv =

This is a list of television programs which have aired on the Canadian television channel OUTtv. The purpose of this list is to be a comprehensive reference for all programs which have ever aired on the network; shows are not removed from the list below on the basis that they're no longer airing.

== 0-9 ==
- 1 Girl 5 Gays

== A ==
- The A-List: Dallas
- The A-List: New York
- Absolutely Fabulous
- The Afterlife with Suzane Northrop
- Alan Carr: Chatty Man
- Alan Carr: Tooth Fairy Live
- Ask Dr. Keith
- Avocado Toast

== B ==
- Bad Girls
- Banana
- Baroness von Sketch Show
- Beautiful People
- Because I Said So
- Behind the Bar
- Beverly Hills Fabulous
- The Big Bow Wow
- Big Freedia: Queen of Bounce
- Birch & Co.
- The Boulet Brothers' Dragula
- BoysTown
- Breaker High
- Brideshead Revisited
- The Browns
- Bump!

== C ==
- Call Me Mother
- Cam Boy
- Canada's Drag Race
- The Canadian Travel Show
- Candy Bar Girls
- Cannonball
- Chasing Spring
- Chatty Man Christmas
- Cherry Bomb
- Choccywoccydoodah
- Chris & John to the Rescue!
- Chris & John's Halloween Superstar!
- Chris & John's Road Trip!
- Closeted Hollywood
- Colin and Justin's Cabin Pressure
- Colin and Justin's Home Heist
- Coming Out Stories
- Conchita - Queen of Austria
- Conchita - Unstoppable
- Country Dreams
- COVERguy
- Cucumber
- Curl Girls

== D ==
- The Dame Edna Experience
- Dame Edna Live at the Palace
- Dante's Cove
- Dating Unlocked
- David Bowie - Five Years
- David Bowie - Love You Till Tuesday
- Degrassi: The Next Generation
- Del Shores - My Sordid Life
- Designer Travel
- Discovering Elton John
- Discovering Queen
- Dish!
- The DL Chronicles
- Dolly Parton - Song by Song
- Dolly Parton Live @Glastonbury
- The Donald Strachey Mysteries
- Don't Quit Your Gay Job
- Dr. Barry
- Dr. Terrible's House of Horrible
- Drag Heals
- Drag Queens of London
- Drag Race Canada
- DTLA
- DTLA After Dark
- Dyke TV

== E ==
- El Mundo Del Lundo
- Elite Model Look
- Elton John - Million Dollar Piano
- Elvira Kurt: Adventures in Comedy
- End of Second Class
- Entrée to Asia
- Eros
- Eurovision Song Contest 2014
- Eurovision Song Contest 2015
- Exes and Ohs
- Eyewitness
- Ezra

== F ==
- Fabulocity
- The Face of Furry Creek
- Face to Face with David
- Fairy Tale
- Fak Yaass
- Fatherhood Dreams
- Favourite Places
- Finding Prince Charming
- Freddie Mercury: The Great Pretender
- Freefall
- From Katya With Love
- For the Boys TV!
- For the Love of DILFS
- F*cking Smart

== G ==
- The G Factor
- Gauntlet of Gaymes
- The Gavin Crawford Show
- Gay Army
- Gay for Play
- Gay Getaways
- Gay News Network
- The Gayest Show Ever
- Get Up & Grow
- Gimme Gimme Gimme
- Girls on Top
- Glee
- Gone
- GoGo for the Gold
- Goodness Gracious Me
- The Goods
- Got 2B There
- The Graham Norton Effect
- Group Sext

== H ==
- He's Fit
- Heading Out
- Hey Qween!
- The High Life
- Hit & Miss
- Homorazzi
- Hot Gay Comics
- Hot Haus
- Hot Pink Shorts
- House of Drag
- House of Venus Show
- How Far Will You Go?
- The Hunks

== I ==
- I Do?
- Iconic Justice
- Identities
- I Now Pronounce You...
- I'm a Porn Star
- I'm a Stripper
- I'm Coming Out
- Improv Comedy: Tops & Bottoms
- In & Out Moments
- In the Big House
- In the Kitchen with Stefano Faita

== J ==
- Jawbreaker
- Jersey Strong
- Judge Rinder

== K ==
- Karma Trekkers
- The Kids in the Hall
- Kitty 911
- Knock Knock Ghost
- KoKo Pop

== L ==
- The L Word
- Ladyboys
- The Lair
- Lesbian Angels
- Leslie Jordan: My Life Down the Pink Carpet
- Let's Talk Sex
- Locker Room
- London Live
- Love Handles

== M ==
- Make It Raw
- Manhunt
- Married in Canada
- Men's Fashion Insider
- Metro Sexual
- Metrosexuality
- Mile High
- Mom vs. Matchmaker
- Morgan Brayton and Other People
- Mr. Gay Canada
- My Mums Used To Be Men
- My Family Starring Me
- My Trans Journey

== N ==
- Naked Attraction
- Naked News Daily Male
- Neighbours
- Never Apart
- The New Addams Family
- The New Normal
- The Next American Gay
- Ninja Turtles: The Next Mutation

== O ==
- Operation: Vacation
- Out and About
- Out for Laughs
- Out in the City
- Out on TV
- Out There
- Outlook TV
- OUTspoken
- OUTspoken Biography

== P ==
- Paradise Falls
- Pass the Salt
- Pet Shop Boys: A Life in Pop
- Pet Shop Boys Live at the O2
- Picture This!
- Pink Planet
- PinkSixty News
- The Pinkertons
- Politics of the Heart
- Positive Youth
- Pretty Boys
- Pride
- Pride Rises
- Pride Talks
- Psychic Queen
- Psycho Kitty

== Q ==
- QT: QueerTelevision
- Queen City
- Queen Live At Wembley Stadium
- Queen Rock Montreal
- Queer as Folk (North American)
- Queer as Folk (UK)
- Queer Life
- Queer Nineties
- Queer Street
- QueerTV

== R ==
- The Real Anne Lister
- Room Service
- Rough or Smooth
- Ruckus in Dutchess
- RuPaul's Christmas Ball
- RuPaul's Drag Race
- RuPaul's Drag Race: All Stars
- RuPaul's Drag Race: Untucked!
- RuPaul's Drag U

== S ==
- The Sassy Scoop
- Savoir Faire
- Schitt's Creek
- The Secret Life of Us
- Sense Appeal
- Settle Down
- Setup Squad
- Sew Fierce
- Sex & Violence
- Sexplorations
- The Shaun Proulx Show
- She's Living for This
- Shine True
- Shout!
- Show Me the Monet
- Shunned
- Slayers: Wheel of Fate
- Slo Pitch
- Sloppy Jones
- So Gay TV
- So Graham Norton
- Southern Comfort
- Steven & Chris
- Straight Talk
- Stand Together
- Strip Search
- Studlebrity
- Sugar Rush
- Sunday Night at the Palladium
- The Switch

== T ==
- Tan Lines
- A Taste of Life
- Teen Angst
- This Is Drag
- Threesome
- Tina Turner Live in Holland
- Tipping the Velvet
- Tom Daley Goes Global
- A Totally Different Me
- Transgenders: Pakistan's Open Secret
- Two Fat Ladies

== U ==
- Under Covers
- Under the Pink Carpet
- Undercover Egypt
- Undressed
- Untucked: RuPaul's Drag Race
- Urban Fitness
- Urban Nites

== V ==
- Vancouver Pride Parade - Special Presentation 2013, 2014, 2015

== W ==
- WayOutWest.tv
- We're Funny That Way!
- What's for Dinner?
- The Whole Package
- Wigs in a Blanket
- Wild For The Weekend
- Wild Things
- Wisecrack
- World's Greenest Homes

== X ==
- X-Rated: NYC
- X-Rated: LA

== Y ==
- The Yorkshire Vet

== See also ==
- List of television shows with LGBT characters
