= Big Freedia discography =

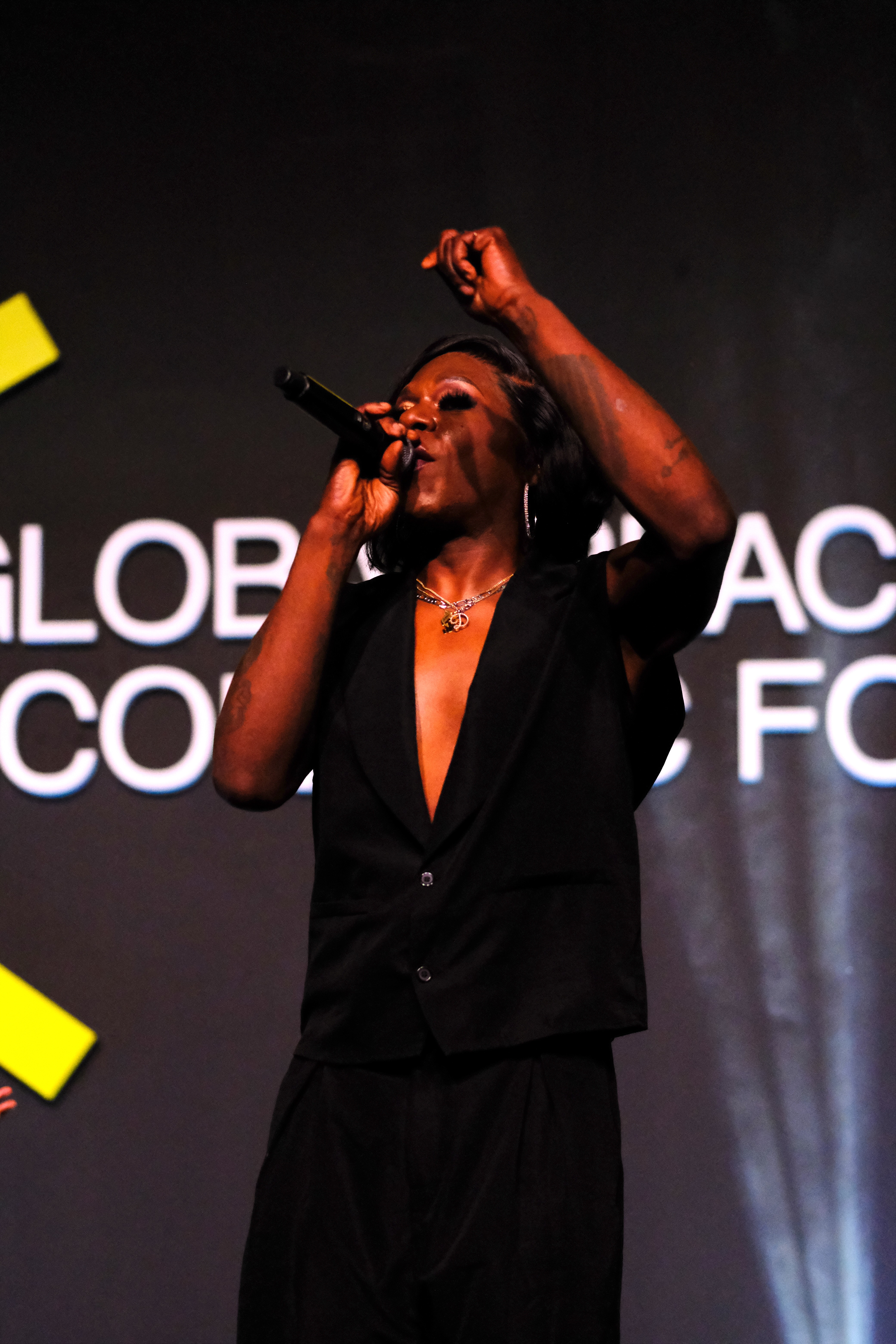
- Freedia performing at the Essence Festival of Culture in 2025
- Studio albums: 3
- EPs: 5
- Live albums: 1
- Singles: 36
- Music videos: 25
- Mixtapes: 3

The discography of American rapper Big Freedia consists of three studio albums, three mixtapes, five extended plays, and 36 singles (including 36 as a featured artist), and 25 music videos

== Studio albums ==
List of studio albums, with selected information
Title	Details	Peak chart positions	
Title	Details	US R&B/HH	US Heat
Just Be Free	Released: June 16, 2014; Label: Queen Diva; Formats: LP, CD, digital download, streaming	48	28
Central City	Released: June 23, 2023; Label: Queen Diva; Formats: Digital download, streaming	—	—
Pressing Onward	Released: August 8, 2025; Label: Queen Diva; Formats: LP, digital download, streaming	—	—

== Live albums ==
Title	Album details
Live at the Orpheum Theater (with Louisiana Philharmonic Orchestra)	Released: April 19, 2024; Label: Queen Diva; Formats: LP, digital download, streaming

== Mixtapes ==
Title	Album details
Queen Diva	Released: 2003; Label: Money Rules; Formats: CD
Big Freedia Hitz Vol. 1	Released: January 17, 2010; Label: Self-released; Formats: CD-R, digital download, streaming
The Bounce Back (with Mannie Fresh) (Note: This EP was released exclusively on SoundCloud.)	Released: 2017; Label: Self-released; Formats: Streaming

== Extended plays ==
Title	Album details
A Very Big Freedia Christmazz	Released: December 9, 2016; Label: Queen Diva; Formats: CD-R, digital download, streaming
3rd Ward Bounce	Released: June 1, 2018; Label: East West, Asylum; Formats: Digital download, streaming
Louder	Released: March 13, 2020; Label: East West; Formats: Digital download, streaming
Big Freedia's Smokin Santa Christmas	Released: December 11, 2020; Label: Queen Diva; Formats: Digital Download, streaming
Big Diva Energy	Released: September 17, 2021; Label: East West; Formats: Digital Download, streaming
Released at Last	Released: June 19, 2026

== Singles ==
=== As lead artist ===
Title	Year	Album
"An Ha, Oh Yeah"	1999	Non-album singles
"Booty-Whop"	2012	Non-album singles
"Explode"	2014	Just Be Free
"Ol' Lady"	2015	Just Be Free
"Crazy"	2015	Non-album singles
"I Heard"	2016	Non-album singles
"Dive" (featuring Mannie Fresh)	2017	Non-album singles
"Side Ho" (featuring Legendary M$.Tee)	2018	Non-album singles
"Good Times" (featuring Legendary M$.Tee)	2018	Non-album singles
"Best Beleevah"	2018	Non-album singles
"Rent"	2018	3rd Ward Bounce
"Poppin'" (with GotSome)	2019	Non-album single
"Bawdy" (with Dillon Francis and TV Noise)	2019	Magic is Real
"Louder" (featuring Icona Pop)	2019	Louder
"Still in Love" (with 504detroit and Freshxreckless)	2020	Non-album single
"Chasing Rainbows" (featuring Kesha)	2020	Louder
"Mm Mm Good"	2020	Big Diva Energy
"Better Be" (featuring Flo Milli)	2020	Big Freedia's Smokin Santa Christmas
"Platinum"	2021	Big Diva Energy
"Strut" (with Elohim)	2021	Journey to the Center of Myself, Vol. 1
"Judas"	2021	Born This Way The Tenth Anniversary
"Betty Bussit" (featuring Soaky Siren with Tank and the Bangas)	2021	Big Diva Energy
"Big" (with Tank and the Bangas)	2021	Red Balloon
"Tis the Season"	2021	Non-album single
"Deceptacon" (with Boyfriend)	2022	Sugar & Spice
"Drop a Bomb" (with Riotron)	2022	Non-album singles
"Cute Face" (with Brandon Mitchell 69)	2022	Non-album singles
"Central City Freestyle"	2023	Central City
"$100 Bill" (featuring Ciara)	2023	Central City
"Bigfoot"	2023	Central City
"El Niño" (featuring Lil Wayne and Boyfriend)	2023	Central City
"Pretty" (with Cimafunk)	2024	Pa' Tu Cuerpa
"I Am" (with Macy Gray)	2024	Non-album singles
"Let's Go!"	2024	Non-album singles
"Take My Hand"	2025	Pressing Onward
"Sunday Best" (featuring Tamar Braxton)	2025	Pressing Onward
"Church"	2025	Pressing Onward
"Holly Shuffle" (featuring Billy Porter)	2025	Pressing Onward

=== As featured artist ===
List of singles as featured artist, with selected chart positions and certifications, showing year released and album name
Title	Year	Peak chart positions									Album
Title	Year	US Bub.	US Digital	US R&B/ HH	US Pop	US Dance	CAN Dig	CAN Hot AC	IRE	UK DL.	Album
"Double It" (Galactic featuring Big Freedia)	2010	—	—	—	—	—	—	—	—	—	Ya-Ka-May
"Nasty" (Spank Rock featuring Big Freedia)	2011	—	—	—	—	—	—	—	—	—	Everything Is Boring and Everyone Is a F—ing Liar
"More Than Friends" (8-9 Boyz featuring Big Freedia, Kidd Kidd, Kango Slim)	2011	—	—	94	—	—	—	—	—	—	More Than Friends
"Peanut Butter" (RuPaul featuring Big Freedia)	2012	—	—	—	—	—	—	—	—	—	Essential, Vol. 2
"Freaky Money" (RuPaul featuring Big Freedia)	2014	—	—	—	—	—	—	—	—	—	Born Naked
"02 by Now Remix" (JUSTYRA featuring Big Freedia)	2015	—	—	—	—	—	—	—	—	—	Non-album single
"Drop" (Diplo & DJ Snake featuring Big Freedia)	2015	—	—	—	—	—	—	—	—	—	Entourage (Original Motion Picture Soundtrack)
"Club Now Skunk" (Elliphant featuring Big Freedia)	2015	—	—	—	—	—	—	—	—	—	Non-album single
"Jingle Dem Bells" (RuPaul, Ellis Miah featuring Big Freedia)	2015	—	—	—	—	—	—	—	—	—	Slay Belles
"Eye of the Needle (Bounce Remix)" (Sia featuring Big Freedia)	2015	—	—	—	—	—	—	—	—	—	Adult Swim Singles Program
"Calvary" (Wiwek featuring Big Freedia)	2016	—	—	—	—	—	—	—	—	—	The Free & Rebellious
"Marie Antoinette" (Boyfriend featuring Big Freedia)	2016	—	—	—	—	—	—	—	—	—	Non-album singles
"Stop, Drop, & Roll" (Mr. Ghetto featuring Big Freedia)	2018	—	—	—	—	—	—	—	—	—	Non-album singles
"Move Your Body (Remix)" (New Orleans Musicians' Clinic featuring Rebirth Brass Band & Big Freedia)	2018	—	—	—	—	—	—	—	—	—	Non-album singles
"Diamond Remix" (Flow Tribe featuring Big Freedia	2019	—	—	—	—	—	—	—	—	—	Non-album singles
"Go and Get It" (Salt Cathedral featuring Big Freedia & Jarina De Marco)	2019	—	—	—	—	—	—	—	—	—	Non-album singles
"Raising Hell" (Kesha featuring Big Freedia)	2019	17	19	—	24	5	45	36	97	64	High Road
"Dame Bien" (Mala Rodriguez and Guaynaa featuring Big Freedia)	2019	—	—	—	—	—	—	—	—	—	Mala
"House Party" (New Kids on the Block featuring Boyz II Men, Big Freedia, Naughty by Nature, and Jordin Sparks)	2020	—	15	—	—	—	19	—	—	96	Non-album single
"Feel Right" (7th Ward Shorty featuring Big Freedia)	2020	—	—	—	—	—	—	—	—	—	Big Shorty
"Last Dance" (PATT featuring Big Freedia)	2020	—	—	—	—	—	—	—	—	—	Non-album singles
"Best Thing" (Bounce Mix) (Inayah featuring Big Freedia)	2020	—	—	—	—	—	—	—	—	—	Non-album singles
"End of the Freak Show" (CocoRosie featuring Big Freedia, ANOHNI, Brooke Candy, and Cakes da Killa)	2020	—	—	—	—	—	—	—	—	—	Non-album singles
"Funky Christmas" (Too Many Zooz featuring Big Freedia)	2020	—	—	—	—	—	—	—	—	—	Non-album singles
"Friday (Remix)" (Rebecca Black featuring Dorian Electra, Big Freedia, and 3OH!3)	2021	—	—	—	—	—	—	—	—	—	Non-album singles
"Watchu Tryna Do?" (Bounce Mix) (Blaqnmild remix) (GiGi Vega featuring Big Freedia)	2021	—	—	—	—	—	—	—	—	—	Non-album singles
"Supa Sunday" (Brandon Mitchell 69 featuring Big Freedia)	2021	—	—	—	—	—	—	—	—	—	Non-album singles
"Big" (Tank and the Bangas featuring Big Freedia)	2021	—	—	—	—	—	—	—	—	—	Red Balloon
"That's Folks" (Mykki Blanco featuring Big Freedia)	2021	—	—	—	—	—	—	—	—	—	Broken Hearts and Beauty Sleep
"Stupid Boy" (Slayyyter featuring Big Freedia)	2021	—	—	—	—	—	—	—	—	—	Non-album singles
"Bounce It" (LaTheGoat featuring Big Freedia)	2021	—	—	—	—	—	—	—	—	—	Non-album singles
"Ella Baker Shaker" (Jonathan Lykes featuring Big Freedia)	2022	—	—	—	—	—	—	—	—	—	The Black Joy Experience Vol. 2: Comrade
"Take It Back" (Sweet Crude featuring Big Freedia)	2022	—	—	—	—	—	—	—	—	—	Non-album singles
"Best of M.E. (My Energy)" (AB$ featuring Big Freedia)	2022	—	—	—	—	—	—	—	—	—	Non-album singles
"Double Dribble" (MC Shakie featuring Big Freedia)	2022	—	—	—	—	—	—	—	—	—	Non-album singles
"Not Your Freak" (Maxine Jones featuring Big Freedia)	2022	—	—	—	—	—	—	—	—	—	Non-album singles
"Row Row Row Your Boat" (Remix) Gracie's Corner featuring Big Freedia)	2022	—	—	—	—	—	—	—	—	—	Gracie's Corner Kids Hits Vol. 5
"Skeletons" (Karl Denson featuring Big Freedia, GoodSex, and Red Giant Project)	2022	—	—	—	—	—	—	—	—	—	Non-album singles
"Wiggle in the Middle" (The Floozies featuring Big Freedia)	2022	—	—	—	—	—	—	—	—	—	Non-album singles
"Wiggle It" (Mura Masa, Kevin The Bear featuring Big Freedia)	2024	—	—	—	—	—	—	—	—	—	Non-album singles
"Bend It Over" (Lola Brooke, A Boogie wit da Hoodie featuring Big Freedia)	2024	—	—	—	—	—	—	—	—	—	Dennis Daughter (Deluxe)
"—" denotes releases that did not chart or were not released in that territory.

== Guest appearances ==
Title	Year	Other artist(s)	Album
"Stupid"	2002	Katey Red	P-Popper / Club Hopper (Greatest Hits *Plus New Songs* Volume 2)
"Double It"	2010	Galactic	Ya – Ka – May
"Encore: Double It (Live)"	2011	Galactic	The Other Side of Midnight: Live in New Orleans
"Cameras (Rusty Lazer & JJ Marshall Remix)"	2011	Matt and Kim	Cameras – EP
"Hammertime (Home Depot)"	2011	Monsta Wit Da Fade	Where My Shakers At? Vol. 1 (New Orleans Gutta Bounce)
"Pep Boys"	2011	Monsta Wit Da Fade	Where My Shakers At? Vol. 1 (New Orleans Gutta Bounce)
"Stupid"	2013	Katey Red	Katey's Hits
"River / White Socks & Drawers"	2013	Davell Crawford, Donald Harrison Jr., Dr. John	My Gift to You
"Sally Racket"	2013	Akron/Family	Son of Rogues Gallery: Pirate Ballads, Sea Songs & Chanteys
"Calvalry"	2016	Wiwek	The Free & Rebellious
"Make It Jingle"	2016	—N/a	Office Christmas Party Soundtrack
"Shake It for Free (Remix)"	2017	Chopslee	Needs More Triggerman, Vol. 1
"Go Back"	2017	Raspy	Needs More Triggerman, Vol. 1
"Fuck Yo Man Before"	2018	Legendary M$.Tee	Legendary M$.Tee Throw Backs
"Nice for What"	2018	Drake	Scorpion
"Greatest Place in the World"	2018	Shamarr Allen & The Underdawgs	True Orleans
"Double Dribble"	2018	MC Shakie	The Return
"Erky Derky"	2018	Jay Driggy	Beats for the Streetz
"A Commercial Break"	2018	Jay Driggy, Hasizzle	Beats for the Streetz
"Formation (Homecoming Live)"	2019	Beyoncé	Homecoming: The Live Album
"Livin' It Up"	2019	Dappa	The Paper Chase
"Shake It"	2019	Charli XCX, Cupcakke, Brooke Candy, Pabllo Vittar	Charli
"Good Time"	2019	The Soul Rebels, Denisia, Passport P	Poetry in Motion
"Be Thankful for What You've Got"	2020	Bjrnk, Lucky Daye	Global Citizen: Stand Up
"Goin' Looney"	2021	—N/a	Space Jam: A New Legacy (Original Motion Picture Soundtrack)
"Freedom" (Big Freedia Remix)	2021	Jon Batiste	We Are (The Deluxe Edition)
"Liberation House Anthem"	2022	Jonathan Lykes	The Black Joy Experience Vol. 2: Comrade
"Break My Soul"	2022	Beyoncé	Renaissance
"Act Like You Know"	2022	Dee-1, Mannie Fresh, Galactic	Take Me to the River: New Orleans (Music from the Documentary Film)
"Rush" (Big Freedia Remix)	2023	Troye Sivan	Rush (Remixes)
"Winning"	2023	Ciara	CiCi EP and CiCi

== Music videos ==
Title	Year	Director
"Excuse"	2011	Unknown
"Na Who Mad"	2011	Renee Moncada McElroy and Beto "Mooncricket" Lopez
"Feeling Myself"	2013	David Fine and Renee Moncada McElroy
"Duffy"	2013	Unknown
"Y'all Get Back Now"	2013	Josh Ente and Bob Weisz
"Explode"	2014	Jon Jon Augustavo
"Mo Azz"	2014	Zambia
"Dangerous"	2015	Wilberto Lucci
"Crazy"	2016	Unknown
"Drop" (with Diplo and DJ Snake)	2016	Wilberto Lucci
"Make It Jingle"	2016	Unknown
"Dive" (featuring Mannie Fresh)	2017	Unknown
"Rent"	2018	Zac Manuel and Chris Haney
"Karaoke" (featuring Lizzo)	2019	Zac Manuel and Chris Haney
"Louder" (featuring Icona Pop)	2019	Unknown
"Chasing Rainbows" (featuring Kesha)	2020	Jonah Lincoln Best and Lagan Sebert
"Rona Rona"	2020	Unknown
"Better Be" (featuring Flo Milli)	2020	Skyler Stroup
"Betty Bussit" (featuring Soaky Siren and Tank and The Bangas)	2021	Skyler Stroup
"Not Today" (featuring Jake Shears and Anjelika "Jelly" Joseph)	2021	Matthew Wilder
"BDE" (featuring Jax)	2021	Alex P. Willson
"Ella Baker Shaker" (with Jonathan Lykes)	2022	Jason R.A. Foster
"I Heard"	2022	Wilberto Lucci
"Liberation House Anthem" (with Jonathan Lykes)	2022	Jason R.A. Foster
"Re: Drop/Shake Ya Body" (with Diplo, DJ Snake, & Blaqnmild)	2022	Wilberto Lucci
