= Craig Ranch =

Craig Ranch may refer to:

- Craig Ranch Regional Park, a regional park in North Las Vegas, Nevada, United States
- Craig Ranch Station, a cancelled hotel and casino in North Las Vegas, Nevada, United States
- TPC Craig Ranch, a private golf club in McKinney, Texas, United States

== See also ==
- Craig (disambiguation)
