= Fighting Oligarchy tour =

2025–26 series of American political rallies

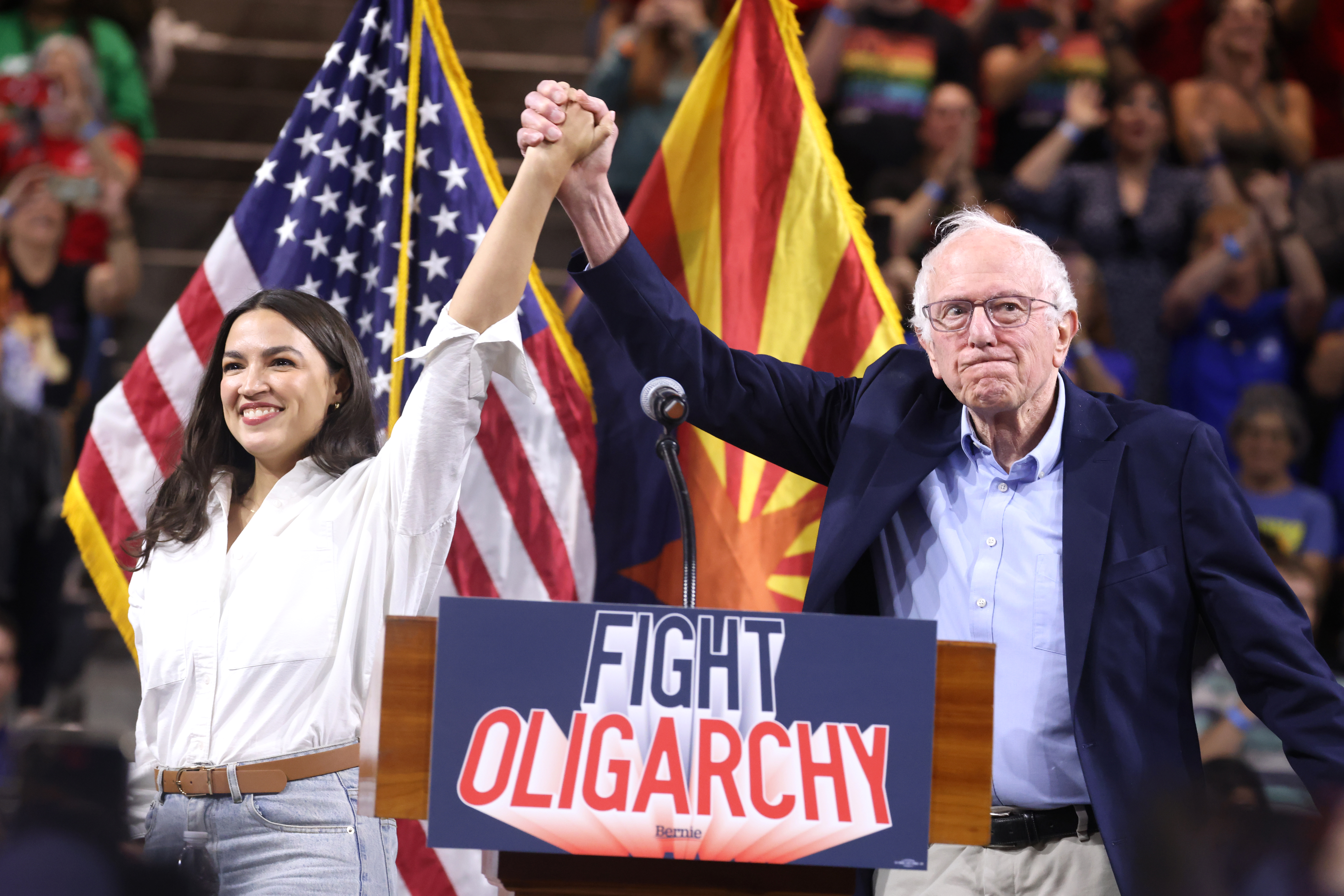
- Alexandria Ocasio-Cortez (left) and Bernie Sanders (right) on the tour at Mullett Arena in Tempe, Arizona
- Date: February 22, 2025 – present
- Location: United States
- Type: Political rally tour
- Cause: Opposition to oligarchy and corporate influence in politics
- Website: berniesanders.com/fighting-oligarchy-tour

The Fighting Oligarchy Tour, sometimes subtitled Where We Go from Here, is a series of American political rallies led by independent (Note: Caucuses with the Democratic Party) U.S. senator Bernie Sanders and Democratic U.S. representative Alexandria Ocasio-Cortez.

It began on February 21, 2025, in Omaha, Nebraska, with the stated goal to oppose oligarchy and the influence of billionaires and big corporations in U.S. politics. A segment covering the western U.S. began on March 20 in Las Vegas, Nevada. 34,000 people attended a March 21 rally in Denver, Colorado, bigger than any event held by the Democratic Party at the time, and with a bigger audience than any during Sanders's two presidential campaigns. This was followed by a crowd of 36,000 in Los Angeles, California, on April 12. The tour has featured speeches, musical performances, and efforts to promote policies such as universal healthcare and wealth taxation.

== Background ==
Sanders launched the tour after Donald Trump's reelection in November 2024, which Sanders cited as evidence of growing corporate influence in governance. Joined by Ocasio-Cortez and other progressive figures, Sanders aimed to address economic inequality and political power dynamics.

== Themes and messaging ==
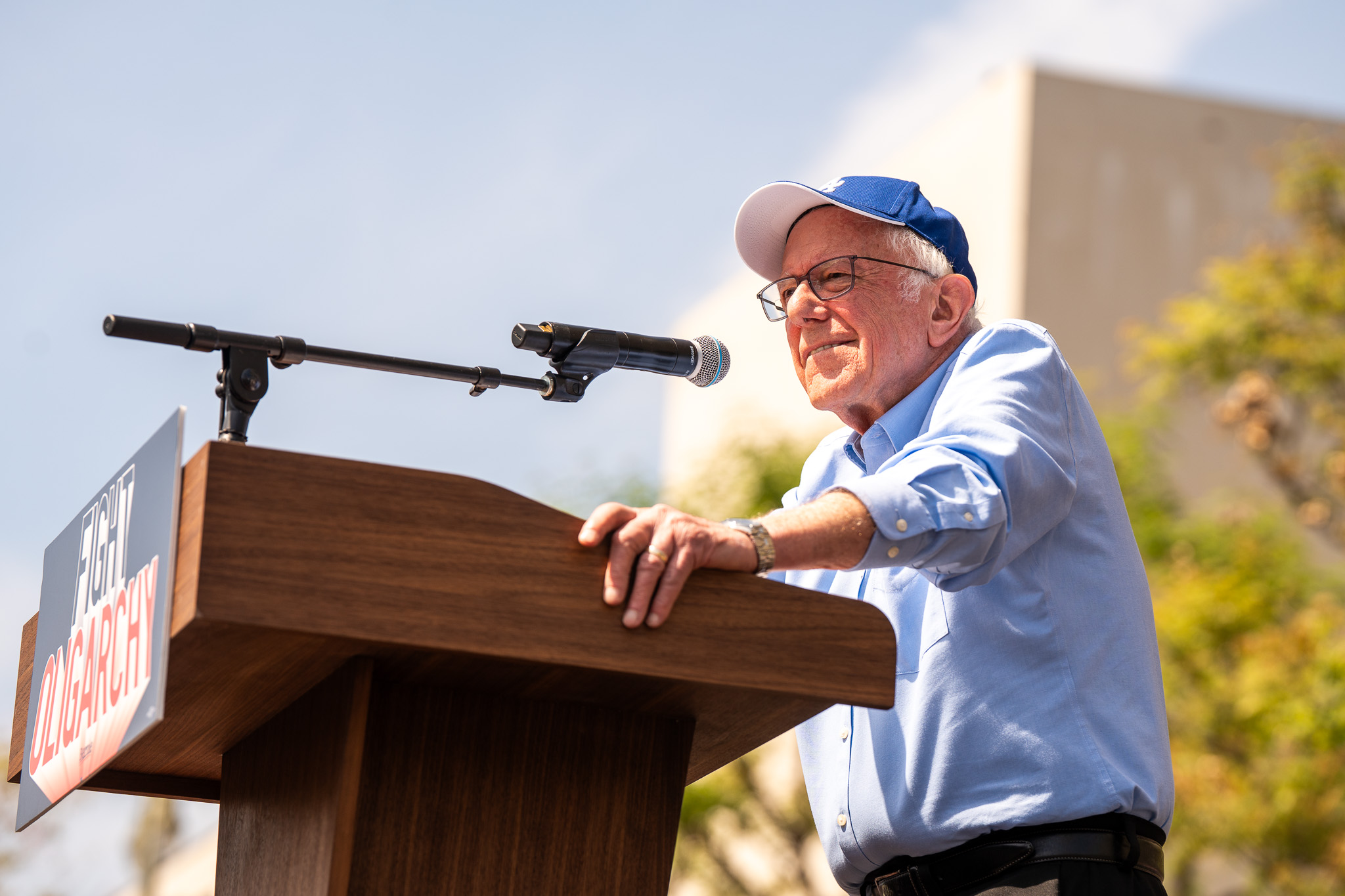
Senator Bernie Sanders speaking at LA Fighting Oligarchy Tour rally

The tour focuses on opposition to oligarchy, characterized as a system where a small, wealthy elite holds significant sway over political and economic matters. Speakers address topics such as income disparity, corporate lobbying, and democratic integrity, advocating reforms including Medicare for All, a wealth tax, and changes to campaign finance laws. The events also encourage grassroots participation in local and electoral efforts. Other goals include transforming the Democratic Party to bring it closer to its "FDR-era roots" in an effort to make it more popular, and pressuring Republican lawmakers in battleground districts to reject Republican fiscal plans such as cuts to Medicaid and tax cuts for the wealthy.

== Tour stops ==
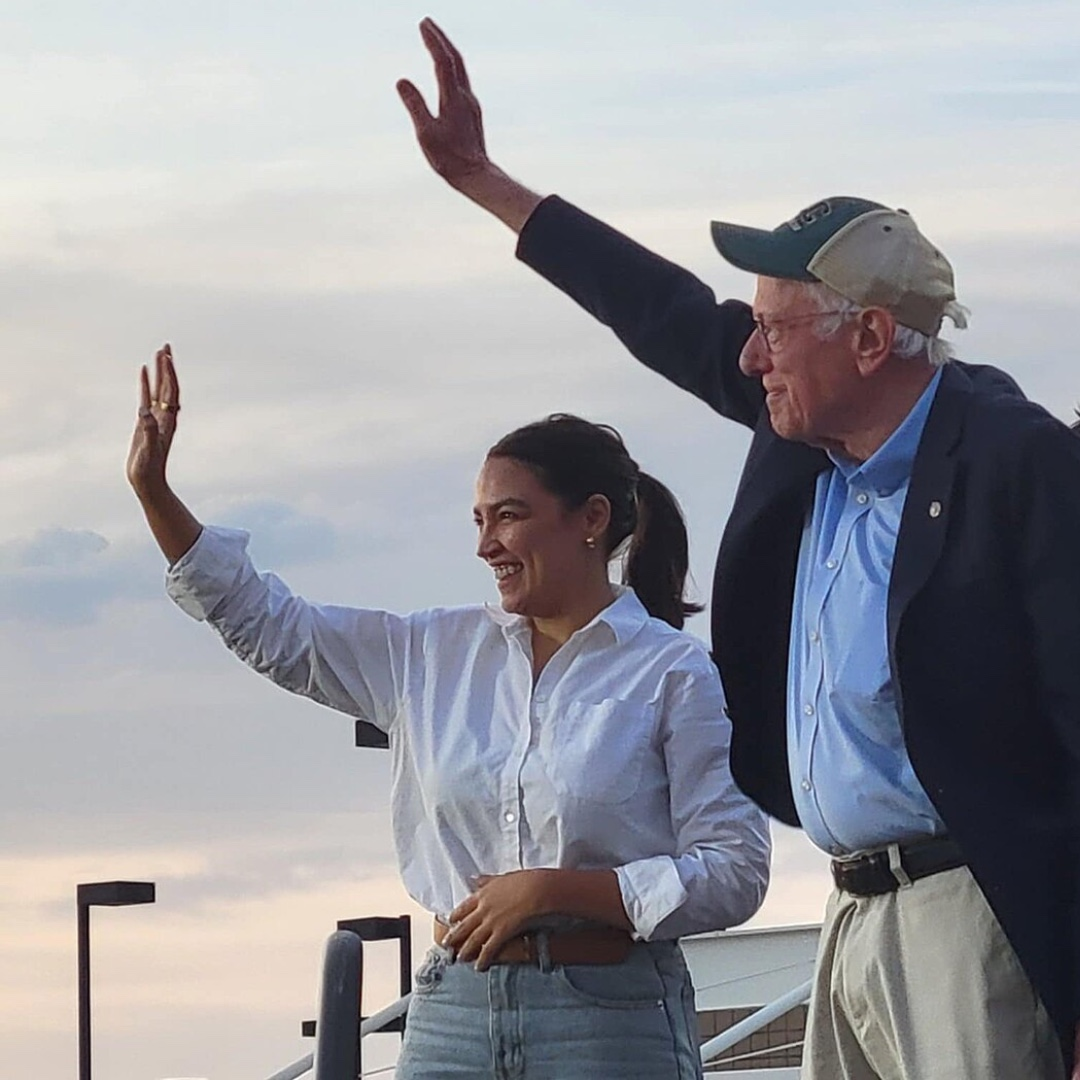
Alexandria Ocasio-Cortez and Bernie Sanders waving to the audience in Folsom, California, on April 15, 2025

| Date | City | Venue | Featured guests | Attendees |
|---|---|---|---|---|
| February 21, 2025 | Omaha, Nebraska | Omaha Marriott Downtown at the Capitol District | The Get Up Kids | 2,500 |
| February 22, 2025 | Iowa City, Iowa | The Englert Theatre | Elizabeth Moen | 800 |
| March 7, 2025 | Kenosha, Wisconsin | University of Wisconsin–Parkside | Laura Jane Grace; Kinsella & Pulse LLC | 4,000 |
| March 8, 2025 | Altoona, Wisconsin | Altoona High School | Poliça | 2,600 |
| March 8, 2025 | Warren, Michigan | Lincoln High School | The Armed | 9,000 |
| March 20, 2025 | North Las Vegas, Nevada | Craig Ranch Regional Park | Las Vegas High School Mariachi Band; Steven Horsford | 1,000 |
| March 20, 2025 | Tempe, Arizona | Mullett Arena | Calexico | 10,000 |
| March 21, 2025 | Greeley, Colorado | University of Northern Colorado | Rootbeer Richie & the Reveille | 11,000 |
| March 21, 2025 | Denver, Colorado | Civic Center Park | Freedom Singers; Xiuhtezcatl | 34,000 |
| March 22, 2025 | Tucson, Arizona | Catalina High School | Calexico | 20,000 |
| April 12, 2025 | Los Angeles, California | Grand Park | Neil Young; Jeff Rosenstock; Dirty Projectors; Indigo De Souza; The Red Pears; Raise Gospel Choir | 36,000 |
| April 13, 2025 | Salt Lake City, Utah | Jon M. Huntsman Center | Talia Keys; I Dont Know How but They Found Me | 20,000 |
| April 14, 2025 | Nampa, Idaho | Ford Idaho Center | Built to Spill | 12,500 |
| April 15, 2025 | Folsom, California | Folsom Lake College | Dogpatch; The Philharmonik | 26,000 |
| April 15, 2025 | Bakersfield, California | Dignity Health Arena | Miya Folick | 4,500 |
| April 16, 2025 | Missoula, Montana | Adams Center | Comic Sans | 9,100 |
| May 1, 2025 | Philadelphia, Pennsylvania | Philadelphia City Hall | | 5,000 |
| May 2, 2025 | Harrisburg, Pennsylvania | Pennsylvania Farm Show Complex & Expo Center | Chris Deluzio | 3,000 |
| May 3, 2025 | Bethlehem, Pennsylvania | Lehigh University | Augusta Koch; The Menzingers | 5,000 |
| June 20, 2025 | McAllen, Texas | McAllen Performing Arts Center | Lunar Heart; El Dusty | 1,600 |
| June 21, 2025 | Shreveport, Louisiana | Shreveport Municipal Auditorium | Sweet Crude | 1,800 |
| June 21, 2025 | Tulsa, Oklahoma | Arvest Convention Center | Parker Millsap; The Get Up Kids | 5,500 |
| June 22, 2025 | Amarillo, Texas | Globe-News Center for the Performing Arts | Guy Forsyth | 1,300 |
| June 22, 2025 | Fort Worth, Texas | Dickies Arena | MSB Choir; Old 97's | 6,500 |
| August 8, 2025 | Wheeling, West Virginia | Capitol Theatre | | 3,000 |
| August 9, 2025 | Lenore, West Virginia | Lenore Community Center | | 400 |
| August 9, 2025 | Charleston, West Virginia | Charleston Coliseum & Convention Center | | 3,000 |
| August 10, 2025 | Greensboro, North Carolina | Steven Tanger Center for the Performing Arts | | 3,000 |
| August 10, 2025 | Asheville, North Carolina | ExploreAsheville.com Arena | Sylvan Esso | 3,600 |
| August 22, 2025 | Davenport, Iowa | Davenport RiverCenter | Ratboys | 1,500 |
| August 23, 2025 | Viroqua, Wisconsin | Pierce Hill Performing Arts | Foreign Fields | 600 |
| August 23, 2025 | Kalamazoo, Michigan | Miller Auditorium | Rodeo Boys | 2,000 |
| August 24, 2025 | Chicago, Illinois | UIC Dorin Forum | Fruit Bats; Whitney | 3,000 |
| September 1, 2025 | Portland, Maine | Cross Insurance Arena | Troy Jackson; Graham Platner; Josh Ritter | 6,500 |
| September 6, 2025 | New York City, New York | Brooklyn College, Sanders' alma mater | Zohran Mamdani | 1,800 |
| January 19, 2026 | Wayne, New Jersey | William Paterson University | Analilia Mejia | 1,200 |
| February 12, 2026 | Greensboro, North Carolina | Carolina Theatre of Greensboro | Carmen Rojas | 1,000 |
| February 13, 2026 | Durham, North Carolina | Durham Convention Center | Nida Allam | 1,000 |
| May 1, 2026 | Parma Heights, Ohio | Valley Forge High School | Brian Poindexter; Chris Deluzio | TBD |
| May 2, 2026 | Rochester, Minnesota | John Marshall High School | Peggy Flanagan; Keith Ellison | 1,300 |
| May 3, 2026 | Detroit, Michigan | Mumford High School | Abdul El-Sayed | 1,360 |
| May 24, 2026 | Orono, Maine | Collins Center for the Arts | Graham Platner; Troy Jackson | 1,400 |
| May 25, 2026 | Portland, Maine | Brick South at Thompson's Point | Graham Platner; Troy Jackson | 1,700 |
| October 4, 2026 | Bakersfield, California | Bakersfield High School | Randy Villegas | TBD |
| October 17, 2026 | Tampa | Circulo Cubano de Tampa | Angie Nixon | TBD |
| October 17, 2026 | Melbourne | Crowne Plaza Melbourne Oceanfront | Angie Nixon | TBD |
| October 18, 2026 | Gainesville | University Auditorium | Angie Nixon | TBD |
| October 18, 2026 | Tallahassee | The Moon | Angie Nixon | TBD |
| October 19, 2026 | Amarillo, Texas | Amarillo Civic Center | | TBD |
| October 19, 2026 | El Paso, Texas | Abraham Chavez Theatre | Greg Casar, Beto O'Rourke | TBD |
| October 20, 2026 | Houston, Texas | Wheeler Avenue Baptist Church | Greg Casar, Beto O'Rourke | TBD |
| October 26, 2026 | Alpena, Michigan | The Aplex | | TBD |

=== Coachella 2025 appearance ===
On April 12, 2025, Sanders appeared on the Outdoor Stage at Coachella 2025 to introduce Clairo to a crowd of 36,000 people.

== Music ==
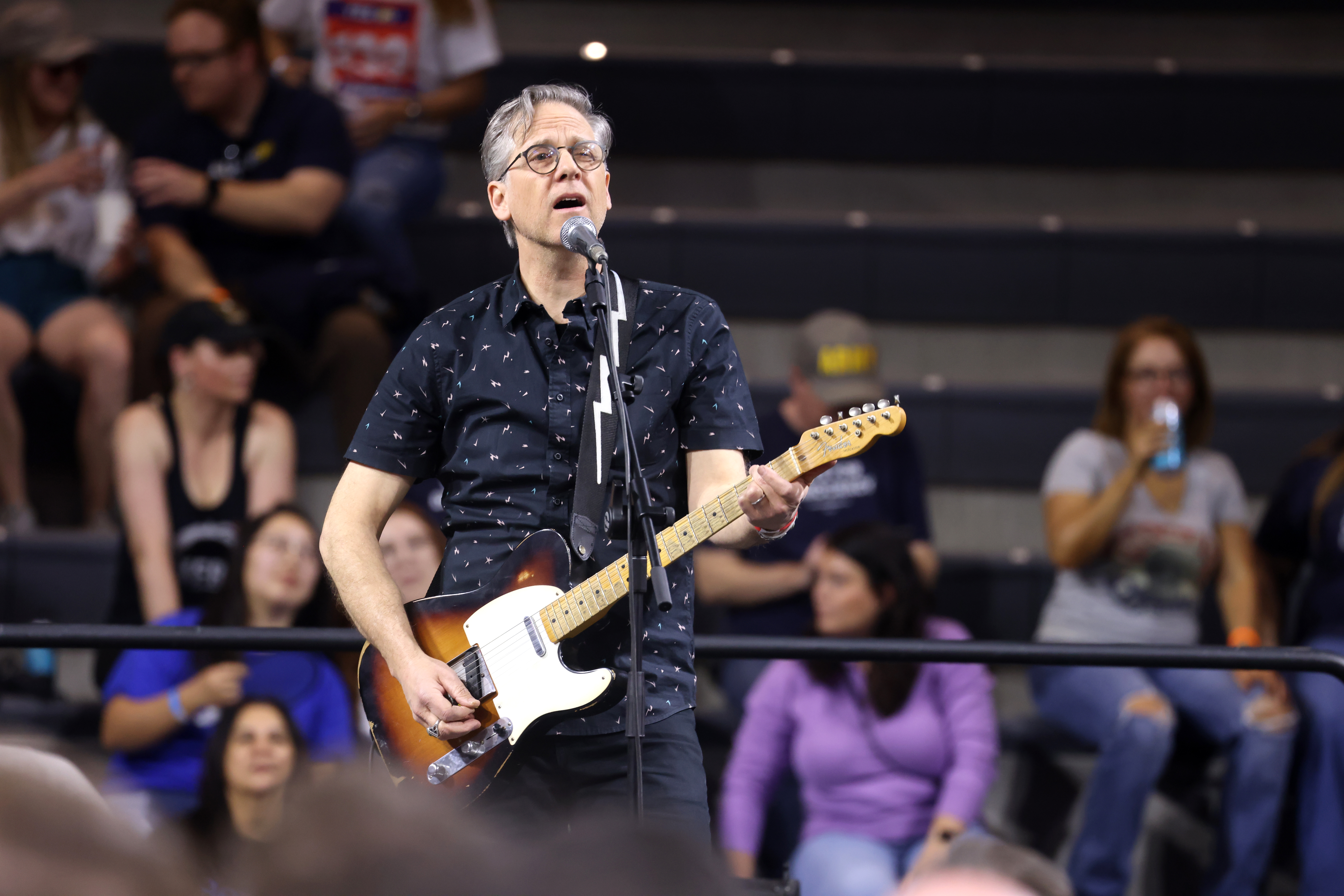
Joey Burns of rock band Calexico performed at the Tempe rally on March 20, 2025

Musical performances have accompanied many of the tour's rallies. Laura Jane Grace and duo Kinsella & Pulse LLC performed at the March 7 event in Kenosha, Wisconsin, and Poliça opened for the March 8 event in Altoona. During the March 8 rally in Warren, Michigan, hardcore punk band the Armed performed, beginning their set with a cover of the Stooges' "Search And Destroy". Indie rock band Calexico introduced the March 22 event in Tucson. Neil Young took the stage during the April 12 rally in Los Angeles, which also featured performances by Jeff Rosenstock, Dirty Projectors, Indigo De Souza, the Red Pears, and Raise Gospel Choir. Young led a "Take America Back" chant, then played his song "Rainbow of Colors" and a solo rendition of "Rockin' in the Free World" on electric guitar, accompanied by Joan Baez and Maggie Rogers. Talia Keys and I Dont Know How but They Found Me played at the April 13 Salt Lake City rally.

For his walk-on song, Sanders uses John Lennon's "Power to the People", as he did in his presidential campaigns of 2016 and 2020.

== Reception ==
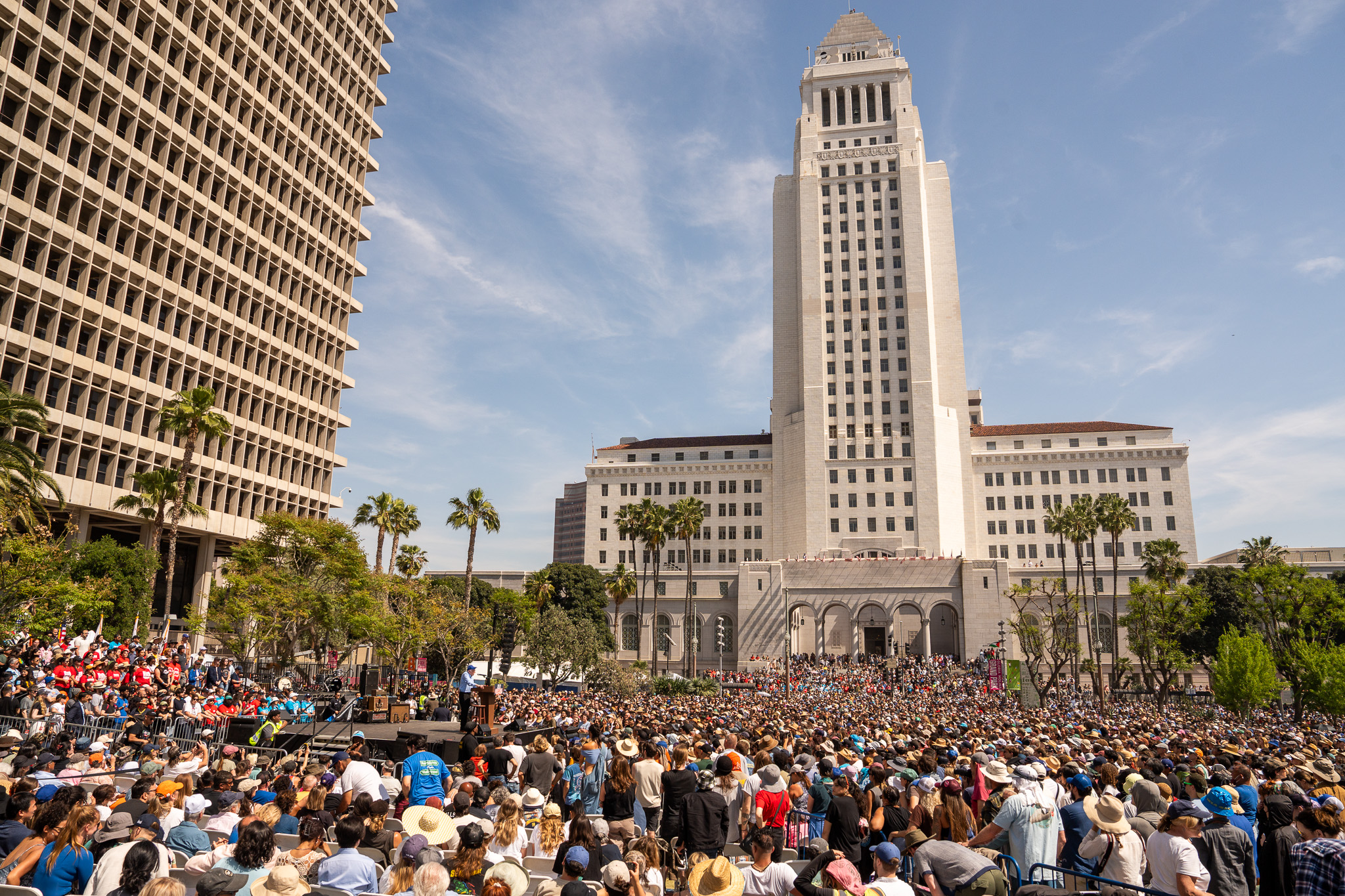
Crowd gathered outside Los Angeles City Hall for the April 12, 2025, Fighting Oligarchy Tour rally, the largest event of the tour.

As of April 12, 2025, the tour had drawn over 107,000 attendees across various states. According to the ongoing chart of rallies in this article, as of November 17, 2025 the tour has drawn 261,100 attendees. On March 26, Politico reported that the Fighting Oligarchy rallies were "bigger than any other events currently being held by Democrats" and that they were acting as a "revival" for progressives. Sanders said that two-thirds of those who registered to attend the events had never gone to see him or donated to him before. The crowd at the Denver rally was larger than at any event during his 2016 and 2020 presidential runs. These numbers contrasted with low approval ratings for the Democratic Party.

The tour facilitated grassroots organizing, including volunteer recruitment and support for progressive candidates. Progressives supported the tour for engaging supporters and focusing on corporate influence, while media outlets, including The New York Times, observed similarities to historical protest movements such as Occupy Wall Street.

Some members of the Democratic establishment supported the rallies, including some who had previously criticized Sanders; a vice chair of the Democratic National Committee, Malcolm Kenyatta, said: "This is not left versus right. This is about flight versus fight." Kenyatta had criticized Sanders in the past.

On May 7, 2025, Fox News host Bret Baier asked Sanders about an April 17, 2025, Washington Free Beacon article that said that Sanders's campaign committee had used $221,723 in expenditures in the first quarter of 2025 to charter private jets. Sanders replied that when doing multiple rallies per week, "the only way you can get around" in a timely enough manner is by chartering private jets.
