= Crossing the Line (2002 film) =

- Genre: Sports comedy-drama
- Written by: Susanna Styron; Bridget Terry
- Directed by: Graeme Clifford
- Starring: Terry Farrell; Adrian Pasdar; Sumela Kay; Sherry Miller; Barry Flatman; Lawrence Dane
- Music by: Charles Bernstein
- Country of origin: United States
- Original language: English

Production
- Executive producer: Robert Kline
- Producer: Terry Gould
- Production location: Toronto
- Cinematography: Rhett Morita
- Editor: Scot J. Kelly
- Running time: 92 minutes
- Production companies: Robert Kline Productions; Medeacom Productions; Hearst Entertainment

Original release
- Network: Lifetime
- Release: July 15, 2002

Crossing the Line is a 2002 American sports comedy-drama film directed by Graeme Clifford, written by Susanna Styron and Bridget Terry, and starring Terry Farrell, Adrian Pasdar, Sumela Kay, Sherry Miller, Barry Flatman, and Lawrence Dane. The film is about a girls' high school basketball team, and explores what happens when parents go too far in pushing their children.

Crossing the Line aired on Lifetime on July 15, 2002.

== Synopsis ==
A former All-American basketball player lands a job as assistant coach for a three-time championship girls' high school basketball team. After the head coach has a heart attack, she takes over and clashes with several parents who push their daughters to win at all costs.

== Cast ==
- Terry Farrell as Laura Mosbach
- Adrian Pasdar as Eric Harrison
- Sumela Kay as Carly Harrison
- Sherry Miller as Jennifer Blackstone
- Barry Flatman as Jerry Blackstone
- Lawrence Dane as Coach Tom Holliday
- Josh Buckle as Zack Mosbach
- Amy Rutherford as Danielle Blackstone
- Courtney Hawkrigg as Sheryl Baines
- Courtenay Betts as Amy Fulton
- Serena Lee as Marcy Houston
- Jamie Robinson as Reggie Williams
- Taylor Abrahamse as Robert Blackstone
- Bill Lake as Joe Fulton
- Phillip Jarrett as Coach Davidson
- Michael Falloon as Streetsville Referee
- Beverly Cooper as Pam Baines (as Beverley Cooper)
- Ron Gabriel as Eric's Lawyer
- Mishu Vellani as Prosecutor
- David Clement as Judge
- Tony Meyler as School Board Member
- Ola Sturik as TV Sportscaster
- Kathryn Long as Tiger Captain

== Production ==
Filming took place on location in Toronto.

== See also ==
- List of basketball films
