= Space Jam: A New Legacy (soundtrack) =

2021 soundtrack albums

Space Jam: A New Legacy (Original Motion Picture Soundtrack)

Soundtrack album by various artists
- Released: July 9, 2021
- Genres: Pop; R&B; hip hop
- Length: 47:41
- Labels: Republic; WaterTower
- Producers: Various: Just Blaze; Kirk Franklin; Marshmello; Omer Fedi; Blake Slatkin; Danny Couture; Oak Felder; Zaire Koalo; Smoko Ono; Johnny Goldstein; Robert Elijah Fairfax III; BNYX; Terrell "Finesse" Greenlee; Amin "Mean" Warren; Pat Morrissey; Ryan Tedder; Marty Maro; Mike Elizondo; Jason Evigan; The Monsters & Strangerz; Gian Stone; Tasha Catour; Blaise Railey; Ludwig Göransson; P-Lo; Ngawang Samphel; Cadenza; Jabari Manwa; Video Store; Zac Carper; Ricky Reed; Boyfriend; Gold Glove; Juicebox Slim; Jonas Jeberg; Joshua Block; MarcLo; Imad Royal; Railey; DJ Stanfill; Will Wells

Singles from Space Jam: A New Legacy (Original Motion Picture Soundtrack)
- 1. "We Win" Released: May 19, 2021; 2. "Just for Me" Released: June 11, 2021

Space Jam: A New Legacy (Score from the Original Motion Picture Soundtrack)

Film score by Kris Bowers
- Released: July 16, 2021
- Recorded: April 2021
- Genres: Pop; hip hop; jazz
- Length: 1:08:05
- Label: WaterTower
- Producer: Kris Bowers

Kris Bowers chronology
The United States vs. Billie Holiday (2021)	Space Jam: A New Legacy (2021)	Respect (2021)

Space Jam: A New Legacy (Original Motion Picture Soundtrack) is the soundtrack album to the 2021 live-action/animated sports comedy film Space Jam: A New Legacy produced by Warner Animation Group and distributed by Warner Bros. Pictures. It was released on July 9, 2021, by Republic Records and WaterTower Music. It featured various artists performing on the album, including Lil Baby, Kirk Franklin, Saint Jhn, SZA, John Legend, Lil Wayne, Saweetie, Jonas Brothers, 24kGoldn, Lil Uzi Vert, Chance the Rapper, Joyner Lucas, Big Freedia, G-Eazy, and Kash Doll.

Two lead singles were released, prior to the soundtrack, for promotional purposes. Lil Baby and Franklin's "We Win" was released as the first track on May 19, 2021, and its music video was released two months later, on July 28 (after the film's release). The video featured Baby and Franklin, while snippets from the film were also played. The song upon release was streamed by over 4.5 million listeners as of mid-June. Jhn and SZA's song "Just for Me" was released as the second single from the album on June 11.

The film's score is composed by Kris Bowers, who replaced Hans Zimmer as the composer in January 2021. WaterTower Music released the original score album on July 16, 2021, coinciding with the film's theatrical and premium video-on-demand streaming release via HBO Max.

== Background ==
Kier Lehman and Morgan Rhodes served as the music supervisors. They wanted "songs that were fun as we ushered in a new generation, that would help move the excitement as the game moves to give a nod to what came before", which resulted in a soundtrack featuring prominent artists. Speaking to Variety, both Rhodes and Lehman said "We both loved the original soundtrack, but I don't know that we necessarily felt pressure. We were just so excited to continue what had been started. Music has changed, but we have an opportunity to showcase the natural sound of music, as well as bringing in artists who were on the first soundtrack."

In an interview to Billboard, Spencer Beighley, head of film at SpringHill stated that the film's music was consistent over the scripting process, as "When you think about the original soundtrack, it's such a melting pot [...] You have Quad City DJ's, you have a Steve Miller Band cover, you have a six-minute D'Angelo track, and it transcended the movie, in a way. So we knew that with the soundtrack for this one, that whole idea of making a soundtrack for this generation, but still having that melting pot, was something we all really wanted." Republic Records A&R representative, Sammie Taylor, wanted a "cross generational soundtrack that appeals for all ages, similar to the first film soundtrack", which she confessed it as the "hardest part". Salt-N-Pepa, which recorded "Upside Down ('Round-N-'Round)" for the first film, collaborated with Saweetie and Kash Doll for the track "Hoops", thereby becoming the first artist to feature on both soundtracks.

== Track listing ==
Space Jam: A New Legacy (Original Motion Picture Soundtrack) track listing
No.	Title	Writer(s)	Producer(s)	Length
1.	"We Win" (Lil Baby and Kirk Franklin)	Justin Smith; Kirk Franklin; Dominique Jones; Cynthia Nunn	Just Blaze; Kirk Franklin	3:15
2.	"Control the World" (24kGoldn featuring Lil Wayne)	Dwayne Carter; Omer Fedi; Blake Slatkin; Danny Couture; Golden Landis von Jones	Marshmello; Fedi; Slatkin; Couture	2:16
3.	"See Me Fly" (Chance the Rapper featuring John Legend and Symba)	Warren "Oak" Felder; John Roger Stephens; Chancelor Bennett; Demario Driver; Darian Joshua Garcia	Oak Felder; Zaire Koalo; Smoko Ono	2:23
4.	"Hoops" (Saweetie featuring Salt-N-Pepa and Kash Doll)	Cheryl James; Jim Lavigne; Sandra Denton; Madison Love; Johnny Goldstein; Demario Driver; Cole Basta; Diamonté Harper; Mary Ann Daugherty	Goldstein	2:42
5.	"Pump Up the Jam" (Lil Uzi Vert)	Manuela Kamosi; Thomas de Quincey	Robert Elijah Fairfax III; BNYX; Terrell "Finesse" Greenlee; Amin "Mean" Warren	2:15
6.	"Just for Me" (Saint Jhn featuring SZA)	Pat Morrissey; Carlos St. John Phillips; Ryn Weaver; Solana Rowe; Levi Lennox Malundama	Morrissey	3:37
7.	"Crowd Go Crazy" (John Legend)	Ryan Tedder; Ali Tamposi; Stephens; Marty Maro	Tedder; Maro	3:00
8.	"Mercy" (Jonas Brothers)	Mike Elizondo; Jason Evigan; Kevin Jonas; Nick Jonas; Stefan Johnson; Sean Douglas; Amy Wadge; Casey Smith; Jordan K. Johnson	Elizondo; Evigan; The Monsters & Strangerz; Gian Stone	3:01
9.	"Gametime" (Lil Tecca and Aminé)	Jason Mizell; Tyrone Taylor; Aminé; Kirk Jones; Fred Scruggs; Chylow Parker; Latasha Williams; Blaise Railey; Lil Tecca	Tasha Catour; Railey	3:11
10.	"About That Time" (Dame D.O.L.L.A., G-Eazy, P-Lo and White Dave)	Jonathan Smith; Harry Palmer; James Moore; Lawrence Smith; Russell Simmons; Todd Anthony Shaw; Ludwig Göransson; Robert Arthur Ford; Paulo Rodriguez; Gerald Earl Gillum; White Dave; Damian Lillard; Ngawang Samphel	Göransson; P-Lo; Samphel	3:11
11.	"MVP" (Brockhampton)	Ian Simpson; William Wood; Oliver Rodigan; Russell Boring; Romil Hemnani; Matthew Champion; Dominique Simpson; Jabari Manwarring	Cadenza; Jabari Manwa; Video Store	2:51
12.	"Settle the Score" (Cordae and Duckwrth)	Eric Frederic; Zac Carper; Kameron Glasper; Jared Lee; Wynne Bennett; Tayla Parx; Cordae	Carper; Ricky Reed	2:29
13.	"Goin' Looney" (Big Freedia)	Freddie Ross; Miles Comaskey; Suzannah Powell; Ryan Chavez; Owen J. Hobson	Boyfriend; Gold Glove	3:40
14.	"Shoot My Shot" (Joyner Lucas)	Gary Lucas; Juicebox Slim	Juicebox Slim	3:22
15.	"My Guy" (Leon Bridges)	Jonas Jeberg; Marcus Lomax; Alexander Izquierdo	Jeberg; Joshua Block; MarcLo	3:20
16.	"The Best" (Anthony Ramos)	Anthony Ramos; Imad Royal; Railey; Andrew Neely; DJ Stanfill	Royal; Railey; DJ Stanfill; Will Wells	3:01

Space Jam: A New Legacy (Original Motion Picture Score) track listing
No.	Title	Length
1.	"A New Legacy"	0:41
2.	"Look at His Likes"	2:39
3.	"The Warner 3000"	1:14
4.	"Get a New Algorithm"	1:33
5.	"That's Not What I Want"	1:34
6.	"Into the Serververse"	2:13
7.	"Are All Computers Like This?"	4:15
8.	"Meeting Bugs Bunny"	6:38
9.	"The Dream Team"	1:55
10.	"Not the Team I Asked For"	2:24
11.	"The Basics"	1:56
12.	"Turn Up Down"	2:50
13.	"Time For an Upgrade"	3:40
14.	"Start Game"	3:20
15.	"Serververse Grade"	3:56
16.	"Chronos"	2:32
17.	"Michael "B" Jordan"	2:39
18.	"Let's Go Tunes"	5:16
19.	"I Am the Game"	4:27
20.	"Sic' Em Goons"	1:36
21.	"The Step-Back Glitch"	2:29
22.	"The Final Play"	1:02
23.	"Posterized"	2:01
24.	"That's All Folks"	2:22
25.	"Back To Reality / The Merry Go Round Broke Down"	2:53

== Additional music ==
2 Unlimited's "Get Ready for This", one of the songs from the first film, is briefly heard in one scene with Al-G and Dom. "Sirius", an instrumental song by Alan Parsons Project that serves as the entrance anthem for the Chicago Bulls, is heard briefly when Sylvester brings out Michael B. Jordan to the Tune Squad, who believe that its the basketball player Michael Jordan even though he isn't.

== Reception ==
Space Jam: A New Legacy (Original Motion Picture Soundtrack) ratings
Review scores
Source	Rating
Pitchfork	2.3/10
Rolling Stone	1.5/5 stars

Like the movie itself, the soundtrack also received a negative response from critics. Pitchfork's Alphonse Pierre called the soundtrack as "soulless and gratuitous" as the film and gave 2.3/10 to the album. Rolling Stone-based Jayson Buford gave one-and-a-half out of five, wrote "Nobody who writes about this soundtrack wants it to be bad, but something for kids shouldn't be this manufactured. The messages in pop culture for kids can inform a new generation and create memories that are passed down to the next generations. Or, it can just be plain old fun. Instead, this movie is stale and the soundtrack is worse." The Ringer's Justin Charity stated "The sequel was always going to be craven and stupid. But the musicians might have once again seized the opportunity to help make this children's movie feel bigger than it ought to be. Yet the movie and the soundtrack both feel small, and the latter almost sounds determined to be forgotten by all but the algorithm as soon as it's possible." Soul In Stereo, in a positive note, wrote "Like the film its promotes, his soundtrack too often feels like a nostalgic cash in, and most of the artists here don't seem all that interested themselves. but a soundtrack promoting a kids movie – us old heads may be bored to tears, but younger fans will have a ball, fueling nostalgic memories for years to come."
