= Freedia Got a Gun =

- Film poster
- Directed by: Chris McKim
- Produced by: Frenton Bailey; Randy Barbato; Chris McKim
- Starring: Big Freedia
- Cinematography: Gabe Biencyzcki; Bruno Doria
- Edited by: Francy Kachler; Chris Callister
- Production company: World of Wonder
- Distributed by: Cinetic Media
- Release date: April 2020 (Tribeca)
- Running time: 85 minutes
- Country: United States
- Language: English

Freedia Got a Gun is a World of Wonder documentary film starring Big Freedia and directed by Chris McKim. Fenton Bailey, Randy Barbato and McKim served as producers. The 85-minute film focuses on gun violence and follows Freedia as she revisits her New Orleans hometown.

Freedia's younger brother, Adam Ross, was murdered by gun violence in 2018, inspiring her to make the film.

The film's world premiere was at the 2020 Tribeca Film Festival. It also aired at the AFI Docs Film Festival in June 2020. The film streamed on Peacock in October 2020.

== Awards and reception ==
The film was awarded the 2020 Award for Freedom at the Outfest Film Festival. It was reviewed as a "call to action" and The New York Times said "Freedia's beguiling charisma carries the film, and it makes the case that her impressive power, in conjunction with collective action, could help carry a movement, too."
