= Central City (album) =

Studio album by Big Freedia
- Released: June 23, 2023
- Genre: Bounce
- Length: 46:54
- Label: Queen Diva
- Producers: BlaqNMild; Kameron Glasper; Gold Glove; Jim Greer; Hudson Mohawke; Mannie Fresh; MadisonLST; Max & Kyle; Rob Mercurio; Reginald Nicholas Jr.; Sir Nolan; Westen

Big Freedia chronology
Just Be Free (2014)	Central City (2023)	Pressing Onward (2025)

Singles from Central City
- 1. "Central City Freestyle" Released: March 31, 2023; 2. "$100 Bill" Released: April 28, 2023; 3. "Bigfoot" Released: May 26, 2023; 4. "El Niño" Released: June 19, 2023

Central City is the second studio album by American rapper Big Freedia, released through Queen Diva Music on June 23, 2023. It follows nine years after her previous album, Just Be Free (2014). The album features guest appearances from Kamaiyah, Kelly Price, Lil Wayne, Boyfriend, Ciara, Sonyae, Faith Evans, and the Soul Rebels. Big Freedia toured North America in support of the record across mid-2023.

== Background ==
The album features Big Freedia "infusing" her bounce style of music with "an invigorated, hip-hop-inspired energy" that she has called "bigga bounce". In a statement, Big Freedia said: "Welcome to Central City, y'all, where I pay homage to my city, my roots, hip-hop, and to the art of creating a new sound".

== Singles ==
Central City was preceded by three singles: "Central City Freestyle" in March 2023, "$100 Bill" featuring Ciara at the end of April 2023, and "Bigfoot" alongside the album's announcement on May 26, 2023.

== Critical reception ==
Professional ratings
Review scores
Source	Rating
AllMusic	4/5 stars
The Observer	4/5 stars
Pitchfork	7.6/10

AllMusic's Neil Z., Yeung wrote that "although noticeably more polished than other contemporary bounce releases, these cleaned-up anthems aim to draw a larger audience into the scene, both with their radio-friendly approach and marquee guests", also adding that "altogether, Central City is a total riot and fun as hell, the culmination of years of grinding and fighting to place New Orleans bounce on an even larger stage". Kitty Empire of The Observer described it as "an album of bass-laden beasts, star guests and surprisingly musical moments", also finding that it contains "high production values and songcraft". Eric Torres of Pitchfork opined that "Freedia branches out more than ever, switching between classic bounce and the occasional hard-nosed, industrial grind, often within the same song" and that the album "reaffirms Freedia's easy rapport with disparate artists", which "speaks to her expansive curatorial vision and towering charisma".

== Track listing ==
Central City track listing
No.	Title	Writer(s)	Producer(s)	Length
1.	"Central City Freestyle"	Freddie Ross Jr.; Ryan Chavez; Miles Comaskey; Owen Hobson; Suzannah Powell	Gold Glove	3:18
2.	"Big Tyme" (featuring Kamaiyah)	Ross; Chavez; Kamaiyah Johnson; Jared Pellerin; Byron Thomas	Gold Glove	2:56
3.	"Throw It Back"	Ross; Adam Pigott	BlaqNMild	2:53
4.	"Motivate Ya" (featuring Kelly Price)	Ross; Powell; Sir Nolan; Westen Weiss	Sir Nolan; Westen	3:28
5.	"Pop That"	Ross; Adolph Briggs; Chavez; Comaskey; Owen Jackson; Powell	Gold Glove	1:53
6.	"Bigfoot"	Ross; Chavez; Comaskey; Jackson; Powell; Jesse Saint John		2:51
7.	"El Niño" (featuring Lil Wayne and Boyfriend)	Ross; Dwayne Carter III; Chavez; Comaskey; Jackson; Powell; Thomas	Gold Glove; Mannie Fresh	3:05
8.	"$100 Bill" (featuring Ciara)	Ross; Ciara; Kameron Glasper; MadisonLST; Max Levin; Kyle Scherrer	Glasper; MadisonLST; Max & Kyle	3:04
9.	"Pepto Interlude"	Ross; Chavevz; Comaskey; Jackson; Powell	Gold Glove	1:08
10.	"Booty Like a Drummer"	Ross; Yunoka Berry; Pigott	BlaqNMild	2:26
11.	"You Already Know" (featuring Sonyae)	Ross; Pigott	BlaqNMild	4:46
12.	"Bitch You Want" (featuring Faith Evans)	Ross; Ross Birchard; Ben Briggs III; Faith Evans; Powell	Hudson Mohawke	2:20
13.	"Life Lessons"	Ross; Chavevz; Comaskey; Powell	Gold Glove	3:33
14.	"NOLA Babies"	Ross; Pigott	BlaqNMild	3:06
15.	"Gin in My System"	Ross; Pigott	BlaqNMild	3:24
16.	"Voodoo Magic" (featuring the Soul Rebels)	Ross; Berry; Chavez; Glasper; Jim Greer; Rob Mercurio; Powell	Greer; Reginald Nicholas Jr.; Mercurio	2:43
Total length:				46:54
