= QueerTV =

QueerTV was an Australian LGBTQ+ television series produced by Panda Media, created and directed by Chris Reynolds and Pandora Box. It screened on Australian channels including Television Sydney, Foxtel's Aurora Community Channel, Austar, and Optus Digital Networks.

The QueerTV crew filmed and reported on the Sydney Gay and Lesbian Mardi Gras between 2004 and 2010. The line up of presenters and reporters included Pandora Box, Jo Smith, Sexy Galexy, Goldie MacShift, Aaron Harkness, Ricki Renee, BovaGirl, and Matt Taylor.

== See also ==
- Out TV (disambiguation)
