= Big Freedia: Queen of Bounce =

- Also known as: Big Freedia Bounces Back
- Starring: Big Freedia
- Country of origin: United States
- Original language: English
- No. of seasons: 6
- No. of episodes: 47

Production
- Production location: New Orleans, Louisiana
- Running time: 30 minutes with commercials
- Production company: World of Wonder

Original release
- Network: Fuse
- Release: October 2, 2013 – November 7, 2017

Big Freedia Bounces Back (formerly Big Freedia: Queen of Bounce) is an American reality television series that airs on the Fuse and premiered on October 2, 2013.

== Premise ==
This show follows Big Freedia on her journey toward superstardom in the mainstream media. As the undisputed ambassador of the energetic, New Orleans–based Bounce movement, Big Freedia is never afraid to twerk, wiggle, and shake her way to self-confidence, and is encouraging her fans to do the same.

== Reception ==
During publicity for the show, Freedia led a crowd of hundreds in New York City to set the Guinness World Record for twerking. The second season of the show aired in 2014 and followed her mother Vera Ross's battle with cancer, which she lost on April 1, 2014, while Freedia was away doing a show. Freedia immediately flew back to New Orleans and planned a jazz funeral through the streets of the city, which the show aired.

== Series overview ==
Season	Episodes	First aired	Last aired
1	8	October 2, 2013	November 20, 2013
2	8	June 11, 2014	July 30, 2014
3	6	February 25, 2015	April 1, 2015
4	7	September 30, 2015	November 11, 2015
5	10	June 8, 2016	August 10, 2016
6	8	September 12, 2017	November 7, 2017

== Episodes ==
=== Season 1 (2013) ===
Episode	Title	Date Aired
1	"The King and Queen of Bounce"	October 2, 2013
2	"The Big Break-Up"	October 9, 2013
3	"Old School Bounce"	October 16, 2013
4	"Dream Team of Bounce"	October 23, 2013
5	"School House Bounce"	October 30, 2013
6	"Power Games"	November 6, 2013
7	"Heads Will Roll"	November 13, 2013
8	"World Meets Bounce"	November 20, 2013

=== Season 2 (2014) ===
Episode	Title	Date Aired
9	"Bounce Texas Style"	June 11, 2014
10	"Manager Shake Up"	June 18, 2014
11	"Bounce University"	June 25, 2014
12	"No Place Like Home"	July 2, 2014
13	"New Boss of Bounce"	July 9, 2014
14	"Goodbye Vera"	July 16, 2014
15	"Shake Out"	July 23, 2014
16	"Bounce Goes Hollywood"	July 30, 2014

=== Season 3 (2015) ===
Episode	Title	Date Aired
17	"Just Be Free"	February 25, 2015
18	"Flash's Dance"	March 4, 2015
19	"Freedia's Twerk on Washington"	March 11, 2015
20	"The Dirtiest Song Ever Recorded"	March 18, 2015
21	"Trouble in Paradise"	March 25, 2015
22	"Big Bad Voodoo Finale"	April 1, 2015

=== Season 4 (2015) ===
Episode	Title	Date Aired
23	"Freedia Takes Manhattan"	September 30, 2015
24	"Art of the Azz"	October 7, 2015
25	"She Wanna Have a Good Time"	October 14, 2015
26	"Big Freedia's Twerk of Art"	October 21, 2015
27	"Buku or Bust"	October 28, 2015
28	"Shake, Wiggle, Work"	November 4, 2015
29	"Ich Liebe Dich"	November 11, 2015

=== Season 5 (2016) ===
Episode	Title	Date Aired
30	"One Busy Queen"	June 8, 2016
31	"Pop Goes the Question"	June 15, 2016
32	"OMG It's Beyonce"	June 22, 2016
33	"Get in Formation"	June 29, 2016
34	"Twerkloose"	July 6, 2016
35	"It's Soul Food"	July 13, 2016
36	"Divas Day in Court"	July 20, 2016
37	"Right to Twerk"	July 27, 2016
38	"Twerkout"	August 3, 2016
39	"Soul Food Pop-up"	August 10, 2016

=== Season 6 (2017) ===
Episode	Title	Date Aired
40	"The Queen Diva is Back!"	September 12, 2017
41	"Booty Poppin' Potatoes"	September 19, 2017
42	"The Power of Weed"	September 26, 2017
43	"Team Freedia: Veterans vs. Rookies"	October 3, 2017
44	"Girl Down!"	October 10, 2017
45	"It Just Got Real!"	October 17, 2017
46	"What Do I Do"	October 24, 2017
47	"Sin City Shakedown"	November 7, 2017
