= Craig Ranch Station =

Cancelled hotel-casino plan in North Las Vegas, Nevada, The United States

- Interactive map of Craig Ranch Station
- Location: North Las Vegas, Nevada; Original location: 36.235731°N 115.164269°W Second location: 36.240318°N 115.145759°W
- Theme: Mediterranean
- No. of rooms: 200
- Gaming space: 69,000 sq ft (6,400 m^{2})
- Casino type: Land-based

Craig Ranch Station is a cancelled hotel-casino that was planned by Station Casinos for North Las Vegas, Nevada. NevStar Gaming Corporation initially proposed the NevStar 2000 hotel-casino and entertainment complex in 1998, but the project received opposition from nearby residents who did not want a casino in the area. NevStar Gaming filed bankruptcy in December 1999, and Station Casinos proposed the Mediterranean-themed Craig Ranch Station in March 2000.

Because of continued residential opposition, the project's proposed location was changed to a vacant property at the nearby Craig Ranch Golf Course. Residents also opposed the new location, ultimately leading to the site's rejection by the Nevada Gaming Policy Committee in March 2001. After a weak financial quarter, Station Casinos chose to sell the original site, where it still had the option to develop the project.

== History ==
=== NevStar 2000 ===
In October 1998, NevStar Gaming Corporation – the owner of the Mesquite Star Hotel and Casino in Mesquite, Nevada – proposed NevStar 2000, a large entertainment complex that would include a 37,460 sq ft (3,480 m^{2}) casino, a 200-room all-suite hotel, a 60-lane bowling alley, 20,000 sq ft (1,900 m^{2}) of meeting space, and between 12 and 18 movie theaters. The project would total 400,000 sq ft (37,000 m^{2}), and was expected to have an entertainment or sports theme. NevStar 2000 was to be built at the corner of Martin Luther King Boulevard and Coralie Avenue, south of the Martin Luther King/Craig Road intersection, in North Las Vegas, Nevada. The 33.8-acre (13.7 ha) property had been purchased by Desert Mesa Land Partners Limited in April 1996, and NevStar had an option to purchase an indirect 20 percent stake in the property.

In October 1998, despite complaints from local residents, NevStar won unanimous approval from the North Las Vegas Planning Commission for a use permit for the $140 million project. The project was expected to create 1,200 jobs, with the potential to bring nearly $1 million to the local economy of North Las Vegas. In November 1998, the North Las Vegas City Council denied a special-use permit for the NevStar 2000, after approximately 50 residents voiced their opinions on the project, with most of them opposed to it. Residents were concerned about increased crime and traffic that would be brought by the resort, as well as a drop in their property values. The primary concern was having a casino, along with its potential future expansions, so close to a residential area. North Las Vegas mayor Mike Montandon, who lived nearby, also opposed the project. However, Michael Signorelli, the chairman and chief executive officer of NevStar, said about the entertainment complex, "Only 10 percent of it is gaming, which is unheard of in the gaming industry. It is definitely user-friendly to the community." Signorelli had hoped to have the project opened during the third quarter of 2000.

NevStar Gaming filed a lawsuit in December 1998, requesting a reversal of the council's decision, with attorney Mel Close stating, "We feel it was an improper denial and that we met all the conditions of the North Las Vegas Planning Commission." In January 1999, a District Court judge ruled in favor of the project and reversed the city council's decision, noting that the project was in compliance with the city's master plan as it would be located in a gaming enterprise zone. At that time, Close indicated that the project's opening was approximately four years away, because of design and financing requirements.

The city council unanimously approved a use permit for the project in February 1999, without any opposition from nearby residents. In November 1999, NevStar sought a court order against Desert Mesa Land Partners and its partner, TSRS Incorporated. According to the lawsuit, NevStar was notified by Desert Mesa in September 1999 that its 20 percent stake option had become void. According to NevStar, the companies previously had an agreement that would allow NevStar until February 2000 to purchase its stake in the property. NevStar Gaming filed for bankruptcy in December 1999, and the project was cancelled.

=== Craig Ranch Station ===
In March 2000, Station Casinos announced plans for the Craig Ranch Station, to be built on the same property previously planned for the NevStar 2000. The Mediterranean-themed Craig Ranch Station would include a 69,000 sq ft (6,400 m^{2}) casino, a five-story 200-room hotel, a movie theater, and three restaurants. Although Montandon was still opposed to a casino being built at the location, he stated, "There's no question Station has the capacity to build a much better casino than NevStar could have ever considered. They have a much better track record." Later that month, the planning commission approved Station Casinos' request to extend NevStar's use permit until February 2001, giving Station Casinos time to change the initial NevStar 2000 plans and to complete construction of the project. The resort was expected to employ approximately 850 people and generate more than $6 million in annual direct taxes, as well as $5 million in additional federal taxes. There would be the potential in the future to add an additional 138,500 sq ft (12,870 m^{2}) of gaming, restaurants, retail, meeting and entertainment space to the resort.

By April 2000, Station Casinos entered a long-term lease with an option to purchase the property. Construction was expected to begin in September 2001, with completion scheduled before late 2002. The project, which would be smaller than Station Casinos' other Las Vegas resorts, was expected to cost between $100 million and $150 million. The city council approved the project in May 2000, despite opposition from nearby residents, who lived 60 feet away from the site. Thirty percent of the resort would be gaming, compared to the 10 percent that was planned with NevStar 2000. Station Casinos stated that a larger casino was necessary to ensure the resort's success.

In June 2000, investors were planning to purchase the nearby Craig Ranch Golf Course on Craig Road from current owner Stimson Enterprises. As part of the planned purchase, the investment group would zone 30 to 40 acres of vacant land for gaming, as part of a plan for Station Casinos to develop the Craig Ranch Station there rather than the initial location. Montandon supported the idea to relocate the project. The deal and new location would allow Station Casinos to evaluate the area without rushing into construction on the initial site, which had a completion deadline of late 2002; after that, Station Casinos would lose the right to develop a resort on the land. The new location also received opposition from nearby residents, although the planning commission still approved the zoning change at Craig Ranch Golf Course. The project would be developed on 36 acres (15 ha) of land, while the remaining property at the golf course would be redesigned to adjust to the lost acreage. Residents continued to oppose the project. In December 2000, 11 people opposed the project while 11 others supported it during a planning commission hearing.

In February 2001, the city council voted unanimously to approve the golf course zoning change, turning the northwest corner of Commerce Street and Craig Road into a gaming district, allowing Station Casinos to proceed with the project. In March 2001, the reviews panel of the Nevada Gaming Policy Committee allowed four residents to express their opposition to the project. Later that month, a state ethics complaint was filed against Montandon, alleging that he broke ethics laws by voting in favor of the project, which would benefit his close friend and business partner. At the end of the month, the Gaming Policy Committee rejected plans for Craig Ranch Station, stating that the project would harm the quality of life for nearby residents. However, Station Casinos still had the option to develop the project on the original site.

In July 2001, following a weak financial quarter, Station Casinos announced that the Craig Ranch Station had been cancelled, with plans to sell the original site for a non-gaming use. The second site at Craig Ranch Golf Course was proposed as the location for a new hospital. Both locations remain vacant as of 2018.
