= Out TV =

Out TV may refer to:

- OutTV (Canada), a Canadian television channel targeted at LGBT viewers
- OutTV (Europe), the Netherlands-based television channel

== See also ==
- TV-out
