= How Far Will You Go? =

- Genre: documentary
- Starring: Rob Trinh (host)
- Country of origin: Canada
- Original language: English
- No. of seasons: 1
- No. of episodes: 9

Production
- Executive producers: Bill Allman, Brad Danks
- Production locations: Vancouver, British Columbia
- Running time: 30 minutes (approx. 0.22)

Original release
- Network: OUTtv
- Release: July 1, 2008

How Far Will You Go? is a Canadian English language documentary television series. How Far Will You Go? premiered on July 1, 2008 at 8:00 p.m. EST on the Canadian digital cable specialty channel, OUTtv. The series was also available in the United States on the pay channel here!

== Premise ==
How Far Will You Go? is a documentary television series that follows a group of gay men who have entered a local modelling competition in Vancouver, British Columbia called Vancouver's Next Gay Top Model. The series takes a behind the scenes look at the competition and while also focusing on the lives of the men who compete in the contest.
