= Just Be Free (Big Freedia album) =

Studio album by Big Freedia
- Released: June 17, 2014
- Genre: Bounce
- Length: 32:54
- Label: Queen Diva
- Producer: Thomas McElroy; BlaqnMild

Big Freedia chronology
Just Be Free (2014)	Central City (2023)

Just Be Free is the major-label debut studio album by American rapper Big Freedia, released through Queen Diva Music on June 17, 2014. It was primarily produced by Thomas McElroy. It received generally positive reviews from critics, and charted in the top 50 of the US Top R&B/Hip-Hop Albums chart.

== Critical reception ==
Professional ratings
Aggregate scores
Source	Rating
Metacritic	79/100
Review scores
Source	Rating
AllMusic	4/5 stars
Consequence	B
Exclaim!	7/10
Pitchfork	7.8/10
Rolling Stone	3.5/5 stars
Sputnikmusic	4.1/5

Just Be Free received a score of 79 out of 100 on review aggregator Metacritic based on eight critics' reviews, indicating "generally favorable" reception. Miles Raymer of Pitchfork stated that Big Freedia is "teetering on the brink of reaching a mainstream audience, and Just Be Free is her attempt to bring her music to that level" and that the album is "aimed squarely at an EDM audience that so far has somehow eluded Freedia, despite the fact that bounce has steadily grown in that world's presence". Matt Bauer of Exclaim! summarized the album as "a frantic, busy and uncompromisingly relentless album that doesn't let up over its 10 tracks and 34 minutes, and as a summer party album, it's all but faultless".

Christopher R. Weingarten, reviewing the album for Rolling Stone, wrote that Just Be Free is "a lot more polished than sample-happy Freedia singles like "Azz Everywhere!," [but] it hits just as hard. She embraces the textures of contemporary EDM – wet snares, buzz-saw synths, the occasional triumphant trance melody – but the feel is unmistakably bounce throughout". Caitlin White of Consequence found the album to be "punctuated by quick, quirky rhythms and, of course, plenty of bass. It's music designed to be consumed and interacted with in a specific context — not with headphones on the subway, not on a vinyl record in your apartment".

David Jeffries of AllMusic remarked that "Freedia's vocals are layered like an infinity mirror of fierce" on "Ol' Lady" and on the rest of the album, "she's got enough bitchy lyrics and sharp attitude to cut down ten seasons worth of Real Housewives of Wherevah". Will R. of Sputnikmusic conceded that while "a divisive album" with no "grandiose artistic concept", just "Big Freedia telling you, the listener, to shake your ass for just over thirty minutes", he described the album as "about the queen diva and her court. It's a celebration of self, an affirmation of whatever status Big Freedia is willing to flaunt, and a celebration of the party spirit she evokes".

== Track listing ==
Just Be Free track listing
No.	Title	Length
1.	"Turn da Beat Up"	2:26
2.	"Dangerous"	3:01
3.	"N.O. Bounce"	4:06
4.	"Jump on It"	3:35
5.	"Lift Dat Leg Up"	3:27
6.	"Ol' Lady"	2:53
7.	"Where My Queens At"	3:43
8.	"Explode"	2:47
9.	"Y'Tootsay"	2:59
10.	"Mo Azz"	3:57
Total length:		32:54

== Charts ==
Chart performance for Just Be Free
Chart (2014)	Peak position
US Heatseekers Albums (Billboard)	28
US Top R&B/Hip-Hop Albums (Billboard)	48
