= Mr. Gay Canada =

Canadian television series

- Genre: documentary
- Starring: Darren Bruce (host)
- Country of origin: Canada
- Original language: English
- No. of seasons: 1
- No. of episodes: 2

Production
- Production locations: Whistler, British Columbia
- Running time: 30 minutes

Original release
- Network: OUTtv
- Release: March 23, 2009

Mr. Gay Canada is a Canadian English language documentary television series. Mr. Gay Canada premiered on March 23, 2009 at 8:30 p.m. EST on the Canadian specialty channel, OUTtv.

== Premise ==
Mr. Gay Canada is a two-part documentary television series that follows a group of gay men who have entered the Mr. Gay Canada competition. The series takes a behind the scenes look at the competition through the eyes of the winner, Darren Bruce, who narrates the series.
