= Chris & John's Road Trip! =

- Created by: John Simpson Productions
- Starring: Chris Carter; John Simpson
- Country of origin: Canada
- No. of episodes: 6

Production
- Running time: 30 minutes, including commercials

Original release
- Network: OUTtv (2005)
- Release: 2005 – present

Chris & John's Road Trip! is a reality television series originally broadcast on OUTtv in 2005 and subsequently aired in Australia on SelecTV in 2006 and here! in 2008. The series chronicles best friends and self-proclaimed "culture aficionados", Chris and John, on a summer long road trip adventure for a lifetime.

The theme song is "Do I" by The Joys.

== Origins ==
=== The Chris & John Show ===
The Chris & John Show is a five-minute interstitial series originally broadcast on PrideVision (now OUTtv). Each episode chronicles Chris and John as they ambush and interview unsuspecting pedestrians.

The series was created by John Simpson and developed with Chris Carter in 2004. Ten episodes were produced but only seven were broadcast. Currently, The Chris & John Show airs between programming on HARD on PrideVision.

=== Chris & John, the brand ===
After the success of The Chris & John Show and Chris & John's Road Trip!, Chris and John began hosting a series of special events including Coming Out Day, OUTtv's Queer Fright Fest and OUTtv's 2005 Fall Preview Special.

In February 2007, Chris & John appeared on Naked News on a Schmooze segment hosted by Dale Danforth.

=== Chris & John to the Rescue! ===
In 2006, OUTtv greenlit a second series of the Chris & John half-hour reality franchise called Chris & John to the Rescue!.

== Catch Phrases ==
Chris and John often cycle through the following catch phrases, regardless if whether or not their meaning applies in the context of the scene:
"Oh dear"
"Geez!"
"Okay, go ahead!"
"What are you, nuts?"
"We're not in that type of category."
"Hi huns!"
"What's that supposed to mean?"
"Hi dear, how are you today?"
"Pardon me."
"Ooohmygoodness"
"What's the dill?"
Chris and John are affectionately referred to as the dears.

== Episodes ==
Episode #1.01: Erie, PA - Chris and John set up Dan, a figure skating veteran, with his soul-mate, Tim (referred to by the stars as Clay, due to his resemblance to Clay Aiken), a man twenty years his junior.
Episode #1.02: London Pride - Chris and John assist a crazed fashion show organizer by appearing as go-go dancers.
Episode #1.03: The Cedars - Chris and John campaign manage for contestants in the Miss Cedars Pageant at the Cedars Camp Ground in Milgrove, Ontario.
Episode #1.04: The Trek - Chris and John crown one lucky person "Chris & John's Trekkiest Trekkie" at the Toronto Trek
Episode #1.05: Ottawa - John sets Chris up on a date.
Episode #1.06: [Weddings] Kingston - Chris and John help Chaplain Connie plan a lesbian wedding.
