= Chris & John to the Rescue! =

Canadian reality television series

- Created by: John Simpson Productions
- Starring: Chris Carter (actor/screenwriter); John Simpson (actor/producer)
- Country of origin: Canada
- No. of episodes: 19

Production
- Running time: 30 minutes, including commercials

Original release
- Network: OutTV
- Release: 2006 – present

Chris & John to the Rescue! is a reality television series originally broadcast on the Canadian network OUTtv in 2006. The series follows best friends and self-proclaimed "culture aficionados" Chris Carter and John Simpson as they come to the rescue of people in need of their unique services. Chris & John to the Rescue! is the follow-up series to the hit show Chris & John's Road Trip!.

Season one of Chris & John to the Rescue! began production in July 2006 after being delayed due to Shavick Entertainment's acquisition as majority shareholder of OUTtv. Filming locations included Toronto, Michigan, New Jersey, Vermont, New York City and Hawaii.

Season two began production in August, 2007 with most of the shooting taking place on location in Provincetown, Massachusetts. The season premiered on OUTtv on 19 November 2007 at 10:00pm, EST. During the commercial breaks in the season's pilot episode, clips and interviews from the premier party (held at Buddies in Bad Times Theatre in Toronto, Ontario) were shown.

Season three began production in August, 2008. The premise for the season is a "summer camp" concept. Season three premiered on February 15, 2009 on OUTtv in Canada.

== International broadcasters ==
- Netherlands/Belgium/Sweden - OutTV
- United States - here!

== Episodes ==
=== Season One ===
Episode #101: Gay Me Over! Chris & John meet Brennan, a university student fresh out of the closet. Brennan's way off track when it comes to all things gay, so Chris & John decide to find him a fag hag and give him a gay-over.

Episode #102: Find Me a Match! Chris & John meet Jamie, a most eligible teen bachelor. Jamie's way off track when it comes to love, so Chris and John decide to set him on a date with a supernatural twist.

Episode #103: Save My Pride! Chris & John meet Adam, the coordinator of a small-town pride. Adam's way off track when it comes to all things fundraising, so Chris & John decide to stage a series of cash grabs that go awry.

Episode #104: Write My Article! Chris & John visit Xtra Magazine, who are in dire need of a replacement reporter to write an article on the bear community. Chris & John are the ones who are way off track when their entry in a bear film festival doesn't exactly go over as planned.

Episode #105: Chris & John Rescue Christmas! In this special episode, Chris & John are visited by three gurus of Christmas and attempt to bring Christmas spirit to the ultimate Scrooge, in hopes of saving his relationship with his holiday-obsessed boyfriend.

Episode #106: Make Me A Star! Chris & John meet Brian Doyle, an aspiring Broadway diva. Brian Doyle's way off track when it comes to pretty much everything, so Chris & John decide to give him a crash course in what it takes to become a star.

In Episode 107, titled "Show Me More!", Chris and John work as camp counselors at Camp Mountain Meadow, a facility serving children of gay and lesbian parents. The episode also features deleted scenes and behind-the-scenes footage from the series Chris & John to the Rescue!

=== Season Two ===
Episode #201: Find Me A Fag! Original Air Date: 19 November 2007
Chris and John meet Deidra, the ultimate fag hag, who is desperate for a new fag in her life. The dears set her up on dates with four potential candidates, after which one is crowned Deidra's new fag to her hag.

Episode #202: Watch My Kids! Original Air Date: 26 November 2007
Chris and John meet a gay married couple with children, who haven't had a moment to themselves in years. Thinking this is way off track, Chris & John set the two up on "The Amazing Date", while they baby-sit their two five-year-old boys.

Episode #203: Slim Down My Waistline! Original Air Date: 3 December 2007
Chris and John meet three rescue candidates who are way off track when it comes to fitness and health. After a vigorous training session, they compete against each other in a relay race, with the winner getting to fulfill their wildest dream!

Episode #204: Get Me Engaged! Original Air Date: 10 December 2007
Chris and John meet a Kendall, a lesbian who has dreams of giving her girlfriend the ultimate wedding proposal. In order to make this come true, Chris and John must call upon some old friends for some much needed assistance!

Episode #205: Make Me A Queen! Original Air Date: 17 December 2007
Chris and John meet a gay who has always aspired to be a drag queen. Unfortunately for him, his drag skills are way off track, and so it's Chris & John to the rescue! But will a difference of opinion between Chris and John sacrifice the success of their most challenging rescue mission yet?
