= Sweet Crude (band) =

American pop rock band

- Origin: New Orleans, Louisiana, US
- Genres: Indie pop, folk rock
- Labels: Rhyme & Reason Records, Verve Forecast
- Members: Alexis Marceaux; Sam Craft; Jack Craft; Skyler Stroup; Stephen MacDonald; Dave Shirley
- Website: sweetcrudeband.com

Sweet Crude are an indie pop and rock band formed in 2013 in New Orleans, Louisiana. The lyrics of their songs combine English and Louisiana French, a dialect spoken by members of singer Alexis Marceaux's family.

The band released their debut album, Créatures, early in 2017. They toured before and after the release, hitting Festival du Voyageur, Gasparilla Pirate Festival, Savannah Stopover, and Les Francofolies de La Rochelle.

In 2019, Sweet Crude signed with Verve Forecast. The following year, they released their second album and major label debut, Officiel/Artificiel. The album was preceded by the single "Déballez". Sweet Crude promoted the album through media appearances, although plans to tour were delayed by the COVID-19 pandemic.

In 2022, the band collaborated with Big Freedia on the song "Take it Back".
