= Craig Ranch Regional Park =

Regional park in North Las Vegas, Nevada, United States

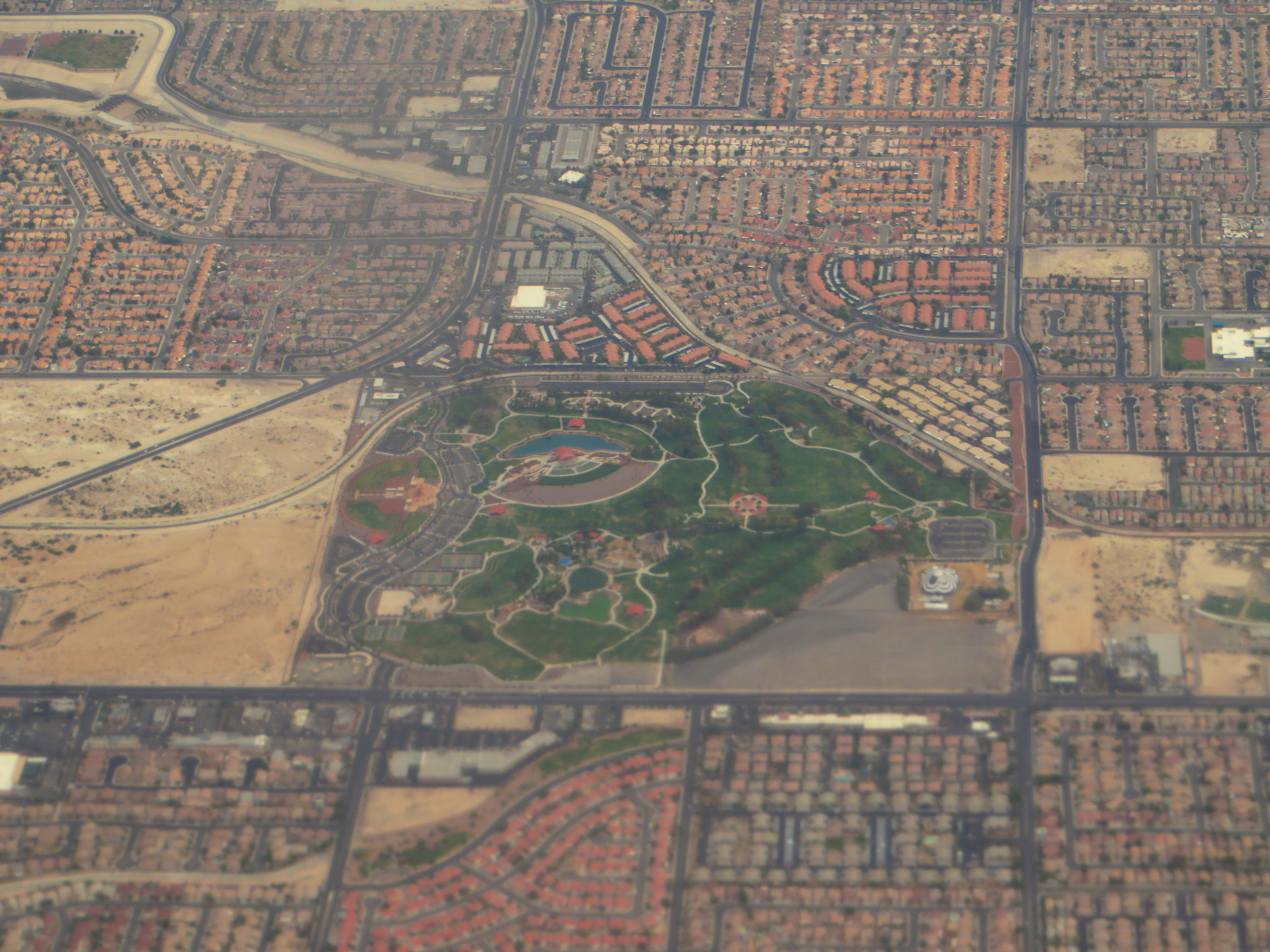
- Aerial view of Craig Ranch Regional Park
- Interactive map of Craig Ranch Regional Park
- Type: Regional park
- Location: 628 West Craig Road, North Las Vegas, Nevada, United States 89031
- Coordinates: 36°14′35″N 115°8′57″W
- Area: 170 acres (69 ha)
- Created: 2013
- Operator: City of North Las Vegas
- Visitors: 500,000 (2019)
- Website: Craig Ranch Regional Park

Craig Ranch Regional Park is a 170-acre regional park in North Las Vegas, Nevada, United States, located along State Route 573 (Craig Road) and built on a former golf course.

== History ==
Construction of Craig Ranch Regional Park began in 2009 and was completed in 2013, in response to the lack of public parks in the area. It is built on the former Craig Ranch Golf Course originally constructed in 1962, which was saved from future development by the City of North Las Vegas in 2005 when the city used Southern Nevada Lands Management Act funds to purchase the golf course.

In October 2015, an amphitheater with a seating capacity of up to over 8,000 along with an additional lake were built at the north side of the park using the city's award of $6.5 million from Clark County Parks of Regional Significance in 2013.

In December 2020, the city received $9.5 million from Clark County to build an additional six sports fields as well as more playground areas, restrooms, and another parking lot in the southeastern corner of the park.

In February 2021, Craig Ranch suffered severe damage to the trees, playgrounds, dog parks, and pathways within it due to the previous thunderstorm and heavy winds that impacted the area. The park was then temporarily closed for repairs.

== Activities and amenities ==
Craig Ranch Regional Park features multiple playground centered around the ponds near the southern side of the park, along with three dog parks and several civic areas, an amphitheater for concerts and other events, open grass fields, and trails. For sports activities, the park currently has two baseball fields, four volleyball courts, six tennis courts, two basketball courts, as well as a 65,000 square foot skate park.

Featured within the park is a community garden with 62 personal plots available for annual reservation for $150 at the Craig Ranch Regional Park office.

== Nature ==
The ponds at Craig Ranch Regional Park commonly attract birds such as mallard ducks and Canada geese, and in May 2021, red-eared slider turtles appeared. It is speculated that the turtles are either native to the Las Vegas Valley and navigated their way to the park or were pets released by their owners, as they are rarely ever found in North Las Vegas.

== Events ==
Many different annual cultural and music events take place at Craig Ranch as the venue, this includes the Pirate Fest, Slides, Rides & Rock and Roll, and the Las Vegas Pride celebration among others.
