= Big Freedia =

American rapper (born 1978)

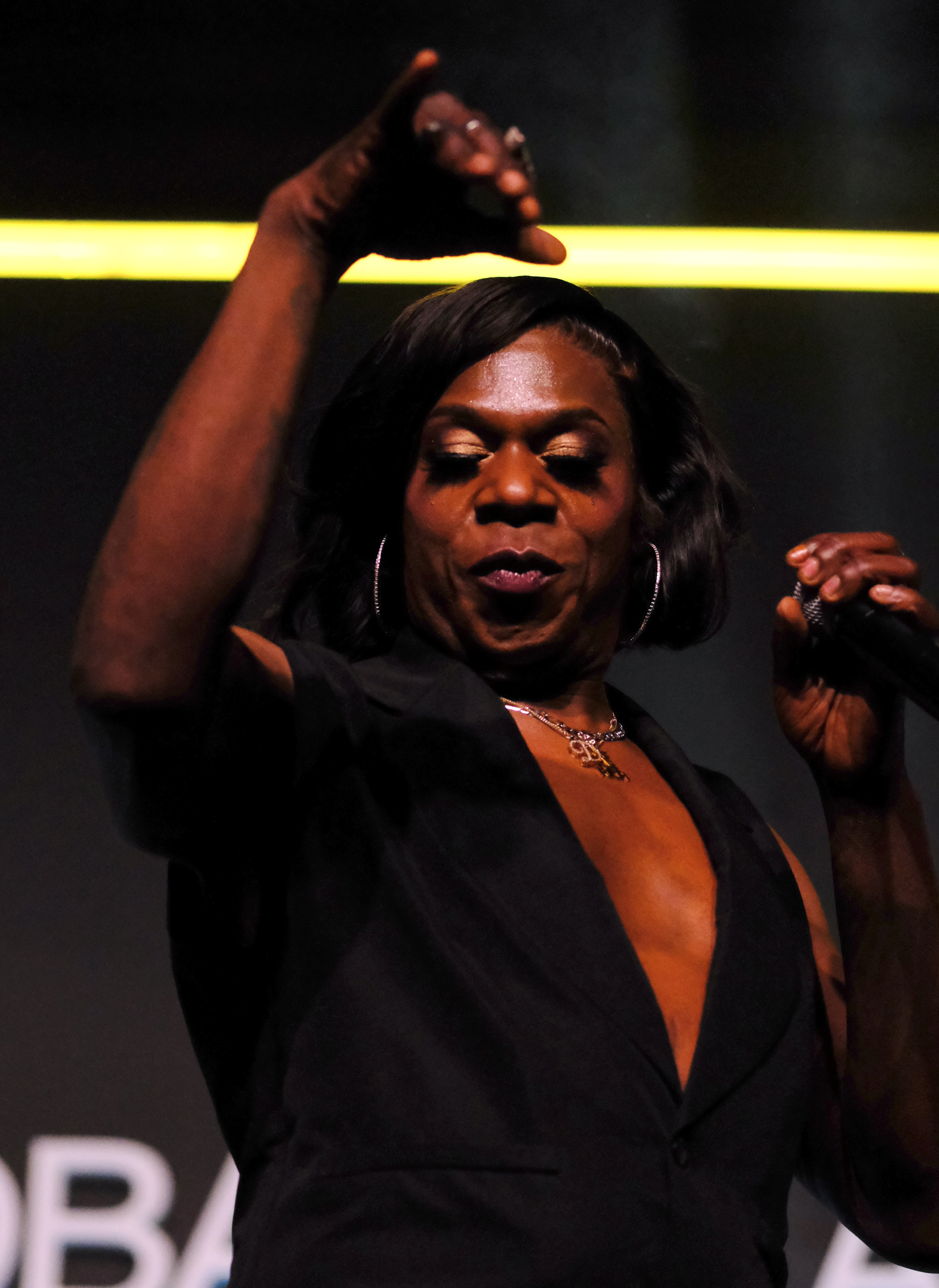
- Freedia in 2025

Background information
- Born: January 28, 1978 (age 48); New Orleans, Louisiana, U.S.
- Genres: Bounce; Southern hip-hop; EDM; electro
- Occupations: Rapper; singer
- Works: Discography
- Years active: 1999–present
- Labels: Money Rules; A Champion Sound; Beat Exchange; Asylum; Queen Diva; East West
- Website: bigfreedia.com

Freddie Ross Jr. (born January 28, 1978), better known by her stage name Big Freedia (/ˈfriːdə/ FREE-də), is an American rapper, singer, and performer. She is known for her work in the New Orleans genre of hip-hop called bounce music, and has been credited with helping popularize the genre, which had been largely underground since developing in the early 1990s.

In 2011, Freedia was named Best Emerging Artist and Best Hip-Hop/Rap Artist in OffBeat's "Best of the Beat Awards", and was nominated for the 22nd GLAAD Media Awards that year. In 2013, she got her own reality show on the Fuse Channel, which chronicles her life on tour and at home, and the following year, released her major-label debut studio album, Just Be Free. On July 7, 2015, she released her autobiography God Save the Queen Diva!. At the end of 2016, Freedia was featured in a local New Orleans television ad for Juan LaFonta Law Office, in which she is shown rapping with bounce music and dancers. In 2018, she released the EP, Third Ward Bounce. Freedia was scheduled to go on tour with Kesha in 2020, but it was cancelled due to the COVID-19 pandemic. In 2023, she returned to release her second studio album, Central City, on June 23.

She has collaborated with artists including Beyoncé (who sampled her voice for her song "Formation" and on her 2022 number-one hit "Break My Soul"), Kesha, Lizzo, RuPaul, Slayyyter, New Kids on the Block, Jordin Sparks, Naughty by Nature, Boyz II Men, Jake Shears, Sophie, Charli XCX, and Drake on his 2018 number-one hit "Nice for What".

== Early life ==
Freddie Ross was born in New Orleans, Louisiana. As a child, she took piano lessons and sang in the choir of the neighborhood Baptist church, "Pressing Onward M.B.C.", and has said that music was always a part of her life. Freddie's mother exposed her to artists such as Patti LaBelle, and she was also influenced by disco singer Sylvester, Michael Jackson, and Salt-N-Pepa.

Ross attended Walter L. Cohen High School, where she continued to perform in choir and also became the choir director. This experience made her realize she could write and produce. According to Freedia, she initially suffered from stage-fright, and had to coax herself onto stage until she became comfortable performing.

In 1998, a young drag queen by the name of Katey Red performed bounce music at a club near the Melpomene Projects where Ross grew up. Ross, who had grown up four blocks away from Katey Red, began performing as a backup dancer and singer in Red's shows. In 1999, Katey Red released Melpomene Block Party on the city's leading bounce label, Take Fo' Records. Freedia adopted her stage name after a friend dubbed her "Freedia" (pronounced "Freeda"). According to Ross, "I wanted a catchy name that rhymed, and my mother had a club called Diva that I worked for. I called myself the queen of diva—so I coined it: Big Freedia Queen Diva."

== Career ==
=== Early years ===
In 1999, Freedia began her professional career with the release of her first single, "An Ha, Oh Yeah", and began performing frequently in clubs and other venues in New Orleans. Other local hits included "Rock Around the Clock" and "Gin 'N My System", which was later quoted by local rapper Lil Wayne on a mixtape. She released her first studio album, Queen Diva, in 2003.

Freedia was often described in her early career as an artist within the "sissy bounce" subgenre, though she had stated "there's no such thing as separating it into straight bounce and sissy bounce. It's all bounce music." About her popularity with women at live shows, music journalist Alison Fensterstock wrote, "When Freedia or Sissy Nobby's singing superaggressive, sexual lyrics about bad boyfriends or whatever, there's something about being able to be the 'I' in the sentence... it's tough to sing along about bitches and hoes when you're a girl. When you identify with Freedia, you're the agent of all this aggressive sexuality instead of its object."

Hurricane Katrina struck New Orleans in 2005, and Freedia, along with other bounce artists such as Katey Red and Freedia's protege Sissy Nobby, were forced to vacate the city. Freedia settled for several months in Texas, where she began performing bounce shows for the locals, helping spread awareness of the genre like other displaced bounce artists. She moved back to New Orleans at the first opportunity. According to Freedia, "The first club that reopened in New Orleans was Caesar's, and they called me immediately and said let's do a regular night with you here. So we started FEMA Fridays. It was the only club open in the city, and a lot of people had a lot of money from Katrina, the checks and stuff, so the joy inside that club—I don't think that'll ever come back."

She played six to ten shows a week at block parties, nightclubs, strip clubs, and other venues while the city recuperated. According to Fensterstock, "Freedia was one of the first artists to come back after the storm and start working, and she worked really, really hard. If you lived here, it became impossible not to know who she was."

=== Mainstream exposure ===
Freedia began to gain national exposure after a 2009 fest-closing gig with Katey Red and Sissy Nobby at the Bingo Parlour Tent and the 2009 Voodoo Experience. On January 18, 2010, she self-released the album Big Freedia Hitz Vol. 1 on Big Freedia Records. The album was a collection of previously performed singles from 1999 to 2010.

In March 2010, she was booked for a showcase of New Orleans bounce music at the South by Southwest music festival in Austin, but cancelled after an injury. She signed to the Windish Agency afterwards, and booked a summer tour. Along with Katey Red, Cheeky Blakk, and Sissy Nobby, she was a guest on the May 2010 album Ya-ka-may by funk band Galactic. she joined the band for several gigs, and the album peaked at No. 161 on the US Billboard Chart.

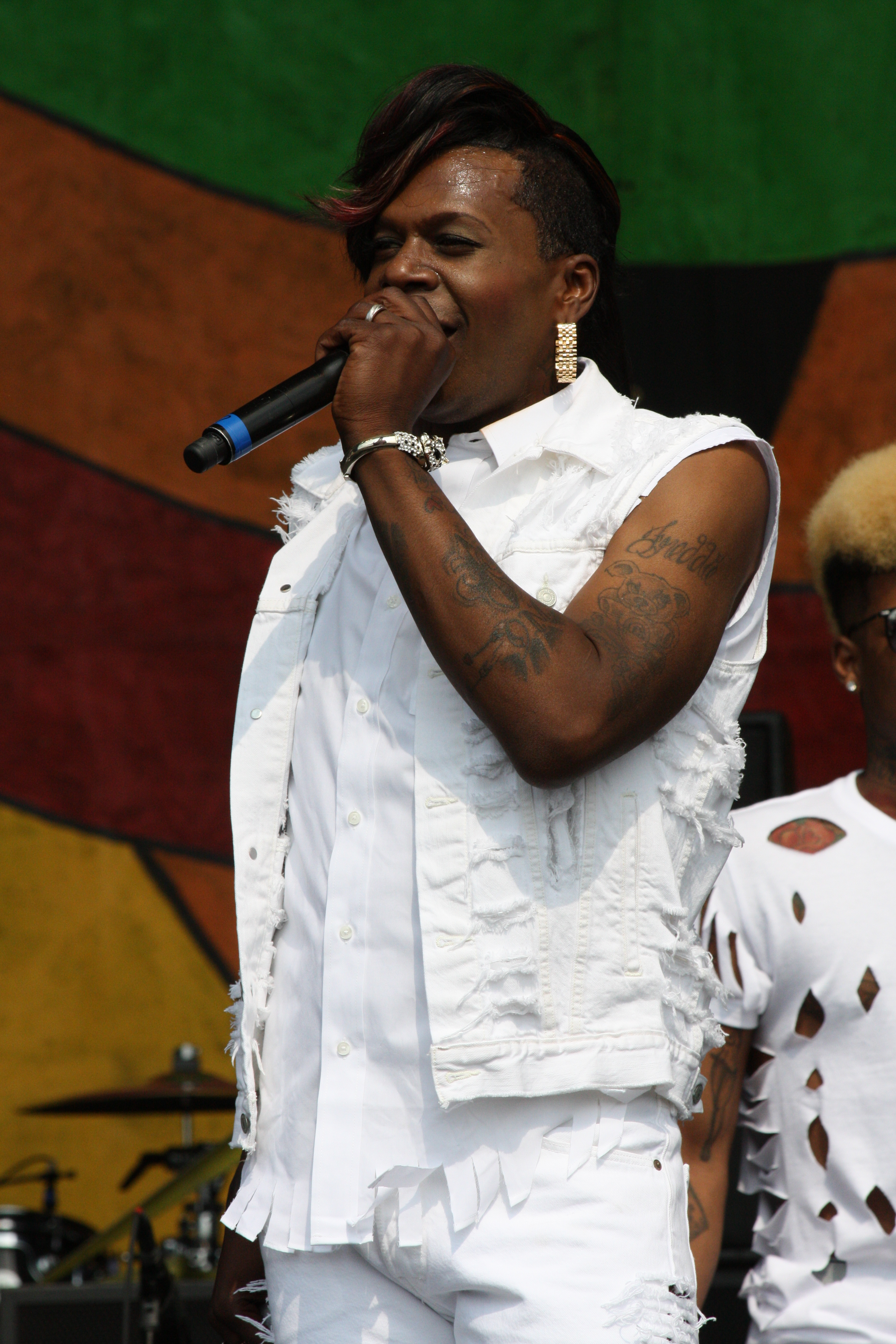
Big Freedia in 2014

In May 2010, Freedia began touring with DJ Rusty Lazer and a team of "bootydancers", along with pop band Matt and Kim. She performed at Hoodstock in Bedford–Stuyvesant, Brooklyn in May 2010, and afterwards was written up in the Village Voice. She performed for contemporary art mogul Jeffrey Deitch at Basel Miami and at New York's MoMa art museum. Upon returning to New Orleans, she was pursued by a New York journalist and was featured in The New York Times on July 22, 2010. She continued to tour throughout the United States, and in Fall 2010 had her first national television appearance on the Last Call with Carson Daly. In October 2010, the New Orleans Times-Picayune called her an "overnight sensation".

In 2011, Freedia was named Best Emerging Artist and Best Hip-Hop/Rap Artist in January's "Best of the Beat Awards". Big Freedia Hitz Vol. 1 was nominated by the 22nd GLAAD Media Awards in 2011. The album was re-released on Scion A/V in March 2011, along with a number of music videos. She also won an MTV 0 Award in 2012 for "Too Much Ass for TV".

She appeared on HBO's Treme, a drama following residents of New Orleans as they try to rebuild after Katrina. She performed on Jimmy Kimmel Live! on January 25, 2012. Her performance at South by Southwest (SXSW) in 2012 was reviewed by Rolling Stone as "Probably this writer's favorite SXSW set".

Freedia toured with The Postal Service in 2013, opening for the band at numerous venues throughout July and August.

In 2013, music television channel Fuse aired the first season of Big Freedia: Queen of Bounce, a reality show chronicling Freedia's growing mainstream attention and her life back in New Orleans. During publicity for the show, Freedia led a crowd of hundreds in New York City to set the Guinness World Record for twerking. The second season of the show aired in 2014 and followed her mother Vera Ross's battle with cancer, which she lost on April 1, 2014, while Freedia was away doing a show. Freedia immediately flew back to New Orleans and planned a jazz funeral through the streets of the city, which the show aired. The show has been airing for six seasons, was expanded from 30 minutes to an hour, and is now called Big Freedia Bounces Back.

On July 31, 2014, Freedia headlined "4th Year Anniversary of Bounce" at Republic, as well as the next year's event at the same venue.

The book, Big Freedia: God Save the Queen Diva!, written by the "gay, self-proclaimed mama's boy who exploded onto the formerly underground Bounce music scene" along with Nicole Balin, was released July 2015.

On February 6, 2016, Beyoncé released a surprise single, "Formation", and an accompanying music video, filmed in New Orleans, which sampled speech from Messy Mya and Big Freedia. Freedia is heard saying, "I did not come to play with you hoes, haha. I came to slay, bitch! I like cornbread and collard greens, bitch! Oh yas, you besta believe it," in the music video.

Beyoncé also uses Freedia's voice to open her 2016 "Formation" World Tour. Freedia says, "Oh Miss Bey, I know you came to slay! Give them hoes what they came to see. Baby, when I tell you, I'm back by popular demand. I did not come to play with you hoes. I came to slay, bitch! Oh yes, you best believe it, I always slay. You know I don't play!" For the show at the Mercedes-Benz Superdome in Freedia's native New Orleans, Beyoncé brought her on stage to introduce the show live.

Artists, such as Beyoncé and Drake, promoting Big Freedia have been criticized for using Big Freedia's voice but leaving her completely visually absent from their videos. However, in a 2018 interview with Wendy Williams, Freedia said she was out of the country doing a show and therefore she could not be in the "Formation" video with Beyoncé. Big Freedia has performed onstage with Beyoncé in at least one location of her Formation Tour. In 2021, she collaborated a song "Goin' Looney" for the Space Jam: A New Legacy soundtrack.

=== Recent work ===
In August 2016, The Fader premiered the "big room banger", "Marie Antoinette feat. Big Freedia", a song by New Orleans-based artist Boyfriend. In December 2016, Big Freedia released A Very Big Freedia Christmazz, which she also collaborated on with Boyfriend, who co-produced and co-wrote 4 songs on the EP.

In September 2017, Big Freedia released the single, "Dive" which featured rapper Mannie Fresh, who is also from New Orleans. They decided to work together after Fresh appeared on her show, Big Freedia: Queen of Bounce. The song was originally going to be included on a joint mixtape called The Bounce Back, but the album was scrapped for unknown reasons.

"Make It Jingle" is part of the track list for the rhythm music game Just Dance 2018, as well as the song's inclusion on the Office Christmas Party soundtrack.

In April 2018, Drake's number-one hit "Nice for What" featured uncredited vocals from Freedia in the introduction to the track.

After signing her first major record deal with Asylum Records, Freedia released the first single from her June 1 EP, Third Ward Bounce, featuring artists such as Lizzo. The song, titled "Rent", was also available as a music video.

On October 24, 2019, Freedia was featured on Kesha's "Raising Hell", the lead single for her fourth studio album High Road. They promoted the song together at the 2019 AMA's and The Late Show with Stephen Colbert.

In 2020, Freedia released a documentary film about her New Orleans upbringing and the issues of gun violence. The film, Freedia Got a Gun, is a response to her brother's 2018 murder and explores Freedia's experience with gun violence in the community and tries to uncover the root causes of the issue.

In April 2020, Freedia collaborated with New Kids on the Block, Jordin Sparks, Naughty by Nature and Boyz II Men on the song "House Party", a song written during social distancing during COVID-19. The video for "House Party" was shot on cell phones.

On February 10, 2021, a remix of Rebecca Black's song "Friday" was released, featuring Big Freedia along with Dorian Electra and 3OH!3.

Freedia appeared as a guest judge on RuPaul's Drag Race All Stars season 6 episode 2 in June 2021.

On September 15, 2021, she appeared as a guest judge in episode 3 of the sixth season of Nailed It!.

In April 2022, Freedia was named Artist Ambassador for US Independent Venue Week. In June 2022, Freedia appeared on Beyoncé's single "Break My Soul".

In March 2025, it was announced that Freedia would be featured on In the Garden, a concept album and musical by the artist Boyfriend released on May 9, 2025. The album reimagines the story of Adam and Eve but through Eve's lens. The project features Boyfriend as Eve alongside Billy Porter (narrator), Jake Shears (Adam), Freedia (God), and Peaches (Serpent). Freedia is releasing the album on her label Queen Diva.

On June 19, 2026, Freedia released a three-track EP produced by Sophie, which had been recorded in 2016.

== Personal life ==
Big Freedia and Devon Hurst were partners for 20 years. In May 2025, Hurst died from diabetes complications.

Freedia operates an interior design business whose clients included the administration of Ray Nagin when he was the mayor of New Orleans.

In 2016, Freedia was indicted on charges of theft of government funds after she failed to report her income earnings between 2010 and 2014 while still claiming Section 8 housing benefits. Later that year, she pled guilty to all charges. She was sentenced to three years' probation and ordered to pay $35,000 in restitution and perform 100 hours of community service in lieu of a jail sentence. In addition, they were ordered to live in a halfway house prior to sentencing after testing positive for marijuana and methamphetamine and was ordered to undergo drug testing as a condition of her probation. In 2018, Big Freedia revealed in an Instagram video that the judge in the case had granted her request to end his probation one year early for good behavior.

In 2021, Big Freedia endorsed Democratic candidate Gary Chambers in the 2021 Louisiana's 2nd congressional district special election, recording a song and filming a music video in support of Chambers and his campaign.

=== Gender and pronouns ===
Freedia stated in 2020:

How do I identify? I do not mind if you call me "he" or "she." Both are right! Although some of my early influences were the drag queens of New Orleans (including my uncle), I don't wear dresses or high heels. I was born male and remain male—physically, hormonally and mentally. But I am a gay male. Some folks insist I have to be trans, but I don't agree. I'm gender nonconforming, fluid, nonbinary. If I had known the "queen" in Queen Diva would cause so much confusion, I might have called myself the king!

Big Freedia considers herself gender fluid and is comfortable with people using either he/him or she/her pronouns. She has stated that she doesn't feel pressured to gender herself and that it ultimately doesn't matter to her what pronouns people use.

In a 2013 interview with Out Freedia said "Whatever makes my fans comfortable—to be able to call me 'he' or 'she,'—I'll allow. I let them have the freedom to choose either one." and "I have fans who say 'he' all the time; I have fans who say 'she' all the time. I'm confident in who I am, and I know what I stand for. When they say either/or, I'm not affected by either/or because, like I said, I know who I am." In a 2015 interview, Freedia stated, "I wear women's hair and carry a purse, but I am a man." and "...I'm a straight-UP gay man. I love my feminine side. She is the diva in me. I think gender identity is on a spectrum and that means there's lots of grey area!" By 2018 and 2020, Freedia expressed a lack of preference for any one pronoun in particular. In 2020, responding to the question, "Do you feel like you've been pressured to gender yourself?" Freedia responded:

Yeah, definitely. But they can't put me in a box, child. I don't let 'em. I get this question every interview: "What is your preferred pronoun?" and all of that. I'm me. That's my preferred pronoun. I tell people all the time, it don't matter if you call me "he", "she", "it", whatever. I know who I am and that's all that matters.

== Discography ==
- Just Be Free (2014)
- Central City (2023)
- Pressing Onward (2025)

== Filmography ==
Year	Title	Role	Notes
2010	Last Call with Carson Daly	Self	
2011	Treme	Self	2 episodes
2011	Prince Paul's Adventurous Musical Journey	Self	
2012	Jimmy Kimmel Live!	Self	
2013–2017	Big Freedia: Queen of Bounce	Self	
2013	Watch What Happens Live with Andy Cohen	Self	
2013	Totally Biased with W. Kamau Bell	Self	2 episodes
2015	The Real	Self	
2015	Love & Hip Hop: Hollywood	Self	
2017	When Love Kills: The Falicia Blakely Story	Tam	
2017	Heart, Baby!	Dixie	
2018	The Untitled Action Bronson Show	Self	
2018	Ridiculousness	Self	
2020	Freedia Got a Gun	Self	documentary film
2020	The Eric Andre Show	Self	
2021	The Real Housewives of Atlanta	Self	Season 13
2021	RuPaul's Drag Race All Stars	Self (guest judge)	Season 6, episode 2: "The Blue Ball"
2021	Nailed It!	Self (guest judge)	Season 6, episode 2: "C'est Jacques"
2022	P-Valley	Self	Season 2, episode 3 "The Dirty Dozen"
2022	Queer as Folk	Self	Season 1, episode 8: "Sacrilege"
2022	College Hill: Celebrity Edition	Self	Main cast
2023	Miss Universe 2022	Self	Selection committee & performer
2024	Rock Paper Scissors	Car Wash Nationals Singer	Episode: Car Wash Nationals
2025	Fucktoys	Tarot Woman	

== Awards and nominations ==
Award	Year	Nominee(s)	Category	Result	Ref.
Queerty Awards	2013	Herself	Twerker of the Year	Nominated	
Queerty Awards	2014	Herself	Rising Diva	Nominated	
Grammy Awards	2023	Renaissance	Album of the Year	Nominated	
