= Boyfriend (musician) =

American songwriter and performing artists (born 1988)

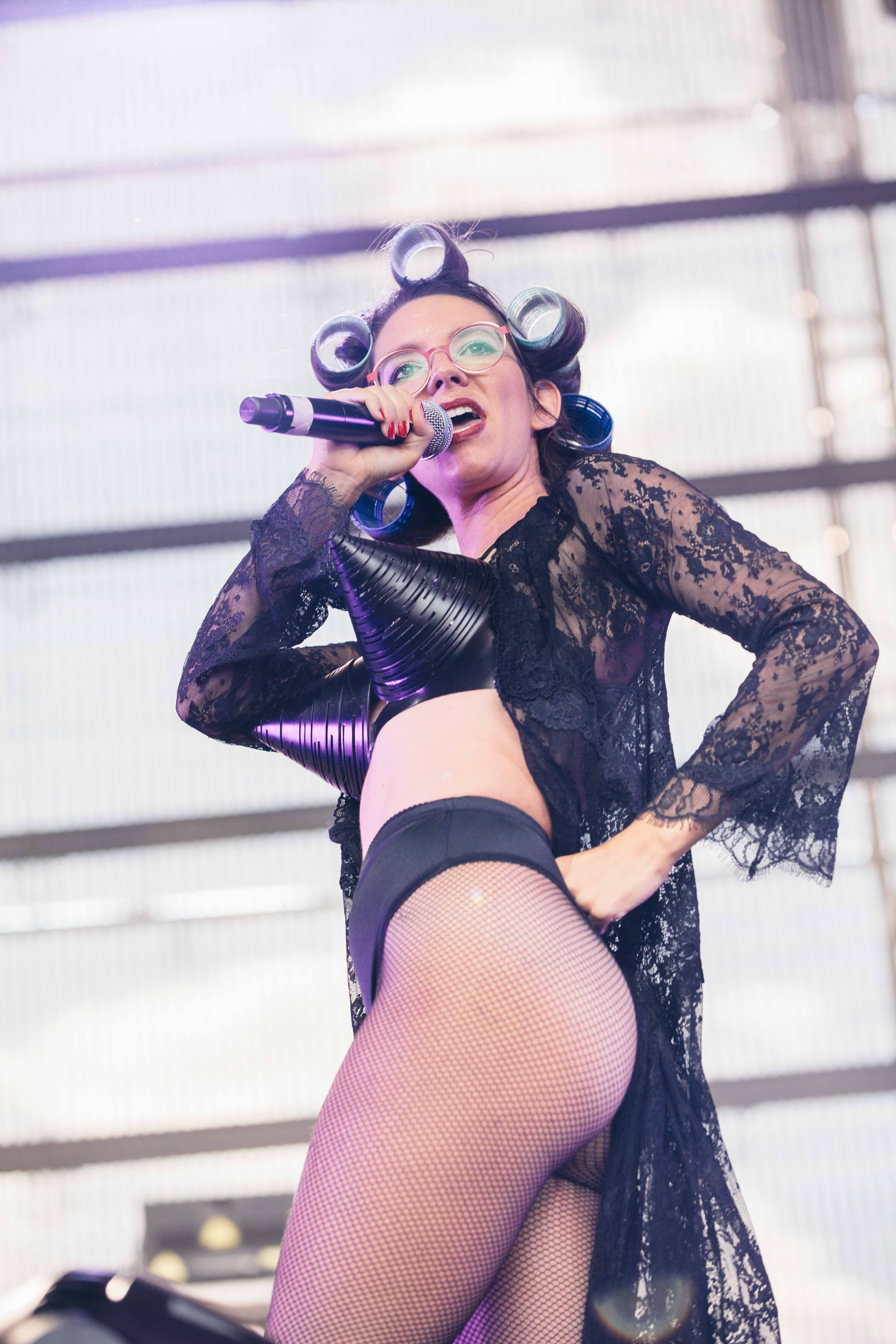
- Boyfriend in 2015

Background information
- Also known as: Boyfriend
- Born: Suzannah Elizabeth Powell; August 16, 1988 (age 38); Nashville, Tennessee, U.S.
- Genres: Pop; cabaret; musical theater
- Years active: 2012–present
- Labels: Queen Diva; xoboyfriend
- Website: www.imyourboyfriend.com

Suzannah Elizabeth Powell (born August 16, 1988), known professionally as Boyfriend, is an American singer, songwriter, producer, and performance artist. Raised in Nashville, she developed her stage persona after moving to New Orleans coining the term "rap-cabaret" to describe her theatrical approach to live performance. In 2026, Powell announced that she would retire the Boyfriend persona following a farewell tour, closing the chapter on the performance character after 15 years.

== Early life and education ==
The daughter of country music songwriter and producer Monty Powell, Boyfriend grew up in Nashville, Tennessee, where she was raised in the churches of Christ. She attended parochial school before transferring to Hume-Fogg High School in downtown Nashville. She later studied creative writing at the University of California, Los Angeles (UCLA).

In 2014, she came out as pansexual. In an interview, she said that her early environment forced her to develop a sense of self. "My personal reality growing up was very much conservative, hetero-normative, white, and Christian. So to do something like be vegetarian, or like girls, or explore another culture or, god forbid, question god... you had to grapple, have a mental reckoning."

After graduating, she worked in television production in Los Angeles on shows like Gossip Girl before moving to New Orleans to pursue arts education. There, she developed the character of Boyfriend, inspired by freestyling with friends.

== Career ==
=== Early career ===
Boyfriend released her first single, "Hunch and Munch," in 2012, followed by a trilogy of EPs titled Love Your Boyfriend (2014–2016). She gained early recognition for her provocative performances and lyrics.

She toured with Big Freedia in the fall of 2015 before the duo collaborated on "Marie Antoinette" (2016). She also wrote 4 songs and co-produced Big Freedia's December 2016 EP, A Very Big Freedia Christmazz.

In spring of 2017, Boyfriend released Next, an EP produced in Laurel Canyon with the help of Pablo Dylan, grandson of Bob Dylan and son of Jesse Dylan and New Orleans musicians Khris Royal, Joe Shirley, and Alvin Ford Jr. The EP includes a track featuring Cindy Wilson of The B-52's.

In December 2017, Boyfriend headlined a party in Tokyo, Japan, for Marc Jacobs at the notorious Ai Honten host club in Kabukicho's Red Light District. The event was held to celebrate the launch of his Spring/Summer 2018 Collection and guests included Yu Yamada and Kiko Mizuhara among other celebrities and influencers.

=== Debut Album and Major Collaborations ===
Boyfriend's debut album, Sugar & Spice (2022), charted on college and non-commercial radio. The album features collaborations with Pussy Riot, Death Valley Girls, and Amanda Lepore.

She has maintained a decade-long creative partnership with Big Freedia, contributing to multiple projects, and featuring on "El Niño" (2023) alongside Lil Wayne.

=== Festival Appearances ===
Boyfriend has performed at major music festivals and cultural events throughout her career. In addition to headlining tours, she has appeared at: SXSW, Fun Fun Fun Fest, Pemberton Music Festival, San Francisco Pride, and BUKU Music + Art Project.

In June 2017, Boyfriend performed at Bonnaroo Music and Arts Festival where her performance with Preservation Hall Jazz Band and Chance the Rapper in the SuperJam was named by Consequence of Sound as the Number 3 set in their Bonnaroo Festival Review: Top 10 Sets.

Boyfriend performed at Outside Lands Music and Arts Festival in August 2017, where her performance was mentioned by Rolling Stone as a part of their 5 Best Things That Happened at Outside Lands 2017.

Boyfriend has become a staple at the New Orleans Jazz & Heritage Festival, performing annual sets on the Gentilly Stage. She is also prominently featured in the Grammy Award-winning documentary Jazz Fest: A New Orleans Story (2022), which explores the history and cultural impact of the New Orleans Jazz & Heritage Festival.

=== Songwriting and Film/TV Placements ===
Boyfriend has written original music for major films including Space Jam: A New Legacy (soundtrack) and Office Christmas Party, as well as secured placements in commercials for Walmart, Amazon, and Apple. Her music has been featured in TV shows across Comedy Central, Netflix, HBO, ABC, and more. She also has an extensive career as a songwriter, contributing to projects by Charli XCX, Troye Sivan, Kesha, Mala Rodríguez, Pom Pom Squad, The Revivalists, Galactic, and Slayyyter, among others.

=== Musical Theater ===
Boyfriend is the creator of Hag. a three-act semi-scripted and interactive musical that ran for 4 consecutive years at Preservation Hall and featured the dynamic burlesque/drag duo of Kitten & Lou, rearranged Boyfriend ragtime mixes by composer Joe Shirley and trombone stylings by Preservation Hall's David L. Harris.

In November 2018, Boyfriend released "Wash That", her take on the Rodgers and Hammerstein classic, "I'm Gonna Wash That Man Right Outa My Hair" from their musical South Pacific (musical). Premiered by Playbill, the song explores "beauty rituals and hair maintenance," which are some of Boyfriend's favorite themes to explore. She told Playbill that "Wash That" is "in perfect alignment with my ongoing thesis statement about the burden of beautification and the processes we undergo as women to be deemed 'presentable,'" explaining, "So often it's the opposite, where we're plucking and tweezing in order to snag a man, but this taps into the empowerment that is nested inside all of these rituals—wash him off! Put that lipstick on for you!"

In 2025, Boyfriend announced the release of her concept concert album In the Garden, set for release on May 9, 2025. The album reimagines the story of Adam and Eve but through Eve's lens. The project features Boyfriend as Eve alongside Billy Porter (narrator), Jake Shears (Adam), Big Freedia (God), and Peaches (Serpent).

=== Retirement ===
In 2026, after approximately 15 years performing as Boyfriend, Powell announced that she would retire the persona at the end of the year following a farewell tour. She stated that she intends to continue working as a writer and producer and to remain involved in theater and sustainability projects in New Orleans.

=== Advocacy and Industry Involvement ===
Boyfriend serves as a Governor of the Memphis Chapter of the Recording Academy and co-chair of the Songwriter and Composers Committee.

An advocate for sustainability, she is a Notable Member of the Plastic Pollution Coalition, serves as a board member for Grounds Krewe -an organization promoting a sustainable Mardi Gras, and as Sustainability Advisor for the Krewe of Freret -the first New Orleans parade to ban plastic beads.

== Discography ==
Albums

- Sugar & Spice (2022)
- In The Garden (2025)

EPs

- Love Your Boyfriend, Part 1 (2014)
- Love Your Boyfriend, Part 2 (2014)
- Love Your Boyfriend, Part 3 (2016)
- Next (2017)
- And Everything Nice (2023)
