= Canadian Travel Show =

The Canadian Travel Show, a television series first produced for Life Network in 1996, produced 106 episodes that aired in prime time across Canada from 1996 to 2001. In all, 106 half-hour episodes were produced by husband and wife team Matt Murphy and Linda Amor. The series explored the vast country, its people, landscapes, communities and nuances. It was hosted by Ola Sturik and Holly Gillanders.

It was later carried by Prime TV and the specialty channel's Canadian parent, Global Television Network.

In its first two seasons, it regularly drew more than 225,000 viewers a week, a minor coup for a travel series on the newly burgeoning specialty television market in Canada.

It ran in syndication until 2004 and was sold in several Asian countries.
