= Readout =

Readout may refer to:

- Digital read out, type of electronic display
- Quantum readout, cryptographic authentication technique
- Read Out!, Canadian television series
- Readout integrated circuit

== See also ==
- Redoubt (disambiguation)
- Press release – such as one released after a high-level political or diplomatic meeting
