= Jason Ruta =

- Born: Jason Steven Ruta; August 7, 1979 (age 47); Winnipeg, Manitoba, Canada
- Occupations: television host, actor, radio personality
- Years active: 2001–present
- Spouse: Single
- Website: www.jasonruta.com

Jason Ruta (born August 7, 1979, in Winnipeg, Manitoba) is a Canadian television personality and actor.

Ruta first came to prominence as a participant in the second season of U8TV: The Lofters. The show followed the lives of eight Canadians living and working in a fully wired loft TV studio, producing and hosting shows. Unlike season one's Mathieu Chantelois, who was openly gay from the very beginning of his time on the show, Ruta came out as gay during his time in the loft. He hosted the Gemini-nominated magazine series So Gay TV for U8TV and PrideVision, but later left The Lofters after being voted out by viewers.

From 2000 to 2006, Ruta was employed by Corus Entertainment in various roles, including for CMT Canada, YTV and as a radio DJ for CING-FM in Hamilton.

Ruta later returned to television in 2007, joining E! Canada as co-host, with fellow U8TV alumna Arisa Cox, of E! News Weekend. The show was cancelled in 2009 when E! Canada's original incarnation was shut down after Canwest Media filed for bankruptcy.

In 2012 and 2013 Ruta narrated seasons 1 and 2 (52 episodes) of the HGTV Canada travel series Live Here, Buy This.

In 2015, Ruta hosted Fabulocity, a show that aired on OutTV.

== Acting ==
In 2012, Ruta appeared as an actor in episode 20 of the TV series The Firm. In 2013 he played Robert Johnson in episode 6 ("Gabby Gabreski") of the Cineflix produced series Air Aces.
