= 9B (TV series) =

- Genre: Drama
- Written by: Larry Gaynor; Don Hunter; Grahame Woods
- Directed by: Richard Benner; Steve DiMarco; Sturla Gunnarsson; Stefan Scaini; James Swan
- Starring: Robert Wisden; John Bayliss; Melanie Miller; Elizabeth Beeler; Keith Thomas; Thomas Hauff; Graham Green; Sharon Dyer; Mark Wilson; Rachael Crawford; Chris Owens; Joanne Vannicola; Vincent Murray; Nicole De Boer; Mishu Vellani; Vivian Palermo; Laura Taler; Michelle St. John; Tre Smith; Karen Chow; Adam Kositsky; Tory Cassis
- No. of seasons: 1
- No. of episodes: 5

Production
- Executive producer: James Swan
- Production location: Canada
- Cinematography: Michael Storey
- Running time: 60min

Original release
- Release: 1989

9B is a Canadian television drama series, which aired on CBC Television as a television movie in 1986 before being adapted into a short-run dramatic series in 1989.

Based on the memoirs of real-life high school teacher Don Hunter, the original film starred Robert Wisden as Bob Dawson, a teacher in a small town in northern British Columbia who is assigned the class of "problem" students, and enrolls them in a drama competition to encourage them to take their education more seriously. As a full television series, storylines covered a variety of teen drama scenarios, similar to the Degrassi franchise apart from the more rural setting.

The cast also included Thomas Hauff, Ron White, Melanie Miller, Sheila McCarthy, Nicole de Boer, Joanne Vannicola, Rachael Crawford, Robyn Stevan, Trevor Smith, Tory Cassis and Gordon Michael Woolvett.

The series received several Gemini Award nominations at the 1989 Gemini Awards, including Best Drama Series, Best Direction in a Dramatic Series or Comedy Series, Best Lead Actor in a Drama for Robert Wisden and Best Lead Actress in a Drama for Joanne Vannicola.

The series was filmed in Fort Nelson, British Columbia.
