= Mount Redoubt (disambiguation) =

Mount Redoubt is the name of three mountains:

- Mount Redoubt (Alaska) an active volcano in Alaska, United States
- Mount Redoubt (Washington) in Washington, United States
- Redoubt Mountain in Banff National Park, Canada

== See also ==
- Redoubt (disambiguation)
