= Tory Cassis =

Canadian singer

Tory Cassis is a Canadian folk and jazz singer, most noted as a Juno Award nominee for Best New Solo Artist at the Juno Awards of 2000.

He had a number of television roles as a child actor, appearing in 9B, Degrassi High and Our Hero, before starting to perform around Toronto, Ontario as a singer. He was briefly signed to MCA Records, but got dropped from the label before releasing an album; he then signed to True North Records, which released his album Anywhere But Here in 1999. He supported the album with cross-Canada tours, first as an opening act for Moxy Früvous and then on his own.

He released no further albums as a solo artist, but continued to perform jazz with collaborators such as Tyler Yarema and Murray Foster. The Lesters, his project with Foster and Jeff Ulster, released the EP The Promise in 2017.
