= Adventure Inc. =

Dramatised adventure television series

- Genre: Adventure fiction
- Starring: Michael Biehn; Karen Cliche; Jesse Nilsson
- Theme music composer: Marty Simon
- Composers: Daniel Leblanc; Mark Hukezalie
- Countries of origin: Canada; United Kingdom; France
- Original language: English
- No. of seasons: 1
- No. of episodes: 22 (list of episodes)

Production
- Executive producers: Gale Anne Hurd; Jay Firestone; Adam Haight
- Production locations: Canada; United Kingdom; France
- Running time: 43 minutes
- Production companies: Fireworks Entertainment; Tribune Entertainment

Original release
- Network: Global (Canada); Syndicated (USA)
- Release: September 30, 2002 – 12 May 2003

Adventure Inc. is a dramatised adventure television series produced primarily in Canada which aired from 30 September 2002 to 12 May 2003. It was a co-production of Fireworks Entertainment (Canada), Tribune Entertainment (United States), M6 (France), Amy International (UK), and Tele München (Germany). The series premise was inspired by the work of modern-day explorer Barry Clifford.

Distribution was by syndication throughout the United States and by Global in Canada. Following its only season, the episodes were aired in Canada on Space.

== Series outline ==
The preamble and voiceover from the opening titles tell the premise of the show:

"My name is Judson Cross. I've been called everything from a treasure hunter to a thrill seeker, but personally I like to think of myself as a professional explorer. My company is Adventure, Inc. and we're in the business of finding things - things that are priceless, dangerous, sometimes even unexplainable. My crew will go anywhere and risk everything. Adventure really is our business".

As he travels along different corners of the world, Cross is accompanied by two partners: Mackenzie (Karen Cliche) and Gabriel (Jesse Nilsson).

== Publicity ==
Fireworks International went into Cannes with Adventure Inc., and with its star Michael Biehn worked the Croisette hard to promote the show. Biehn was joined by executive producer Gale Ann Hurd, who had gotten Biehn roles in The Terminator and Aliens, both films they had done with Hurd's then-husband James Cameron. Now divorced, she and Biehn hoped to make a splash with this TV show.

The show's main character is Judson Cross, a seafaring adventurer-for-hire, and was originally Hurd's idea, based partly on the real-life exploits of her close friend, explorer Barry Clifford, discoverer of the Whydah Gally (the world's only authenticated pirate shipwreck). "It's not common in television to have a character inspired by real events and real character," she said. The research vessel, Vast Explorer, featured in the show was named in honor of the ship used by Clifford.

Hurd maintained that the one big difference between film and television was budgets, and that in relation to her films, Adventure Inc.'s budget was "a very small percentage." Legendary guerrilla filmmaker Roger Corman helped Hurd to deliver the series on time and on budget. "What I think prepared me for television was my time with Roger Corman, where we neither had time nor money to finish our projects," she said. "Instead of as a negative, though, I've come to see it as a positive thing."

== Cast and characters ==
Michael Biehn, Jesse Nilsson and Karen Cliche

- Michael Biehn - Judson Cross
- Karen Cliche - Mackenzie Previn
- Jesse Nilsson - Gabriel Patterson

=== Notable actors appearing ===
- Christien Anholt
- Steve Bacic
- Noel Clarke
- Vincent Corazza
- Ellen Dubin
- Von Flores
- Charlotte Lucas
- Lisa Marcos
- Denis Ménochet
- Deborah Odell
- Eva Pope
- John Ralston
- Carlo Rota
- Alice Taglioni
- Christopher Villiers
- Gary Webster
- Chris Geere

== Television ==
The show was first broadcast in the US from 30 September 2002 to 12 May 2003. Despite being a part-UK production, it was never broadcast in the UK until September 2008 (like its stablemate Queen of Swords) on the Zone Thriller channel. Again, it was made in widescreen 16/9 but shown in pan and scan 4/3.

The show currently airs on the UK channel Film24, Sky157 every Friday night as part of 'Action Stations' evening.

== Episodes ==
No.	Title	Directed by	Written by	Original release date
1	"Bride of the Sun"	David Wu	Ethlie Ann Vare	30 September 2002
Governor Morton refuses to hand over a jade artefact that Judson has a permit for to aid in his search for a Mayan jade altar in the hidden City of the Sun, so Judson decides to "borrow" it. Ancient mystical forces connect Ynez, the Governor's daughter with the past and her true love.
2	"Momento Mori"	Ole Sassone	James Thorpe	7 October 2002
Cliff Buckley, before he becomes the new Director of International Drug Enforcement, employs Judson and the team to take him back to Cambodia. There, 30 years before, during the Vietnam War, he was shot down in a helicopter with his four men who were killed; he was taken prisoner. Buckley's motives are not as clear cut and he is haunted by ghosts from the past, a village massacre, and the death of his men. The local drug warlord knows of their arrival and of Buckley's past and wants a deal of non-interference. Judson and his team are expendable.
3	"Beyond the Missing Link"	David Wu	Karen Harris	14 October 2002
Mackenzie and Judson come into possession of a lost fossil of the Sunda Man, a species believed to have a lifespan of at least 150 years. Word of the fossil reaches Professor Friedrich Halpern, whose father Judson had seen years ago. Halpern's grandfather Emile had worked on the fossil before him on bone marrow research. The professor is desperate to buy the fossil but wealthier parties also want it.
4	"Message from the Deep"	John Bell	Gillian Horvath	21 October 2002
Judson is employed by the widow of Capt. Charles Dillon who had died the year before while searching for the treasure ship Carmalita. She has come under the influence of spiritualist Andros, who claims he is in contact with her dead husband. Judson is skeptical but agrees to take the job. Kincaid, corrupt officials, and Andros obstruct him and even Mackenzie's loyalty is questioned. Help is needed from beyond the grave.
5	"Village of the Lost"	Oley Sassone	Ethlie Ann Vare	28 October 2002
In Odessa on the Black Sea coast of Russia, Judson and the team are preparing to search for an icon of St Nicholas and a small village that has also disappeared since the collapse of the Soviet Union some ten years ago. Pursued by the mafia, a standoff ensues broken by the intervention of an ex-Soviet soldier, Borodin, who knows of the villagers' secrets.
6	"The Fate of the Liverpool Flyer"	Bill Corcoran	Karen Harris	4 November 2002
The Liverpool Flyer is a sailing ship that sank in Jackson's Cove on 8 August 1787. Judson wants stopped the proposed construction of a residential site. Judson is attacked and left to die alone in a cave. His mind becomes blurred between reality and the past fate of the Liverpool Flyer. Semi-conscious, the reality is the rising tide in the cave and the dream is of the chance to change history and save the ship from being wrecked on the rocks.
7	"Curse of The Neptune"	Andrew Potter	Doug Molitor	11 November 2002
Judson is passed over for the contract to salvage the Neptune, a seemingly cursed passenger ship mistakenly sunk by a U-boat in March 1945. The only living survivor wants the ship left alone. Is the ship cursed? Or does someone not want the ship salvaged because of its cargo?
8	"Magic of the Rain Forest"	Jorge Montesi	Donald Martin	18 November 2002
Judson is employed to find Victoria Bratten, his old girlfriend, being held for $4 million ransom in a rainforest under threat of a lumber company. The team's guide is killed by a poisoned dart but is revived by a native boy using herbs and spirit singing. Following are agents for the lumber company led by a man with his own agenda. The truth is more complicated except for the fact Victoria must die. When she is struck by a poisoned dart the boy is not on hand to save her.
9	"Fatal Error"	Oley Sassone	Tom Szollisi	25 November 2002
Interstar Research's $10 billion Mars mission simulator in a Montana mountain suffers a setback when 15 days into a mission the crew of five disappear without a trace. Judson jumps at the chance to cast his explorer's eye over the mystery, having once volunteered for the real Mars mission. The director of the project cannot afford to let the failure of the project become public and is prepared to sacrifice Judson and his team.
10	"The Plague Ship of Val Verde"	Jorge Montesi	David Young	20 January 2003
Judson and the team find they are in the middle of biological warfare experiments supervised by Colonel Fortunas who is blackmailing Dr Kelly's husband, Dimitri to develop a biological weapon. The Adventure Inc. team become guinea pigs for the Colonel and targets for his frightened soldiers whilst Dr Kelly seeks a cure and her husband a more deadly virus.
11	"Secret of the Sand"	Andrew Potter	Gillian Horvath	27 January 2003
Travelling through one of the many sultanates that made up the old Persian Empire the team's land rover suffers a puncture. Gabriel goes back to retrieve lost equipment and falls through the sand to a cave system. Judson and MacKenzie search for Gabriel assisted by Omar Ben Kavi who is nearby searching for an underground fortress containing the Sceptre of the Sovereign. Judson doubts the motives of the Omar who with the sceptre can overthrow his brother and rule the sultanate.
12	"Angel of St. Edmunds"	Mark Roper	Naomi Janzen	3 February 2003
The team are searching at Bury St Edmunds Abbey for a coffin containing the bones of St Edmund together with a solid gold statue said to have magical protective powers. On finding the coffin, the statue turns out to be made of iron. They are contacted by a monk who believes the gold statue is with an old English family. The trail leads to London and nightclub owner and antique collector Lucy Lyle. Cross decides to steal the statue using Gabriel's friendship with Lucy as a cover. Things begin to go wrong when she realises she has been duped and protection racketeers become involved.
13	"Echoes of the Past"	Tom Clegg	Jana Veverka	10 February 2003
MacKenzie is in London, and her past life as a CIA agent comes to haunt her when her old boss wants her back. Fleeing from him and his agents she meets a man claiming to know her. Mackenzie has only vague memories of the two men, having been drugged by one of them, of a missing six million dollars in diamonds and which side she was on. Judson and Gabriel searching for MacKenzie are caught in the crossfire and MacKenzie runs believing Judson has betrayed her.
14	"Legacy of a Pirate"	Mark Roper	Larry Mollin	17 February 2003
In Bristol, England, there is a fruitless search for the Black Mantis, a sunken pirate ship belonging to Captain John Blood with a fortune in treasure aboard. When a ring from the missing treasure turns up at auction Judson Cross is accused of theft and smuggling by an insurance investigator. Judson, to clear his name, follows a lead and realises that the ship had never sunk and the treasure could be buried in the grounds of a castle by Captain John Blood. The castle owner does not want his secrets revealed and is out for blood to keep them.
15	"The Search for Arthur"	Tom Clegg	Ethlie Ann Vare	24 February 2003
In Canbridge Wells, England, Judson and the team are assisting the Camelot Society, not to all the members' wishes, for the legendary Isle of Avalon, burial place of King Arthur. They find their work sabotaged. Locals say the site is protected by the "Dark Rider" and that night Gabriel is attacked by a knight on horseback with a lance. Discovery of a skeleton raises the stakes and a modern day explanation of inheritance and deceit.
16	"Wave of the Future"	Chris Bould	Gene F. O'Neill	3 March 2003
Gabriel enthuses about a "gill" that has a synthetic membrane fuel filter that could also enable divers to breathe underwater without air tanks that he bought in a salvage yard. MacKenzie and Gabriel trace the inventor to a mental institution and they find he believes he is from Atlantis. Mackenzie sensing something is wrong determines with Gabriel to release him later but things go wrong leaving Mackenzie in deadly danger.
17	"Spirit of the Mask"	Paolo Barzman	Tom Szollosi	7 April 2003
At the Yeveh Burial Ground in West Africa the team are digging for the iron mask of the Yeveh. Ambushed, the team escape from West Africa back to Marseilles with the mask, but at the handover ceremony the mask is stolen. The mask contains the pain and hatred of the Yeveh when their culture was destroyed by slavers and anyone touching the mask will kill to retain it. MacKenzie who had touched it has an overwhelming desire to possess the mask but so does the thief.
18	"The Man Who Wouldn't Be King"	Laurent Bregeat	James Thorpe	14 April 2003
After a court victory over a pirate wreck Judson is lured to an island where the islanders believe he is "the chosen one, pirate killer". The islanders are being terrorised by extortionists mining rubies. Judson refuses to help, but another death convinces him he has to help the islanders fight back. To convince the islanders that the prophecy is true he has to marry the local princess, but she is not all she seems and betrayal is in the air.
19	"The Last Crusader of San Giovanni"	Paolo Barzman	John Simmons	21 April 2003
Judson and the team are in San Giovanni to find the chalice and treasure of the last Knights Templar on behalf of the Vatican. Their path crosses with ex-Brother John, from St Edmunds, also searching after seeing it on the Vatican newsletter. They are warned off by the mafia and the police chief is not interested and warns them off as well. As events unfold the team discover that maybe the Knights Templar did not die out hundreds of years ago and are still protecting the chalice and treasure.
20	"The Price of the Oracle"	Dennis Berry	Andre Jacquematton and Maria Jacquematton	28 April 2003
Judson learns that an old girlfriend is in hospital with symptoms of fever, anxiety, and hallucinations of Spartan soldiers, and has fallen into a coma. He is determined to follow in her footsteps to discover what happened to her and find a cure. He reaches an island where she had been searching for 'the Oracle'. The locals are none too pleased to have strangers on their island looking for the Oracle. Danger and death await the team. Judson meets the same fate and pays the same price as Penelope, Spartan soldiers and all, from an unexpected source.
21	"Point of No Return"	Paolo Barzman	Gillian Horvath	5 May 2003
The looted Crucible of Geber is held by Victor Zarich, an arms dealer about to sell it. Judson decides to get it back because his friend had been killed at the time it was looted. They break into his house and in retrieving the crucible rescue Ana, a girl under a death sentence of Zarich. Escaping back to their ship the girl betrays them, shooting Judson, and sabotaging the ship with no way of getting medical assistance for Judson. Mackenzie has to save Judson, Gabriel, and the ship before they can pursue the girl.
22	"Trapped"	Dennis Berry	James Thorpe	12 May 2003
The team are having lunch at a chateau in the south of France with Florence, whose father had been funding an expedition of Judson's. An intruder enters the chateau and hides a disc in the property. Judson, Mackenzie, Gabriel, and Florence find themselves under siege from ruthless agents intent on recovering the "Icarus" disc worth $50 million dollars leaving no witnesses. It will take all the skills of the team just to stay alive and they don't know where the disc is.

== Production notes ==
- Filmed in 16:9 but generally broadcast in 4:3 pan and scan.
- Michael Biehn was offered the role after he worked with Gale Anne Hurd on Clockstoppers (2002).
- The show has worldwide locations but being a Canadian/United Kingdom/France production, it was filmed firstly in Toronto, Canada; then the cast moved to Bristol, England, and finally to Marseille, France using local film crews and technicians. The worldwide locations were done by using establishing shots with Toronto standing in for many cities; Bristol stood in for London.
- When filming in Canada, the show used the ship Vast Explorer and in Marseille Janus II.
- Jesse Nilsson died from pneumonia related heart failure on 25 April 2003 in North York, Ontario Canada before the final episode was broadcast. A tribute was added to the last few frames of said episode: "In memory of Jesse Nilsson 1977–2003."

== DVD releases ==
In Japan the series was released in 2009 on 11 DVDs NTSC Region 2 with the original English soundtrack, optional dubbed Japanese soundtrack and subtitles and 16:9 aspect ratio. There are two episodes per DVD in no particular episode order.

In Canada, Alliance Home Entertainment, in April 2011, released the complete series on DVD in Region 1 (Canada only) on a six disc set in episode order with a 16:9 aspect ratio as originally filmed and not the 4:3 pan and scan often broadcast.
