= Carolyn Jarvis =

Canadian television journalist (born 1979)

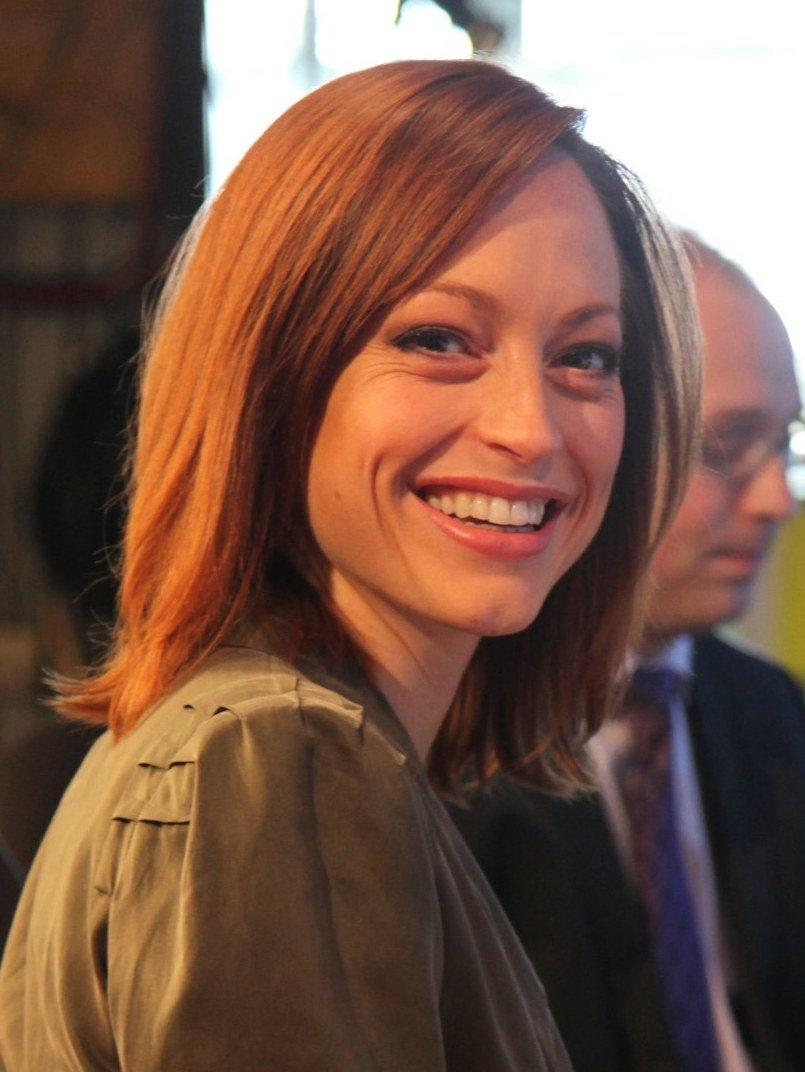
- Jarvis in 2011
- Born: July 20, 1979 (age 47); North York, Ontario, Canada
- Education: Ryerson University (now Toronto Metropolitan University); Media studies Vancouver Academy of Music
- Occupation: Investigative journalist
- Years active: 2001–present

Carolyn Michelle Jarvis (born July 20, 1979) is a Canadian television journalist. Jarvis was born in North York, Ontario and grew up in Richmond, British Columbia. She earned a degree in music, but established a career in investigative journalism and as a news anchor.

== Early life ==
Jarvis was born in North York, Ontario in 1979 and moved with her family to Richmond, British Columbia shortly thereafter. Jarvis earned a Bachelor of Music in vocal performance and moved to Toronto to pursue a career in musical theatre.

== Career ==
In 2001 Jarvis was a cast member on U8TV: The Lofters, where she produced content and hosted shows on the Independent Film Channel and The Life Network among others. The following year she joined the Weather Network as a forecaster and earned a Canadian Meteorological and Oceanographic Society certification, while taking night courses at Ryerson University (now Toronto Metropolitan University).

In 2004, Jarvis moved to Red Deer, Alberta and worked briefly for Global Edmonton's sister station RDTV before joining Global News as a reporter and anchor for Global Edmonton. Jarvis anchored the 6:00 News Hour weekend edition. In 2008, Jarvis became a correspondent and weekend anchor for Global National. During her time there Jarvis covered the 2010 Vancouver Olympics, the British Columbia forest fires, and the shooting of Arizona congresswoman Gabby Giffords. Jarvis also hosted Focus: Decision Canada, a national 30-minute program devoted to the 2011 federal election. In addition to being a correspondent for Global National, she also served as western correspondent for 16:9 The Bigger Picture (now 16x9).

In 2008, Jarvis became chief correspondent for 16x9 and investigated the British Columbia polygamist community of Bountiful, the use of stem cell treatment, and a behind-the-scenes look at casting for Cirque du Soleil.

Jarvis served the chief investigative correspondent for Global News from 2016 to 2025. In September 2025, she left Global News to become a weekday anchor for CTV News Channel.

== Awards ==
- Jarvis won the RTNDA Dave Rogers award for her feature on Edmonton Symphony Orchestra conductor Bill Eddins.
- 2005 RTNDA Regional Award, Best Feature Reporting
- 2005 RTNDA Dave Rogers National Award, Best Feature Reporting
- 2006 RTNDA Diversity Award Honourable Mention
- 2009 GEMINI Nomination, Best Host in a News Information Program or Series
- 2010 GEMINI Nomination, Best News Information Series, 16x9
- 2011 RTDNA Dave Rogers Award, Long Feature
- 2011 RTDNA Hugh Haugland Award, Creative Use of Video

== Sources ==
- Global News Boosts Fall Schedule, Broadcaster Magazine, September 7, 2011.
