= U8TV: The Lofters =

- Genre: Reality
- Created by: Zev Shalev
- Starring: Season One: Mathieu Chantelois; Arisa Cox; Valéry Gagné; Kalen Haymen; Jennifer Hedger; David Keystone; Sandy Medeiros; Trevor "Tre" Smith; Season Two: Heather Basciano; Danny Crowder; Dan Fraleigh; Annie Guillo; Carolyn Jarvis; Donnie "Chico" Ruiz; Jason Ruta; Tonya Thongs
- Country of origin: Canada
- No. of seasons: 2

Production
- Executive producer: Zev Shalev

Original release
- Network: Life Network; U8TV.com
- Release: 2001 – 2002

Related
- So Gay TV

U8TV: The Lofters is a Canadian reality television series, which aired on the Life Network and online on the internet television channel U8TV.com, in 2001 and 2002. It was created by Zev Shalev, Lili Shalev-Shawn and Fiorella Grossi, its co-founders and executive producers. The show followed the lives of eight Canadians in their 20s who lived together in a Toronto loft for a one-year period, while at the same time producing and hosting their own television programs for Life Network or other cable TV networks, and for the website U8TV.com.

It followed up on a project that Shalev had spearheaded during his time as producer of Canada AM in the 1990s, in which a man and a woman were confined to a loft for one week to test how well they would get by with only a credit card and the Internet for contact with the outside world.

== Format ==
The loft, located in the Entertainment District near the intersection of Peter and Richmond streets in the downtown core of Toronto, Ontario, had 21 cameras filming 24 hours a day, seven days a week, in all rooms of the house including the bathrooms, although the bathroom camera was only broadcast if Lofters went in there to talk. The full live stream could be viewed at U8TV.com, while Life Network broadcast a nightly episode to recap the day's highlights.

The show was not only a fly-on-the-wall-style reality show like MTV's The Real World, but was also a nightly series of talk shows and documentaries that were created and hosted by the cast members. The online shows or TV shows produced by the Lofters included Fuel, So Gay TV, Male Box, Spin the Bottle, Love Shack, Money Shot, U8 on Film and House Party. The shows had regular weekly time slots and were hosted regularly by one or two lofters, and usually centred on themes of interest to young people.

The program was announced in fall 2000, with over 700 people showing up for scheduled auditions that fall. It premiered in January 2001.

The Canadian Radio-television and Telecommunications Commission approved a licence for a U8TV Category 2 digital television channel in 2000, but the channel was never launched.

== Season One: 2001 ==
The Lofters in Season One were:

- Mathieu Chantelois
- Arisa Cox
- Valéry Gagné
- Kalen Haymen
- Jennifer Hedger
- David Keystone
- Sandy Medeiros
- Trevor "Tre" Smith

In the original auditions, Chantelois and Hedger schemed to stand out from the crowd by making out for the cameras even though both were in relationships with other people and Chantelois was gay.

Tre Smith was a last minute replacement when original lofter Marc left the show over the phone in the first episode. Cast members Kalen and Valery left the show early, before completing their full year in the loft. Other notable events of Season One included Cox meeting a half-sister she never knew, gay issues being addressed by Chantelois (including grilling Allan Rock, the federal health minister, on the issue of blood donation by gay men), an episode in which the lofters view and discuss the events of the September 11 attacks, a minor scandal when two lofters baked a birthday cake for a third in which they pretended to add urine to the recipe, and a number of angry spats between Hedger and Keystone.

== Season Two: 2002 ==
Season Two had extensive auditions and various combinations of possible lofters were sent into the house for trial runs to see which candidates had the right chemistry. The auditions were shown early on in Season Two. The lofters who began Season Two, premiering in January 2002, were:

- Heather Basciano
- Danny Crowder
- Dan Fraleigh
- Annie Guillo
- Carolyn Jarvis
- Donnie "Chico" Ruiz
- Jason Ruta
- Tonya Thongs

In the second season, the show moved towards more of a Big Brother-style format when a new twist was added to the show. Every ten weeks, the producers would select two Lofters whose hosting skills were sub-par or who didn't share enough of their lives, and nominate them for eviction. Fans of the show could then go to U8TV.com and vote for the Lofter they wanted to evict. The first and only occurrence of the twist saw Jason Ruta and Annie Guillo nominated for eviction. Fans voted Ruta off the show, and he was replaced by Stephen MacDonald.

Haymen reappeared on several occasions during Season Two, as he was dating Guillo.

== Cancellation ==
Mid-way through the second season, the show was cancelled in June 2002. Although the show's ratings on television were strong, the production costs associated with streaming live video over the internet were too high at the time for the show and online TV channel to survive.

== Post-show careers ==
A few former lofters have gone on to successful television gigs, most notably Season One's Jennifer Hedger who is now an anchor on TSN's popular SportsCentre (and in this role made an appearance on the sitcom Corner Gas). David Keystone became the host of Corus Entertainment's cooking competition series Cook'd on YTV. Mathieu Chantelois has hosted programming for OutTV and went on to become executive director of Pride Toronto, while Sandy Medeiros has appeared as a guest judge on MuchMusic's Video On Trial.

Season Two's Carolyn Jarvis became a news anchor for Global's newsmagazine series 16x9, after having worked as a meteorologist for The Weather Network and a television news anchor for several local stations. Season One's Arisa Cox and Season Two's Jason Ruta were co-hosts of E! Canada's E! News Weekend; following that show's cancellation Cox became lead entertainment reporter for CBC News, and was later the host of Big Brother Canada until its cancellation in 2024.

Season One's Trevor Smith became the lead animal cruelty investigator for the Toronto Humane Society and made headlines for his rescue of a dying Rottweiler locked in a car. Smith went on to be the face and spokesperson for the animal welfare movement and was a frequent guest on CP24's Animal Housecalls and other TV and radio shows promoting animal welfare.

U8TV co-creator and executive producer Zev Shalev joined television station CKXT-TV ("Toronto 1") as producer of its nightly news. After the station cancelled its news programming in 2005, he moved to the Global Television Network to become the founding producer of Entertainment Tonight Canada. By 2008 he held the senior role of vice-president of strategic programming and senior executive producer of information and entertainment programming for all CanWest Media broadcast properties, when he left that role to become producer of The Early Show for CBS in the United States.
