= Trevor Smith (actor) =

Canadian actor and animal activist

- Born: December 10, 1970 (age 55); Toronto, Ontario, Canada
- Occupations: television personality, actor

Trevor (Tre) Smith (born December 10, 1970) is a Canadian former television personality, best known for his role in the reality television series U8TV: The Lofters. Prior to appearing on The Lofters, Smith was a child actor, whose credits included regular roles in the CBC Television shows Spirit Bay and 9B.

He later made guest appearances on My Secret Identity, The Rez, Earth: Final Conflict and Kung Fu: The Legend Continues and dozens of other movies and television shows; while appearing on The Lofters, he was also one of the hosts, along with Arisa Cox and Jennifer Hedger, of the associated series U8 on Film. He was also a contender for the role of Brian Kinney on Queer as Folk, which eventually went to Gale Harold; however, Smith did appear in a minor role in an early episode.

Smith later worked as the lead animal cruelty investigator for the Toronto Humane Society, frequently appearing in this role as a regular guest on CP24's Animal Housecalls. In August 2007, he made national headlines when he smashed open the window of a locked car to rescue a dog who was in imminent danger of dying from heat exhaustion. Smith then handcuffed the dog's owner to the car, and the owner was subsequently beaten by enraged onlookers. Smith became a hero to animal rights activists across Canada, despite it resulting in him being disciplined by the Ontario Society for the Prevention of Cruelty to Animals.

The OSPCA later suspended the organization's credentials in 2009 due to concerns around the leadership of then-THS president Tim Trow; Smith was briefly arrested in early 2010 for allegedly continuing to investigate animal cruelty claims despite the society's suspension. Frank Addario, a lawyer for the Humane Society, characterized Smith's arrest as unwarranted grandstanding by the OSPCA, noting that before arresting Smith, the OSPCA had taken the unprecedented and potentially unethical step of issuing a press release to the media announcing that they planned to arrest him, including suggestions for where the media might want to position themselves to get the best pictures of the arrest. All of the charges against Humane Society officers and staff were later dropped, and were eventually revealed to stem entirely from the OSPCA's opposition to THS being run as a no-kill shelter rather than any actual evidence of mismanagement.

Smith has continued to make occasional guest appearances as an actor, including credits on The Border, Fringe, The Listener, The Ron James Show, Lost Girl and King.
