= Zev Shalev =

Israeli-South African television producer

Zev Shalev (Hebrew: זאב שלו) is an Israeli-South African television producer, who has worked predominantly in Canada and the United States. He is most noted as the creator of the Canadian reality television series U8TV: The Lofters.

Born in Israel, he moved with his family to South Africa in childhood, and began his career as a journalist and producer for Radio 702 in Johannesburg. By the late 1990s he was working in Canada as producer of the morning news program Canada AM. During his time as producer of that show, he became particularly noted for a feature which saw a man and a woman confined to a loft for one week with only a credit card and the Internet; by 2001 he had expanded the concept into U8TV: The Lofters, which placed a group of young Canadians in a Real World-style communal housing situation while working in television production as hosts of various talk and entertainment newsmagazine series.

Following the cancellation of The Lofters, he joined television station CKXT-TV ("Toronto 1") as producer of its nightly news. After the station cancelled its news programming in 2005, he moved to the Global Television Network to become the founding producer of Entertainment Tonight Canada. By 2008 he held the senior role of vice-president of strategic programming and senior executive producer of information and entertainment programming for all CanWest Media broadcast properties, when he left that role to become producer of The Early Show for CBS in the United States.

He left CBS in at the end of 2009, and joined Harpo Productions in 2010 to become executive producer of The Nate Berkus Show. He then moved to WPIX-TV in 2013 to become executive producer of its morning newscast,

After leaving WPIX in 2015 he launched his own production firm, Narativ Studios, and returned to Canada as producer of The Weekly with Wendy Mesley.

== Awards ==
Award	Year	Category	Work	Result	Ref(s)
Gemini Awards	1999	Best Talk or Information Program or Series	Canada AM	Nominated	
Gemini Awards	2000	Best Live Special Event Coverage	Canada AM	Nominated	
Gemini Awards	2002	Best Talk Series	So Gay TV	Nominated	
Gemini Awards	2004	Best News Special Event Coverage	Toronto Tonight: "The Cecilia Tragedy"	Nominated	
Gemini Awards	2006	Best General/Human Interest Series	Entertainment Tonight Canada	Nominated	
