= COVERguy =

2005 Canadian television series

COVERguy is a six-part Canadian television series created and produced by Giant Productions, hosted by Mathieu Chantelois broadcast on OUTtv in 2005. Thirty aspiring male models compete for $1000 cash, a fashion photoshoot, a one-year membership to Goodlife Fitness Club and the front cover of abOUT magazine. Chantelois is accompanied by celebrity stylist Maha Rishi.

== Series ==
Series One and Two were shot on location at Lüb Lounge, owned by one of the show's creators, in downtown Toronto. The show was co-produced by Giant Productions.

Season Two premiered Sunday, October 1, 2006. The winner was Gerry King, a dancer who also won the Montreal-based Priape clothing model search in spring 2007.

In Season Three, the location was changed to the Gladstone Hotel in the Queen Street West neighbourhood in Toronto. The producers stated that they moved because the Gladstone was becoming a focal point for the young, chic demographic associated with Queen West. Lüb Lounge closed its doors the same summer. A one-year contract as a model for Ginch Gonch underwear, based in Vancouver, was added to the first prize package for this year. Judges for the third series were model/entertainment reporter John Nightingale, transsexual actress & writer Nina Arsenault, and photographer Jim Armstrong.

Season Four was shot in Montreal at Club Unity Montreal. Coverguy Montreal airs on OUTtv Judges for the Montreal edition were Francisco Randez, Jean-Paul Gaultier's Male model, Plastic Patrick, from Montreal's club scene, and Paul Pabello, a talent scout for several circuit parties. The first prize was a one-year contract as a model for 3G underwear.

In 2007, murderer Luka Magnotta auditioned for the show but was ultimately rejected.

== Broadcasters ==
Country	TV Network(s)	Series Premiere	Weekly Schedule
Canada	OutTV		
Netherlands; Sweden; Belgium	OutTV		
United States	here!		
