= So Gay TV =

- Starring: Mathieu Chantelois (Season 1); Jason Ruta (Season 2)
- Country of origin: Canada
- No. of seasons: 2

Production
- Executive producer: Zev Shalev

Original release
- Network: PrideVision; U8TV.com
- Release: 2001 – 2002

Related
- U8TV: The Lofters

So Gay TV is a Canadian television talk show, which aired on PrideVision in the early 2000s. Hosted in its first season by Mathieu Chantelois and in its second season by Jason Ruta, the program originally aired in 2001 as an Internet television series connected to U8TV: The Lofters, and was picked up by PrideVision after that network's launch. The series ended in 2002 after the cancellation of The Lofters, although it continued to air in repeats on PrideVision.

So Gay TV mixed panel discussions and interviews with documentary and feature reports on lesbian, gay, bisexual and transgender issues and life in Canada. One of the show's most widely publicized segments was an interview with Hal Sparks, one of the stars of Queer as Folk, about his experience as a heterosexual actor playing a gay character.

The show was nominated for Best Talk Series at the 2002 Gemini Awards.
