= Jesse Nilsson =

Canadian actor (1977–2003)

- Born: Jesse Allan Nilsson; December 9, 1977; Toronto, Ontario, Canada
- Died: April 26, 2003 (aged 25); North York, Ontario, Canada
- Years active: 1993–2003

Jesse Allan Nilsson (December 9, 1977 – April 26, 2003) was a Canadian actor who starred in several television programmes, one of his notable and last parts being Gabriel Patterson on Adventure Inc.

== Career ==
Nilsson was active in drama and fine arts from a very young age. He was cast as Eric Singer, one of the central characters in the Disney TV movie Model Behavior, which was released on 12 March 2000 in the USA. In the television show Our Hero, which ran from 2000 to 2002, Nilsson played the part of casual-warm and a super-supportive Rollins, an animal rescue guy.

Nilsson's last major role was as Gabriel Patterson on Adventure Inc. He died from pneumonia-related heart failure on April 26, 2003 in North York, Ontario before the 22nd and final episode, "Trapped", had been broadcast, its original airdate being May 12, 2003. Nilsson was 25 years old. A tribute was added to the last few frames of this episode showing a picture of Nilsson under which was written "In memory of Jesse Nilsson 1977-2003".
