= Mathieu Chantelois =

Canadian television personality, journalist, magazine editor, and marketing executive

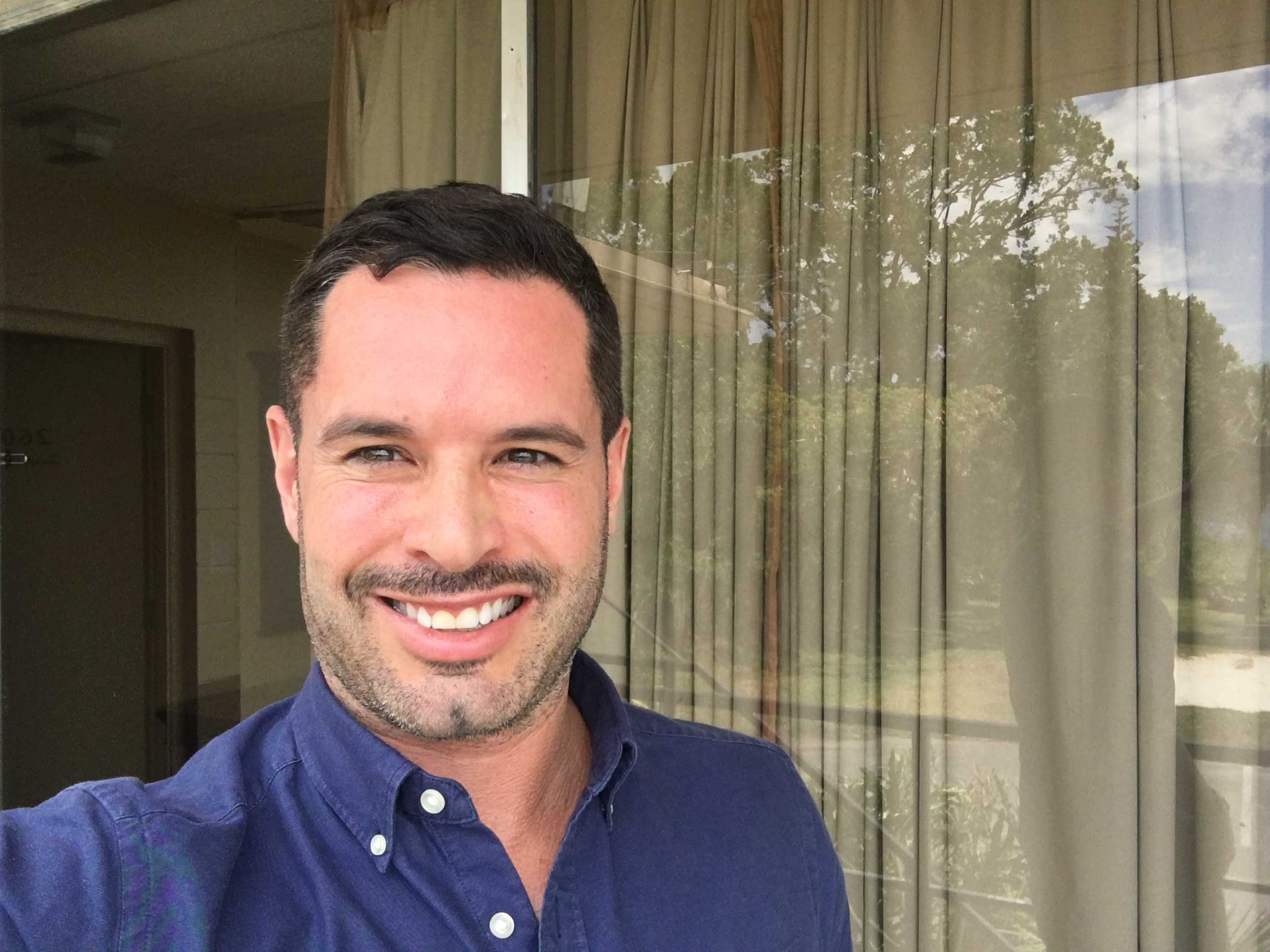
- Chantelois in Toronto in 2017
- Born: July 4, 1973 (age 53); Montreal, Quebec, Canada
- Education: Carleton University; Harvard Business School
- Occupations: Vice President, Communications and Promotion at Canada Media Fund
- Spouse: Marcelo Gomez (m. 2003)

Mathieu Chantelois (born July 4, 1973) is a Canadian television personality, journalist, magazine editor, and marketing executive.

== Early life and education ==
Mathieu Chantelois was born and raised in Mascouche, a suburb just outside Montreal, Quebec. He studied at Pierre Laporte Secondary School, a musical academy in Montreal. He is a graduate of Carleton University's journalism program, and in 2018, he completed a certificate in strategic perspectives in nonprofit management at Harvard Business School.

== Career ==
=== Television ===
Chantelois was one of the original housemates on the Canadian reality television series U8TV: The Lofters. The first season's only openly gay resident, Chantelois created the series So Gay TV for PrideVision. So Gay TV was nominated for Best Talk Series at the 2002 Gemini Awards.

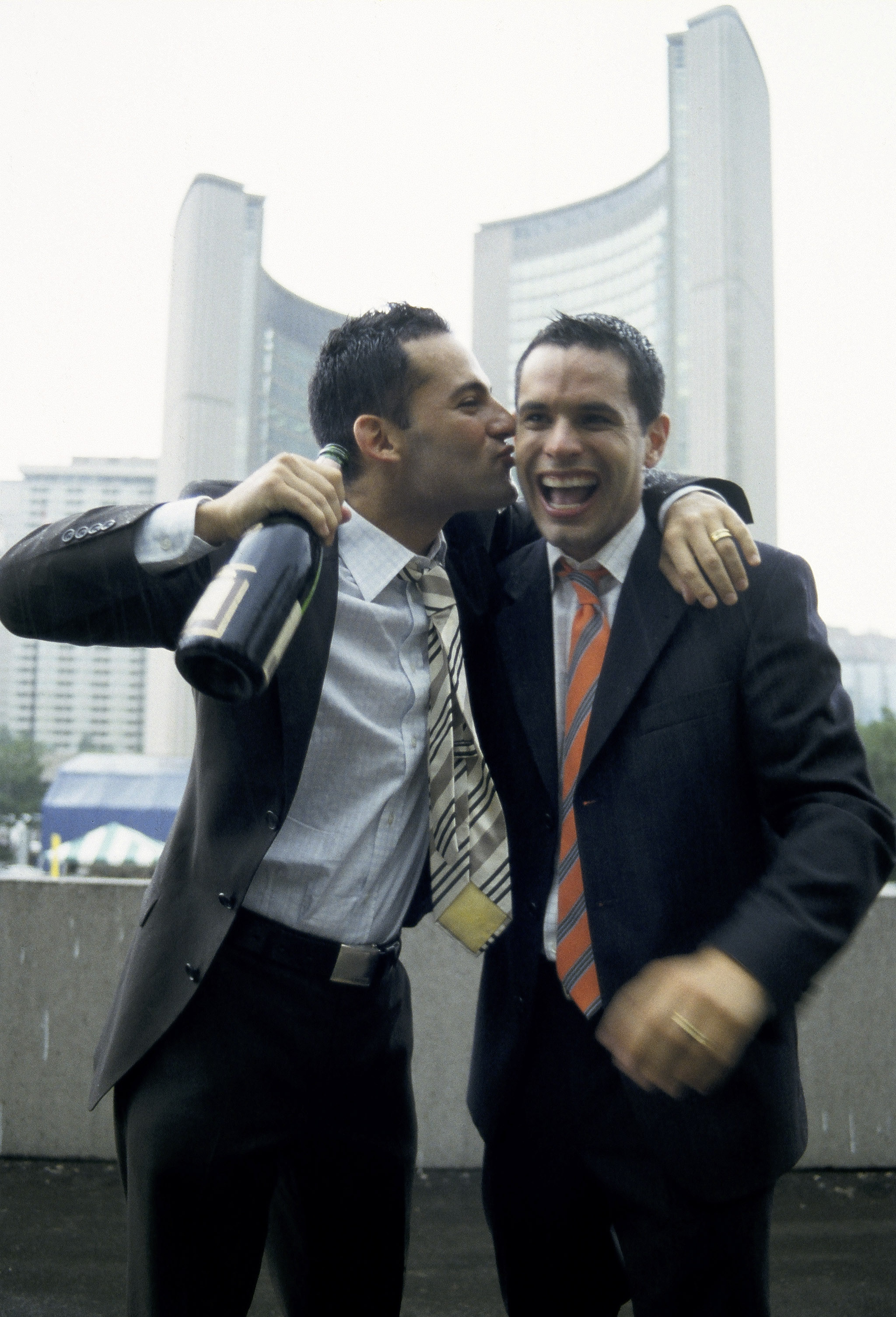
Wedding of Chantelois and Gomez

Following the end of his term on The Lofters, Chantelois continued hosting programming for PrideVision and its successor channel OUTtv, including Read Out!, featuring authors from the LGBT community, and the reality series COVERguy. Chantelois has also worked as a cultural reporter for TFO's Panorama.

=== The 519 ===
In 2006, Chantelois was named chair of the board at The 519 Church St. Community Centre in Toronto, Ontario. He stepped down from the position in 2009, but is still involved with the organization in other capacities. In October 2020, he hosted the 16th 519 Annual Gala, which included guests Elton John, k.d. lang, and Kim Cattrall.

=== Green Space Festival ===
In 2007, Chantelois created the Green Space Festival, a fundraising event for an LGBT community centre in Canada. He was named one of eight local heroes by the Toronto Star. The festival has raised over $2.5 million in the last 10 years.

=== Cineplex ===
In 2009, Chantelois became editor of the movie magazine Famous Quebec. Under his leadership, in 2010 Famous Quebec became Le magazine Cineplex.

=== Pride Toronto ===
In 2015, Chantelois was named the new executive director of Pride Toronto.

In 2016, under his leadership, the first Pride Month in Canada was launched, Prime Minister Justin Trudeau was the first sitting prime minister to march in the Pride parade, and for the first time ever the official Pride and Trans flags were raised at the same time to help kick off Pride Month.

Guests at Pride Toronto during Chantelois's tenure included RuPaul, Pussy Riot, Cyndi Lauper, Chaz Bono, John Waters, George Takei, and Margaret Atwood. The event also got Guinness World Record recognition for the world's largest stage show of drag artists, with 73 drag queens and kings taking to the stage.

He resigned the position on August 11, 2016, to take a position at Cineplex Media, approximately six weeks after both receiving praise and facing criticism over his handling of the Black Lives Matter demand that Toronto Police officers be barred from participating in Pride events in uniform. His resignation was amidst staff allegations of racism, sexism, and sexual harassment; however, the allegations were never substantiated and he was never officially accused of any wrongdoing.

=== Boys and Girls Clubs of Canada ===
In 2016, Chantelois was hired as vice-president of marketing and development at Boys and Girls Clubs of Canada , where he had previously worked as director of marketing and communications.

He was responsible for the launch of the PSAs "Great Futures Start Here" in 2014 and "Kid of Privilege" in 2018. He served as vice president of development and external affairs for the organization until June 2019.

=== Canada Media Fund ===
Chantelois currently serves as vice president, communications and promotion at the Canada Media Fund, a position he has held since June 2019.

He has been a spokesperson for Made | Nous, promoting Canadian content in the entertainment industry. In April 2020, during the COVID-19 pandemic, he launched a virtual Canadian road trip where actors Jay Baruchel and Marc-Andre Grondin tweeted their recommended Canadian TV shows or movies every day for a month. He also partnered with actors Simu Liu and Maitreyi Ramakrishnan to highlight notable Asian Canadians as part of Asian and South Asian Heritage month. He has been a vocal advocate for more inclusivity in Canadian children's content.

In 2021, Chantelois led the rebranding of Canada Media Fund, with a focus on equity, inclusion, and decolonization, including representation of 12+ Indigenous languages, such as Dene, Gwich'in, Inuvialuit, Maliseet, Mi’kmaq, Mitchif, Northern Cree, Ojibway, Oji-Cree, Plains Cree, Sḵwxw̱ú7mesh sníchim (Squamish), and Woodland Cree.

Chantelois was also responsible for the launch of the Made | Nous #SeekMore campaign, which encourages Canadians to seek out Canadian film, television, and video games created by underrepresented and marginalized voices. The campaign was promoted by Prime Minister Justin Trudeau to his 5.6 million Twitter followers.

== Awards ==
- 1999: Prix Molson de journalisme en loisir, Conseil québécois du loisir, premier prix, catégorie hebdos locaux et régionaux.
- 2014: Ragan's PR Daily Corporate Social Responsibility Award, Best Social Media Campaign
- 2015: Toronto's 50 Most Influential
- 2016: Fantastic Community Volunteer of the Year
- 2021: Strategy Awards, Bronze, Multicultural Strategy

== Personal life ==
Chantelois married Marcelo Gomez in 2003 in Toronto, Ontario. They were one of the first gay couples to be married in Canada following the legalization of same-sex marriage in Ontario, so soon after the court decision that the city of Toronto had not yet produced gender-neutral marriage licence forms.

In March 2019, he wrote an op-ed piece, published by several media outlets, about his own evolution from seeing himself as a Québécois who lived in Toronto to seeing himself as a true Franco-Ontarian.

In March 2020, with the help of a surrogate, Chantelois and Gomez became the fathers of Oscar-James, a baby boy.
