= Radius Award =

Award presented by the Academy of Canadian Cinema and Television

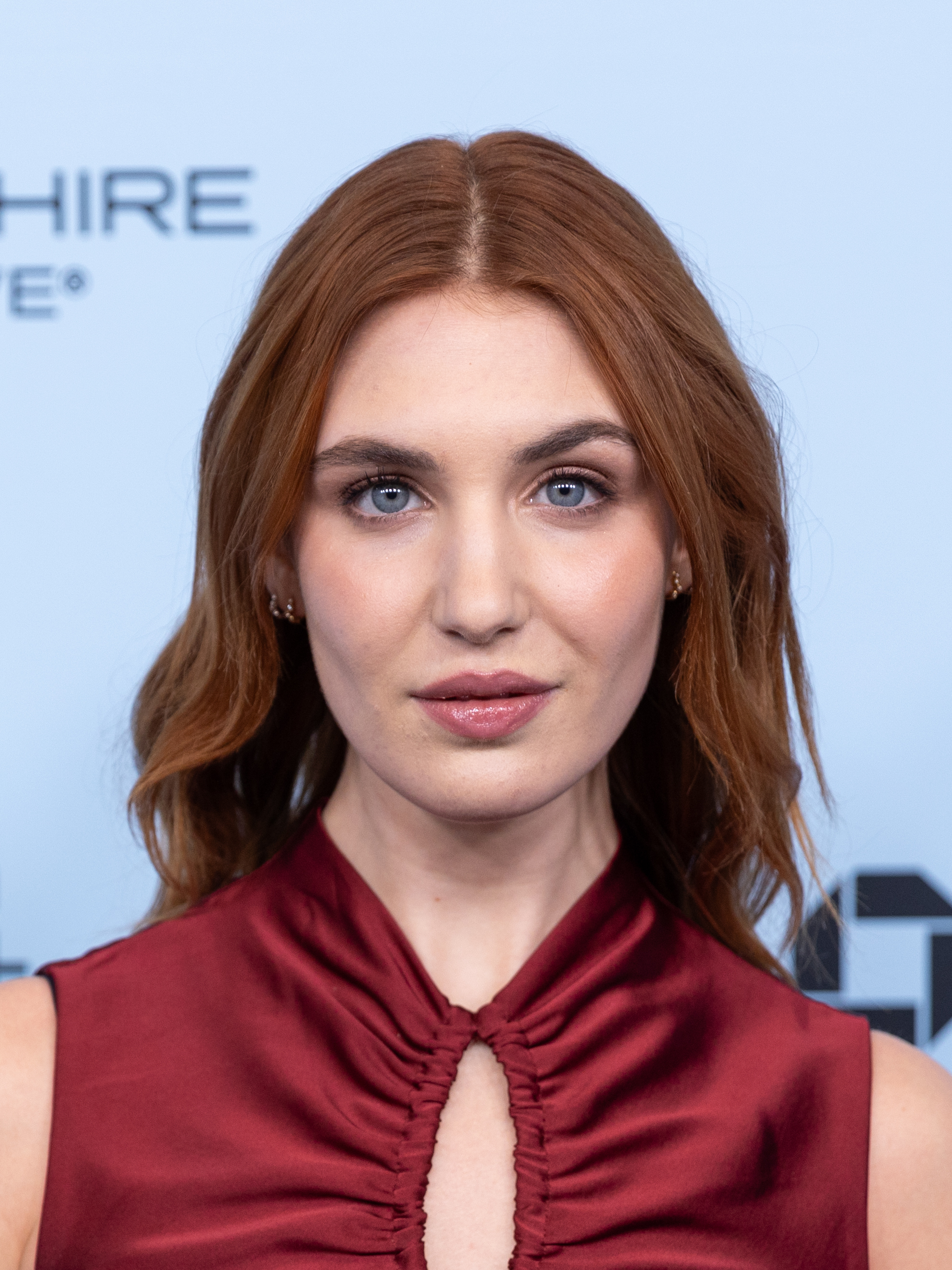
- 2025 winner: Sophie Nélisse
- Awarded for: In recognition of emerging Canadian talent who have broken out to significant international success
- Country: Canada
- Presented by: Academy of Canadian Cinema & Television
- First award: 2019
- Currently held by: Sophie Nélisse (2025)
- Website: academy.ca/awards

The Radius Award is a special award, presented by the Academy of Canadian Cinema and Television as part of the Canadian Screen Awards. First presented at the 7th Canadian Screen Awards in 2019, the award honours emerging Canadian talent who have broken out to significant international success. The award is presented in collaboration with Canadian film and television promotion agency Made / Nous.

== Recipients ==
Year	Recipient	Ref
2019; 7th Canadian Screen Awards	Stephan James	
2020; 8th Canadian Screen Awards	Dan Levy; Award announced for 2020 but presented in 2021 due to the COVID-19 pandemic in Canada.	
2021; 9th Canadian Screen Awards	Dan Levy; Award announced for 2020 but presented in 2021 due to the COVID-19 pandemic in Canada.	
2022; 10th Canadian Screen Awards	Maitreyi Ramakrishnan	
2023; 11th Canadian Screen Awards	Simu Liu	
2024; 12th Canadian Screen Awards	Devery Jacobs, Lamar Johnson	
2025; 13th Canadian Screen Awards	Manny Jacinto	
2026; 14th Canadian Screen Awards	Sophie Nélisse	
