= Our Hero =

- Genre: Comedy; Drama; Teen
- Created by: John May; Suzanne Bolch
- Starring: Cara Pifko; Jeanie Calleja; Justin Peroff; Michael George; Vik Sahay; Christopher Ralph; Jesse Nilsson; Robert Bockstael; Mimi Kuzyk; Daniel Enright; Tory Cassis; Erin Hickock
- Composer: Carlos Lopes
- Country of origin: Canada
- Original language: English
- No. of seasons: 2
- No. of episodes: 26

Production
- Executive producer: Steven DeNure
- Running time: 22 minutes
- Production companies: Heroic Film Company; Decode Entertainment

Original release
- Network: CBC
- Release: October 5, 2000 – January 20, 2002

Our Hero is a Canadian teen comedy-drama television series. It ran for 26 episodes over two seasons on CBC and WTN from October 5, 2000, until January 20, 2002, and was syndicated in the United States on WAM!, in the United Kingdom on Channel 5, and in Finland on Yle TV1.

== Premise ==
The series resolves around 17-year old Canadian Kale Stiglic (Cara Pifko) who creates a zine about her life in suburban Toronto with her friends Ross Korolus (Justin Peroff), Mary-Elizabeth Penrose (Jeanie Calleja), and Dalal Vidya (Vik Sahay). Each episode was named after an "issue" of her zine. Similar to Disney's Lizzie McGuire, plot segments were interspersed with animated sequences narrated by Kale, with the animation reflecting the illustrations used in that issue's zine.

== Cast ==
- Cara Pifko as Kale Stiglic, the protagonist who writes a zine about her life.
- Jeanie Calleja as Mary Elizabeth Penrose, Kale's best friend since childhood and Dalal's girlfriend. She lives in a strict Catholic family.
- Justin Peroff as Ross Korolus, Kale's friend, who discovers he is gay during the course of the series. He is of Ukrainian descent.
- Michael George as Ethan Stiglic, Kale's older brother and an aspiring comedian.
- Vik Sahay as Dalal Vidya, Mary E's boyfriend and Kale and Ross's friend.
- Christopher Ralph as Malachi, an environmentalist and zine writer who dates Kale in season 2.
- Jesse Nilsson as Rollins, who Kale has a crush on.
- Robert Bockstael as Joey Stiglic, Kale and Ethan's father.
- Mimi Kuzyk as Mila Stiglic, Kale and Ethan's mother.
- Daniel Enright as Bill Fisher, who works at the photocopying shop Kale uses to print copies of her zine.
- Tory Cassis as Gordon, Kale's friend who uses a wheelchair after having cancer. He dies in "The Last Laugh Issue".
- Erin Hickock as Shana, a teen mother who works at the health food store with Kale briefly.

== Episodes ==
=== Season 1 (2000–01) ===
No. overall	No. in season	Title	Directed by	Written by	Original release date
1	1	"The Imperfect Issue"	Stefan Scaini	Suzanne Bolch & John May	October 5, 2000
After years of having every embarrassing moment of her life recounted and exaggerated by her father in his newspaper column, 17-year old Kale Stiglic has decided that she has had enough. Kale begins searching for something that she could use to publicly embarrass her father. When she finally finds the ammunition she needs to get even, it backfires on her and threatens to destroy the marriage of her parents. What makes matters worse is that Kale's annoying 25-year old brother, Ethan has separated from his wife and is moving back in with the family. Now she must figure out a way to repair the damage that she is responsible for. Through all this stress that is going on in her life at the moment, she discovers an outlet to express who she is, what she feels and thinks in a zine that she creates entitled "Our Hero".
2	2	"The Passion Issue"	John May	Suzanne Bolch & John May	October 12, 2000
Kale has a wet dream about her English teacher Mr. Henry, and writes about it in her zine (without disclosing his name). Mr. Minetta organises a compulsory passion play that is supposed to be the Death of Jesus but he makes it about his own life. Also, some students like Dalal are offended by the play's strong religious content being covered in a public school. Mary E. is euphoric and takes great pleasure in being involved in the mixture of a misguided and inaccurate handling of such a serious topic. Kale also doesn't want to do the play because she dreads being the person who has to play a costumed cow again. She discovers that Ross has got the permission to do an alternate "independent study" project and decides that she wants to do one on her zines. First, she has to meet with her assigned project advisor, who happens to be Mr. Henry. He sees one of her zines and invites her to a movie to show her that she should pursue her dreams of being a writer.
3	3	"The Gutsy Issue"	Chris Deacon	Suzanne Bolch & John May	October 19, 2000
Kale is ecstatic to find out that her zine was showcased in a literary magazine but is disappointed that the other zines that were also covered in her opinion seemed to be more interesting than hers. She decides to make her next issue more exciting by approaching and setting up an appointment at her home to interview a dirty disheveled man nicknamed "Crazy Guy" who wanders around the area near the health food store making odd faces everyday staring up at the sky. He also smokes like a chimney and then drops the cigarette butts on the ground. After that, he picks it up and then stuffs them back in his mouth. Later in the evening, Kale prepares dinner for her and crazy guy, but begins to panic and wonder whether this was such a good idea. Meanwhile, Mila reluctantly agrees to let her son, Ethan create and perform a stand-up comedy routine for a benefit that she is in charge of preparing.
4	4	"If the Shoe Fits Issue"	Stefan Scaini	Suzanne Bolch & John May	October 26, 2000
Finding out that she is low on funds to continue making copies of her zines, Kale decides to get a job working at a health food store. A dark cloud of frustration and uneasiness begins to hover over Kale's new job when she has to work with Shana who has a bad attitude and appears to have a negative outlook on life. As she continues to work, Kale discovers that Shana is a single mother of a little girl and is less fortunate than her. She tries to help out by attempting to place some extra money anonymously in Shana's bag. Instead of helping, it makes things worse as an angry Shana gives the money back and tells Kale that she doesn't want her pity or help. Meanwhile, Ross continues his streak of wearing outrageous clothing by coming to school one day wearing very unusual, shiny shoes to school. This garners the attention of everyone including Kale and Mary E. who begin to question Ross' sexual orientation. It proves an interesting and hilarious conversation topic for Kale and Mary E.
5	5	"The Shallow Issue"	John May	Suzanne Bolch & John May	November 16, 2000
Kale's dreams finally come true when she gets to go out with Perfectly Frank. As the date goes on, Kale realizes that the fantasy that she built up surrounding Frank doesn't seem to match with reality. Meanwhile, sparks fly between Mary E. and Ethan.
6	6	"The Revenge Issue"	Gilbert Shilton	Anita Kapila	November 23, 2000
As the annual taking of the family Christmas card picture approaches, Kale decides that now is the opportune time to seek her revenge on Ethan for making her look foolish in the previous Christmas photo shoots. Kale tricks Ethan into believing that he had gotten the girl that he cheated on his ex-wife with, pregnant. She starts regretting what she has done when Ethan starts to fall apart. Meanwhile, Mary E. receives an unclear and inaudible phone message from Ross who went on a trip to meet a zine writer that he had communicated with on the internet. She starts to become worried and attempts to seek help from his grandparents, but the fact that they are monolingual in Ukrainian proves to be a problem.
7	7	"The Trashy Issue"	Gilbert Shilton	Emily Andras and John May & Suzanne Bolch	November 30, 2000
Kale arranges a romantic get-together for Mary E. and an author. Meanwhile, Ross who is confused about his sexual orientation, decides to try dating girls.
8	8	"The Yin Yang Issue"	Michael Decarlo	Suzanne Bolch & John May	December 7, 2000
Kale's head is in the clouds when she believes that she found the one in Bill who works at the copy shop. The relationship seems to be moving a little too fast when a 17-year old Kale who is still in high school decides to leave her parents' home and move into an apartment with a 21-year old Bill. Ross and Mary E. try to convince her that Bill isn't what he seems and that he is all wrong for her. Their advice goes unheard as Kale gets deeper enthralled into the relationship, but she is pulled down back to earth when she meets and befriends a customer named Gordon at the health food store.
9	9	"The Stupid Issue"	Daniel J. Murphy	Suzanne Bolch & John May	January 4, 2001
Kale is failing physics and has to present a trebuchet project that she doesn't even understand. Ross writes an article questioning the masculinity of the boys at school and accidentally leaves it unattended at school, resulting in a chain of stupidity involving Ross getting trapped in a closet trying to hide from the other boys because he wrote a paper about signs of homosexuality that they show, Kale injuring her eye with a pen cap breaking a window at school trying to do the project and losing her clothes, and Mary E. thinking she is pregnant after swimming at a pool party while suffering from a fever.
10	10	"The Pusher Issue"	Michael Decarlo	Suzanne Bolch & John May	January 11, 2001
Kale's boyfriend arrives at her home to meet and have dinner with her parents for the first time. Much to Ethan's amusement and Kale's horror, the siblings discover that Bill uses marijuana, and so do their parents. Kale's parents falsely accuse her of using marijuana as well. Now Kale has to endure a humiliating, but hilarious marijuana public service announcement acted out by her parents. At Bill's job, Kale pleads with him to cease his habit of smoking weed. An annoyed Bill reluctantly agrees to give it up. Later, Kale discovers that due to his cancer, it is becoming more difficult for Gordon to consume food and he is dangerously losing weight. He takes marijuana to help him eat and digest his food, but he doesn't have anymore. Kale tells Gordon that she will help him find some.
11	11	"The Unresolved Issue"	Chris Deacon	Suzanne Bolch & John May	January 18, 2001
A physically drained and mentally malfunctioning Kale is roaming the school as one of the undead due to her spending all of her time devoted to only Bill and his endeavors. Mary E. begins to become frustrated and worried when she believes Kale's rationalization is warped over not being able to see Bill's band perform live because she has to stay home for her parents' reunion with their friends. At the reunion, Joey, Mila, and their friends will unearth and open up a time capsule that they had buried when they were teenagers of their dreams for the future. A concerned Dalal, Ross, and Mary E. decide to have an intervention with Kale to help their friend realize that her relationship is unhealthy. The three trap a weary Kale in an empty classroom and begin to go over all the misfortunes of her being involved with Bill whom they believe has been treating her rottenly since she began going out with him, but somehow Kale is still addictively drawn to him.
12	12	"The If You Love Me and You Know It Issue"	John May	Suzanne Bolch & John May	January 25, 2001
Kale is overjoyed and feels a renewed sense of happiness about her relationship with Bill when he finally says that he loves her. This all changes when a continuous painful itching problem sends Kale to the clinic for a checkup. Through the test results, the Doctor diagnosis Kale with chlamydia, a sexually transmitted disease. He begins to ask an embarrassed and ashamed Kale about her sexual history and has a very serious stern lecture with her about protection, having the partner tested, and treatment. Bill's words not meshing well with his actions throw Kale into a whirlwind of confusion and uncertainty. She talks to Gordon who reveals to her that there are people out there who use the special phrase of "I love you" for all the wrong reasons when they don't mean it to get laid. He admits that there were times when he was a teenager where he did the same thing, but not anymore. Today he realizes those words are important and must have honest feelings and a meaning behind them.
13	13	"The Last Laugh Issue"	John May	Suzanne Bolch & John May	February 8, 2001
Kale does her best to get over her breakup with Bill, but all her thoughts and past feelings of him are consuming every moment of her present life. Ross and Dalal decide that they must do something about this, so they start plotting and scheming against Bill. Meanwhile, everything changes for Kale as she is shattered by the news of Gordon's death, which causes her to seclude herself from the outside world. Mary E. comes over to bring Kale a card from their classmates and asks her friend if she wants to borrow her dress to attend Gordon's wake where his family and friends will honour his memory, celebrate his life, and give thanks to God for knowing such a wonderful person. An enraged Kale lashes out and says that she will not be going. She questions Mary E. about futilely searching for something out of Gordon's death to celebrate and give thanks for. Later her brother, Ethan visits the basement in search of the plastic chicken that he needs for his stand-up gig later that evening.

=== Season 2 (2001–02) ===
No. overall	No. in season	Title	Directed by	Written by	Original release date
14	1	"The Comeback Issue"	John May	Suzanne Bolch & John May	October 5, 2001
A still grieving Kale is continuing to live in her memories, which causes her to seclude from the rest of the world even more. In order to help Kale move on with her life, Mary E. attempts to convince her friend to attend a zine show. There Kale has the shock of her life when she is visited by an old friend. Meanwhile, Ross begins to freak out and becomes a nervous wreck when he comes into contact with his long time crush, George Lagogianes who is covering the zine show.
15	2	"The Trapped Issue"	John May	Suzanne Bolch & John May	October 12, 2001
With Bill again intruding in different parts of Kale's life by attempting to spend a lot of time with her mother, she attempts to be free of him by departing Toronto for the weekend with her friends. Everything seems to be in order for this mini-vacation as they have finally acquired a car, but there is one problem. An activist/zine writer named Malachi has handcuffed himself to Kale's car to protest air pollution.
16	3	"The Porn Issue"	Ron Murphy	Suzanne Bolch & John May	October 19, 2001
An "Our Hero" reader sends Kale a naked picture of himself wearing cowboy boots. She finds it amusing and decides to bring it to school to show it to her friends. Unbeknownst to her, she accidentally loses it along with one of her zines. The picture falls into the hands of Mr. Minetta who reports Kale to Ms. Terzik-Sykes who in turn calls her parents. At home, Kale expects to be punished by her parents for what happened, but is shocked to find out what her parents really think when she receives another hilarious and embarrassing talk from them. Joey and Mila tell Kale that it is okay for her to look at pornography because they do and it helps them with their love life. Things go from bad to worse for a freaked out Kale as Joey decides to protest the punishment the school has given to his daughter. He wants to make a speech at a parent teacher meeting to discuss the right to free speech by defending and preaching the merits of pornography with the assistance of visual aids. Meanwhile, Ross gets Mr. Minetta to ban public displays of affection resulting in Dalal and Mary E. getting multiple detentions.
17	4	"The Crabby Issue"	Ron Murphy	Suzanne Bolch & John May	October 26, 2001
In an effort to have more excitement in her life and feel like she is making a difference, Kale joins Malachi and his activist friends in building a park in the middle of an intersection to protest the lack of green space. Kale makes the mistake of leaving her palm pilot with all the names and numbers of Malchi's friends, which the police use to apprehend some of them due to the park incident. Meanwhile, happy go luck Mary E. is feeling down due to a cranky clerk at her favourite store refusing to smile and be nice. In order to counter this and brighten the day of many people, Mary E. gets permission from Ms. Terzik-Sykes to have a niceness day at school. Dalal and Ross race against time to put a stop to this niceness day as the two believe that Mary E.'s feelings will end of being hurt if this event backfires.
18	5	"The Psycho Issue"	Merlin Dervisevic	John May & Suzanne Bolch	November 2, 2001
Kale heads to Bill's house to find out whether he was doing drugs while he was sleeping with her because she needs this information to donate blood with Malachi. At his home, she meets his new girlfriend Kayla who seems to share a lot of similar characteristics with Kale, two of them being looks and clothing. Fearing that Bill will treat this girlfriend the same way that he treated her, Kale becomes obsessed and consumed with breaking the two apart. She discovers that this was a big mistake when she sees a side of distraught from Bill that she had never seen before. Meanwhile, Ethan decides to use Kale's basement against her wishes to hold his own comedy workshop to teach aspiring comedians.
19	6	"The Winnie Crundel Issue"	John May	Chris Deacon	November 9, 2001
Kale begins to question the closedness and attitudes of older generations after she gets slut-shamed for having sex with Malachi at a party at Mary E.'s house and she is likened to the legend of Winnie Crundel, a former student of Kale's high school who was also slut-shamed. Meanwhile, Mary E. gets punished by her mother who falsely believe she was the one who had sex at the party.
20	7	"The No Regrets Issue"	John May	Suzanne Bolch & John May	November 16, 2001
When Kale begins noticing that Joey is being more lenient on rules with Ethan who seems to be taking full advantage of the entire situation, she senses something is off and fishy about this whole scenario. With the help of Ross, she seeks to find out what Ethan is holding over their father and discovers something that Joey is both embarrassed and really passionate about. Meanwhile, Mary E. and Dalal are freaking out over the fact that Mila has convinced their parents to volunteer to help out with the school auction. They both believe that the differences in personalities and certain beliefs will cause their parents to clash with each other, which will lead to trouble for their relationship.
21	8	"The Birthday Issue"	Merlin Dervisevic	Suzanne Bolch & John May	November 23, 2001
Kale's 18th birthday celebration goes awry when she wakes up half-naked and tattooed in a hotel on the outskirts of town with a similarly tattooed stranger showering in the washroom.
22	9	"The There's Probably A Word For This In Japanese Issue"	Tim Hamilton	Suzanne Bolch & John May	November 30, 2001
Kale attempts to confront her burdening fears and anxiety that has been amassing itself since she was a child by helping her new friend Rollins teach special needs kids to swim.
23	10	"The Karma Issue"	Daniel J. Murphy	Suzanne Bolch & John May	January 11, 2002
Kale's relationship with Malachi begins to crack and split apart at the seams as she lets him work with her on the zine. Meanwhile, Joey tells an inappropriate joke at his job, which has major repercussions for the entire Stiglic family.
24	11	"The Secrets Issue"	John May	Suzanne Bolch & John May	January 18, 2002
Ross and Kale who are both interested in Rollins set out on a quest to investigate whether he is straight or gay. Meanwhile, a very excited Ethan sells a joke that will air in the opening monologue of The Mike Bullard Show. In the midst of all that is going on, Mila isn't feeling well. So Joey is the one who gets to prepare dinner, and he has something terrifying in mind. The Stiglic kids are going to once again have a taste of Joey's dreaded chili.
25	12	"The D.I.Y Issue"	Daniel J. Murphy	Suzanne Bolch & John May	January 20, 2002
The end of school is drawing near, and the whole gang is planning to work on fixing up the cottage that Ross' grandparents had recently purchased so they could stay there for the summer. Their plans are brought to a screeching halt when Mr. and Mrs. Korolus reject the idea when they fear Ross and Kale having sex, forcing Ross to come out to them. Besides worrying with her friends about not being able to have a great summer vacation, Kale struggles to keep her family from tearing apart due to the lawsuit as pressure from the side of the secretary increases. Also, Mary E. and Kale are shocked to discover the person who is manipulating the people involved in the lawsuit for their own benefit.
26	13	"The Brown Issue"	John May	Suzanne Bolch & John May	January 20, 2002
While making summer plans, Kale rediscovers the joys of life in her city.

== Production ==
Our Hero was created by John May and Suzanne Bolch who also had writing credits on all but two episodes. May also directed a number of episodes. Along with Karen Lee Hall the three formed Heroic Film Company, a Toronto production company that is mainly focused on creating youth oriented television programming.

The series was filmed in the Canadian Broadcasting Centre at Front St and John St in Toronto, Ontario. To save time and money, there were always two episodes shot at once.

Some still and Super 8 photography for the zine sequences was shot with a very small crew along the city's streets.

== Awards ==
=== Wins ===
- 2003 – Writers Guild of Canada Award for Writing ("The Karma Issue")
- 2002 – Writers Guild of Canada Award for Writing ("The Unresolved Issue")
- 2001 – Writers Guild of Canada Award for Writing ("The Shallow Issue")

=== Nominations ===
- 2002 – Canadian Comedy Awards – Best Performance by a Female - Television for Jeanie Calleja
- 2002 – Canadian Comedy Awards – Best Performance by a Male - Television for Vik Sahay
- 2002 – Canadian Comedy Awards – Writing for TV Series for Suzanne Bolch & John May
- 2002 – Gemini Awards – Best Children's or Youth Fiction Program or Series
- 2002 – Gemini Awards – Best Writing in a Children's or Youth Program and Series
- 2001 – Gemini Awards – Best Original Music Score for a Dramatic Series
