= Made / Nous =

- Formation: 2019
- Type: Advertising campaign
- Purpose: "MADE | NOUS celebrates the works of Canadian creators in film, television, video games and digital entertainment, both here and around the world."
- Parent organization: Canada Media Fund
- Website: made-nous.ca

Made | Nous is a promotional campaign focused on the Canadian entertainment and media industry and Canadian content, with the goal of promoting Canadian creators in film, television, video games, and digital entertainment.

The campaign includes a website that recommends Canadian content to watch and where to find it online.

== History ==
=== 2019 ===
Created in collaboration with the Canada Media Fund, Telefilm Canada and other industry partners, the Made | Nous campaign was launched in a 60-second ad broadcast during the 2019 Academy Awards ceremony on February 24, 2019. The campaign was then officially launched on February 25, 2019, with 30-second ads airing that day.

As part of the launch, the Made | Nous logo was added to transit posters and social media graphics for the films Deadpool and Arrival, and the TV ads were voiced by Canadian actor Christopher Plummer in English and Karine Vanasse in French.

In the same year, Made | Nous began to sponsor the Radius Award, a special award presented at the Canadian Screen Awards to honour emerging Canadian actors who have broken through to international success.

=== 2020 ===
In April 2020, during the COVID-19 pandemic, the Made | Nous campaign launched a Canada-wide virtual road trip, with Canadian comedian Jay Baruchel and actor Marc-Andre Grondin tweeting a recommended Canadian TV show or movie every day that month.

In May 2020, actors Simu Liu and Maitreyi Ramakrishnan became ambassadors for Made | Nous, working with the campaign to highlight notable Asian Canadians as part of Asian and South Asian Heritage month.

Between May and July, Quebec talent Sarah-Jeanne Labrosse, Debbie Lynch-White, the animation duo Bianca Gervais and Sébastien Diaz, and Jean-Sébastien Girard collaborated with Made | Nous to present four Facebook trivia nights focused on Quebec television and cinema, with a different host presenting each week.

Every day in June 2020, Made | Nous posted historical and groundbreaking moments of love from Canadian LGBTQ2S+ film and television, culminating in a video compilation called "30 Ways to Say I Love You" that was broadcast during Toronto's virtual Pride parade.

To celebrate National Indigenous History Month and National Indigenous Peoples Day on June 21, Made | Nous ambassador Kawennáhere Devery Jacobs used her Instagram channel to highlight Indigenous creators and the challenges the community faces in the entertainment industry.

With Canadian actor and host Tanner Zipchen, the campaign also launched a Summer Blockbuster Drive-In Series in July 2020, which celebrated Canadian contributions to blockbuster films by featuring those films at drive-in theatres across the country. Actor Will Arnett and filmmaker David Cronenberg filmed special introductions for the series.

=== 2021 ===
In April 2021, Made | Nous launched #SeekMore, an incarnation of their campaign, during the final episode of Canadian television show Kim's Convenience. Seek More is supported by Simu Liu, Shamier Anderson, Kawennáhere Devery Jacobs, Mélissa Bédard, Adib Alkhalidey, Cynthia Wu-Maheux, Amanda Brugel, Hamza Haq, Kaniehtiio Horn, Maitreyi Ramakrishnan, and Cassandra James.

The launch was promoted by Prime Minister Justin Trudeau to his 5.6 million Twitter followers.

With a focus on underrepresented and marginalized voices, the #SeekMore campaign encourages Canadians to "seek out people from a wide array of racial backgrounds and lived experiences in the entertainment world—the actors, filmmakers, writers, and other storytellers shaping television, film, and gaming in this country."

The organization participated in an episode of the second season of Canada's Drag Race, offering a $5,000 prize to the challenge winner and sponsoring a "Made in Canada" runway theme devoted to Canadian entertainment icons.
