= Redoubt (disambiguation) =

Redoubt may refer to:

- Redoubt, a physical fortification
- American Redoubt, a political migration movement
- Redoubt, a locality in the Mbizana Local Municipality in the Eastern Cape, South Africa
- Mount Redoubt (disambiguation)
- National redoubt, a defensive strategic concept
- Redoubt, or Redut PMC, a Russian private military company
