= Read Out! =

- Genre: Talk show
- Starring: Mathieu Chantelois (host)
- Country of origin: Canada
- Original language: English
- No. of seasons: 2

Production
- Running time: 22 minutes

Original release
- Network: PrideVision TV
- Release: April 18, 2003

Read Out! was a Canadian English language talk show. Read Out! premiered on April 18, 2003 at 7:30 pm EST on Canadian digital cable specialty channel, PrideVision, now known as OUTtv.

== Premise ==
Read Out! is a talk show where host Mathieu Chantelois interviews LGBT authors and discusses their work and their lives.
