= Call Me Mother season 2 =

Second season of Call Me Mother

Call Me Mother
- Season 2
- Promotional poster for season two
- Hosted by: Dallas Dixon
- Coaches: Peppermint; Crystal; Barbada de Barbades
- No. of contestants: 15
- Winner: Weebee
- Winning coach: Barbada de Barbades
- Runner-up: Jessie Précieuse Makayla Couture Pepper
- No. of episodes: 9

Release
- Original network: OutTV
- Original release: October 26 – December 21, 2022

Season chronology
- ← Previous; Season 1

The second season of Call Me Mother premiered on October 26, 2022. The cast was announced on September 23, 2022. All three drag mothers from the first season, Peppermint, Crystal and Barbada de Barbades, are returning; Farra N. Hyte is also returning as a non-mentoring judge, alongside new judge Landon Cider in place of the first season's Miss Butterfly.

The prize package for the winner includes a seven-night stay for two at the Almar Resort luxury LGBTQ+ beachfront experience in Puerto Vallarta, Mexico, courtesy of Air Canada Vacations, a year's supply of Rimmel Cosmetics, a year's supply of Wella Professionals hair product and the chance to be the Face of Wella Face at Pride Toronto, and a cash prize of $25,000, courtesy of Freddie.

The winner of the second season of Call Me Mother was Weebee, with Jessie Précieuse, Makayla Couture, and Pepper as runners-up.

== Contestants ==
Ages, names and cities stated are at time of filming.

Contestants of Call Me Mother season 2 and their backgrounds
Contestant	Age	Hometown	House	Outcome
Weebee	25	Vancouver, British Columbia	Harmonie	Winner
Jessie Précieuse	27	Montreal, Quebec	Glass	Runners-up
Makayla Couture	19	Toronto, Ontario	Dulcet	Runners-up
Pepper	45	Edmonton, Alberta	Harmonie	Runners-up
Justin Abit	41	Delta, British Columbia	Dulcet	5th place
Jenna Seppa	22	Sturgeon Falls, Ontario	Harmonie	6th place
Phoenix Black	27	London, Ontario	Glass	7th place
Imarra	29	Toronto, Ontario	Dulcet	8th place
Mya Foxx	28	Halifax, Nova Scotia	Dulcet	10th place
Seyoncé Knows	35	Toronto, Ontario	Glass	10th place
Miss Shay Dee	25	Toronto, Ontario	Harmonie	12th place
Stony Mac	23	Saskatoon, Saskatchewan	Glass	12th place
Champagna	36	Toronto, Ontario	—N/a	15th place
Kingchella	23	Ajax, Ontario	—N/a	15th place
Newfound Lad	28	St. John's, Newfoundland and Labrador	—N/a	15th place

== Contestant progress ==
Legend:

Weebee won Call Me Mother season 2.
Jessie Précieuse, Makayla Couture, and Pepper were the runners-up.
WIN indicates that the House or contestant scored the highest in the challenge.
SAFE indicates that the house or contestant was declared safe by the judges.
BTM (Bottom) indicates that the house was up for elimination.
ELIM (Eliminated) indicates that the contestant was eliminated.
Dulcet indicates that the contestant was chosen to be in the House of Dulcet by Peppermint.
Glass indicates that the contestant was chosen to be in the House of Glass by Crystal.
Harmonie indicates that the contestant was chosen to be in the House of Harmonie by Barbada.

Progress of contestants including rank/position in each episode
Contestant	Episode								
Contestant	1	2	3	4	5	6	7	8	9
Weebee	Harmonie	BTM	WIN	WIN	SAFE	BTM	WIN	Guest	Winner
Jessie Précieuse	Glass	BTM	BTM	SAFE	WIN	SAFE	SAFE	Guest	Runner-up
Makayla Couture	Dulcet	WIN	BTM	BTM	BTM	BTM	BTM	Guest	Runner-up
Pepper	Harmonie	BTM	WIN	WIN	SAFE	WIN	BTM	Guest	Runner-up
Justin Abit	Dulcet	WIN	BTM	BTM	SAFE	WIN	ELIM	Guest	
Jenna Seppa	Harmonie	BTM	WIN	WIN	SAFE	ELIM		Guest	
Phoenix Black	Glass	BTM	BTM	SAFE	ELIM			Guest	
Imarra	Dulcet	WIN	BTM	ELIM				Guest	
Mya Foxx	Dulcet	WIN	ELIM					Guest	
Seyoncé Knows	Glass	BTM	ELIM					Guest	
Miss Shay Dee	Harmonie	ELIM						Guest	
Stony Mac	Glass	ELIM						Guest	
Champagna	ELIM							Guest	
Kingchella	ELIM							Guest	
Newfound Lad	ELIM							Guest	

=== Contestant notes ===
Makayla Couture previously appeared on the second season of Canada's Drag Race, as the makeover partner of Icesis Couture in the "Prom" episode. She was subsequently a full competitor in the fifth season of Canada's Drag Race in 2024.

Mya Foxx would later go on to compete on the sixth season of Canada's Drag Race. After winning the Snatch Game in episode 3, she would ultimately be eliminated alongside Velma Jones in episode 6's lip sync challenge in joint 7th/8th place.

Jessie Précieuse regularly appears, under her real name Alex Verville, as a television meteorologist on MétéoMédia, the French-language version of The Weather Network. In 2021, the network chose to celebrate Pride Month by having Verville present several weather segments in drag as Jessie Précieuse.

== Episodes ==
No. overall	No. in season	Title	Original release date
9	1	"Adoptions"	October 26, 2022
The drag artists participate in three rounds of adoption challenges to be selected by one of the three drag mothers: a look challenge, a talent challenge and a tea time conversation with the mothers; however, with only 4 spots on each team and three drag mothers, three of the fifteen artists will not be selected.: Adopted into the House of Dulcet: Mya Foxx, Makayla Couture, Imarra (Talent Round), Justin Abit (Tea Time Round); Adopted into the House of Glass: Phoenix Black, Stony Mac, Jessie Précieuse (Talent Round), Seyoncé Knows (Tea Time Round); Adopted into the House of Harmonie: Pepper, Weebee, Miss Shay Dee (Talent Round), Jenna Seppa (Tea Time Round); Eliminated: Champagna, Kingchella and Newfound Lad
10	2	"Family Day"	November 2, 2022
Challenge Winner: House of Dulcet; Eliminated: Miss Shay Dee and Stony Mac
11	3	"Safety Dance"	November 9, 2022
Challenge Winner: House of Harmonie; Eliminated: Mya Foxx and Seyoncé Knows
12	4	"Of Monsters and Media"	November 16, 2022
Challenge Winner: House of Harmonie; Eliminated: Imarra
13	5	"Might Have Been Me"	November 23, 2022
Challenge Winner: Jessie Précieuse; Eliminated: Phoenix Black
14	6	"Leave It On The Stage"	November 30, 2022
Challenge Winner: Justin Abit and Pepper; Eliminated: Jenna Seppa
15	7	"Sell It"	December 7, 2022
Challenge Winner: Weebee; Eliminated: Justin Abit
16	8	"Family Reunion"	December 14, 2022
17	9	"Mother of All Finales"	December 21, 2022
Winner: Weebee; Runners-up: Jessie Précieuse, Makayla Couture and Pepper
