= Paolo Perfección =

Canadian entertainer

- Occupations: Drag performer; social media personality

TikTok information
- Page: paoloperfeccion
- Followers: 198,900
- Last updated: October 30, 2026

Paolo Perfección is a Canadian drag performer and social media personality who gained wider recognition as a contestant on the sixth season of Canada's Drag Race. Prior to competing on television, Paolo Perfección primarily built a following on TikTok and YouTube.

== Early life and career ==
Paolo Perfección began sewing at age 12, encouraged by his family, particularly his grandmother. He later attended fashion school for design. His stage name originated in high school, when a Spanish teacher defended him against bullying, calling him "Perfección", a phrase he later adopted professionally.

During the COVID-19 pandemic, Paolo Perfección expanded his creative practice to include makeup, wig styling, and self-produced photo shoots featuring his own designs. This period marked the development of his drag persona and his emergence as an online creator, gaining attention for character-driven content and comedic videos on platforms such as TikTok and YouTube. In November 2025, Paolo Perfección was announced as one of the contestants on the sixth season of the drag competition show Canada's Drag Race. He was the first contestant eliminated from the season after landing in the bottom two during an advertising challenge and losing a lip sync against fellow contestant Sami Landri.

== Personal life ==
Paolo Perfección is based in Montreal, Quebec, and uses she/her pronouns in drag and he/him pronouns out of drag.

== Filmography ==
=== Television ===
Year	Title	Role	Notes	Ref.
2018	Un dîner presque parfait	Himself (out of drag)	Host of the week	
2025	CTV News	Himself (in drag)	Guest	
2025	Canada's Drag Race	Himself	Contestant, season 6, episodes 1 and 2	
2025	CP24 Breakfast	Himself (in drag)	Guest	
2026	Canada's Drag Race	Himself	Contestant, season 7	

== See also ==
- List of drag queens
- List of people from Montreal
