= Tracy & Martina: Goin' Out West =

- Directed by: Brendan Langelle Lyle
- Screenplay by: Brendan Langelle Lyle; Justine Williamson; Greg Vardy
- Produced by: Brendan Langelle Lyle; Justine Williamson; Greg Vardy
- Starring: Justine Williamson; Greg Vardy
- Cinematography: Brendan Langelle Lyle
- Edited by: Brendan Langelle Lyle
- Production company: Club Red Productions
- Release date: October 18, 2025 (Charlottetown)
- Running time: 90 minutes
- Country: Canada
- Language: English

Tracy & Martina: Goin' Out West is a Canadian mockumentary comedy film, directed by Brendan Langelle Lyle and released in 2025. The film stars Justine Williamson and Greg Vardy as Tracy and Martina, two working class friends from Cape Breton Island who travel to Alberta to perform as an opening act for the indie rock band Slowcoaster, only for events to go awry.

Lyle also appears in the film in a small role as Tracy and Martina's cameraman.

== Background ==
Tracy (Williamson) and Martina (Vardy) are an established comedy duo, who have built the characters' brand for a number of years on social media platforms, as well as undertaking national comedy tours, and in the Swearnet web series Tracy & Martina's Dirty Deeds. They also cohost the podcast Shootin' the Shit, which consists of the two characters talking among themselves as well as with guests including drag queens Priyanka, Mya Foxx and Sami Landri, actors Robb Wells, Patrick Roach and John Paul Tremblay, comedian Trevor Boris, writer Rachel Reid and musicians Goldie Boutilier, Ria Mae and Jimmy Rankin.

They did not originally envision Goin' Out West as a film, and instead it was originally conceived as simply a casual shoot to get social media footage of them out and around Fort McMurray during a tour stop, before they decided to add narrative structure by writing and shooting a film to explain how the characters got to Alberta in the first place.

== Distribution ==
The film debuted in October 2025 at the Charlottetown Film Festival. It was later screened at festivals including the Available Light Film Festival, and the Calgary Underground Film Festival.

At the 2026 Inside Out Film and Video Festival, it received an honorable mention from the Best Canadian Film award jury.

It went into commercial release in 2026, beginning in Nova Scotia.

== Critical response ==
Kurt Halfyard of Screen Anarchy placed the film firmly in the tradition of Canadian hoser comedy, alongside totems such as Goin' Down the Road, Strange Brew, FUBAR, The Dirties and Trailer Park Boys.

For Exclaim!, Rachel Ho called the film "funny as shit", writing that "Williamson and Vardy (also co-writers of the film with Lyle, and producers) know exactly what their fans want and they deliver it unapologetically. Similar to Matt Johnson's Nirvanna the Band the Show the Movie earlier this year, Goin' Out West has little regard for how the comedy will work for those outside Canada, or outside the Atlantic region for that matter. The film has been made with a particular audience in mind, and thanks to Williamson, Vardy and Lyle's purposeful ignorance of periphery, Goin' Out West serves as a prime example of Canadian comedy at its best."
