= Not Sorry Aboot It =

Not Sorry About It may refer to:

- "Not Sorry Aboot It", an episode on Canada's Drag Race season 1
- "Not Sorry Aboot It", an episode on Canada's Drag Race season 6
