= Weebee =

Drag performer

- Born: October 5, 1996 (age 29)
- Occupations: Drag performer; Teacher
- Television: Call Me Mother (season 2)

Weebee is a drag performer who won the second season of Call Me Mother.

== Personal life ==
Weebee is based in Vancouver, British Columbia. Outside of drag, Webber is a teacher.

== Filmography ==
- Call Me Mother (season 2)

== See also ==
- List of drag queens
- List of people from Vancouver
