= Jessie Précieuse =

Drag queen artist

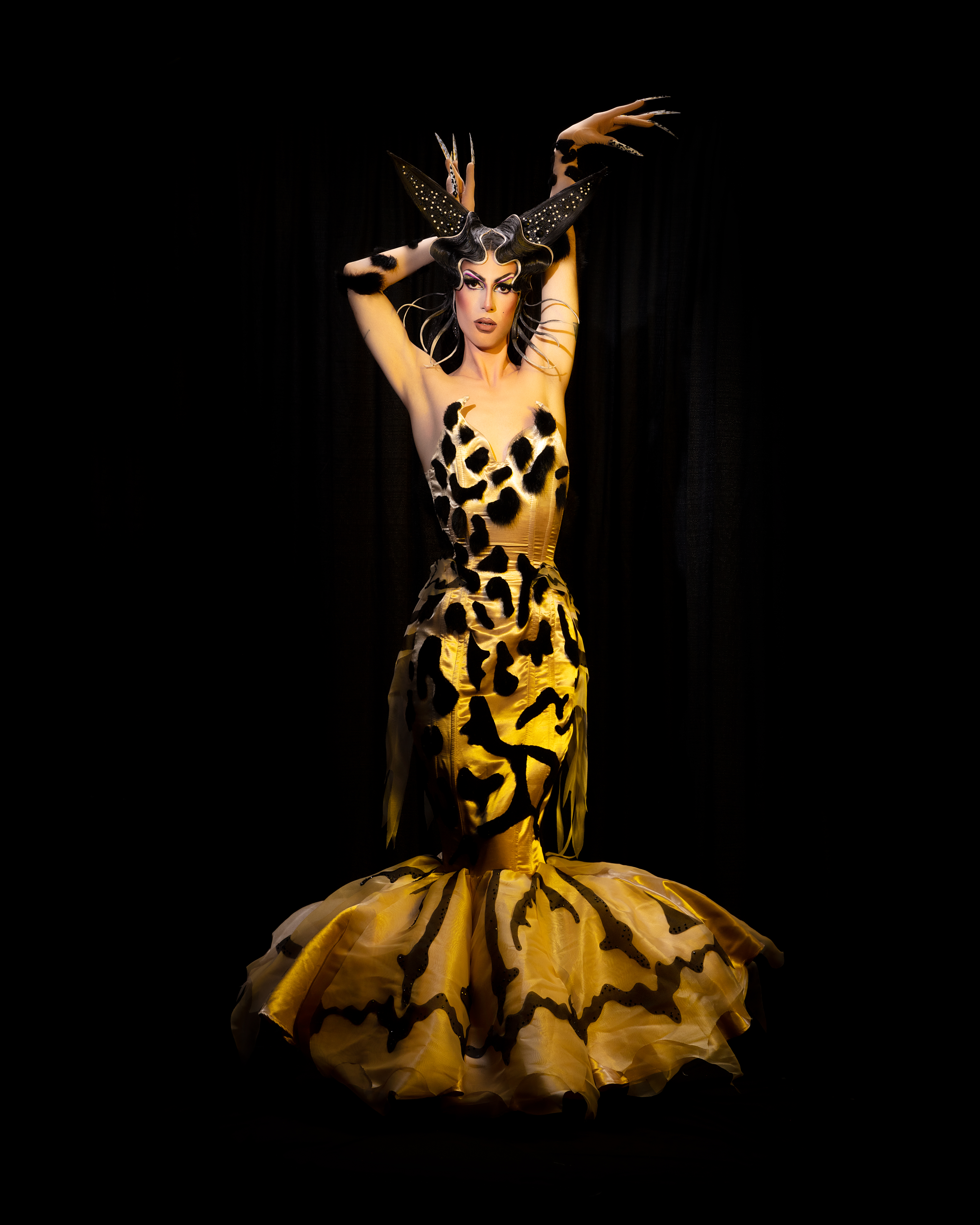
- Jessie Precieuse at Rendez-vous de la drag, Montreal 2023
- Born: Alex Verville; September 10, 1994 (age 32); Sorel-Tracy, Quebec, Canada
- Occupations: Drag queen, Host, Producer
- Years active: 2020–present
- Television: Call Me Mother (season 2), MétéoMédia
- Website: alexverville.com/jessieprecieuse

Jessie Précieuse is the stage name of Alex Verville, a Montreal-based drag queen.

Verville has been a weather presenter for MétéoMédia, the French-language counterpart of The Weather Network. Although he normally presents the weather as himself, he has sometimes presented the weather in drag as Jessie Précieuse during Montreal Pride. He is also a regular contributor to Noovo Info's Friday 5 p.m. news segment, where he discusses current issues related to weather and climate.

Verville began experimenting with drag during the lockdowns associated with the COVID-19 pandemic, before making her television debut on MétéoMédia in 2021. She gained further prominence as a finalist on the second season of the drag competition series Call Me Mother in 2022.

== Early life ==
Précieuse was born and raised in Sorel-Tracy, a small city in southwestern Quebec, Canada. They studied at Cégep de Jonquière in Saguenay, Québec before moving to Montreal, Quebec to complete their bachelor's studies in communications at the Université du Québec à Montréal.

== Career ==
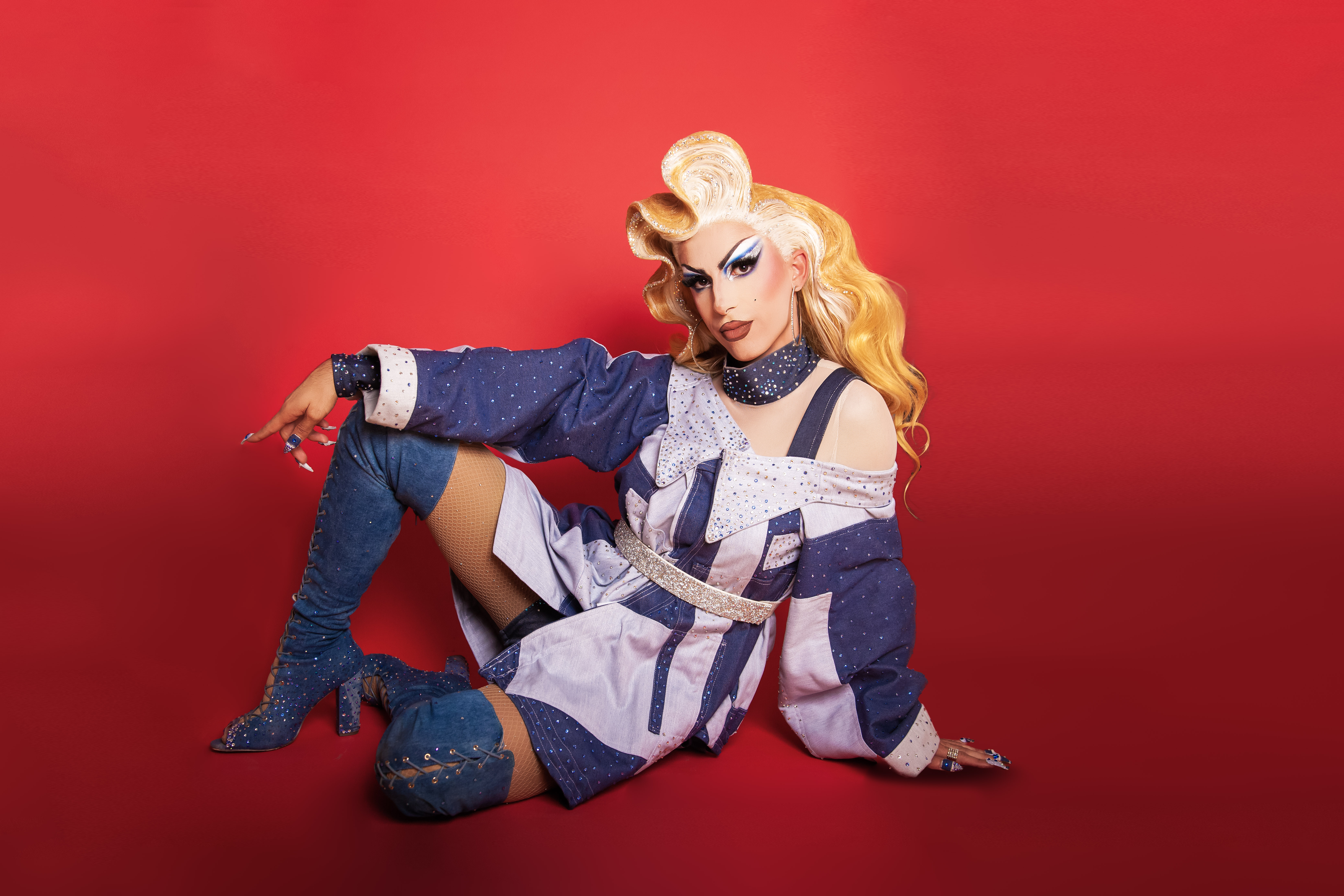
Jessie Precieuse in MajestiX outfit, "Fierté Montréal" 2023

After competing in the Drag Moi! competition at Cabaret Mado, Jessie broke out on the Montreal drag scene. In 2022, Jessie competed on the second season of OUTtv's Call Me Mother, ultimately finishing as runner-up.

In 2023, Précieuse starred in Majestix, a celebration of the city’s local drag talent on the MainStage of Montreal Pride. The same year, on October 12, 2023, she opened for Chappel Roan during her "The Midwest Princess Tour" at Théâtre Fairmont, alongside local drag artists Bobépine and Denim.

Jessie Précieuse is the host and producer of the Grand Championnat National de Drag de Montréal, an annual drag competition that brings together three teams of drag kings and queens in an outdoor showdown. Held on Sainte-Catherine Street to mark the opening of the Montreal Village’s pedestrian zone for the summer since 2023.

In 2025, Précieuse headlined the family event Heure du conte : Jessie Précieuse at the Quartier général de l’entrepreneuriat in Sherbrooke. The inclusive storytelling activity, part of the Fière la Fête festival, invited children and families to celebrate diversity through a colorful story hour. That same year, she collaborated with Mixbus Studio to co-lead Sherbrooke’s Pride parade and to host the closing drag show for the Fière la Fête celebrations, earning praise for an energetic and community-centered performance.

== Filmography ==
=== Podcasts ===
List of podcast credits, with selected details
Year	Title	Show	Role	Notes	Ref.
2025	Sexe Oral en cavale S02 - Drag Queen (#2)	Sexe Oral	Guest	Episode 2	
2025	Jessie Précieuse replume le Pokémon	Full Plume	Guest	Episode 73	
2024	Séries Éliminatoires ft. Jessie Précieuse	Crashe ton Thé	Guest	Episode 3	
