= Saltina Shaker =

Canadian drag performer and social media personality (born 1995)

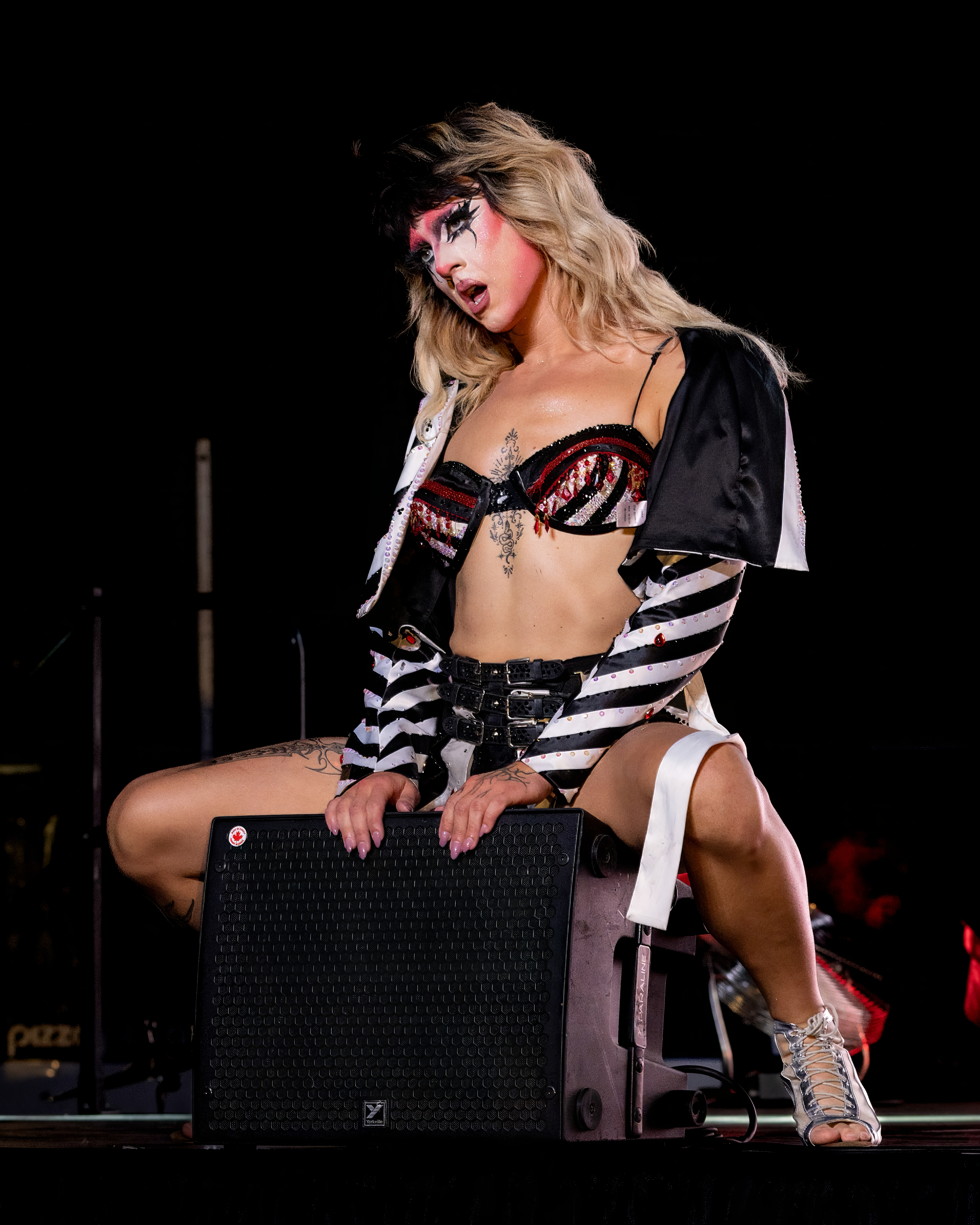
- Saltina Shaker performing in 2025
- Born: Jesse Lesniowski; April 12, 1995 (age 30)
- Education: University of Ottawa
- Occupations: Drag performer; social media personality

TikTok information
- Page: saltinashaker
- Followers: 2.3 million

Saltina Shaker is the stage name of Jesse Lesniowski (born April 12, 1995), a Canadian drag performer and social media personality. A disabled queen, she is known for her beauty and body positivity content on social media, and has over 2 million followers on TikTok. She competed on the sixth season of Canada's Drag Race.

== Early life and education ==
Lesniowski was raised in Rockland, Ontario. In July 2011, at the age of 16, Lesniowski and his then-girlfriend were involved in a severe car accident near Belleville while driving from Toronto to Ottawa on Highway 401. Although there were no casualties, the two were left with severe injuries and were taken to a hospital in Kingston. As a result, his education had to be delayed by several years. Nonetheless, he finished his high school education remotely before attending the University of Ottawa, majoring in environmental science, as he was able to take the classes remotely. In 2015, he founded the Environmental Association of uOttawa. He graduated in 2020 with an honors Bachelor of Science degree in environmental science, geochemistry and ecotoxicology, and afterwards began pursuing his master's degree in environmental sustainability.

== Career ==
Saltina Shaker is known for her online beauty content on social media, especially TikTok and Instagram, garnering over 3 million followers across all platforms, making her the most followed Canadian drag queen on social media. She has been crowned Ms. Capital Pride.

In November 2025, Saltina Shaker was announced as a contestant on the sixth season of the drag competition show Canada's Drag Race. She placed sixth and was eliminated after landing in the bottom two during a design challenge, where she lost a lip sync against fellow contestant PM.

== Personal life ==
Lesniowski is based in Ottawa, and uses she/her pronouns in drag and he/they pronouns out of drag. Although he mostly recovered from the accident, he suffers chronic pain, severe digestive issues, and fatigue as a result, and has to keep painkillers with him at all times.

== Filmography ==
- Canada's Drag Race (2025)
