= Canada's Drag Race season 7 =

2026 season of television series

Canada's Drag Race
- Season 7
- Hosted by: Brooke Lynn Hytes
- Judges: Brooke Lynn Hytes; Traci Melchor; Carson Kressley; Hollywood Jade; Sarain Fox
- No. of contestants: 12

Release
- Original network: Crave
- Original release: November 19, 2026

Season chronology
- ← Previous; Season 6

The seventh season of Canada's Drag Race premiered on November 19, 2026.

== Contestants ==
Canada's Drag Race season 7 contestants and their backgrounds (Note: All ages, names, with hometowns, and outcome are stated at time of filming.)
Contestant	Age	Hometown	Outcome
Batty Banks	31	Vancouver, British Colombia	TBA
Bliss	25	Vancouver, British Colombia	TBA
Carlotta Carlisle	38	Deer Lake, Newfoundland and Labrador	TBA
Chiquita Mére	31	Shediac, New Brunswick	TBA
Gravy	22	St. John’s, Newfoundland and Labrador	TBA
Guy Anabella	34	Toronto, Ontario	TBA
Kara Juku	31	Vancouver, British Colombia	TBA
Madee Lovegood	30	Toronto, Ontario	TBA
Moh Dafok	36	Montreal, Quebec	TBA
Paolo Perfección (Note: Paolo Perfección originally competed on season 6, placing twelfth.)	26	Montreal, Quebec	TBA
Paris Matik	24	Toronto, Ontario	TBA
Pheromone Killz	30	Edmonton, Alberta	TBA

Footnotes

== Contestant progress ==
Legend:

WIN indicates that the contestant won the challenge.
LGL (Leg Up Loser) indicates that Paolo Perfeccion was chosen by Bliss, the challenge winner, to lip sync for a leg-up advantage, but lost the lip sync to win it.
SAFE indicates that the contestant was declared safe by the judges.
BTM (Bottom) indicates that the contestant was up for elimination.
ELIM (Eliminated) indicates that the contestant was eliminated.

Contestants progress with placements in each episode
Contestant	Episode	
Contestant	1	2
Batty Banks	SAFE	TBA
Bliss	WIN	TBA
Carlotta Carlisle	SAFE	TBA
Chiquita Mére	SAFE	TBA
Gravy	SAFE	TBA
Guy Anabella	SAFE	TBA
Kara Juku	SAFE	TBA
Madee Lovegood	SAFE	TBA
Moh Dafok	SAFE	TBA
Paolo Perfección	LGL	TBA
Paris Matik	SAFE	TBA
Pheromone Killz	SAFE	TBA

== Lip syncs ==
Legend:

The contestant won the lip sync to win an advantage.

Episode	Top contestants			Song	Winner
1	Bliss	vs.	Paolo Perfección	"Sports Car" (Tate McRae)	Bliss
Episode	Bottom contestants			Song	Eliminated
2	TBA	vs.	TBA	TBA	TBA

== Guest judges ==
- Sasha Colby, winner of RuPaul's Drag Race season 15
- Aurora James, fashion designer and businesswoman
- bbno$, rapper and songwriter
- Joel Kim Booster, actor and comedian
- Josh Ramsay, singer and songwriter
- Nicky Doll, host of Drag Race France and contestant from RuPaul's Drag Race season 12
- Slayyyter, singer and songwriter
- Wally Baram, actress and comedian

== Episodes ==
No. overall	No. in season	Title	Original release date
57	1	"Not Safe for Werk"	November 19, 2026
Guest Judge: Sasha Colby; Alternating Judges: Hollywood Jade and Sarain Fox; Main Challenge: Write and record a verse and star in the music video for the song "And Werk!", which also features an acted intro.; Runway Theme: Great Gowns, Beautiful Gowns; Top Two: Bliss and Paolo Perfección; Lip-Sync Song: "Sports Car" by Tate McRae; Challenge Winner: Bliss; Challenge Prize: $5,000 courtesy of TDF Presents and a chance to lipsync for an advantage; Eliminated: None
58	2	TBA	November 26, 2026
Guest Judge: TBA; Main Challenge: TBA; Runway Theme: TBA; Challenge Winner: TBA; Challenge Prize: TBA; Bottom Two: TBD; Lip-Sync Song: TBA; Eliminated: TBD; Farewell Message: TBA
