= Chiquita Mére =

Xénia Gould
- Born: August 20, 1994 (age 32); Shediac, New Brunswick, Canada
- Other names: Xénia, Chiquita Mére, Jass-Saint Bourque
- Education: Mount Allison University
- Occupations: Actress, activist, comedian, director, drag performer, multidisciplinary artist, poet, playwright
- Years active: 2008–present

Xénia Gould (born August 20, 1994), known simply as Xénia, or by the drag names Chiquita Mére (Note: Also spelled as Chiquita Mare) and Jass-Sainte Bourque, is a Canadian actress, activist, comedian, director, drag performer, multidisciplinary artist, poet, and playwright.

She first gained prominence for her character "Jass-Sainte Bourque", winning the title of Cultural Personality of 2018 from Acadian newspaper L'Acadie Nouvelle.

As Chiquita Mére she was featured in the CBC Gem docu-series Canada's a Drag in 2020 and is competing in the seventh season of Canada's Drag Race.

== Early life and education ==
Gould was born on August 20, 1994 in Shediac, New Brunswick. She is Acadian, and was raised in Shediac. She studied drama at Mount Allison University in Sackville, New Brunswick. Since childhood she has been involved in comedy, writing, and character creation.

== Career ==
=== Acting and filmmaking ===
Gould appeared in the short films A Lion's Tale (2008) and The Bannisters (2013). In 2015 she appeared as "Stevie" in the film Owl River Runners. In 2019 she appeared in five episodes of the ICI Radio-Canada Télé limited series Conséquences.

In 2018, at the Festival international du cinéma francophone en Acadie, she directed two short films entitled Posy and Clay. At the 2021 edition of the same festival, her film Mona, which follows a young drag queen (played by Samuel Landry) auditioning for America's Next Top Model, won the Vague Award for best Acadian short film.

=== Drag ===
Gould began her drag career with the character Jass-Sainte Bourque, a gender-ambiguous character which speaks Chiac and "gives a voice to the queer Acadian community". In 2017 she appeared at Le Festival Acadie Rock's Cabaret Factum. In 2018 she was awarded the title of Cultural Personality of 2018 from L'Acadie Nouvelle. As Jass-Sainte, she appeared in Radio-Canada's radio show Le réveil, performed at ZooFest in Montreal, and opened for Mado Lamotte. In 2019 she hosted the National Acadian Day show for the World Acadian Congress. Gould has since put the character on hold since October 2019. In 2020 she appeared in the season 2 episode "Plaire, aimer et courir vite" of the series Les Newbies as a fictionalized version of Jass-Sainte.

Gould then began performing as the character Chiquita Méré. In 2020, she hosted the First Ever Acadian Drag Ball and was profiled in an episode of the third season of the CBC Gem docu-series Canada's a Drag. In 2021 she appeared in the music video for Lisa Leblanc's song "Pourquoi faire aujourd'hui".

In early October 2026, she was featured on Adieu Narcisse's song "Montréal". Later that month, Gould was announced as a contestant on the seventh season of Canada's Drag Race.

=== Writing and comedy ===
Out of drag, she has performed stand-up comedy, winning the amateur comedy contest at the HubCab festival in 2018, allowing her to participate in the Rendez-vous de la Francophonie gala.

== Personal life ==
As of 2017 Gould was based in Moncton, New Brunswick.

Gould is a transgender woman, having come out publicly in fall 2023.

== Discography ==
=== Singles ===
- "Beatiful Things (chiac)" (2026)

=== Other songs ===
- "Montréal" (Adieu Narcisse featuring Chiquita Mére) (2026)

== Filmography ==
=== Film ===
| Year | Title | Role | Notes |
|---|---|---|---|
| 2008 | A Lion's Tale | Davis Wells | Short film |
| 2013 | The Bannisters | Daniel Bannister | Short film |
| 2015 | Owl River Runners | Stevie | Feature film |
| 2018 | Clay | —N/a | Short film, director |
| 2019 | Posy | —N/a | Short film, director |
| 2020 | CL(M)AM | —N/a | Short film, director |
| 2020 | JOLT | —N/a | Short film, director |
| 2021 | Mona | —N/a | Short film, director, won Best Acadian Short Film at FICFA |

=== Television ===
| Year | Title | Role | Notes |
|---|---|---|---|
| 2019 | Conséquences | Alexandre Duguay | |
| 2020 | Les Newbies | Jass-Sainte | Episode: "Plaire, aimer et courir vite" |
| 2020 | Canada's a Drag | Self (as Chiquita Méré) | Docu-series |
| 2026 | Canada's Drag Race | Self (as Chiquita Méré) | Season 7 |

=== Music video ===
| Year | Song | Artist | Role |
|---|---|---|---|
| 2021 | "Pourquoi faire aujourd'hui" | Lisa Leblanc | Self (as Chiquita Méré) |

== Awards ==
| Presenter | Award | Year | Work | Status |
|---|---|---|---|---|
| L'Acadie Nouvelle | Cultural Personality of the Year | 2018 | Self (as Jass-Sainte Bourque) | Won |
