= Mya Foxx =

Canadian drag performer

- Born: Dillon Ross; 1993 or 1994 (age 32–33)
- Occupation: Drag performer
- Known for: Call Me Mother (season 2); Canada's Drag Race (season 6)

Mya Foxx is the stage name of Dillon Ross, a Canadian drag performer who competed on the second season of Call Me Mother and sixth season of Canada's Drag Race. She is based in Halifax, Nova Scotia.

== Early life and career ==
Dillon Ross was raised in Sydney, Nova Scotia, a coastal city on Cape Breton Island, until moving to Halifax to attend college. He graduated with degrees in human resource management and marketing in addition to a minor in French from the Sobey School of Business at Saint Mary's University in 2017. Outside of performance, he works as a human resources manager for Halifax-based non-profit organization Sport Nova Scotia.

Ross performs in drag as Mya Foxx. She began performing onstage during the COVID-19 pandemic and has cited her inspirations to be Mya, The Pussycat Dolls and Ashanti. As Mya Foxx, Ross competed on the second season of Call Me Mother, making her the first queen of Inuk descent on any televised drag competition.

== Personal life ==
Ross is of Scottish, Romanian, and Inuk heritage and is a fluent speaker of English and French. His Inuit ancestry comes from his maternal grandfather and is primarily from the community of St. Lewis, NunatuKavut, with one family line being traced back to Nain, Nunatsiavut. He is openly gay, and came out to his family at the age of 18. Ross uses she/her pronouns in drag and he/him pronouns out of drag.

== Filmography ==
=== Television ===
- Call Me Mother (2022)
- Canada's Drag Race (2025)
