= Velma Jones =

Canadian drag performer (born 1985/86)

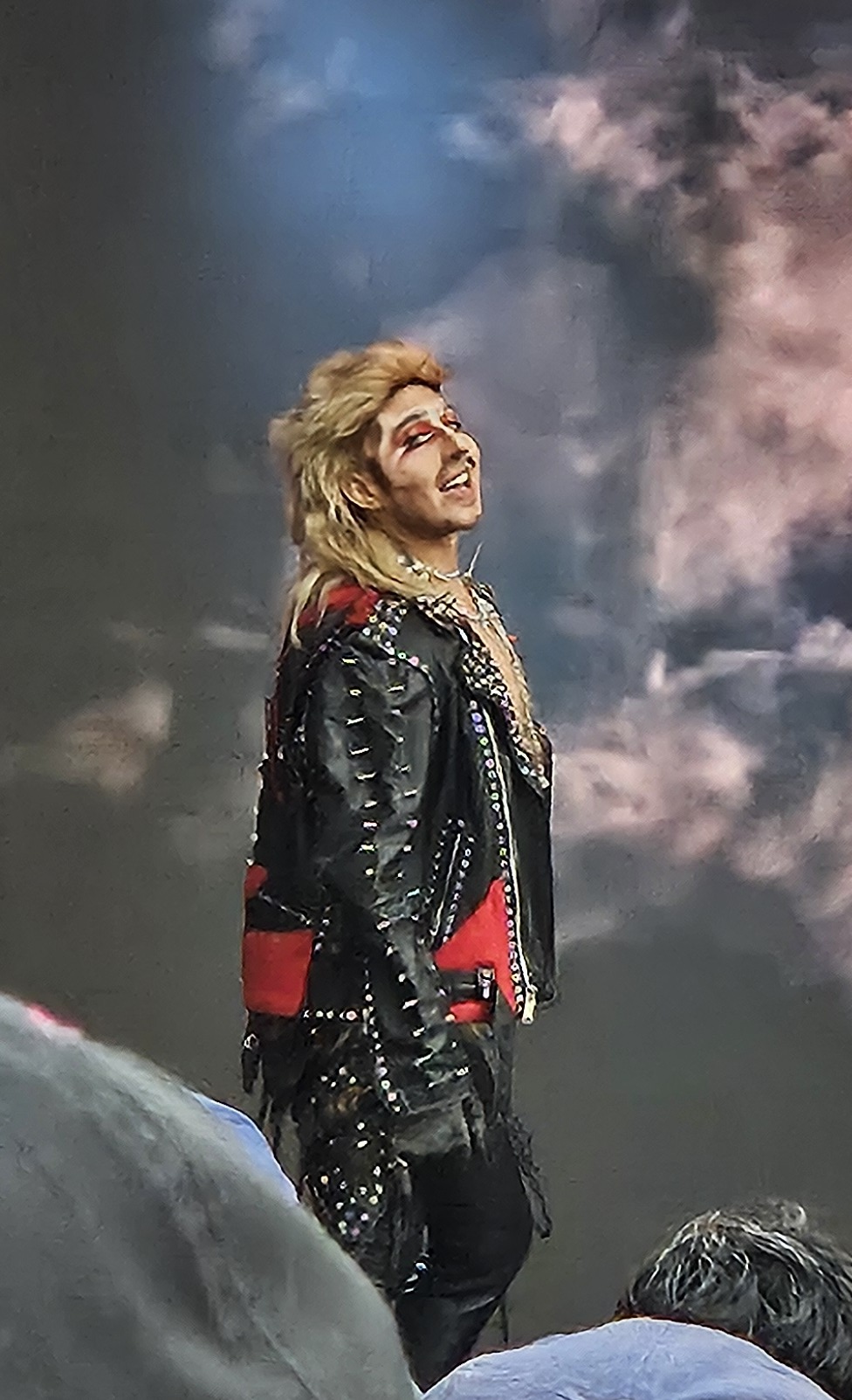
- Laguë-Barrette as Johnny Jones at Capital Pride 2026 in Ottawa
- Born: Ariane Laguë-Barrette; 1985 or 1986 (age 39–40)
- Other name: Johnny Jones
- Occupation: Drag performer
- Known for: Canada's Drag Race (season 6)

Ariane Laguë-Barrette is a Canadian drag performer known for her two drag personas: drag queen Velma Jones and drag king Johnny Jones. She competed on the sixth season of Canada's Drag Race.

== Career ==
Velma Jones, also known as Johnny Jones, is the first AFAB queen to compete on Canada's Drag Race, as well as the first drag king to compete on any Drag Race franchise. In 2022, she was the subject of an episode of Tenir salon, and co-starred in the docuseries L'agence in 2023. Jones has won the competitions "Drag Moi" at Cabaret Mado and "Mx. Cocktail" at Le Bar Cocktail, and is the co-producer and director of fellow Drag Race alum Gisèle Lullaby's weekly show "Full Gisèle".

== Personal life ==
Laguë-Barrette is based in Montreal. She uses the pronouns she/they out of drag. Velma Jones uses the pronouns she/her and Johnny Jones uses the pronouns he/him.

== Filmography ==
=== Television ===
Year	Title	Role	Notes	Ref.
2022	Tenir salon	Herself (out of drag)		
2023	L'agence	Velma/Johnny Jones		
2025	On va se le dire	Velma Jones (guest)		
2025	Canada's Drag Race	Velma/Johnny Jones (contestant)	Season 6	

== See also ==
- List of drag kings
- List of drag queens
- List of people from Montreal
