= Sami Landri =

Canadian drag performer and social media personality

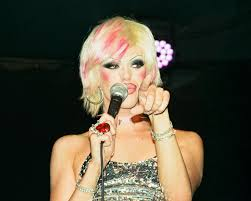
- Sami Landri (2026)
- Born: Samuel Landry; July 24, 1998 (age 28); Dieppe, New Brunswick, Canada
- Other name: Mona Noose
- Occupations: Drag artist; social media personality

Samuel Landry, (born July 24, 1998) also known by his (Note: Landry uses he/him pronouns out of drag and she/her pronouns in drag.) stage name Sami Landri, is a Canadian drag artist and social media personality of Acadian descent. He initially gained fame after a 2021 video of him as Sami Landri asking "As-tu une cigarette?" went viral. Sami, along with Barbada de Barbades, co-hosted a documentary series Drag! d'la tête aux pieds (2025) on TFO. She placed joint third on the sixth season of Canada's Drag Race, as well as winning the Shark fan favourite award, and later returned to compete on the premiere season of Canada's Drag Race All Stars.

== Early life and career ==
Samuel Landry was born on July 24, 1998 and grew up in Dieppe, New Brunswick in an Acadian family. He began his performance career at the Capitol Theatre in Moncton and studied history and theatre at the Université de Moncton for three years before dropping out to become a full-time artist. His artistic interests are diverse, ranging from dance and visual arts to music and performance. Landry began performing in 2018.

Landry co-founded the Acadian drag collective Haus of Ménage in the spring of 2019 alongside Tommy Des Rosiers (Rose Beef), Nick Després, and Xénia Gould. The collective aimed to fill a cultural gap by producing drag shows in French and Chiac, representing Acadian queer identity on stage. In 2020, under his former stage name Mona Noose, he won the title of Acadian Queen at the First Ever Acadian Drag Ball, organized by the collective. Haus of Ménage has toured across villages in New Brunswick, often presenting the first drag performances ever held in those communities.

Landry has collaborated with Xénia Gould on several artistic projects over the years. In 2020, the two held an artist residency at the Galerie Louise-et-Reuben-Cohen in Moncton, focusing on performance art and exploring the queer and Acadian identities that shape his work. In 2021, Gould directed the short film Mona, starring Landry, which won the La Vague Award for Best Acadian Short Film at the Festival international du cinéma francophone en Acadie (FICFA). That same year, Landry relocated to Montreal to pursue new creative projects.

The drag persona Sami Landri went viral on social media, propelling Landry to broader recognition. Some of Sami’s videos have garnered millions of views and attracted hundreds of thousands of followers on TikTok. The character has been described as “a trashy alter ego straight out of the 2000s — low-rise jeans, crop top, large bust, and lips lined in dark pencil,” known for his “spicy humour.”

On March 16, 2023, Sami Landri appeared on the TV show Infoman. Landry continues to perform in drag shows across Montreal, as well as elsewhere in Quebec, in Acadia, Ontario, and Europe.

Landry has also expressed an interest in creating music in Chiac. Sami's debut single, "Mon sac Tbk", was released in fall 2022. The lighthearted song humorously celebrates a drag queen’s essential accessory—the handbag—while addressing themes of homophobia.

Landry later signed with the production agency LOL LOL LOL.

In 2024, Sami Landri and Chiquita Mére (played by Xénia Gould) created a web series titled Helpez-moi, which continued into 2025. Sami also began touring with a live show called Sami Party, featuring performances by Xénia Gould.

In July 2025, Landri appeared as a guest on the television special One Night Out with Alan Cumming, which was filmed during the Just for Laughs Festival in Montreal. The special premiered on February 26, 2026 on the CTV Comedy Channel and Crave. In September that same year, she was a co-host of Drag! d’la tête aux pieds on TFO alongside drag queen Barbada de Barbades. On October 23, Landri was revealed as a contestant on the sixth season of Canada's Drag Race. The same month she was a featured artist in "Futur", a song on Robert Robert's album Boost.

On June 11, 2026, it was revealed that Landri will compete in the premiere season of Canada's Drag Race All Stars. She placed 3rd on the show.

In October 2026, Landri served on the jury for the Queer Louve award at the 2026 Festival du nouveau cinéma, alongside filmmaker Eli Jean Tahchi and writer Gabrielle Boulianne-Tremblay.

== Personal life ==
Landry is queer. In 2023, he and his artistic collaborator, Xénia Gould, broke up, but they remain best friends. Landri is currently in a relationship.

== Discography ==
=== Singles ===
- 2022: "Mon sac Tbk" (with Chris Cool)
- 2025: "Futur" (Robert Robert feat. Sami Landri)
- 2025: "Not Sorry Aboot It (Lemon’s Version)" (as part of the cast of Canada’s Drag Race)
- 2026: "As-tu des cigarettes"

== Filmography ==
=== Music videos ===
Year	Title	Director	Ref.
2023	"Mon sac Tbk" (with Chris Cool)	Chris Cool	
2025	"Futur" (Robert Robert feat. Sami Landri)	Gerardo Alcaine	

=== Short films ===
Year	Title	Role	Director	Notes	Ref.
2018	Clay		Xénia Gould		
2019	Posy		Xénia Gould		
2021	Mona	Mona	Xénia Gould	Won Best Acadian Short Film at FICFA	

=== Television ===
Year	Title	Role	Notes	Ref.
2023	Infoman	Sami Landri (guest)		
2025	Drag! d'la tête aux pieds	Sami Landri (host)	Co-hosted with Barbada de Barbades	
2025	On va se le dire	Sami Landri (guest)		
2025—2026	Canada's Drag Race	Sami Landri (contestant)	Season 6	
2026	One Night Out with Alan Cumming	Sami Landri (guest)		
2026	Tout le monde en parle	Sami Landri (guest)	Season 22 - Episode 23	
2026	Canada's Drag Race All Stars	Sami Landri (contestant)	Season 1	

=== Radio ===
Year	Title	Role	Ref.
2026	Q	Sami Landri (guest)	

=== Web series ===
Year	Title	Role	Notes	Ref.
2024—2025	Helpez-moi	Sami Landri (host)	Co-hosted with Chiquita Mére (played by Xénia Gould)	
2025	Tracy and Martina: Shootin' the Shit	Sami Landri (guest)		
