= Canada's Drag Race season 6 =

2025–2026 season of Canada's Drag Race

Canada's Drag Race
- Season 6
- Promotional poster for season six
- Hosted by: Brooke Lynn Hytes
- Judges: Brooke Lynn Hytes; Traci Melchor; Carson Kressley; Hollywood Jade; Sarain Fox
- No. of contestants: 12
- Winner: Van Goth
- Runner-up: Eboni La'Belle
- Miss Congeniality: Hazel
- No. of episodes: 9

Release
- Original network: Crave (Canada); WOW Presents Plus (International)
- Original release: November 20, 2025 – January 15, 2026

Season chronology
- ← Previous; Season 5 Next → Season 7

The sixth season of the Canadian television series Canada's Drag Race premiered on November 20, 2025 on Crave in Canada and on WOW Presents Plus internationally.

== Production ==
Casting started in October 2024, with a deadline of November 18.

== Contestants ==
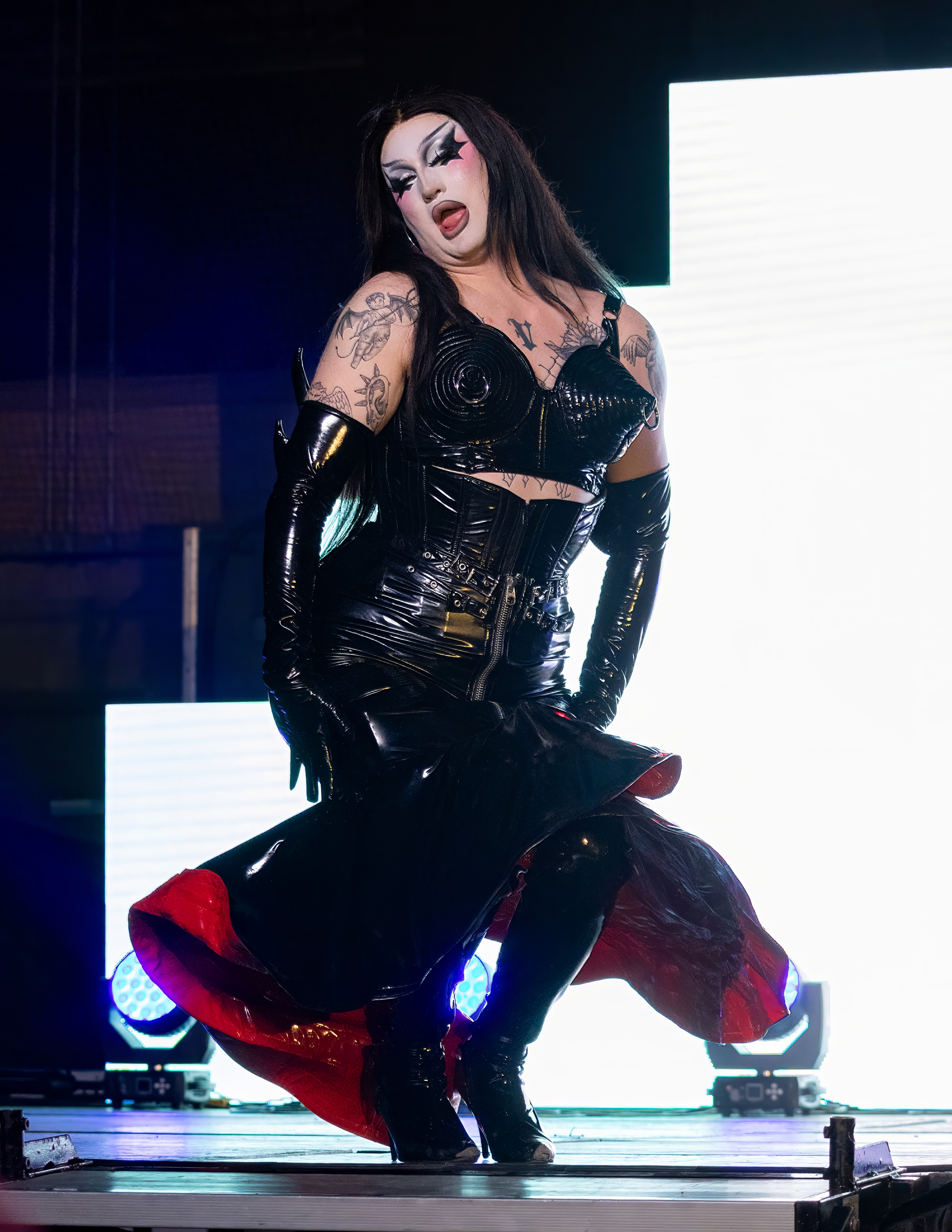
The winner, Van Goth.

Canada's Drag Race season 6 contestants and their backgrounds (Note: All ages, names, with hometowns, and outcome are stated at time of filming.)
Contestant	Age	Hometown	Outcome
Van Goth	27	Toronto, Ontario	Winner
Eboni La'Belle	23	St. Catharines, Ontario	Runner-up
PM	31	Vancouver, British Colombia	3rd place (Note: Sami Landri was voted Fan Favourite by the viewers after the show aired.)
Sami Landri	26	Moncton, New Brunswick	3rd place
Karamilk	25	Toronto, Ontario	5th place
Saltina Shaker	29	Ottawa, Ontario	6th place
Mya Foxx	31	Halifax, Nova Scotia	7th place
Velma Jones	39	Montreal, Quebec	7th place
Dulce	24	London, Ontario	9th place
Hazel	27	Vancouver, British Columbia	10th place (Note: Hazel was voted Miss Congeniality by fellow contestants.)
Star Doll	25	Toronto, Ontario	11th place
Paolo Perfección	25	Montreal, Quebec	12th place

Footnotes

== Contestant progress ==
Legend:

Van Goth won Canada's Drag Race season 6.
Eboni La'Belle was the runner-up.
Hazel was voted Miss Congeniality (Miss C) by fellow contestants.
WIN indicates that the contestant won the challenge.
WIN indicates that the contestant won one of the three rounds of the CUNTest and advanced to the finale.
Sami Landri was voted Fan Favourite (FF) by the viewers after the show aired.
TOP2 indicates that the contestant was one of the two best performing in the challenge, but lost the lip sync to win it.
SAFE indicates that the contestant was declared safe by the judges.
BVR (Golden Beaver) indicates that the contestant received the Golden Beaver and was saved from the bottom two.
BTM (Bottom) indicates that the contestant was up for elimination.
ELIM (Eliminated) indicates that the contestant was eliminated.
Guest indicates that the contestant returned as a guest.

Contestants progress with placements in each episode
Contestant	Episode									
Contestant	1	2	3	4	5	6	7	8	9	
Van Goth	WIN	SAFE	WIN	SAFE	SAFE	BVR	WIN	WIN	Winner	
Eboni La'Belle	SAFE	SAFE	SAFE	WIN	SAFE	WIN	SAFE	WIN	Runner-up	
PM	SAFE	SAFE	BVR	BTM	SAFE	BTM	BTM	WIN	Eliminated	
Sami Landri	SAFE	BTM	SAFE	SAFE	WIN	SAFE	SAFE	BTM	ELIM	FF
Karamilk	SAFE	SAFE	BTM	SAFE	BTM	SAFE	SAFE	ELIM	Guest	
Saltina Shaker	SAFE	WIN	SAFE	SAFE	BVR	TOP2	ELIM		Guest	
Mya Foxx	SAFE	SAFE	WIN	SAFE	SAFE	ELIM			Guest	
Velma Jones	SAFE	SAFE	BVR	SAFE	SAFE	ELIM			Guest	
Dulce	SAFE	SAFE	SAFE	BVR	ELIM				Guest	
Hazel	SAFE	BVR	SAFE	ELIM					Miss C	
Star Doll	SAFE	SAFE	ELIM						Guest	
Paolo Perfección	SAFE	ELIM							Guest	

== Lip syncs ==
Legend:

The contestant won the lip sync to win the challenge.
The contestant was eliminated after their first time in the bottom.
The contestant was eliminated after their third time in the bottom.
The contestant won the first round of the Lip Sync Slay Off and advanced to the next round.
The contestant won the second round of the Lip Sync Slay Off and advanced to the final round.
The contestant won the Lip Sync for the Crown and was declared the winner of the season.

Episode	Challenge Winner	vs.	Host	Song	
1	Van Goth	vs.	Brooke Lynn Hytes	"Cold Hearted" (Paula Abdul)	
Episode	Bottom contestants			Song	Eliminated
2	Paolo Perfección	vs.	Sami Landri	"Raise a Little Hell" (Trooper)	Paolo Perfección
3	Karamilk	vs.	Star Doll	"Tonight I'm Getting Over You" (Carly Rae Jepsen)	Star Doll
4	Hazel	vs.	PM	"Dumb Blonde" (Avril Lavigne ft. Nicki Minaj)	Hazel
5	Dulce	vs.	Karamilk	"Dancing and Crying" (Kiesza)	Dulce
Episode	Contestants			Song	Winner
6	Mya Foxx	vs.	Saltina Shaker	"Shut Up and Kiss Me" (Fefe Dobson)	Saltina Shaker
6	PM	vs.	Sami Landri	"I'm Alive (Live at The Colosseum)" (Céline Dion)	Sami Landri
6	Eboni La'Belle	vs.	Van Goth	"Feel Good" (Charlotte Cardin)	Eboni La'Belle
6	Karamilk	vs.	Velma Jones	"It's OK I'm OK" (Tate McRae)	Karamilk
6	Saltina Shaker	vs.	Sami Landri	"Don't Cha" (The Pussycat Dolls ft. Busta Rhymes)	Saltina Shaker
6	Eboni La'Belle	vs.	Karamilk	"Work (Freemasons Radio Edit)" (Kelly Rowland)	Eboni La'Belle
6	Eboni La'Belle	vs.	Saltina Shaker	"U + Ur Hand" (Pink)	Eboni La'Belle
6	Bottom contestants			Song	Eliminated
6	Mya Foxx vs. PM vs. Velma Jones			"Sweet Surrender" (Sarah McLachlan)	Mya Foxx
6	Mya Foxx vs. PM vs. Velma Jones			"Sweet Surrender" (Sarah McLachlan)	Velma Jones
7	PM	vs.	Saltina Shaker	"I'm a Star" (Priyanka)	Saltina Shaker
8	Karamilk	vs.	Sami Landri	"Fix You" (Vita Chambers)	Karamilk
Episode	Final contestants			Song	Winner
9	Eboni La'Belle	vs.	Van Goth	"Super Graphic Ultra Modern Girl" (Chappell Roan)	Van Goth

== Golden Beaver ==
Legend:

The contestant won the Maxi Challenge and possessed the Golden Beaver to save one of the bottom queens.
The contestant received the power of the Golden Beaver and was saved from the bottom.

Episode	Beaver Gifter	Bottom Queens	Saved
2	Saltina Shaker	Hazel, Paolo Perfección and Sami Landri	Hazel
3	Mya Foxx	Karamilk and Velma Jones	Velma Jones
3	Van Goth	PM and Star Doll	PM
4	Eboni La'Belle	Dulce, Hazel and PM	Dulce
5	Sami Landri	Dulce, Karamilk and Saltina Shaker	Saltina Shaker
6	Eboni La'Belle	Mya Foxx, PM, Van Goth and Velma Jones	Van Goth

== Guest judges ==
On November 6, 2025, it was announced Brooke Lynn Hytes and Traci Melchor would be returning to the judging panel with Carson Kressley, Hollywood Jade, and Sarain Fox serving as "special resident guest judges." Other guest judges were also announced:

- Paula Abdul, singer, dancer, choreographer, and television personality
- Glamzilla, beauty influencer and make-up artist
- Icesis Couture, winner of Canada's Drag Race Season 2 and contestant from Canada vs. the World Season 1
- Alyssa Edwards, winner of Global All Stars, and contestant from RuPaul's Drag Race Season 5 and All Stars 2
- Kiesza, singer
- Erdem Moralıoğlu, fashion designer and creative director
- Allison Russell, singer and songwriter
- Rufus Wainwright, singer and songwriter

=== Special guests ===
Guests who appeared in episodes, but did not judge on the main stage.

Episode 1

- Lemon, winner of Canada vs. the World Season 2, and contestant from Canada's Drag Race Season 1 and RuPaul's Drag Race: UK vs. the World Series 1

Episode 3

- Pythia, contestant from Canada's Drag Race Season 2 and Global All Stars

Episode 7

- Suki Doll, contestant and Miss Congeniality from Canada's Drag Race Season 2 and Drag Race Philippines: Slaysian Royale

Episode 9

- The Virgo Queen, winner of Canada's Drag Race Season 5
- Aleksandar Antonijevic, photographer
- John Diemer, recording engineer
- Jaylene Tyme, contestant and Miss Congeniality from Canada's Drag Race Season 5

== Episodes ==
No. overall	No. in season	Title	Original release date
48	1	"Not Sorry Aboot It"	November 20, 2025
Eleven new queens enter the workroom. For the first main challenge, the queens write and record verses and perform in a music video to "Not Sorry Aboot It (Lemon's Version)" a Remix of the Canada's Drag Race season 1 original. The judges reveal that based on the entrance looks, the performance in the music video and the runway presentation, the top five queens will be critiqued with one winner being named. In addition to a cash prize, the winner will also receive the opportunity to compete in a lip-sync against Brook Lynn Hytes. On the runway, category is More is More. Eboni La'Belle, PM, Saltina Shaker, Van Goth and Velma Jones receive positive critiques, with Van Goth winning the challenge. Van Goth and Brooke Lynn Hytes lip-sync to "Cold Hearted" by Paula Abdul with no particular winner being announced.: Guest Judge: Paula Abdul; Alternating Judge: Hollywood Jade; Main Challenge: Write, record, and perform verses to "Not Sorry Aboot It (Remix)"; Runway Theme: More is More; Challenge Winner: Van Goth; Challenge Prize: A $5,000 cash tip courtesy of Cedars Campground and a lip sync against Brooke Lynn Hytes; Lip-Sync Song: "Cold Hearted" by Paula Abdul; Eliminated: None
49	2	"Yachty Girls"	November 27, 2025
At the beginning of the episode it is revealed that the twist from the previous two seasons is back: the winner of the main challenge receives the power of the Golden Beaver, granting them the ability to save one of the bottom three queens from lip syncing for their life. For this week's main challenge the queens split up into three teams to write and film cruise ship commercials. The three teams are: Singles at Sea: Eboni La'Belle, Hazel, Paolo Perfección and PM; Self-Care Sisters: Saltina Shaker, Sami Landri, Van Goth and Velma Jones; Golden Gays: Dulce, Karamilk, Mya Foxx and Star Doll; On the runway, category is In the Shadows. Dulce, Saltina Shaker and Velma Jones receive positive critiques, with Saltina Shaker winning the challenge. Hazel, Paolo Perfección and Sami Landri receive negative critiques. As the winner, Saltina Shaker uses the Golden Beaver to save Hazel from the bottom two. Paolo Perfección and Sami Landri lip-sync to "Raise a Little Hell" by Trooper. Sami Landri wins the lip-sync and Paolo Perfección is the first queen to sashay away.: Guest Judge: Glamzilla; Alternating Judge: Carson Kressley; Main Challenge: In teams, film a commercial for a cruise line; Runway Theme: In the Shadows; Challenge Winner: Saltina Shaker; Challenge Prize: A $5,000 cash tip courtesy of Travel Manitoba; Bottom Two: Paolo Perfección and Sami Landri; Lip-Sync Song: "Raise a Little Hell" by Trooper; Eliminated: Paolo Perfección; Farewell Message: "2222 Booking 4 Anything: Clown, Weddings, Lots of Money, Gemtelmens (spelling?), Money 💋 3333 Love you sisters for making me feel good. See you soon? 4444 Yikes"
50	3	"Pick Your Poison"	December 4, 2025
For this week's main challenge the queens have the opportunity to pick their own adventure, by picking between two main challenges to compete in. The challenges to choose from are: The Snatch Game or a Red Carpet Afterparty Design Challenge. The five queens designing a look for the "Snatch Game Afterparty" are: Dulce, Hazel, PM, Star Doll and Van Goth. The Snatch Game cast selected by six of the Queens consisted of: Eboni La'Belle as Keke Palmer; Karamilk as Flavor Flav; Mya Foxx as Theresa Caputo; Saltina Shaker as Albert Einstein; Sami Landri as Marjorie Taylor Greene; Velma Jones as Justin Trudeau; On the runway the category for the design challenge queens is Scene Stealers. Mya Foxx and Van Goth receive positive critiques with Mya Foxx winning the Snatch Game and Van Goth winning the design challenge. Karamilk, PM, Star Doll and Velma Jones receive negative critiques. As the winners, Mya Foxx chooses to save Velma Jones and Van Goth chooses to save PM from the bottom two, by using a Golden Beaver each. Karamilk and Star Doll lip-sync to "Tonight I'm Getting Over You" by Carly Rae Jepsen. Karamilk wins the lip-sync and Star Doll sashays away.: Guest Judge: Icesis Couture; Alternating Judge: Carson Kressley; Main Challenges: Choose to compete on Snatch Game or create an outfit made for a Red Carpet; Runway Theme: Scene Stealers (Design challenge only); Challenge Winners: Mya Foxx and Van Goth; Challenge Prize: A $2,500 cash tip courtesy of Travel Manitoba; Bottom Two: Karamilk and Star Doll; Lip-Sync Song: "Tonight I'm Getting Over You" by Carly Rae Jepsen; Eliminated: Star Doll; Farewell Message: "I'm so heartbroken right now... I don't deserve to be here... but I look SOOO pu$$y right now. Just know I will always be a ★ SUPERSTAR! The STAR of Season 6 ♡ I love y'all ♡ P.S. Van you owe me $ sis."
51	4	"Reading Battles are Back Back Back Again"	December 11, 2025
Guest Judge: Alyssa Edwards; Alternating Judge: Carson Kressley; Mini Challenge: Improv a fashion consultation with Carson Kressley; Mini Challenge Winner: Sami Landri; Mini Challenge Prize: A $2,500 cash tip courtesy of Swish Embassy; Main Challenge: Reading Battles; Runway Theme: My Chemical Reaction; Challenge Winner: Eboni La'Belle; Challenge Prize: A $5,000 cash tip courtesy of Travel Manitoba; Bottom Two: Hazel and PM; Lip-Sync Song: "Dumb Blonde" by Avril Lavigne ft. Nicki Minaj; Eliminated: Hazel; Farewell Message: "Well Fuck :( PM you are the Only Bitch to put up one great fight. Honoured to battle against you, Bring it home to Vancouver! Dulce you're lucky Bitch! ♡ Season 6 sisters for life! 💋 BOOK ME!"
52	5	"The Shade"	December 18, 2025
Guest Judge: Kiesza; Alternating Judge: Carson Kressley; Mini Challenge: Sing karaoke to iconic verses from Canada's Drag Race's girl groups; Mini Challenge Winner: Dulce; Mini Challenge Prize: A $2,500 cash tip courtesy of Shoe Freaks; Main Challenge: In teams, host segments in the new daytime show The Shade; Runway Theme: A Perp Walk to Remember; Challenge Winner: Sami Landri; Challenge Prize: A $5,000 cash tip courtesy of Community One Foundation; Bottom Two: Dulce and Karamilk; Lip-Sync Song: "Dancing and Crying" by Kiesza; Eliminated: Dulce; Farewell Message: "It was an honor to show the world the star I am. See y'all later! Off to new begings ♡"
53	6	"Slayoffs"	December 25, 2025
Alternating Judge: Sarain Fox; Main Challenge: Participate in a lip-sync slay off extravaganza; Challenge Winner: Eboni La'Belle; Challenge Prize: A $5,000 cash tip courtesy of The Men's Room and The Drink; Bottom Three: Mya Foxx, PM and Velma Jones; Lip-Sync Song: "Sweet Surrender" by Sarah McLachlan; Eliminated: Mya Foxx and Velma Jones; Mya Foxx's Farewell Message: "What the Foxx!? Love you all. Here's to the most iconic season of CDR. I'm sad to go but... It just is what it is. SUCKAHS! ♡ Mya"; Velma Jones's Farewell Message: "Goodbye gorgeous sisters! What amazing cast we are stay true to yourself, love each other and don't fight too much. Sami and PM make the queerdos proud ♡ Thank you for all your love Saltina ♡ Velma xoxo + Je vous aime ♡♡♡"
54	7	"Paris (Ontario) Fashion Week"	January 1, 2026
Guest Judge: Erdem Moralıoğlu; Alternating Judge: Sarain Fox; Mini Challenge: Star in a perfume commercial; Mini Challenge Winner: PM; Mini Challenge Prize: A $2,500 cash courtesy of Safer Six; Main Challenge: Designing an outfit to be modeled by Brooke Lynn Heights; Runway Themes: Paris: Spring, Summer and Closing the Show; Challenge Winner: Van Goth; Challenge Prize: A luxury trip for two to Punta Cana courtesy of Air Canada Vacations; Bottom Two: PM and Saltina Shaker; Lip-Sync Song: "I'm a Star" by Priyanka; Eliminated: Saltina Shaker; Farewell Message: "So THAT'S how to Saltine crumbles... Thank you all for teaching me I didn't need to realize I'm worth it. Win it, girls, you know whit you are ♡ ps. hun on your lashes, Kara."
55	8	"Charisma, Uniqueness, Nerve, And Talent"	January 8, 2026
For this week's main challenge, the queens compete in the Charisma, Uniqueness, Nerve and Talent Contest (CUNTest), to secure their spot in the Grand Finale through three different challenges and a lip-sync for your life. For the first challenge (the charisma round) each queen has to perform a rap about one of the past five seasons of Canada's Drag Race. The rap performances are: Season 1: Eboni La'Belle; Season 2: Sami Landri; Season 3: Karamilk; Season 4: PM; Season 5: Van Goth; After the performances, PM is announced as the winner of the challenge. For the second challenge the remaining queens have to design and transform a little black dress to match their personal style. On the runway, category is Uniqueness. Van Goth is announced as the winner of the challenge. For the third challenge (the nerve round) the remaining queens have to perform a dramatic monologue on the runway, with all given the same speech. Eboni La'Belle is announced as the winner of the challenge. As the last two queens remaining, Karamilk and Sami Landri are announced as the bottom two queens of the week. They lip-sync to "Fix You" by Vita Chambers. Sami Landri wins the lip-sync and thus secures the last spot in the finale, with Karamilk sashaying away.: Guest Judge: Allison Russell; Alternating Judge: Sarain Fox; Main Challenge #1: Perform a rap about the previous seasons of Canada's Drag Race; Challenge #1 Winner: PM; Main Challenge #2: Design your own look with a little black dress; Challenge #2 Winner: Van Goth; Main Challenge #3: Perform a dramatic monologue; Challenge #3 Winner: Eboni La'Belle; Main Challenge #4: Lip-Sync for the Finale; Lip-Sync Song: "Fix You" by Vita Chambers; Challenge #4 Winner: Sami Landri; Challenge Prize: A $2,500 cash courtesy of The Well Restaurant and Bar; Eliminated: Karamilk; Farewell Message: "My Cunt top 4! I'm so proud of each of you ♡ Even though i didn't win, I feel like I won each week with you by mi side ♡ Love you & Stay sweet! Karamilk 💋"
56	9	"Pop Queens of the North"	January 15, 2026
Guest Judge: Rufus Wainwright; Alternating Judge: Hollywood Jade; Main Challenge: Write and record, and perform your own debut single and do a photoshoot with The Virgo Queen; Runway Theme: Coronation Eleganza; Miss Congeniality: Hazel; Eliminated: PM and Sami Landri; Lip Sync Song: "Super Graphic Ultra Modern Girl" by Chappell Roan; Runner-up: Eboni La'Belle; Winner of Canada's Drag Race Season Six: Van Goth
