= Legendary season 2 =

Second season of 'Legendary'

Legendary
- Season 2
- No. of episodes: 10

Release
- Original network: HBO Max
- Original release: May 6 – June 10, 2021

Season chronology
- ← Previous; Season 1 Next → Season 3

The second season of Legendary aired in 2021. Scoring format was introduced this season, where each judge on the panel and the guest judge scored the houses' out of 10, similar to the ball culture. This season was the only not to feature a live audience as a result of COVID-19 restrictions.

== Contestants ==
House	Contestant	Outcome
House of Miyake-Mugler	Father Arturo Mugler	Winner
House of Miyake-Mugler	Diego Mugler	Winner
House of Miyake-Mugler	Malik Mugler	Winner
House of Miyake-Mugler	Prince Mugler	Winner
House of Miyake-Mugler	Tati Mugler	Winner
House of Balenciaga	Overall Mother Shannon Balenciaga	Runner-Up
House of Balenciaga	Cha Cha Balenciaga	Runner-Up
House of Balenciaga	Honey Balenciaga (Note: Appeared as a Super Villain Challenger in Season 1, Episode 7 for Capes & Tights Ball.)	Runner-Up
House of Balenciaga	Jupiter Balenciaga	Runner-Up
House of Balenciaga	Kalik Balenciaga	Runner-Up
House of Comme des Garçon	Mother Stasha Garçon	3rd
House of Comme des Garçon	Egypt Garçon	3rd
House of Comme des Garçon	Milan Garçon	3rd
House of Comme des Garçon	Savion Garçon	3rd
House of Comme des Garçon	Tonka Garçon	3rd
House of Oricci	Father Omari Oricci	4th
House of Oricci	Alora Oricci	4th
House of Oricci	Gillette Oricci	4th
House of Oricci	Karma Oricci	4th
House of Oricci	Remi Oricci	4th
House of Tisci	Mother Gia Tisci	5th
House of Tisci	Dro Tisci	5th
House of Tisci	Simone Tisci	5th
House of Tisci	Stanley Tisci	5th
House of Tisci	Tray Tisci	5th
House of Icon	Father Jamil Icon	6th
House of Icon	Flex Icon	6th
House of Icon	Kylie Kat Icon	6th
House of Icon	Sakori Icon	6th
House of Icon	Ziggy Icon	6th
House of Milan	Mother Jocelyn Milan	7th
House of Milan	King Aus Milan	7th
House of Milan	Maleek Milan	7th
House of Milan	Marlene Milan	7th
House of Milan	Tysaun Milan	7th
House of Luxe	Father Nemo Luxe	8th
House of Luxe	Akasha Luxe	8th
House of Luxe	Becky Luxe	8th
House of Luxe	Dizzy Luxe	8th
House of Luxe	Jah Luxe (Note: Jah couldn't continue to be on the show, due to a severe hand injury.)	8th
House of Prodigy	Mother Jacen Prodigy	9th/10th
House of Prodigy	Dejiavu Prodigy	9th/10th
House of Prodigy	Gee Prodigy	9th/10th
House of Prodigy	Hank Prodigy	9th/10th
House of Prodigy	Kam Kam Prodigy	9th/10th
House of Chanel	Father Drama Chanel	9th/10th
House of Chanel	Alanah Chanel	9th/10th
House of Chanel	Angel Chanel	9th/10th
House of Chanel	Cookie Chanel	9th/10th
House of Chanel	Mari Chanel	9th/10th

== House progress ==
House	1	2	3	4	5	6	7	8	9	10
House of Miyake-Mugler	HIGH		SAFE	LOW	BTM2	HIGH	WIN	WIN	WIN	Winner
House of Balenciaga	HIGH		HIGH	WIN	WIN	HIGH	HIGH	HIGH	BTM2	Runner-Up
House of Comme des Garçons		HIGH	HIGH	HIGH	SAFE	LOW	HIGH	BTM2	ELIM	
House of Oricci	SAFE		SAFE	HIGH	HIGH	LOW	BTM2	ELIM		
House of Tisci		HIGH	WIN	SAFE	HIGH	WIN	ELIM			
House of Icon		BTM2	LOW	BTM2	ELIM					
House of Milan		SAFE	BTM2	ELIM						
House of Luxe	BTM2		ELIM							
House of Prodigy		ELIM								
House of Chanel	ELIM									

Table Key
The house won Legendary
The house was the runner-up
The house won the ball and was declared the superior house of the episode
The house won one of the categories or received positive critiques from the judges and was declared safe
The house received critiques from the judges and was declared safe
The house received negative critiques on their performance but was declared safe
The house was in the bottom two
The house was eliminated

== House scores ==
Scores Order: Law + Jameela + Megan + Leiomy + Guest Judge (+ Challenge Win)= Total Score

House	1	2	3	4	5	6 (Note: The individual scores given by the judges were not revealed, but rather the overall score.)	7	8	9	10
House of Miyake-Mugler	8+10+10+10=38		8+9+10+9+9=45	6+8+6+9+9=38	9+10+9+9+9=46	46	10+10+10+10+10=50	10+10+10+10+10(+10)=60	9+9+10+10+9(+10+10)=67	38(+15)=53
House of Balenciaga	10+10+9+10=39		9+10+10+10+10=49	10+9+10+10+10=49	8+8+7+9+9(+10)=51	48	8+8+9+7+8(+10)=50	7+10+10+10+9(+10)=56	7+7+8+7+6(+10)=45	37(+10)=47
House of Comme Des Garçons		8+10+10+9=37	9+10+10+10+10=49	10+10+9+10+10=49 (Note: The House of Comme de Garcon tied with the House of Balenciaga but the guest judge broke the tie and declared House of Balenciaga as the Superior House of The Week.)	10+9+10+9+10=48	34	9+10+10+10+10=49	7+8+7+6+7=35	9+10+8+7+8=42	
House of Oricci	7+9+10+10=36		10+9+9+9+10=47	6+9+7+7+7(+10)=46	10+10+10+10+10=50	39	7+8+7+7+7=36	9+10+8+9+9=45		
House of Tisci		8+10+10+10=38	10+10+10+10+10=50	8+9+10+8+8=43	10+10+10+10+10=50	49	8+9+8+8+9=42			
House of Icon		5+9+8+7=29	10+9+10+7+8=44	7+6+9+5+6=33	9+10+9+9+9=46					
House of Milan		10+8+9+7=34	6+6+5+6+5=28	7+8+6+5+6=32						
House of Luxe	10+7+8+7=32		4+7+7+5+6=29							
House of Prodigy		6+10+8+7=31								
House of Chanel	4+6+6+6=22									

The house received the highest score in the episode.
The house received the lowest score and was in the bottom two.

== Vogue redemption battles ==
Episode	Bottom Two Houses			Eliminated
1	House of Chanel	vs	House of Luxe	House of Chanel
1	Angel Chanel	vs	Becky Luxe	House of Chanel
2	House of Icon	vs	House of Prodigy	House of Prodigy
2	Sakori Icon	vs	Dejiavu Prodigy	House of Prodigy
3	House of Luxe	vs	House of Milan	House of Luxe
3	Becky Luxe	vs	Maleek Milan	House of Luxe
4	House of Milan	vs	House of Icon	House of Milan
4	Marlene Milan	vs	Kylie Kat Icon	House of Milan
5	House of Icon	vs	House of Miyake-Mugler	House of Icon
5	Jamil Icon	vs	Malik Mugler	House of Icon
7	House of Tisci	vs	House of Nina Oricci	House of Tisci
7	Simone Tisci	vs	Omari Oricci	House of Tisci
8	House of Comme des Garçon	vs	House of Nina Oricci	House of Oricci
8	Egypt Garçon	vs	Omari Oricci	House of Oricci
9	House of Balenciaga	vs	House of Comme des Garçon	House of Comme des Garçon
9	Honey Balenciaga	vs	Savion Garçon	House of Comme des Garçon

== Episodes ==
No. overall	No. in season	Title	Original release date https://www.youtube.com/watch?v=DIaqBbBXjfU
10	1	"Grand March Part 1"	May 6, 2021
Challenge: Houses must make their first impression by choreographing and performing a presentation true to their house; Highest Scoring House: House of Balenciaga; Bottom Two: House of Chanel and House of Luxe; Eliminated: House of Chanel
11	2	"Grand March Part 2"	May 6, 2021
Challenge: Houses must make their first impression by choreographing and performing a presentation true to their house; Highest Scoring House: House of Tisci; Bottom Two: House of Icon and House of Prodigy; Eliminated: House of Prodigy
12	3	"Tinseltown"	May 6, 2021
The theme for the House of Comme des Garçons 1920s burlesque glamor. The theme for the House of Milan is the 1970s. Nicco Annan was a guest judge. The House of Tisci was selling big hair and theme of the 1980s; they are the first house to receive 10s from all five judges and was ultimately declared as the Superior House.: Guest Judge: Nicco Annan; Challenge: With an ode to Hollywood, the houses must present "best dressed" with one member serving face.; Highest Scoring House: House of Tisci; Superior House of the Week: House of Tisci; Bottom Two: House of Luxe and House of Milan; Eliminated: House of Luxe
13	4	"Seven Deadly Sins"	May 13, 2021
Guest Judge: Normani; Challenge: Houses must choreograph and present a performance modeled after the seven deadly sins: pride, greed, lust, envy, gluttony, wrath, and sloth.; Highest Scoring House: House of Balenciaga and House of Comme De Garçon; Second Challenge: Male Figure All-American Runway and Catwalk Showdown; Second Challenge Winner: Omari Oricci (House of Oricci); Superior House of the Week: House of Balenciaga; Bottom Two: House of Milan and House of Icon; Eliminated: House of Milan
14	5	"Pop Tart"	May 20, 2021
Guest Judge: Taraji P. Henson; Challenge: Houses must present a pop art inspired performance with elements of hip hop.; Highest Scoring House: House of Tisci and House of Oricci; Second Challenge: Body and Runway Showdown; Second Challenge Winner: Shannon Balenciaga (House of Balenciaga); Superior House of the Week: House of Balenciaga; Bottom Two: House of Icon and House of Miyake-Mugler; Eliminated: House of Icon
15	6	""Plastic Fantastic""	May 27, 2021
Guest Judge: Amiyah Scott; Challenge: The houses must present a performance that brings plastic toys to life.; Highest Scoring House: House of Tisci; Second Challenge: Runway as a duo or trio, then one individual from each house proceeds to a runway showdown; Second Challenge Winner: Cha Cha Balenciaga (House of Balenciaga); Third Challenge: Duckwalk as a duo or trio, then one individual from each house will proceed in a duckwalk showdown.; Third Challenge Winner: Simone Tisci (House of Tisci); Superior House of the Week: House of Tisci; Bottom Two: None; Eliminated: None
16	7	"OVAH! Ball"	June 3, 2021
Guest Judge: Adam Lambert; Challenge: Perform together as a house incorporating one designated element of vogue.; Highest Scoring House: House of Miyake-Mugler; Second Challenge: Hand Performance Showdown; Second Challenge Winner: Kalik Balenciaga (House of Balenciaga); Superior House of the Week: House of Miyake-Mugler; Bottom Two: House of Tisci and House of Oricci; Eliminated: House of Tisci
17	8	"Ice Haus"	June 3, 2021
Guest Judge: Demi Lovato; Challenge: Perform as a house featuring poses and dips.; Highest Scoring House: House of Miyake-Mugler; Second Challenge: Three Fab Mice; Second Challenge Winner: Malik, Prince, and Father Arturo Miyake-Mugler (House of Miyake-Mugler); Third Challenge: Team Face; Third Challenge Winner: Kalik & Cha Cha Balenciaga (House of Balenciaga); Superior House of the Week: House of Miyake-Mugler; Bottom Two: House of Comme des Garçon and House of Oricci; Eliminated: House of Oricci
18	9	"Elektric Jungle"	June 10, 2021
Guest Judge: Tiffany Haddish; Challenge: Perform as a house featuring one of three elements of vogue – hair whips, spins and dips, and floor performance – with a bizarre twist.; Highest Scoring House: House of Miyake-Mugler; Second Challenge: Tag Team Virgin Vogue; Second Challenge Winner: Malik & Prince Miyake-Mugler (House of Miyake-Mugler); Third Challenge: Arms Control; Third Challenge Winner: Cha Cha Balenciaga (House of Balenciaga); Fourth Challenge: Shake That Sexy Duo (Sex Siren); Fourth Challenge Winner: Tati and Diego Miyake-Mugler (House of Miyake-Mugler); Superior House of the Week: House of Miyake-Mugler; Bottom Two: House of Comme des Garçon and House of Balenciaga; Eliminated: House of Comme des Garçon
19	10	"Ballroom 5000"	June 10, 2021
Hand Performance: Kalik Balenciaga vs Arturo Mugler; Hand Performance Winner: Kalik Balenciaga (House of Balenciaga); Duckwalk: Shannon Balenciaga vs Malik Mugler; Duckwalk Winner: Malik Mugler (House of Miyake-Mugler); Catwalk: Jupiter Balenciaga vs Diego Mugler; Catwalk Winner: Diego Mugler (House of Miyake-Mugler); Floor Performance: Honey Balenciaga vs Prince Mugler; Floor Performance Winner: Honey Balenciaga (House of Balenciaga); Spins and Dips: Cha Cha Balenciaga vs Tati Mugler; Spins and Dips Winner: Tati Mugler (House of Miyake-Mugler); Runner-up: House of Balenciaga; Winner of Legendary Season Two: House of Miyake-Mugler
