= Paula Griffin (footballer) =

British football goalkeeper (born 1964 or 1965)

Paula Griffin (born 1964 or 1965) is a goalkeeper from Bermondsey, south-east London, England. She has played for Goal Diggers F.C., TRUK United F.C., Peckham Town F.C.'s women's team, and Clapton Community F.C. Griffin is transgender and has been open about her gender transition, motivated by a cancer diagnosis, and her experiences as a trans footballer.

== Early life and career ==
Griffin has said that she knew her gender did not correspond to her sex since she was a child, though due to the people around her she believed she could not come out despite having a few opportunities to do so. She had a "major breakdown" when she was young, and as a result returned to her Cornwall home where her mother introduced her to a transgender friend. Griffin later returned to London. She struggled with this issue for several decades, and developed heavy drinking and chain smoking habits, becoming a "workaholic" in her recruitment job. From the 1990s, she was a volunteer in several different roles for Dulwich Hamlet F.C.. Around 2000, she stopped playing football.

=== Cancer diagnosis and transition ===
In 2017, Griffin was subject to a stage-three bladder cancer diagnosis, and as a result was immediately admitted to hospital. She has stated that this diagnosis was a "wake-up call" which motivated her to admit to herself that she was transgender and remove the aspects of her life that she believed had caused her cancer. She stopped her smoking and heavy drinking, underwent surgery, and after a recovery period of six months during which she had time for reflection, began a process of gender transition in 2019, which took around a year. She also changed jobs as a result of the diagnosis.

== Football career ==
In 2021, Griffin initially approached Goal Diggers F.C. after seeing a tweet from them. She was playing for Goal Diggers by that summer, as well as Peckham Town F.C.'s women's team by December that year. By this time, Griffin had been on a waiting list at a gender identity clinic for the past two and a half years. Her first game with Peckham was on Clapham Common, at which she was subject to transphobic comments from two teenage boys. She received a passport recognising her as female in 2022. Struggling early on, she also joined the all-transgender club TRUK United F.C. and in 2022 as part of this team she took part in the first match between an all-trans women's side and a women's team from the Football Association pyramid; the Dulwich Hamlet F.C. women's team. In August 2022 she was still playing for TRUK United, Gold Diggers, and Peckham Town Women; she was awarded Coaches' Player of the Year at the latter.

By April 2025, Griffin was goalkeeper for Clapton Community F.C., Goal Diggers, and Peckham Town Women. On 27 July 2025 at Hyde Park, Griffin was expected to run Cancer Research UK's Race for Life, sounding its starting buzzer. Responding to the Football Association's rule change prohibiting transgender women from playing in women's games, Griffin said that "I didn't transition to play women’s sports, I play women's football because I transitioned."

== Personal life ==
Paula Griffin had an older sister, Kerry, who died while Paula was in surgery. Kerry had been receiving chemotherapy for colorectal cancer. In October 2022, Griffin said that a male security guard at a McDonald's restaurant followed her to the toilet and asked her to "prove" that she was female with her passport.
