= Queer Newark Oral History Project =

Oral history project

The Queer Newark Oral History Project (QNOHP) is a community-based oral history for the LGBTQ+ community of Newark, New Jersey. LGBTQ+ Newark citizens share their diverse experiences through oral interviews, which are translated into historical archives that are accessible to the public. The purpose of this project is to highlight the individualistic experiences of many different LGBTQ+ Newark citizens, in order to make a place in history for LGBTQ+ people of color. The QNOHP oral histories describe ballroom culture, queer clubs, AIDS activism and awareness, poverty, and discrimination.

== History and background ==
The Queer Newark Oral History Project (QNOHP) was founded in 2011 by activist and writer Darnell Moore, Rutgers–Newark history professor Beryl Satter, and Rutgers–Newark administrator of the History and African-American and African Studies departments, Christina Strasburger. The QNOHP aids in research purposes, public programming, and the accessibility to oral interview recordings of Newark, New Jersey's LGBTQ+ community.

Oral interviews have been, and are being conducted to produce and display the lives of queer Newark.

The QNOHP even began a second program in 2014, called the "Sanctuary: A History of Queer Club Spaces in Newark". This program created a safe haven for queer people of color, as it incorporated art, poetry readings, and a discussion facilitated by performers, participants of ballroom houses and queer bars and clubs dating from the 1960's to today's society.

== Awards ==
For their notable work of advocacy for queer Newark's oral history, in 2016 the Queer Newark Oral History Project was awarded the Rutgers University Clement A. Price Human Dignity Award. The Queer Newark Oral History Project was presented with this award for their diligence with making the QNOHP into a community-based project, involving Newark, New Jersey's residents and the faculty, staff, and students of Rutgers University–Newark. The oral histories, advocacy, the preserving of Newark's LGBTQ+ artifacts, and the creation of the archives, all serve as a contributing factor to the QNOHP receiving this award.
