= Nina Chaubal =

- Born: 1992 (age 33–34); India
- Occupations: Software engineer, activist
- Known for: Co-founder and former Director of Operations, Trans Lifeline
- Spouse: Greta Martela (m. 2015)
- Awards: Trans Justice Funding Project Community Grantmaking Fellow (2017)

Nina Chaubal (born 1992) is the co-founder and former Director of Operations at Trans Lifeline, the first transgender suicide hotline to exist in the United States and Canada. As a leading LGBTQ+ activist and trans woman, when Chaubal was held in immigration detention, the story made national headlines in publications such as The New York Times and Chicagoist. In 2019, Chaubal was the subject of the first episode of America in Transition, a documentary about transgender people of color.

== Early life ==
Chaubal grew up in Mumbai, India. At 13 years old, she discovered the word 'transgender' and realized it described her. She found connection with other trans people through the internet.

== Education and career ==
In 2009, Chaubal immigrated alone to the United States on a student visa to attend college at the University of Illinois Champaign-Urbana. She undertook an internship at Riverbed Technology in 2011 as a quality assurance software engineer. In 2012, she interned at Google in a similar capacity. Also in 2012, she worked as a programmer at the National Center for Supercomputing Applications at the University of Illinois. In 2013, she came out as trans. As her family was not supportive of her transness, the familial relationship was fractured.

Chaubal earned her H1B, a visa for foreign workers employed in the U.S. in order to work at Google as a software engineer, a position she accepted in January 2013. In 2014, Chaubal co-founded the 501(c)(3) Trans Lifeline with Greta Martela. The organization was the first transgender suicide hotline to exist in the United States and Canada. The cause was close to the pair, as Chaubal had struggled with suicidal thoughts and Martela had been hospitalized for being suicidal.

Chaubal remained in her post as a Google engineer through April 2015. The same month, she took the post of Director of Operations at Trans Lifeline. In February 2015, Chaubal attended the National Conference on LGBT Equality, overseeing a Trans Lifeline booth there. In June of the same year, Chaubal was the subject of one of Miley Cyrus's Happy Hippie Presents #InstaPride Portraits Campaign. In the photos, Chaubal appears with her wife and Trans Lifeline co-founder Greta Martela, as well as Cyrus. On August 30, 2015, Chaubal was among the Happy Hippie Foundation representatives to speak onstage and introduce Miley Cyrus at the MTV Video Music Awards.

On Nov. 20, 2015, Chaubal and Trans Lifeline launched the Canadian branch of their operations.

On Feb. 22, 2016, Chaubal appeared on KGNU 88.5 FM to discuss the continued need for trans crisis support. In April 2016, Chaubal appeared on the panel "Suicidality Among Transgender Populations: New Directions in Understanding and Treatment" at the American Association of Suicidology Conference.

In January 2018, Trans Lifeline's Board of Directors dismissed Chaubal and Martela, after an internal audit discovered that they had misdirected over $350,000 of the organization's funds. Chaubal subsequently took a post at Hustle as a software engineer, then transitioned to work at Even.com in the same capacity.

In 2019, Chaubal was the subject of "Where Is My Refuge?", the first episode of America in Transition, a documentary about transgender people of color. Also in 2019, Chaubal began organizing an intentional living community, art space, and small business incubator in the Mojave Desert.

=== ICE detention and release ===
On Dec. 28, 2016, while driving from California to her home in Chicago through a checkpoint in Wellton, Arizona, Chaubal was stopped and detained by ICE agents, who asked for her passport. She produced a photo of it, which is when they saw that she was designated as male on it, contrasting with her gender expression in-person. They also noted that she was in the country on an expired work visa, although she was legally married to a U.S. citizen, Martela. She was then transported to a holding facility in Arizona, eventuating in her admission to Eloy Detention Center, which has a reputation for violence against LGBTQ+ detainees. She was released Jan. 2, 2017 after posting $4,500 bond, which she was able to do with the help of an online crowdfunding campaign.

=== Embezzlement ===
In January 2018, a Trans Lifeline internal review involving independent legal and financial professionals revealed that Chaubal and Martela had made $353,703 of unauthorized purchases for personal benefit and side projects. The Board of Directors immediately removed the co-founders from the organization and began seeking mediation. Chaubal and Martela were able to repay $8,585, and in June 2018, agreed to repay the remaining amount over the next ten years, in lieu of lawsuit or other recovery attempts.

== Awards and honors ==
- In 2017, Chaubal was designated a Trans Justice Funding Project Community Grantmaking Fellow.

== Personal life ==
Chaubal married Greta Martela in 2015.
