= Gia Love =

American transgender activist

- Occupations: Activist, Model, Performer, Actress
- Known for: Founder of the Celebration of Black Trans Women Cookout;
- Style: Ballroom (Kiki)
- Movement: Black Transgender rights

Gia Love is a Black transgender activist, model, kiki performer, ballroom mother and actress.

Love runs the Celebration of Black Trans Women Cookout, a yearly event held at Herbert Von King Park, New York. It was held for the first time in 2021, with around 200 attendees showing up. Love founded the event to be a celebration of black trans lives, and to celebrate the community's achievements.
