= Junior LaBeija =

American performer (born 1957)

Junior LaBeija (born 1957) is a ballroom performer and activist. He has been a member of the House of LaBeija for more than 50 years, and was the emcee for the Paris is Burning ball, featured in the 1990 documentary Paris Is Burning. In 2026, he made his Broadway debut as Gus in Cats: The Jellicle Ball.

== Early life ==
LaBeija was born in Harlem in 1957 as James Goode Jr. He was the eldest of four children, and came out to his parents as gay when he was "barely a teen." After his father left the family a few years later, his mother became a Jehovah's Witness. LaBeija has said that his door-to-door spreading of gospel during this period is where he found his gift for oratory. LaBeija was introduced to ball culture as a teenager near the Christopher Street Pier. After enduring physical abuse from his siblings, he emancipated himself at the age of 15 and was taken under the wing of ballroom queen Gigi LaBeija of the House of LaBeija.

== Career ==
=== Ballroom ===
In the ballroom scene, LaBeija gained recognition for his emcee skills. He was noted for one-liners and commentary. He is a member of the House of LaBeija and walked in the Nostalgia category in his first ball. In 1982, LaBeija began doing drag at a Manhattan gay bar, where he gained a reputation as a "whimsical, clevel butch queen".

In the 1990 documentary Paris is Burning, LaBeija was featured as the emcee. He was noted for his theatricality and wit and was described as "the voice of the film", even though he was not officially credited due to walking out of his official interview before it began. LaBeija starred as Gus in the Broadway and Off-Broadway productions of Cats: The Jellicle Ball a reimagining of Andrew Lloyd Webber's musical Cats as a New York ball.

=== Activism ===
In his late 30s, LaBeija earned a degree in social work, specializing in severe disability. In 2013, LaBeija participated in a panel event at the Leslie-Lohman Museum of Gay and Lesbian Art. He is outspoken about gentrification in the West Village and how it has harmed the black, brown queer communities who were forced out.
