= Legendary season 1 =

First season of 'Legendary'

Legendary
- Season 1
- No. of episodes: 9

Release
- Original network: HBO Max
- Original release: May 27 – July 9, 2020

Season chronology
- Next → Season 2

The first season of Legendary aired on HBO Max for 9 episodes from May 27, 2020 to July 9, 2020. The showrunners and executive producers were Jane Y. Mun and Josh Greenberg.

== Contestants ==
House	Contestant	Outcome
House of Balmain	Father Jamari Balmain (Jamari Amour)	Winner
House of Balmain	Cali Balmain	Winner
House of Balmain	Calypso Jetè Balmain	Winner
House of Balmain	Gravity Balmain	Winner
House of Balmain	Torie Balmain	Winner
House of Lanvin	Mother Eyricka Lanvin	Runner-Up
House of Lanvin	Carlos Lanvin	Runner-Up
House of Lanvin	Makayla Lanvin	Runner-Up
House of Lanvin	Pack-Rat Lanvin	Runner-Up
House of Lanvin	Zay Lanvin	Runner-Up
House of Escada	Mother London Escada	3rd
House of Escada	Jazzul Escada	3rd
House of Escada	Shyanne Escada	3rd
House of Escada	Twilight Escada	3rd
House of Escada	Yyoyo Escada	3rd
House of Gorgeous Gucci	Father Jarrell Gucci	4th
House of Gorgeous Gucci	Delicious Gucci	4th
House of Gorgeous Gucci	Deshon Gucci	4th
House of Gorgeous Gucci	Jeter Gucci	4th
House of Gorgeous Gucci	Miracle Gucci (Note: Miracle Gucci left the competition during episode three "Circus Bezerkus".)	4th
House of Ninja	Mother Dolores Ninja	5th
House of Ninja	Chise Ninja	5th
House of Ninja	Jamie Ninja	5th
House of Ninja	Lady Sattva Ninja (Michelle)	5th
House of Ninja	Sharron Ninja	5th
House of Ebony	Mother Isla Ebony (Isla Cheadle)	6th
House of Ebony	Machante Ebony	6th
House of Ebony	Shorty Ebony	6th
House of Ebony	Shy Ebony	6th
House of Ebony	Xa'Pariis Ebony	6th
House of St. Laurent	Mother Michell'e St. Laurent	7th
House of St. Laurent	Champ St. Laurent (Lashawn Dawson)	7th
House of St. Laurent	Christian St. Laurent (Christian Banks)	7th
House of St. Laurent	Mikoko St. Laurent (Corey)	7th
House of St. Laurent	Pretty St. Laurent (Devin Gabriel)	7th
House of West	Father James West	8th
House of West	Destiny West	8th
House of West	Buffy West	8th
House of West	Maurice West (Maurice)	8th
House of West	Wilma West	8th

== House progress ==
House	1	2	3	4	5	6	7	8 (Note: In episode 8, the four houses were paired up into two mega-houses competing against each other)	9
House of Balmain	SAFE	BTM2	HIGH	SAFE	HIGH	LOW	HIGH	WIN	Winner
House of Lanvin	SAFE	WIN	SAFE	WIN	BTM2	WIN	WIN	BTM2	Runner-up
House of Escada	SAFE	LOW	WIN	BTM2	LOW	BTM2	SAFE	WIN	Eliminated
House of Gorgeous Gucci	SAFE	SAFE	HIGH	BTM2	WIN	HIGH	SAFE	ELIM	
House of Ninja	WIN	HIGH	BTM2	HIGH	HIGH	ELIM			
House of Ebony	SAFE	SAFE	LOW	SAFE	ELIM				
House of St. Laurent	SAFE	HIGH	ELIM						
House of West	SAFE	ELIM							

Table Key
The house won Legendary
The house was the runner-up
The house won the ball and was declared the superior house of the episode
The house won one of the categories of the episode or received positive critiques from the judges and was declared safe
The house received critiques from the judges and was declared safe
The house received negative critiques on their performance but was declared safe
The house was in the bottom two
The house was eliminated
The house did not battle and was eliminated

== Vogue redemption battles ==
Episode	Bottom Two Houses			Eliminated
1 (Note: In Episode 1 "Welcome to My House", none of the houses were in the bottom two or eliminated from the competition.)	None			
2	House of Balmain	vs	House of West	House of West
2	Father Jamari Balmain	vs	Wilma West	House of West
3	House of Ninja	vs	House of St. Laurent	House of St. Laurent
3	Chise Ninja	vs	Pretty St. Laurent	House of St. Laurent
4 (Note: In Episode 4 "Wild Wild West", the two bottom houses were allowed to stay another week and did not participate in a vogue battle.)	House of Escada	vs	House of Gorgeous Gucci	None
4	None	vs	None	None
5	House of Ebony	vs	House of Lanvin	House of Ebony
5	Shorty Ebony	vs	Makayla Lanvin	House of Ebony
6	House of Escada	vs	House of Ninja	House of Ninja
6	Shyanne Escada	vs	Sharron Ninja	House of Ninja
7 (Note: In Episode 7 "Capes & Tights", none of the houses were in the bottom two or eliminated from the competition.)	None			
8	House of Gorgeous Gucci	vs	House of Lanvin	House of Gorgeous Gucci
8	Jeter Gucci	vs	Makayla Lanvin	House of Gorgeous Gucci
9 (Note: In Episode 9 "Heaven and Hell", no houses were in the bottom two or participated in a battle. However, the House of Escada was eliminated, and House of Balmain was announced as the winner.)	None			

== Episodes ==
No. overall	No. in season	Title	Original release date
1	1	"Welcome to My House"	May 27, 2020
MC Dashaun Wesley introduces the main panel of judges and eight houses from the world of ballroom. These houses will compete each week in ballroom-oriented challenges to earn the title of "Superior House of the Week" and win the Legendary Trophy. At the final ball, the last house standing earns legendary status and US$100,000. For their first challenge, the houses must make their house statement and show the judges who they are, which is traditionally called "The Grand March" in ballroom. During the first episode, a Superior House will be crowned, but none will be eliminated. House of Escada: Escada consists of a close-knit group of members that rely on one other like a genuine family. Escada performs a vogue-oriented showcase while wearing black, crow-feather inspired outfits. The judges give positive critiques for the outfits and overall energy of the performance, but feel there was a lack of creativity in terms of choreography. Leiomy urges Escada to improve on displaying confidence and personality in their future performances. House of Ebony: Wesley explains House of Ebony is one of the oldest and most celebrated houses in ballroom. Mother Isla Ebony, a white cis woman, leads the house's other four members. Ebony is traditionally a black-oriented house, so Isla feels pressure to protect and cultivate the legacy of Ebony due to her role as its leader. Ebony performs a vogue-oriented performance while wearing banjee-themed fashion. The judges give praise to Ebony's high energy and cohesiveness as a group, but feel the outfits were lackluster. House of Ninja: Ninja is an international voguing house created by House Father Willi Ninja in 1982. House of Ninja in Legendary is the only group to be fully composed of cis women, who dub themselves as "femme-fatales". This house is known for their precision in terms of vogue, and classy and elegant performances. Ninja performs a vogue-oriented performance while wearing ninja-inspired hair and garments. The judges give glowing critiques for Ninja's fashion, hair, and makeup choices. They feel the performance was executed perfectly and praise Ninja for the Asian-themed concept. House of Gorgeous Gucci: Gucci, a newer ballroom house, are a confident group of performers that shine in both runway and vogue. Gucci performs a vogue-oriented performance while wearing old Hollywood glamour inspired outfits. The judges give praise for the cohesive outfit choices and clear story, and enjoy the positive energy of the performance. House of West: West is a newer house created by Father James West at only 27 years old. The members are confident and see themselves as "rebels" because they want to have an ever-lasting impact on the ballroom scene. West performs a vogue-oriented performance while wearing colorful London/Vivienne Westwood inspired fashion, as proclaimed by Law Roach. The judges give positive critiques for the choreography, fashion, and unique concept, and enjoy the modernistic presentation. House of St. Laurent: St. Laurent is a "boutique house", made famous from the film Paris Is Burning, that shines in terms of face, fashion, and runway. The members are a close-knit group led Mother Michell'e St. Laurent, a trans woman who finds solace in the ballroom. St. Laurent presents a fashion and story-themed performance, including a spoken word lip-sync by Mother Michell'e. The judges give positive critiques for the presentation and creative fashion choices, but feel the performance lacked confidence and energy. Jameela asks St. Laurent to present more vogue in future performances, but Michell'e explains she presented her house the way that they are. House of Lanvin: Lanvin is a house known for shining in fashion categories. The members of Lanvin present themselves as a close family centered around Mother Eyricka, a trans woman, and each member finds a safe space to be themselves in the ballroom. Lanvin presents a vogue-oriented performance focused on Mother Eyricka, while wearing high-fashion red outfits. The judges give praise for all aspects of the performance, and enjoy the choice of red outfits. Jameela exclaims Lanvin made her experience her "first gag", and took her "gag virginity". House of Balmain: Balmain is a house known for its uniqueness and creativity, consisting of members who've experienced heartbreak and painful experiences throughout life, but find a comfortable and loving environment within their house to truly express themselves. Balmain serves a hip-hop oriented performance with acrobatics, while wearing see-through tight black garments and black boots. The judges give praise for the confidence, fashion, and high energy of Balmain's members, but did not see enough vogue and ballroom elements in the performance. After all eight houses present their first performance, the judges deliberate and declare House of Ninja as the Superior House of the Week.: Challenge: Houses must make their first impression by choreographing and performing a presentation true to their house; Superior House of the Week: House of Ninja; Bottom Two: None; Eliminated: None
2	2	"Once Upon a Time"	May 27, 2020
MC Dashaun Wesley introduces the main panel of judges and model Tyson Beckford as this episode's guest judge. Wesley then announces this week's challenge is a "Once Upon a Time" themed ball where the eight houses are required to walk in three categories: Rapunzel Effect, Mirror Mirror, and Three Fab Mice. The House with the best overall performance in this ball will earn superior house of the week while one of the bottom two houses is eliminated. Rapunzel Effect: In this category, the judges need one member from each house to walk the runway serving a hair-oriented performance. Leiomy announces that if a competitor's hair falls off they are automatically chopped. The competitors from each house are Champ St. Laurent, Chise Ninja, Jeter Gucci, Xa'Pariis Ebony, Father London Escada, Makayla Lanvin, Calypso Balmain, and Destiny West. Father London Escada, Calypso Balmain, and Destiny West are chopped, with the latter's hair falling off, and sent backstage; meanwhile the other competitors earn tens across the board and stand to the side. Champ St. Laurent and Chise Ninja battle against each other, and Ninja stays. Jeter Gucci, Xa'Pariis Ebony, and Makayla Lanvin battle against each other, and Lanvin stays. The final two of this category, Chise Ninja and Makayla Lanvin, battle against each other, and Ninja wins the grand prize. Mirror Mirror: In this category, the judges need one member from each house to walk the runway in a traditional ballroom "face" category, serving smooth skin, white teeth, and cut bone structure. The competitors from each house are Mother Eyricka Lanvin, Wilma West, Father Jarrell Gucci, Jaime Ninja, Shy Ebony, Cali Balmain, Shyanne Escada, and Christian St. Laurent. Wilma West, Jaime Ninja, Cali Balmain, and Shyanne Escada are chopped and sent backstage, meanwhile the other competitors earn tens across the board and stand to the side. Mother Eyricka Lanvin and Father Jarrell Gucci battle against each other, and Lanvin stays. Christian St. Laurent and Shy Ebony battle, and St. Laurent stays. The final two of this category, Mother Eyricka Lanvin and Christian St. Laurent, battle against each other, and St. Laurent wins the grand prize. Three Fab Mice: In this category, the judges need a trio from each house to walk the runway in perfect unison and matching outfits. The competitors from each house are: Mother Michell'e, Mikoko, and Pretty from the House of St. Laurent; Carlos, Pack-Rat, and Zay from the House of Lanvin; Gravity, Father Jamari, and Torie from the House of Balmain; Sattva, Mother Dolores, and Sharron from the House of Ninja; Mother Isla, Machante, and Shorty from the House of Ebony; and Jazzul, Twilight, and Yyoyo from the House of Escada. The House of Lanvin and the House of Escada earn tens across the board and stand to the side while the rest of the houses are chopped and sent backstage. The final two Houses, Lanvin and Escada, battle against each other, and the House of Lanvin wins the grand prize. After all houses walk the three categories, the judges declare the House of Lanvin as the superior house of the week. The House of Ebony, Escada, Gucci, Ninja, and St. Laurent are declared safe while the House of Balmain and West are in the bottom two. Father Jamari Balmain nominates himself for the one versus one vogue redemption battle and Father James West nominates his daughter Wilma. The judges choose to keep House of Balmain in the competition, as they feel Father Jamari was the more passionate performer during the battle.: Guest Judge: Tyson Beckford; Challenge: Walk three categories in a fairy-tale themed ball; First Category: Rapunzel Effect; one member from each house must walk the runway serving a hair-oriented performance; First Category Winner: Chise Ninja (House of Ninja); Second Category: Mirror Mirror; one member from each house must walk the runway in this "face" category, serving smooth skin, white teeth, and cut bone structure; Second Category Winner: Christian St. Laurent (House of St. Laurent); Third Category: Three Fab Mice; trios from each house must walk the runway in perfect unison and matching outfits; Third Category Winner: House of Lanvin; Superior House of the Week: House of Lanvin; Bottom Two: House of Balmain and House of West; Eliminated: House of West
3	3	"Circus Bezerkus"	June 4, 2020
MC Dashaun Wesley introduces the main panel of judges and ballroom hall-of-famer Dominique Jackson as this episode's guest judge. Wesley announces this week's challenge is a "Circus Bezerkus" themed ball where the remaining seven houses are required to choreograph and perform a group showcase for the judges. House of Lanvin: Lanvin's performance is a deranged and strange themed circus, where Mother Eyricka is a laboratory professor and Makayla is her helper-minion. The two experiment on their other house members, turning them into monsters. The judges give high praise to Lanvin for their design, concept, and makeup, but felt Mother Eyricka did not command enough attention as the main character of the performance. House of Ninja: Ninja's performance is a Cirque du Soleil inspired Asian-themed circus, where Mother Dolores's character is a freak and is jealous of the beauty of others, so she turns the other house members into freaks just like herself. The judges give Ninja negative critiques as they feel the performance did not showcase the circus theme well, the story was unclear, and the house members were out of sync. The judges give positive critiques for the fashion choices. House of Ebony: Ebony's performance is a freak show rumble-themed circus, where the members are circus freaks and battle against one another. Shorty sprains his foot during rehearsal, but still performs. For the performance, Shy is a human-lion announcer, Mother Isla is the Bearded Lady, Shorty is the Strong Man, Machante is the Psycho Clown, and Xa'Pariis is Medusa the Snake Charmer. The judges give praise for the story line and high-energy introduction to the performance, but feel the house lost steam and became boring as the showcase went on. House of Balmain: Balmain's performance is an It-themed performance, where Calypso is an evil clown that lures Father Jamari to her with a balloon, and turns him into an evil creature like the rest of her followers. Balmain receives glowing critiques from all judges for its cohesive concept and story, costume and design, and performance. House of St. Laurent: St. Laurent's performance is a soulless circus, where Mikoko is a ringleader that captures human souls to trap within his circus. The house receives praise for its fashion choices, but the judges give negative critiques for St. Laurent's vogue performance and overall lack of creativity. House of Escada: Escada's performance is an apocalypse-themed circus freak show, where each member is a different freak riddled with radiation. The judges give high praise for every aspect of the theatrical performance, and appreciate that all five elements of vogue were presented. House of Gucci: Gucci's performance is a The Purge-themed performance. Delicious and Miracle disagree during rehearsal, and Miracle leaves the competition after a heated argument. The judges give positive critiques for Gucci's ability to make the performance feel complete without a fifth member. Law Roach and Dominique Jackson argue over if Gucci's costume and design looks "stunning". Jackson asserts "they're not that stunning", and Delicious Gucci in turn insults the guest judge Jackson, exclaiming "You're not that stunning, Pretty." After the seven houses perform, Escada is named the superior house of the week. The House of Balmain, Ebony, Gucci, and Lanvin are declared safe while Ninja and St. Laurent are in the bottom two. Mother Michelle'e St. Laurent nominates Pretty for the one versus one vogue redemption battle and Mother Dolores Ninja nominates her daughter Chise. The judges choose to keep the House of Ninja in the competition, as they feel Chise had an exceptional performance in the ball and vogue battle, and House of Ninja has performed better than St. Laurent in the competition thus far.: Guest Judge: Dominique Jackson; Challenge: Choreograph and perform a "Circus Bezerkus" themed group showcase; Superior House of the Week: House of Escada; Bottom Two: House of Ninja and House of St. Laurent; Eliminated: House of St. Laurent
4	4	"Wild Wild West"	June 11, 2020
MC Dashaun Wesley introduces the main panel of judges and actor Nico Tortorella as this episode's guest judge. Wesley then announces this week's challenge is a "Wild Wild West" themed money ball where the remaining six houses are required to walk in three categories: Come Up and See Me, Sheriff of Seduction, and Mannequin Showcase. The winners of the "Come Up and See Me" and "Sheriff of Seduction" categories will earn their house a cash prize of $5,000, and the winner of the "Mannequin Showcase" challenge will earn their house $15,000. Jameela explains that the houses will be able to keep cash earnings regardless of their placement in the overall competition. Come up and See Me: In this category, the judges need one member from each house to walk the runway in their finest fashion garments with a spinning element. The competitors from each house are Calypso Balmain, Xa'Pariis Ebony, Delicious Gucci, Mother Eyricka Lanvin, Sattva Ninja, and Twilight Escada. Delicious Gucci and Sattva Ninja are chopped and sent backstage, meanwhile the other competitors earn tens across the board and stand to the side. Calypso Balmain and Xa'Pariis Ebony battle against each other, and Ebony stays. Mother Eyricka Lanvin and Twilight Escada battle against each other, and Escada stays. The final two of this category, Xa'Pariis Ebony and Twilight Escada, battle against each other, and Escada wins the $5,000 prize. Sheriff of Seduction: In this category, the judges need one member from each house to walk the runway in a traditional ballroom "body" category, meaning each competitor must show self-confidence and self-love on the runway in order to "sell" their body to the judges. The competitors from each house are Pack-Rat Lanvin, Mother Isla Ebony, Father Jarrell Gucci, Mother Dolores Ninja, Jazzul Escada, and Father Jamari Balmain. Jazzul Escada is chopped and sent backstage, meanwhile the other competitors earn tens across the board and stand to the side. Pack-Rat Lanvin and Mother Isla Ebony battle against each other, and Lanvin stays. Then, Father Jarrell Gucci, Mother Dolores Ninja, and Father Jamari Balmain battle, and both Ninja and Balmain get two votes while Gucci is eliminated. Mother Dolores Ninja and Father Jamari Balmain battle once more, and Ninja stays. The final two of this category, Pack-Rat Lanvin and Mother Dolores Ninja, battle against each other, and Lanvin wins the $5,000 prize. Mannequin Showcase: In this category, the judges need each house to walk the runway in a Wild Wild West themed showcase in which runway walk and performance are at the forefront. The House of Balmain, Escada, and Gucci receive positive critiques regarding their fashion, but the judges feel that these houses had a lackluster performance and runway, with many members across the three houses being out of sync. The House of Ebony and Lanvin are praised for their fashion, performance, and runway. Leiomy feels that the faces of the House of Lanvin lacked emotion, but Mother Eyricka receives praise for embodying the role of "mother" in all of her performances thus far. The House of Ninja receives glowing critiques for all aspects of its showcase, with Megan loving Chise's performance in the overall competition. The House of Ninja is deemed the winner of this category and earns $15,000. After the six houses walk the three categories, the judges declare the House of Lanvin as the superior house of the week. The House of Balmain, Ebony, and Ninja are declared safe while the House of Escada and Gucci are in the bottom two. Jameela announces that the bottom two houses are receiving another chance and are allowed to stay another week without taking part in the vogue redemption battle.: Guest Judge: Nico Tortorella; Challenge: Walk three categories in a Wild Wild West themed money ball; First Category: Come up and See Me; one member from each house must walk the runway in their finest fashion garments with a spinning element to win $5,000 for their entire house; First Category Winner: Twilight Escada (House of Escada); Second Category: Sheriff of Seduction; one member from each house must walk the runway serving "body" to win $5,000 for their entire house; Second Category Winner: Pack-Rat Lanvin (House of Lanvin); Third Category: Mannequin Showcase; each house must walk the runway in a Wild Wild West themed showcase, in which walk and performance are at the forefront, to win $15,000; Third Category Winner: House of Ninja; Superior House of the Week: House of Lanvin; Bottom Two: House of Escada and House of Gucci; Eliminated: None
5	5	"Remember the Times"	June 18, 2020
Guest Judge: Kelly Osbourne; Challenge: Perform in two vogue categories in an ancient Egyptian themed ball; First Category: March of the Mummies; one member from each house must perform a freestyle old-way vogue performance; First Category Winner: Jeter Gucci (House of Gucci); Second Category: Warrior Guardians; each house must perform a vogue performance, which must showcase the "floor performance" element of vogue; Superior House of the Week: House of Gucci; Bottom Two: House of Ebony and House of Lanvin; Eliminated: House of Ebony
6	6	"Intergalactic"	June 25, 2020
Guest Judge: Taylor Bennett; Challenge: Perform in two categories in an outer-space themed ball; First Category: Rise of the Fembots; one member from each house must perform a freestyle vogue femme performance; First Category Winner: Jamari Balmain (House of Balmain); Second Category: Take Me to Your Leader; each house must present a performance centered around one member while wearing bizarre-themed fashion; Superior House of the Week: House of Lanvin; Bottom Two: House of Escada and House of Ninja; Eliminated: House of Ninja
7	7	"Capes & Tights"	July 2, 2020
Guest Judge: Winnie Harlow; Challenge: Walk four categories in a Superhero themed money ball against mysterious super-villains; First Category: Queen Titans; First Category Winner: Jamari Balmain (House of Balmain); Second Category: Elastic Fantastic; Second Category Winner: Carlos Lanvin (House of Lanvin); Third Category: Super Fashionista; Third Category Winner: Eyricka Lanvin (House of Lanvin); Fourth Category: Wonder Twin Power; Fourth Category Winner: Super-Villains (Honey Balenciaga and Lolita Leopard); Superior House of the Week: House of Lanvin; Bottom Two: None; Eliminated: None
8	8	"Atlantis"	July 9, 2020
Guest Judge: Tamar Braxton; Challenge: Mega-Houses Balscada (Balmain and Escada) and La'Gorgeous (Lanvin and Gucci) walk four categories in an underwater themed ball; First Category: Tales from Atlantis; First Category Winner: Eyricka Lanvin, Makayla Lanvin, and Zay Lanvin (House of La'Gorgeous); Second Category: Octo Pus Pus Party; Second Category Winner: Gravity Balmain, Jazzul Escada, Twilight Escada, and Yyoyo Escada (House of Bal'Scada); Third Category: Merfolk Physiques; Third Category Winner: Jarrell Gucci (House of La'Gorgeous); Fourth Category: To Sea or Not to Sea; Fourth Category Winner: Shyanne Escada and Torie Balmain (House of Bal'Scada); Fifth Category: Rich Fish Bitch; Fifth Category Winner: Jamari Balmain and London Escada (House of Bal'Scada); Superior House of the Week: House of Bal'Scada; Bottom Two: House of Gucci and House of Lanvin (House of La'Gorgeous); Eliminated: House of Gucci
9	9	"Heaven and Hell"	July 9, 2020
Eliminated: House of Escada; Five Elements of Vogue; Hand Performance: Jamari Balmain vs Carlos Lanvin; Catwalk: Cali Balmain vs Eyricka Lanvin; Duckwalk: Torie Balmain vs Makayla Lanvin; Floor Performance: Gravity Balmain vs Pack-Rat Lanvin; Spins and Dips: Calypso Balmain vs Zay Lanvin; Runner-up: House of Lanvin; Winner of Legendary Season One: House of Balmain
