= Protect the Dolls =

T-shirt slogan in support of trans women

The T-shirt designed by Conner Ives makes use of the Big Caslon typeface in all caps with left-justified alignment.

Protect the Dolls, usually stylized in all caps, is a slogan in support of transgender women that was taken from the 1980s Ballroom scene and introduced on a viral white T-shirt by American fashion designer Conner Ives. Ives came up with the phrasing the night before his show, and it has since become a phrase adopted by the wider LGBTQ community. First appearing in public at the end of his London Fashion Week show on 23 February 2025, it has been worn by several celebrities including Pedro Pascal, Madonna, Troye Sivan, and Addison Rae, with a variation worn by Mariah Carey. The official T-shirts as of September 2025 raised US$600,000 for the American charity Trans Lifeline, though Ives later switched to using the profits to fund the British charity Not a Phase.

Variants of the slogan have been used, including Let the Dolls Play, in support of transgender women in sports, and Elect the Dolls, used by the transgender wing of the Green Party of England and Wales to support their trans candidates in local elections. Dupes of the t-shirt are prevalent.

== Background ==
The term "doll" is slang within the transgender and wider LGBTQ community, used to positively refer to a feminine trans woman. This use originated in the Ballroom culture among Black and Latina trans women in the 1980s.

The T-shirts have followed the nonconsecutive re-election of Donald Trump, who had recently declared that the government would recognize only two genders. Ives himself is friends with several transgender women and the women who walk his shows are transgender. He generally avoided merging his fashion career and politics, though felt a "shift in the last six months where that level of compartmentalization just didn't really feel relevant anymore," comparing the experiences of transgender people with that of his own as a teenager in an upper-middle-class suburb of New York City and concluding that trans people were facing worse problems.

The T-shirts came amidst a rise in popularity for T-shirts with slogans in general. Prior to the release of the T-shirt, Ives has said he was selling 50 to 60 orders a month. He was known for works that he considered "undupable", usually using reworked deadstock band and sports team merchandise.

== History ==
=== Design, London Fashion Week and initial virality ===
The T-shirt was created by American fashion designer Connor Ives. During the week leading up to his runway show at London Fashion Week in late February 2025, he wrote in his phone's Notes app "make a T-shirt that says something." The slogan itself was workshopped; an early idea was "We Heart the Dolls", in reference to the "I Love New York" slogan, which Ives discarded as he did not feel the need to promote his "love for [his] trans friends" on a T-shirt and wanted something closer to a call and response. Another idea was also "For the Dolls". He saw the protection of his trans friends, however, as "taken for granted", though did not want to create a "feeling of peril." Model and regular collaborator of Ives, Hunter Pifer, who was being fitted in the studio as he workshopped the shirt, pushed him to pick "Protect the Dolls". "Dolls" is an affectionate term for a transgender woman, linking to the 1980s Ballroom scene. Ives found the word "familiar," and "approachable". It is a term that is ubiquitous in some LGBTQ circles, but as of April 2025 is less known to mainstream culture. He has said he will leave it "up to the interpreter to decide" whether the term implies a fixation on physical appearance, plasticity, or collectability.

He proceeded to create the original shirt the night before the show, finding a deadstock white T-shirt and using heat-transfer paper to print "Protect the Dolls" in all caps, taking two to three minutes to do so. The slogan appears in black in the Big Caslon serif typeface in all caps and is left-justified. The t-shirts used are crew neck.

At the end of his show on 23 February 2025, Ives wore the shirt himself when walking down the runway, a move inspired by the similar way Alexander McQueen ended his Spring/Summer 2006 runway show with a T-shirt bearing the words "We Love You Kate", in reference to Kate Moss who was gaining negative attention from the British tabloids at the time.

The next morning, Ives woke up to 400 emails filling his "whole inbox", asking where to buy the T-shirt. Starting from 5 pm GMT on 26 February 2025, he sold them for £75 (around US$99); about 30% of the price was being used for raw material costs, production, printing, and shipping, with the rest of its proceeds being donated to the nonprofit community group and crisis hotline Trans Lifeline.

=== Wear by celebrities and high sales ===
Several celebrities wore the T-shirt, and have broadcast this publicly. Pedro Pascal, whose sister Lux Pascal is transgender, was photographed wearing it next to DJ Honey Dijon on his 50th birthday. Designer Haider Ackermann, partner of Ives' publicist, posed with the shirt next to actor Tilda Swinton, who ordered several of the shirts herself. Singer Troye Sivan wore it during his Coachella 2025 guest performance in Charli XCX's set, and later posed next to her as well as Lorde and Billie Eilish in a photo he posted to Instagram. Sivan's performance helped sell 200 pieces of the T-shirt in less than 24 hours. Addison Rae also wore it at Coachella 2025, and Tate McRae did so also. Ives has stated that he saw someone wearing a dupe of the t-shirt on the streets on London soon after the Coachella performance.

By 18 April Ives had sold £190,235 (about US$252,600) of the T-shirts, and said he was "putting up like 1,000 units in the morning and by the midafternoon they were gone." Two drops of the T-shirts, nearly 2,000 of them, sold out by 20 April, with further pre-sales taking place before a planned indefinite opening of sales. These were possibly spurred by a negative reaction to the UK Supreme Court ruling that transgender women would not be defined as "women" for the purposes of the Equality Act 2010. Pascal wore the shirt again in response to this at the London premiere of the film Thunderbolts* on 22 April. On 29 May Madonna posted a photo of herself wearing the Protect the Dolls T-shirt on Instagram.

Mariah Carey wore a pink jacket with the slogan written on the back during Brighton Pride in August. Later that month, Lisa Nandy, UK Secretary of State for Culture, Media and Sport, wore a T-shirt with the words "protect the dolls" at Pride in Leigh, this shirt having been made for the local event. The anti-trans advocacy group Sex Matters criticised Nandy for doing so. In September, Sabrina Carpenter referenced it on a MTV Video Music Awards performance in which she also called for trans rights to be respected. On 26 September, Ives announced that over US$600,000 had been "raised and donated" to Trans Lifeline from the sale of the shirts. In October, Glamour UK declared "The Dolls" as their Women of the Year, and featured nine transgender models—Mya Mehmi, Dani St James, Shon Faye, Taira, Maxine Heron, Munroe Bergdorf, Bel Priestley, and Munya and Ceval Omar—on the cover, each wearing a Protect The Dolls shirt. J. K. Rowling responded negatively to the cover. In December, Carey's Brighton Pride jacket sold for $5,500 at auction with the profits going to GLAAD's Transgender Media Program.

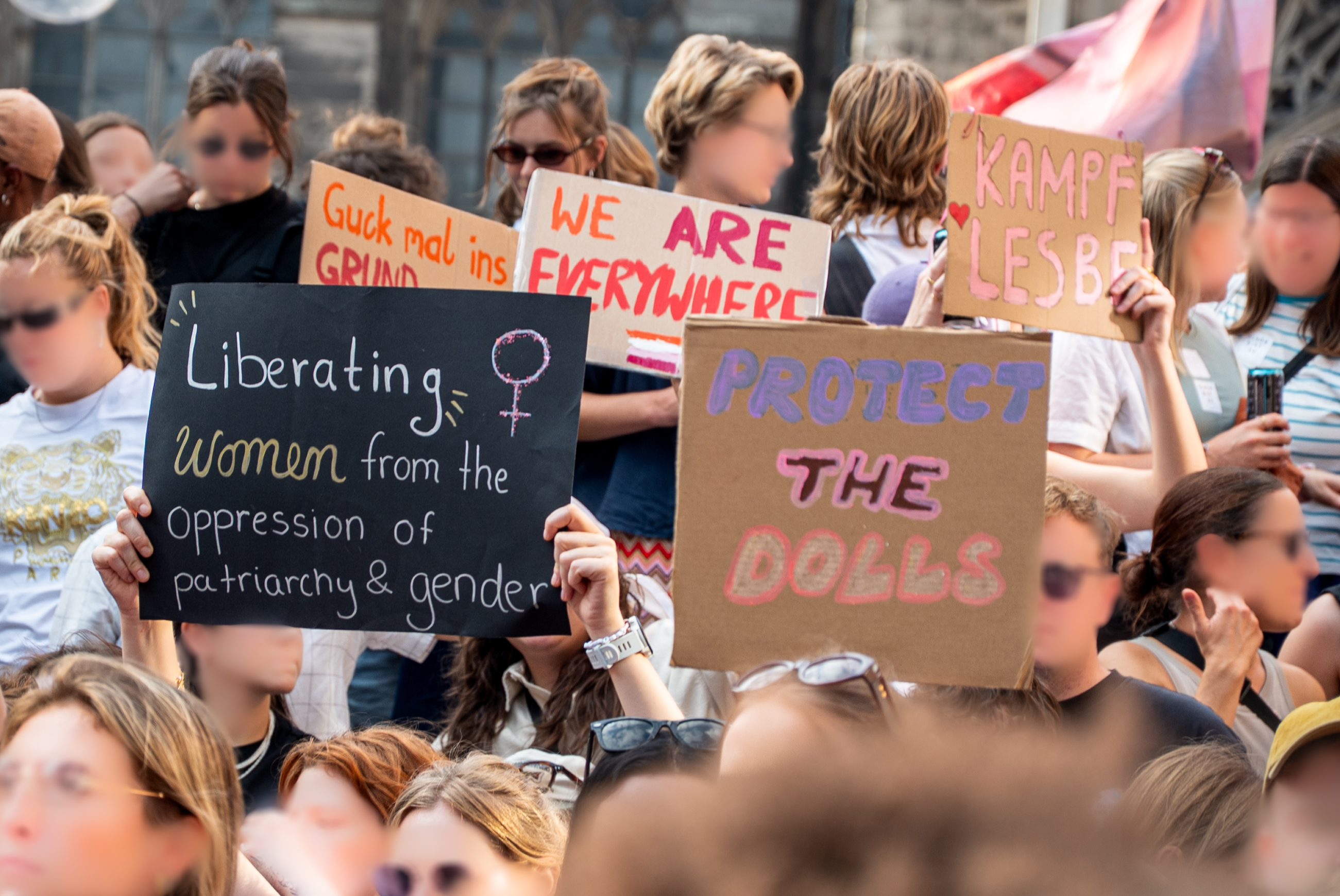
A homemade Protect the Dolls sign at Dyke* March Cologne, Germany

By March 2026, Ives had sold around 15,000 of the t-shirts, and had switched to funding the British charity Not a Phase with the profits. Dupes of the t-shirt in various styles had become available in over 100 different iterations on online shops including TikTok Shop, Amazon, Shein, Temu and Etsy. Ives, with concerns that the profits from these dupes are not going to charity, has attempted to combat this by trying to trademark parts of his design; his company's managing director has stated that this process is "not about trying to own the phrase. It’s about protecting the project and making sure it can’t be commercially exploited in a way that takes support away from the communities it was created for." On 17 March, Connor Ives worked with MAC Cosmetics's charity lipstick line Viva Glam to release a black version of the t-shirt with white text, alongside a pink-beige lipstick.

==== Controversy on Strictly Come Dancing ====
On 10 October 2026, the BBC removed the slogan from its broadcast of the Strictly series 24 episode featuring Bethany Antonia dancing with Nancy Xu; it had been included on Antonia's tee shirt in a montage previously shown by the broadcaster, but was blurred to appear as a plain white shirt when the episode aired. Hamish Steele responded to the incident by calling the BBC "institutionally transphobic". The BBC stated that the shirt was censored as "standard practice" to reduce any "overt branding or slogans" for broadcast.

== Variants ==
On 9 May 2025, in response to The Football Association' s announcement that transgender women would not be allowed to play in women's football in England, the grassroots football club Goal Diggers announced its own version of the T-shirt, reading "Let The Dolls Play". Coincidentally, the football fans' community Baller FC (Friends Collective) also unveiled a T-shirt with the same text in a similar time frame.

At the Green Party of England and Wales autumn conference 2026, the Trans Greens launched a campaign titled Elect the Dolls, a play on Protect the Dolls, for the UK's local elections in May 2026.
