= Kiki (2016 film) =

- Film poster
- Directed by: Sara Jordenö
- Written by: Sara Jordenö; Twiggy Pucci Garçon
- Starring: Gia Love; Christopher Waldorf
- Release date: January 26, 2016 (Sundance)
- Running time: 96 minutes
- Countries: United States; Sweden
- Language: English

Kiki is a 2016 documentary film co-written and directed by Sara Jordenö. A co-production between the United States and Sweden, it takes place in New York City, and focuses on the "drag and voguing scene [and] surveys the lives of LGBT youth of color at a time when Black Lives Matter and trans rights are making front-page headlines". Considered an unofficial sequel to the 1990 documentary film Paris Is Burning, the film profiles several young LGBTQ people of colour participating in contemporary African-American LGBTQ ball culture.

The film premiered at the Sundance Film Festival on January 26, 2016. It was subsequently screened at the 66th Berlin International Film Festival, where it won a Teddy Award as the best LGBTQ-related documentary film.

Jordenö was invited to create the film by Twiggy Pucci Garçon, a leader in the Kiki community in New York. She co-wrote the film with them. Jordenö was able to film her subjects over the course of several years. She was able to follow two of the film's subjects Gia Marie Love and Izana Vidal as they went through their own transitions as trans women.

== Kiki and Paris Is Burning ==
Movie critics such as Fionnuala Halligan, Glenn Kenny, Justin Chang, Rhienna Guedry, Tre'vell Anderson and Hans Pedersen regard Kiki as a sequel to Paris Is Burning because they both cover similar topics such as homelessness, HIV/AIDS, and violence against LGBT youth. Tre'vell Anderson's review mentions how both movies also follow queer and transgender people of color as they traverse the drag, genderqueer and ball culture scenes in New York along with their daily lives.

The drag and ball scene are venues in which many queer and transgender people of color can find community as well as express themselves. Unlike the movie Paris is Burning, Kiki is more intertwined with activism and education as it focuses more on people between the ages of 13 and 24 instead of older queer and transgender individuals.

The issues that transgender youth of color face are given more screen time than in Paris is Burning as well. Pedersen mentions in his review that throughout Kiki, the struggle that many transgender people of color faced was trying to start and continue their hormone replacement therapy as well as sex work, which is something Paris is Burning did not focus on.

Kiki also depicts what it is like for LGBT youth of color to experience discrimination. When it comes to the LGBT neighborhoods, there is some mention of police officers that patrol the neighborhood engaging in homophobia. Fionnuala Halligan states in their review that many of the youth in the film, as a result of the discrimination that they face from society, have to navigate taking part in sex work as a means to support themselves.

This is also where the ballroom and drag scenes come into play as many of these youths use these avenues to claim space that otherwise would be denied to them. As Halligan states within their review, Kiki is a film that is glamorous, but also educates its audience and depicts the very serious realities that many LGBT youth face.

== HIV/AIDS activism in Kiki ==
Around 30 years after the AIDS Crisis, Glenn Kenny thinks that many people believe the situation is handled, but in Kiki, the impact of HIV/AIDS is still seen within the LGBT community. Within the kiki scene, there is a family-like connection between the people impacted by HIV/AIDS, as the rest of the world is unaware of contemporary effects of these diseases. The foundation of the kiki scene is to help educate at-risk LGBT youth about HIV/AIDS through various means. Twiggy Pucci Garçon, Gia Marie Love, and Chi Chi Mizrahi are well-known leaders in the kiki scene and are strong advocates for HIV and STI prevention, which is depicted in the film. All three work with programs or organizations, such as Cyndi Lauper's True Colors Fund, to help spread awareness about HIV and STI prevention, as shown in the film.

One of the major reasons for including HIV/AIDS activism within the kiki scene and the movie is to help people understand and complicate the stigma surrounding blackness and queerness, as many of the members of the kiki scene are young, black people. Garçon mentions how they have personally lost 25 people who they were close to due to AIDS, explaining why HIV/AIDS activism is so important to them and the kiki scene. There is a strong focus on community education within the film to help show the youth that this tight knit community cares for them and wants to keep them safe. The film discusses how education and activism can be difficult considering all of the negative stigma around being LGBT identified, black, young, and HIV positive. Gia Marie Love, who identifies as trans, also explains how there is a lack of focus on HIV and STI prevention among the trans community.

== See also ==
- List of LGBT-related films of 2016
- Kiki (social gathering)
