= Crystal LaBeija =

American drag queen, trans woman, founder of the House of LaBeija

- Crystal LaBeija in the film The Queen (1968)
- Born: 1930s
- Died: 1982 or 1990s
- Other name: Crystal LaAsia
- Occupation: Drag performer
- Known for: Co-founder of ball culture

Crystal LaBeija (born 1930s, died 1982 or 1990s) was an American drag queen and trans woman who co-founded the House of LaBeija in 1968. The House is often credited as starting the house system in ball culture. She became a mother figure for homeless LGBTQ youth.

== Career ==
In the early 1960s, before the emergence of regular balls, New York's drag culture was divided along racial lines—the Pattie Girls (white), the La Chanels (Black), and the Delightful Ladies (Latina). Via the latter group, it became common parlance of the moment to use the phrase la bella—Spanish for "the beautiful"—to enhance one's image or merely describe another person. Crystal, originally working and competing on the Manhattan drag circuit under the name of Crystal LaAsia, was widely known for her beauty and later adopted the phrase as her permanent moniker, with a rearticulated spelling ("Beija") of the -ll- sound in bella [ˈbe.ʝa]. In the 1960s and 1970s, drag queens of color were expected to whiten their appearance to help their chances at winning competitions and they often faced racist environments. LaBeija was one of only a few African American drag queens to be awarded a "Queen of the Ball" title at a drag ball organized by whites during this era. In 1967, she was crowned Miss Manhattan.

LaBeija subsequently competed in the 1967 Miss All-America Camp Beauty Pageant held at New York City Town Hall, a competition documented in The Queen (1968). In a scene towards the end of the documentary, LaBeija, upset with the perceived racism of the white-run balls, accused the pageant organizer Flawless Sabrina of rigging the judging in the favor of a white queen, Rachel Harlow.

Refusing to participate further in a discriminatory system, LaBeija worked with another Black drag queen, Lottie LaBeija, to host a ball just for Black queens. She agreed to participate in the event so long as she was highlighted in the ball. This event, the first to be hosted by a House, was titled "Crystal & Lottie LaBeija presents the first annual House of LaBeija Ball at Up the Downstairs Case on West 115th Street & 5th Avenue in Harlem, NY" and took place in 1972. It was the first time the term "House" was used, coined by LaBeija in order to market the event, which would be a huge success.

LaBeija continued to work as a drag performer and activist throughout the 1970s and 1980s. RuPaul's first experience of a drag performance was seeing LaBeija perform a lipsync routine at a nightclub in Atlanta in 1979.

== Death ==
In 2019, Rolling Stone reported that LaBeija died of liver failure in 1982. However, in 1993, the New York Times reported that LaBeija was still alive and had attended a revival of The Queen at the Film Forum in New York. The article reported that LaBeija was still "a fixture in the drag world" and had a reunion of sorts with contest winner Harlow. "She was very very lovely to me", Harlow is quoted as saying. "She came up to me and kissed me and said hello... She left before the end."

The House of LaBeija's official website states that LaBeija's death occurred in the mid-1990s, as a result of organ failure.

== Legacy ==
LaBeija and The House of LaBeija have had a lasting influence on ball culture and popular culture.

The opening credits of the television series Transparent feature footage of LaBeija from the film The Queen.

The novel The House of Impossible Beauties by Joseph Cassara is a fictional account of New York Ball culture and features characters inspired by LaBeija and members of The House of LaBeija.

The television series Pose features characters and events inspired by LaBeija and ball culture in New York City. The character Elektra Wintour, played by Dominique Jackson, delivers reads similar to the LaBeija's speech at the end of The Queen.

A Season 3 episode of RuPaul's Drag Race All Stars featured drag queen Aja imitating Crystal during the Snatch Game episode.

The current House of LaBeija appeared in the third season of the ballroom competition series Legendary.

Frank Ocean's visual album, Endless, contains a clip of LaBeija on the track "Ambience 001: "In A Certain Way."

The Crystal LaBeija Organizing Fellowship offers a 1-year fellowship, "open to all Black and Brown, trans, gender non-conforming, and non-binary individuals who belong to the ballroom community". The fellowship empowers fellows "to address the issues impacting the lives of transgender women, transgender men, gender non-conforming, and non-binary people in the house ball community via community building, economic empowerment, advocacy, and activism through wellness and social justice lenses."

== See also ==
- LGBTQ culture in New York City
- List of LGBTQ people from New York City
- Drag queen
- Ball culture
- Drag pageantry
