= William Dorsey Swann =

Formerly enslaved person and activist, first person to identify as a drag queen

- Born: November 4, 1860; Maryland, U.S.
- Died: c. December 23, 1925 (aged 65); Hancock, Maryland, U.S.
- Other name: "the Queen" "the Queen of Drag"
- Known for: Gay liberation activist; first drag queen

William Dorsey Swann (November 4, 1860 – c. December 23, 1925) was an American activist. An African-American born into slavery, Swann was the first person in the United States to lead a gay resistance group and the first known person to self-identify as a "queen of drag".

== Early life ==
Swann was born November 4, 1860 into slavery. He was the fifth oldest child in a Protestant family with 13 children. He was enslaved in Hancock, Maryland. After the Civil War, his parents were able to buy a farm. Swann's first job was working as a hotel waiter. When Swann was 24 years old, he was caught stealing books from the Washington Library Company and an item from his employers' home. Swann pled guilty to petty larceny and was sentenced to six months in jail.

Swann's former employers, the sentencing judge, and the Assistant US Attorney supported a presidential pardon for Swann, arguing that Swann was "free from vice, industrious, refined in his habits, and associations, gentle in his disposition, courteous in his bearing". The petitioners emphasized his efforts to improve his education and to provide for his family, and that his former employers would happily offer permanent employment as the college janitor.

== Activism ==
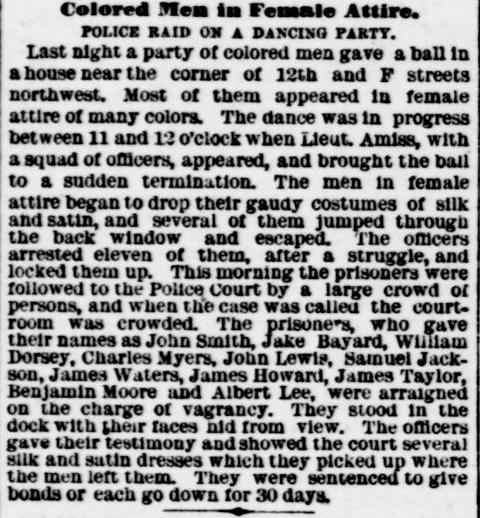
News article in the Evening Star newspaper about a raid on a dancing party in Washington DC involving men in female attire mentioning William Dorsey.

During the 1880s and 1890s, Swann organized a series of drag balls in Washington, D.C. He called himself the "queen of drag". Most of the attendees of Swann's gatherings were men who were formerly enslaved who gathered to dance in their satin and silk dresses. This group, consisting of "former slaves and rebel drag queens", was known as the "House of Swann". Because these events were secretive, invitations were often quietly made at places like the YMCA.

Swann participated in dances such as the cakewalk, a dance performed by enslaved people in America, mimicking the mannerisms of plantation owners. The cakewalk's improvisational movements and subtle expressions of communication were an inspiration source of voguing, the style popularized in Harlem's ball scene.

Swann was arrested in police raids numerous times, including in the first documented case of an arrest for female impersonation in the United States on April 12, 1888. This occurred at Swann's thirtieth birthday celebration. According to The Washington Post, he was "arrayed in a gorgeous dress of cream-colored satin". After police raided the birthday celebration, Swann was "bursting with rage", as he stood up to one of the arresting officers and declared, "You is no gentleman".

Swann's choice to resist that night "rather than to submit passively to his arrest marks one of the earliest-known instances of violent resistance in the name of gay rights". Twelve other African-American men were arrested at the raid. As many as seventeen others escaped that night. The arrests made at Swann's parties were published in the local newspapers, so townsfolk risked their reputation by attending. However, "acts of public shaming like this one are the only reason we now know who Swann was. The identities and stories of the men who escaped capture have been lost to history."

This public shaming made it more difficult for Swann to throw parties secretly. In 1896, he was convicted of "keeping a disorderly house", a euphemism for running a brothel, and was sentenced to 10 months in jail. After his sentencing, he requested a pardon from President Grover Cleveland. This request was denied, but Swann was the first American on record who pursued legal and political action to defend the LGBTQ community's right to gather.

== Relationships ==
Swann was known to have been close with Pierce Lafayette and Felix Hall, two men who had also both been enslaved and who formed the earliest documented male same-sex relationship between enslaved Americans. Pierce Lafayette and Swann had an intimate relationship, often attending galas together.

== Later life ==
When Swann stopped organizing and participating in drag events, his brother Daniel J. Swann continued to make costumes for and participate in the drag community for almost 50 years. Two of his brothers had actively participated in Swann's drag balls.

== Death ==
Swann died circa December 23, 1925, at 65 in Hancock, Maryland. He was cremated. After his death, local officials burned his home.

== Legacy ==
Swann is the subject of the non-fiction book The House of Swann: Where Slaves Became Queens by Channing Joseph. It is set for publication by Picador.

Swann is known as the first drag queen. As a black gay man, Swann paved the way for future drag queens and gay men of color. His legal efforts sparked a conversation about the LGBTQ+ community and may have even been one of the first instances of LGBTQ+ activism in the United States. There was little support at the time of his activism, and the ideas were not widespread. He helped lay the foundation for future activists such as Marsha P. Johnson and others who fought during the "modern LGBTQ rights movements".

In 2022, the Dupont Circle Advisory Neighborhood Commission approved a resolution declaring the already-existing Swann Street, a road stretching for five blocks in Northwest Washington, D.C., to be named after William Dorsey Swann. Before that resolution, the street's original namesake was likely the 19th-century politician Thomas Swann.

On August 8, 2025, a marker honoring Swann was installed in T Street Park, at the intersection of Swann Street, New Hampshire Avenue, 17th Street, and T Street, N.W.

== See also ==
- African-American LGBT community
- Ball culture
- Cross-dressing
- Drag queen
- LGBT social movements
