= Tolarian Community College =

YouTube channel

YouTube information
- Channel: Tolarian Community College
- Years active: 2013–present
- Subscribers: 1.22 million
- Views: 517 million
- Last updated: 3 November 2025
- Website: tolariancommunitycollege.com

Tolarian Community College is a YouTube channel focused on the collectible card game Magic: The Gathering. The channel is run and presented by Brian Lewis, and the channel's writer is Jesse Robkin. Lewis is known on the channel as "The Professor", and has an official Flesh and Blood card named after him. The channel hosts games, unboxings, product reviews, gameplay tutorials, analysis, and discussions of lore, as well as a podcast. It has raised over US$1,500,000 for charities.

== Channel ==
The channel was started in August 2013, and is named after the Magic: The Gathering card Tolarian Academy. It is run by Brian Lewis, "The Professor" and head writer Jesse Robkin, a writer, filmmaker and the 2025 Magic: The Gathering United States Regional Champion.

The Tolarian Community College channel provides videos of games, unboxings, product reviews, gameplay tutorials, lore and analysis as well as a podcast. The channel has also covered antisemitism, sexism, racism and transphobia within the Magic: The Gathering community. The channel became Lewis's full-time job after he set up a Patreon account. Writers who have worked on the channel include Carmen Klomparens, as well as Robkin. Lewis has also appeared on other Magic channels, including playing a game with Post Malone.

== Charity work ==
=== Trans Lifeline ===
Since 2020, Tolarian Community College has run an annual fundraiser for the charity Trans Lifeline, a phone support and crisis hotline for transgender people. In 2020 the channel raised US$120,000; in 2021, US$220,000; in 2023, US$240,000; in 2024, US$418,000; and in 2025 over US$560,000.

=== Fundraiser for black communities ===
In 2020 Tolarian Community College raised more than US$140,000 for black community charities Saving Our Sons and Sisters International and the Trans Women of Color Collective. The channel raised this money through the sale of rare Magic cards, selling cards from some of the game's earliest sets including a copy of Black Lotus.

=== Serious Fun ===
In October 2019 the channel ran a fundraiser for Serious Fun, a charity that runs summer camps for children with serious illnesses. The Professor raised US$11,000 for the charity by shaving his head.

== Products ==
=== Flesh and Blood card ===
In 2023, the trading card game Flesh And Blood created "The Professor" card based on Lewis as part of the "Round the Table: LSS x TCC" box set. The card is a "hero" card and was illustrated by Simon Dominic.

=== The Academic card box ===
In 2022 The Professor collaborated with game company Gamegenic to produce a Magic: The Gathering card box called "The Academic". A Kickstarter campaign was run for the card box with a goal of US$50,000; almost US$4,000,000 worth of preorders were placed.
