= Lucy Clark =

English football manager (born 1971)

Personal information
- Date of birth: 1971 (age 54–55)

Managerial career
- Years: Team
- 2021–: Truk United
- 2024–: Sutton United Women

Lucy Clark (born 1971) is an English football manager and former referee. She was the first transgender referee and is also the first out trans competitive association football manager in the country. She is additionally the founder and manager of TRUK United, a dedicated football club for transgender people.

== Career ==
A lifelong fan of Sutton United, Clark first realised she was trans in the early 1980s before she was ten, and has stated that football provided a life-saving distraction from that. She first coached a team when she was 16 and subsequently gained a UEFA B coaching licence and managed a men's non-league club in Essex. Clark came out to her then-girlfriend at age 30 in 2001 and then quit football management to focus on refereeing.

Clark was late to the West Ham United vs Arsenal game at the 2016–17 EFL Cup after suffering a heart attack due to a blocked artery, one of several she had in 2017, though her doctor initially misdiagnosed indigestion. She planned to stop refereeing after the 2017–18 season after finding that she was struggling to stay closeted, though aborted her plans after spending Christmas that year in hospital and came out as trans the following year. Guinness World Records subsequently certified her as the first openly transgender football referee in the world.

Clark and her wife went on to found Trans Radio (TRUK) and the transgender advice helpline TRUK Listens. She responded to frequent contact from transgender people wishing to play football by founding TRUK United F.C. in January 2021, which she played for and managed. TRUK United F.C. fielded both the country's first all-trans women's team and first all-trans men's team. In 2023, Clark was nominated for the National Diversity Awards' Positive Role Model Award, featured in the documentary In The Middle, and donated the shirts and boots she wore during her first game presenting as female to Manchester's National Football Museum. She was also refereeing in both the Women's National League and in grassroots men's matches around this time.

Sutton United Women hired her as manager on 24 January 2024, making her the first-ever out transgender manager in the top five divisions of English competitive football. Her first task was to guide the team out of a possible relegation, though her team lost their first game to Fulham F.C. 3–1. She has stated that she faced online abuse after the announcement, including from J. K. Rowling. Clark then signed the former Hastings United player Blair Hamilton as a goalkeeper. A trans woman, Hamilton's team won their August debut match against Haywards Heath 6–0, following which Clark was criticised for the appointment and the team postponed a September match against Ebbsfleet United to avoid odium and potential legal issues.

In 2025, Clark received a nomination for the London & South East Regional Football League Premier Division Manager of the Month award, Amelia Snowdon cited Clark as an inspiration after becoming the second transgender woman to become an FA football team manager in September 2025, and Clark also appeared in a documentary about TRUK United F.C. co-directed by Cameron Richards and Charlie Tidmas, We'll Go Down in History.
