= Honey Balenciaga =

American dancer

- Born: Honey Valentine Gonzales; August 15, 2001 (age 25); New York City, New York, U.S.
- Occupations: Dancer, model, actress
- Years active: 2017–present
- Known for: Renaissance World Tour, Cowboy Carter Tour, Legendary
- Dancing career
- Current group: House of Balenciaga
- Former groups: House of LaBeija; House of Juicy Couture
- Dances: Vogue (Vogue Fem) jazz Contemporary tap ballet

Honey Balenciaga (also known as Honey Valentine Gonzales) is an American dancer. She was part of Beyoncé's Renaissance World Tour and Cowboy Carter Tour. She also competed on Legendary and appeared in the music video to Lady Gaga's "Abracadabra" (2025).

== Early life ==
She was born on August 15, 2001, to a Honduran immigrant father and a Nuyorican mother in New York. She grew up in East New York, Brooklyn.

== Career ==
=== Dance ===
Gonzales started dancing as a child, learning jazz, contemporary, tap, and ballet. She was later introduced to voguing. She was given the name 'Honey' by her trans-mother, who called her voguing "sweet like honey". She joined the House of LaBeija in 2017, then the Houses of Juicy Couture and Balenciaga.

In 2020 and 2021, Gonzales appeared on the voguing competition TV show Legendary.

In 2023, she was part of Beyoncé's Renaissance World Tour, where she was a background dancer as well as representing the Vogue fem category on the ballroom battle segment of the show.

In 2025, she joined Beyoncé again during her Cowboy Carter Tour as a background dancer, and she had a solo dance section during the Ballroom Dance Battle. She appeared in Lady Gaga's "Abracadabra" music video. She also performed as a background dancer for Sabrina Carpenter at the VMAs.

=== Modeling ===
She appeared in Coach and Nike ad campaigns.

In 2024, She was part of Louboutin's 'Storytelling' campaign.

In 2025, she modeled for Windowsen's collaboration with Nike in Shanghai.

=== Acting ===
Gonzales guest starred on season 2 of the Netflix show Survival of the thickest.
