= Trans Lifeline =

North American transgender support hotline

- Formation: 2014
- Founder: Greta Martela, Nina Chaubal
- Type: Nonprofit organization
- Purpose: Peer support for transgender people
- Executive Director: kai alviar horton
- Chair of the Board: Ace Sutherland
- Website: translifeline.org

Trans Lifeline is a peer support and crisis hotline 501(c)(3) nonprofit organization offering phone support to transgender people. It is the first transgender crisis hotline to exist in the United States as well as Canada. It is also the only suicide hotline whose operators are all transgender. In 2019, the organization had approximately 95 volunteers in addition to a small paid staff. The US number is (877) 565–8860. The Canada number is (877) 330–6366. The hotline is available Monday–Friday, 10 AM to 6 PM, Pacific time (1 PM to 9 PM Eastern time). It is closed during some holidays.

== Services ==
Trans Lifeline offers peer support for transgender people with a wide range of needs, from feeling lonely to being in crisis. The organization's hotline does not engage in non-consensual active rescue, meaning operators never call 911, police, or emergency services on callers without an expressed request and consent, based on research associating involuntary hospitalization with increased suicide attempts after discharge. Additionally, they believe that calling the police on transgender people in crisis, particularly trans people of color, causes more harm.

The organization previously offered a microgrant program, but suspended it in November 2023 for lack of available funds.

== History ==
=== Establishment ===
Trans Lifeline was founded in 2014 to address the epidemic of suicidality and lack of national resources for the trans community. It was founded by Nina Chaubal and Greta Gustava Martela, two San Francisco software engineers. From founding the organization to their dismissal in 2018, Martela and Chaubal served as Trans Lifeline's Executive Director and Director of Operations, respectively.

By January 2015, the hotline was receiving about 60 calls per day and had about 60 volunteers.

=== Leadership transitions ===
In November 2016, in response to a Tumblr post accusing Trans Lifeline's founders of embezzlement and harassment, the organization published an article on their Medium page denying the allegations of embezzlement and explaining their decision to directly confront individuals who they believe facilitate transphobia. However, Chaubal and Martela were dismissed by the organization's board of directors in 2018 after an internal review found they had diverted $353,703 to unapproved personal purchases and side projects. Chaubal and Martela were able to repay $8,585, and in June 2018, agreed to mediation with Trans Lifeline in which they would repay the remaining amount over the next ten years, in lieu of lawsuit or other recovery.

They were replaced by Sam Ames as interim executive director and Tiffany St. Bunny as Director of Operations. Then-Deputy Executive Director Elena Rose Vera succeeded Ames in March 2019 before stepping down herself in September 2021.

=== Microgrants ===
In 2017, the organization merged with Trans Assistance Project in order to address a socioeconomic component of the trans support. The merger became the organization's microgrants program, which gifted small grants to trans people who were in need of funds to cover the fees associated with legal name and gender marker changes, as well as with updated identification documents. The organization's guiding ethos was "justice-oriented collective community aid," a concept the organization promoted based on the belief that both economic justice and having affirming trans community are part of and key to trans liberation.

The organization also oversaw a program to support incarcerated trans people, called Inside Advocacy. The project provided funds for trans people's commissaries so that they could afford "basic comforts" while imprisoned. The program also worked to provide microgrants to trans people in ICE detention.

Trans Lifeline suspended its microgrants program at the end of November 2023, citing falling donations and increased demand for services caused by an increase in anti-trans legislative efforts. At time of its suspension, the program had donated approximately US$1.5 million in grants averaging $500 per person, with later grants slightly larger due to inflation.

=== Expansions and reductions ===
As of June 2020, the organization had set in motion a Spanish language extension in order to serve Spanish-speakers calling the hotline. This involved recruiting multilingual volunteer staff to answer calls. The new service serving the Spanish speaking community went into effect on July 1, 2020.

Facing a US$2.5 million budget shortfall at the end of 2023, the hotline suspended operations for a two-week hiatus, beginning December 18. It resumed in the new year with reduced operating days and hours.

== Fundraisers and partnerships ==
In a June 2019 interview on the podcast Queery, Trans Lifeline Executive Director Elena Rose Vera stated that 85% of the organization's budget comes from members of the general public in the form of small donations.

- In 2019, the organization was the recipient of funds raised by Vice magazine's Save Point 2019 campaign, a 72-hour marathon gaming stream on the Twitch platform.
- In June 2020, Trans Lifeline partnered with MTV, LOGO, and Kim Petras in order to provide an extra 20 microgrants for youth in need to correct their legal documents, with 75% of applicants selected for these grants to be BIPOC.
- In 2025 the Magic: The Gathering YouTube channel Tolarian Community College fundraised $460,000 for Trans Lifeline.
- Proceeds from the sales of Conner Ives' Protect the Dolls t-shirts were donated to Trans Lifeline.

== See also ==
- The Trevor Project
- Suicide and Crisis Lifeline
