= Conner Ives =

American fashion designer

- Born: 1996 (age 29–30); Bedford, New York, U.S.
- Education: Central Saint Martins
- Label: Conner Ives
- Awards: Finalist, LVMH Prize (2021); BFC Foundation Award (2023); BFC/Vogue Designer Fashion Fund (2025)
- Website: connerives.com

Conner Ives (born 1996) is an American fashion designer based in London. He founded his eponymous label in 2021 and was a finalist for that year's LVMH Prize. In 2025 he created the "Protect the Dolls" T-shirt, sold in support of the trans-led charity Trans Lifeline, which became a viral success. He won the BFC Foundation Award at the 2023 Fashion Awards and the BFC/Vogue Designer Fashion Fund in 2025.

== Early life and education ==
Ives was born and raised in Bedford, New York. He interned with Wes Gordon in New York before moving to London in 2014 to attend Central Saint Martins (CSM). While a student, he dressed model Adwoa Aboah for the 2017 Met Gala; Aboah had commissioned the dress after a swan-embellished deconstructed tuxedo he made for the school's White Show caught her attention. The dress brought him to the attention of Rihanna, who hired him to help create her first Fenty collection as an in-house designer. He also put out his own first collection while still in school. In 2018, he was hired by the London fashion boutique Browns to design T-shirt dresses. Ives graduated from CSM with a BA in fashion womenswear in 2020. Due to the COVID-19 pandemic, he did not have a final show for his graduate collection, though the collection, titled "The American Dream", was featured in Vogue.

== Career ==
Ives founded his eponymous label in London in 2021. In April of that year, the LVMH Prize named him one of its nine finalists for 2021.

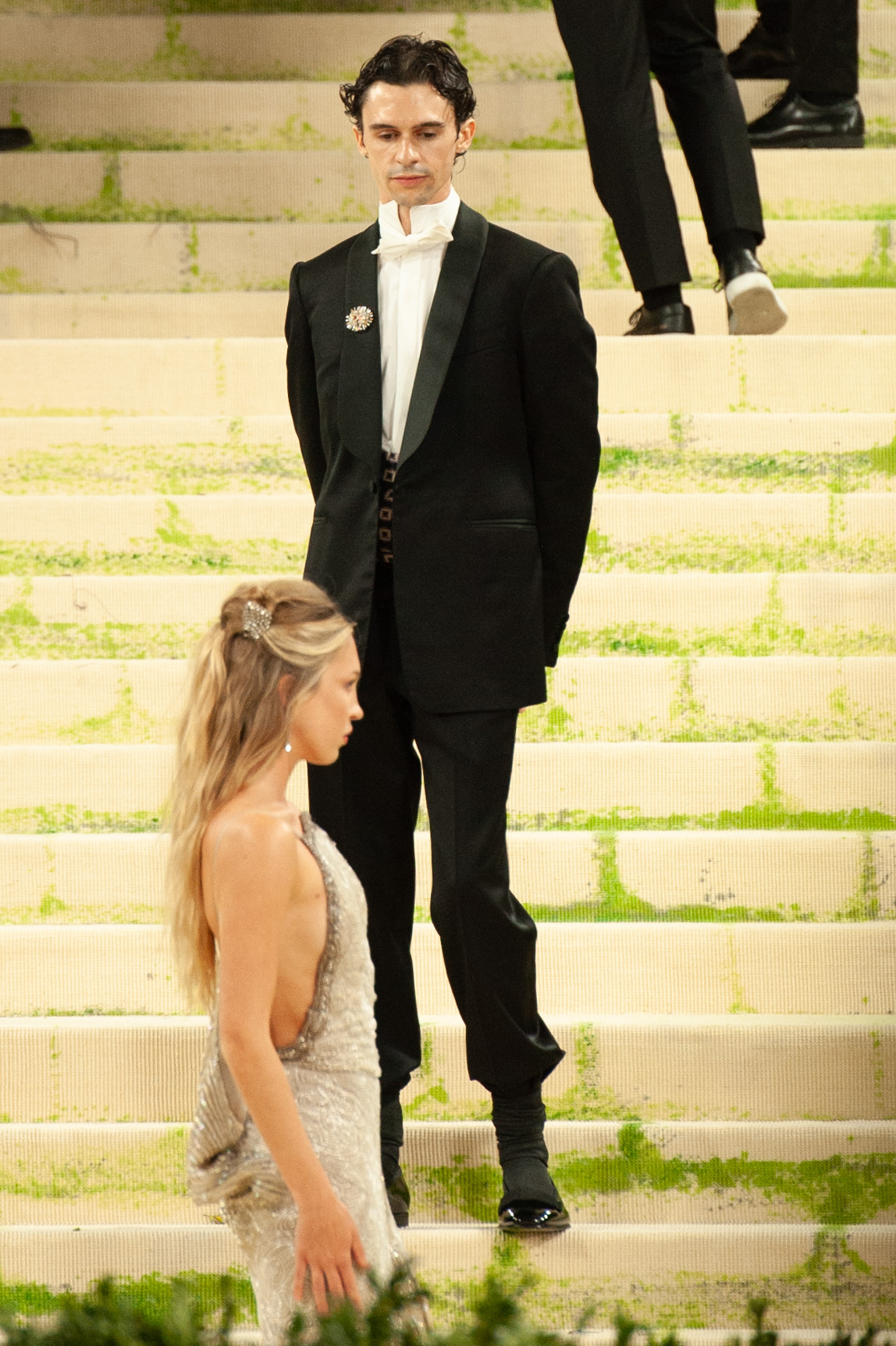
Ives observing Lila Moss in his design at the 2026 Met Gala

A piece from Ives's graduate collection was chosen by Andrew Bolton for the 2021 exhibition "In America: A Lexicon of Fashion" at the Anna Wintour Costume Center of the Metropolitan Museum of Art. At the gala opening for the exhibition, the design was worn by model Natalia Bryant.

He made his runway debut at London Fashion Week in February 2022 with his fall 2022 collection. In December 2023, he won the BFC Foundation Award at The Fashion Awards.

In May 2025, Ives won the BFC/Vogue Designer Fashion Fund, which came with a £150,000 grant and a year of mentorship. He was added to the Business of Fashion's BoF 500 index that year.

At the end of his fall 2025 show at London Fashion Week in February 2025, Ives took his bow wearing a T-shirt reading "Protect the Dolls", a gesture in support of transgender women and a callback to Alexander McQueen's "We Love You Kate" shirt of 2005. He opened pre-orders for the £75 shirt the morning after the show, with all proceeds going to Trans Lifeline, a trans-led American nonprofit. The shirt went viral and was worn by figures including Pedro Pascal, Troye Sivan, and Tilda Swinton. By April 13, 2025, it had raised over $70,000 for the organization; sales went on to raise over $600,000.

In March 2026, Moda Operandi, which had begun carrying the label that year, sold nearly $500,000 of his fall collection at a trunk show. In May, he dressed model Lila Moss for the Met Gala, making her a gown from three 1920s dresses adapted from his fall 2026 collection. In June, he was one of six designers to receive a BFC Fashion Trust award. On September 12, he made his New York Fashion Week debut at The Grill restaurant in Manhattan, showing a spring collection titled "Across the Pond". He was nominated for the Vanguard award at the 2026 Fashion Awards.

== Design approach ==
Ives works largely with vintage and deadstock garments that are reworked into new pieces; the Business of Fashion has estimated that about 75 percent of his materials are recycled. His T-shirt dresses, pieced together from vintage T-shirts and shirred or smocked into new shapes, became a signature of the label. He has described the label's theme as a "new Americana", rooted in memories of the girls and women he grew up with in Bedford.
