= Kiki (social gathering) =

Term which grew out of Black American gay social culture

Kiki (alternately kiking or a ki), is a term which started in ballroom culture and is especially used in Black and LGBT communities. The use of kiki for a gathering was later made more famous in the 2012 song "Let's Have a Kiki" by the Scissor Sisters. Since the 2010s, the term has returned to popular usage within the LGBT community, being loosely defined as a gathering of friends for the purpose of gossiping and chit-chat.

== History ==
While the origins are unknown, it is now popularly used to refer to a social gathering. Kiki originated as part of Black queer house and ballroom culture, where it is believed to imitate the sound of laughter.

This term gained a wider public audience through the 1990 movie Paris Is Burning. From ballroom culture, kiki began to bud off into its other scene, especially those particularly friendly towards Black/Latino members of the LGBT community, as depicted in the 2016 movie, Kiki. Post 2010, due in part to the release of "Let's Have a Kiki" by the Scissor Sisters, and the popularization of drag culture through RuPaul's Drag Race, the word found its way into mainstream culture.

Linguistic and cultural historians generally believe the word kiki is onomatopoeic, mimicking the sound of laughter or the whispering of friends sharing gossip. The term originated within Black and Latino LGBTQ+ house and ballroom culture of New York during the late 20th century.

The kiki scene traces its roots to 1920s ballroom culture, an underground community that emerged in New York City during the Harlem Renaissance as a safe space for queer people of color. In the early 2000s, activists from the ballroom scene — including leaders of the Gay Men's Health Crisis — recognised the need to create a dedicated space for LGBTQ+ youth of color, many of whom were homeless and in need of HIV-prevention services. This gave rise to the distinct kiki scene: a network of younger houses and smaller balls designed to give teenagers a less intimidating, low-pressure space to socialise and support one another.

Unlike the mainstream ballroom community, the kiki scene insists on youth-focused leadership and cultural identity. Members are typically between the ages of 14 and 24.

=== Global spread ===
By the 2020s, the kiki scene had spread beyond New York City to other countries. In Poland, kiki ballroom culture grew as a community space for LGBTQ+ youth, with houses forming as chosen families and organising local balls.
