= Even.com =

American financial services company

Even
- Website type: Private
- Founded: 2015; 11 years ago
- Founder: Jon Schlossberg
- CEO: David Baga
- Industry: Financial technology; Financial services
- Services: Early Wage Access
- Website: www.even.com
- Users: 500,000

Even is an American financial services company. Founded in 2015, Even is headquartered in Oakland, California and provides payroll and accounting services, including earned wage access.

The app simulates salaried wages for hourly by calculating average monthly earnings, and offering paid advances based on its algorithm while moving surplus earnings into savings accounts.

== History ==
Even was founded in 2014 by Jon Schlossberg and a group of other entrepreneurs. The company raised $1.5 million in seed funding that year, led by tech investor Keith Rabois.

The app entered beta testing in 2015, before becoming available to all users in January 2016. Upon launching, the app positioned its earned wage access services as an alternative to traditional payday lending.

In 2017, Walmart partnered with Even to offer earned wage access to its U.S. employees, making the retailer one of the largest employers to adopt the model at the time.

In July 2018, the company raised $40 million during its Series B round of funding, which was again led by Rabois.

In 2020, PayPal CEO Dan Schulman announced that the company would be partnering with Even to offer the service to its employees. As of 2020, the app had over 500,000 users.

On March 1, 2021, David Baga became the new CEO of Even, replacing co-founder Jon Schlossberg.
