= Goal Diggers F.C. =

British women's and non-binary football club

- The crest of Goal Diggers F.C.
- Founded: 2015
- Chair: Gaia Laidler
- League: Non-League
- Website: goaldiggersfootballclub.com

Goal Diggers F.C. (GDFC) is a non-profit grassroots football club for women and non-binary people based in Hackney in London, England. Founded by Fleur Cousens in 2015 and seeing growing player numbers over the subsequent decade, since at least 2025 it has been outspoken in its support of the inclusion of transgender people in sports. It is a non-League club.

== History ==
Goal Diggers F.C. was founded by Fleur Cousens in 2015. It is based in Hackney, and began with the goal to make football more inclusive to women and non-binary people. Cousens ran a campaign titled "Pitch Please", which attempted to call attention to the overbooking of grassroots football pitches by men's teams over women and non-binary people's teams. When the club first started, committee member Gaby Pimentel has noted that it had 20 people who were making use of a community pitch in King's Cross, later expanding over the pitch car park.

In 2022, sportswear brand New Balance partnered with the club. This continued into 2024, when the club had begun renting out a pitch at Haggerston Park. By this time, it had two to three teams playing each week, was running one foreign tour per year, and was hosting somewhat regular queer club nights. Pimentel stated at this time that the club had 200 active members with a closed wait list of 100 people.

Goal Diggers wrote an open letter to the Football Association (FA) in 2025 in protest against an upcoming FA ban on transgender women that was due to come into effect from 1 June. The letter, with over 1,600 supporting signatures, named the recent UK Supreme Court decision on the interpretation of the terms man and woman as a "stain on the country’s reputation", and noted that Goal Diggers would not participate in any leagues affiliated with the FA if the FA's decision went ahead. On 5 May 2025, Cousens, Goal Diggers team members and over 100 others from other London clubs marched in protest against an upcoming ban on transgender women by the Football Association that was due to come into effect from 1 June. They walked 12 miles from the Goal Diggers training ground in Haggerston Park, East London to the FA's offices at Wembley Stadium. This was also to raise funds; by 7 May they had raised £10,000. In addition to this, Goal Diggers announced its own version of the viral Protect the Dolls T-shirt designed by Sophie Scott on 9 May, which instead read "Let The Dolls Play". All proceeds from its sale are directed toward the Good Law Project. At this time, six Goal Diggers club members were transgender. The club had quit one league that was aligned with the FA by 29 May. On 1 June, the day the ban took effect, the club hosted their own Let the Dolls Play tournament.

In November 2025, the club chair was Gaia Laidler, and was fundraising for the gender-affirming care of its players who were forced to use private healthcare due to long NHS waiting lists.

From 24–26 July 2026, Goal Diggers hosted a weekend programme of events that took place on the same dates as London Trans+ Pride. This included being a part of the London Trans+ Pride march on 25 July as part of its football section, as well as hosting their own community football tournament open to women and non-binary players alongside Islington's Queer FA on 26 July.

== Kit ==
In 2021, Goal Diggers introduced the 1921 Collection, designed by Anastasia Kutcha, as their new kit. This kit, with the number 1921 on the back, references the year of the FA's ban on football grounds under their control from hosting any women's matches, a rule that was not lifted until 1971. The kit also features a quote from football captain Alice Kell who responded to the ban that "We play for the love of the game and are determined to go on". In 2025, all club members continued to wear shirts with the number 1921 on the back.
