= TRUK United F.C. =

British transgender football club

- Full name: Trans Radio UK United Football Club
- Founded: 2021
- Manager: Lucy Clark
- Website: trukunitedfc.com

Trans Radio UK United Football Club, simply known as TRUK United, is a British association football club with transgender and non-binary members. Founded in 2021 by Lucy Clark, the club launched a transfeminine team in 2022 and a transmasculine and non-binary team in 2023. Players in these teams vary in skill from semi-professional to amateurs.

== History ==
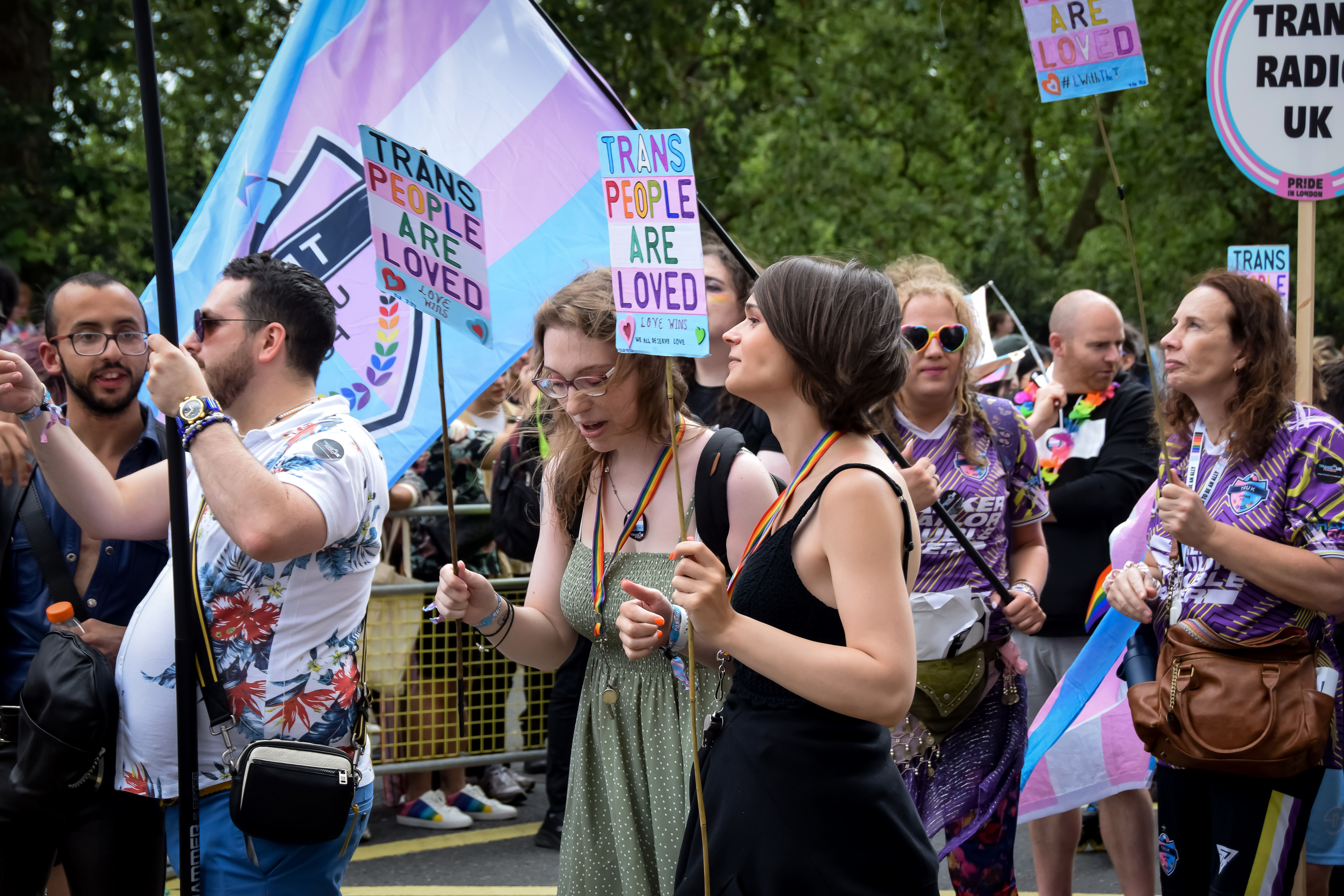
Trans Radio UK and TRUK United F.C. players at Pride in London 2023

TRUK United F.C. was founded by Lucy Clark in January 2021 after she found that transgender people were contacting her wishing to play football. They played their first match on 26 September 2021 against Leatherhead's Friends Fighting Cancer and lost it 3–6. She then started a team consisting of transfeminine players in 2022, who played against Dulwich Hamlet F.C.'s women's team on 31 March that year, prompting discussion surrounding trans inclusion in sport.

TRUK United fielded a transmasculine team, the world's first, against the Dulwich Hamlet F.C. Supporters Team on 21 March 2023, for which they were captained by Arthur Webber. Comprising players scouted on social media, many of whom met shortly before the match, TRUK United lost 1–8 in front of 500 spectators, though images of Parker Dunn scoring their only goal went viral on social media, prompting worldwide support. By September, the club comprised over 200 players from across the UK, with Clark estimating that 70% were trans. The club's transfeminine team playing their transmasculine and non-binary team on 31 March 2024 made the match the first in which all those starting were trans or non-binary.

TRUK United was the subject of the Cameron Richards and Charlie Tidmas documentary We'll Go Down in History, which premiered at the BFI Flare in London on 29 March 2025 and covered its 31 March 2022, 21 March 2023, and 31 March 2024 matches.

== Artistry ==
Players vary in competence from amateurs to semi-professional, with players including Clark, Emmerdale actor Ash Palmisciano, and at least one 60-year-old. The club broadcasts their games online.

== See also ==
- Homosexuality in English football
- Transgender people in sports
