= Dupe (product) =

Imitation consumer good

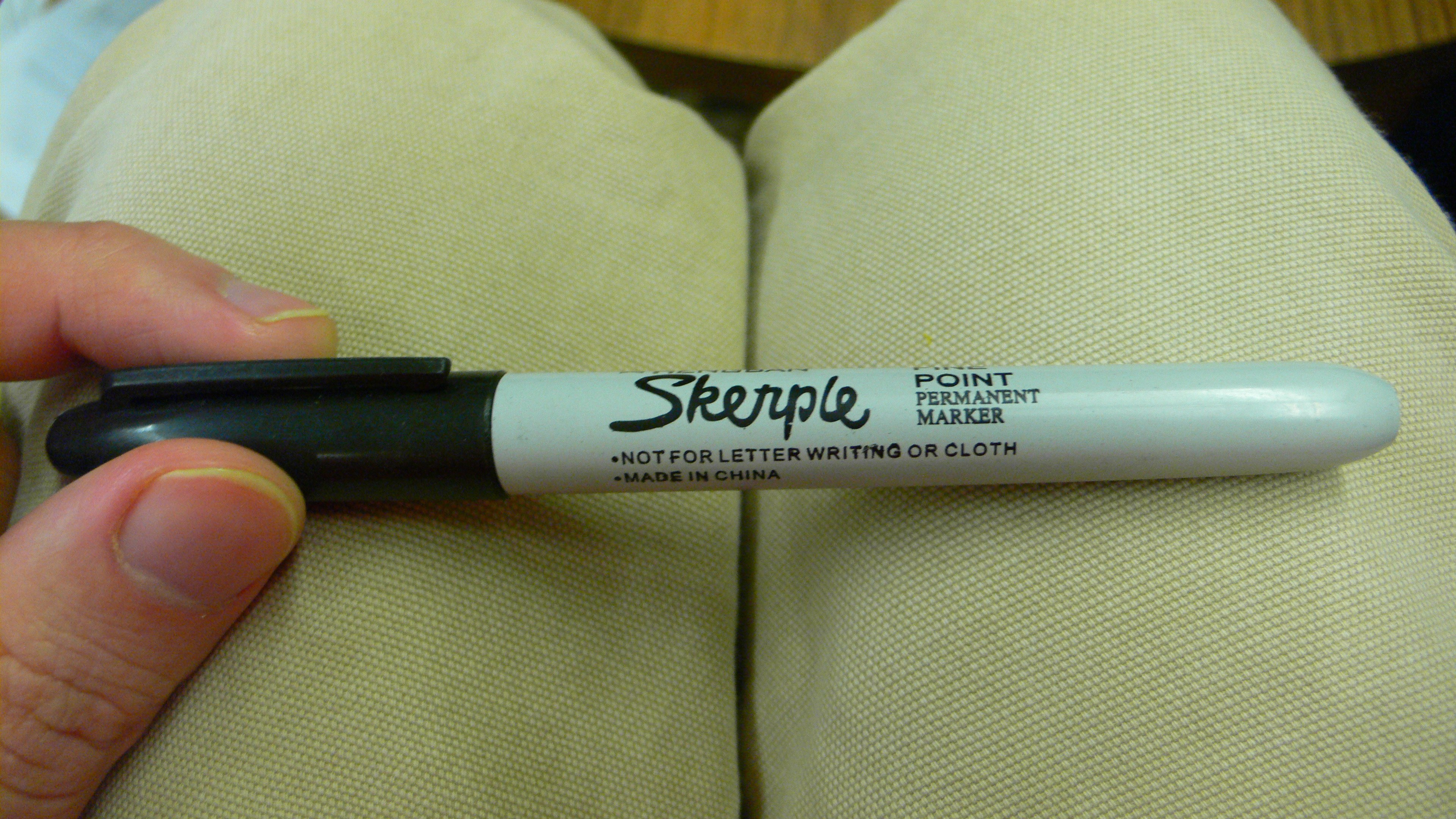
Knockoff Sharpie named "Skerple"

A dupe (also known as a knockoff) is a product similar in appearance, functionality, or design to a higher-end, often more expensive, branded item but sold at a much lower price. Unlike counterfeit products, dupes do not copy trademarked brand names or logos.

Dupe products offer consumers an affordable alternative to luxury goods without significantly compromising quality or style. Dupes are particularly popular in fashion, beauty, and electronics, where the desire for trendy or high-performance items meets budget constraints. Social media platforms and influencers play a significant role in promoting dupes by sharing their discoveries and recommendations with their audiences.

Dupes aren’t usually counterfeit products pretending to be the real thing, but they often resemble the original closely enough that many of them might be considered as knockoffs. They may still be illegal under trademark laws if they confuse consumers or violate patents.

== History ==
=== Fashion ===
A knockoff Peppa Pig robot similar to Playful Penguin Race called the Happy Pig

The concept of knockoff clothing dates back to the early 1900s, when designers would copy clothing from Paris fashion houses. In the United States, department stores would manufacture copies of the latest popular designs from Paris or worn by Hollywood performers. Around 1913, French designer Paul Poiret discovered inexpensive replicas of his designs were being sold in the United States. In the 1940s, around the time designers began putting visible labels on their clothing, French fashion houses like Chanel and Dior would license their designs and provide materials to American department stores to manufacture knockoffs, which would be sold alongside their higher-priced authentic counterparts.

Apparel (clothing, shoes, accessories, etc.) are classified as "functional items" and their designs are generally not protected by copyright laws in the many countries, including the United States and United Kingdom. According to the U.S. Copyright Office, designs of useful articles like clothing and accessories are only protected "to the extent that, such design incorporates pictorial, graphic, or sculptural features that can be identified separately from, and are capable of existing independently of, the utilitarian aspects of the article." While some designs can be protected with a design patent that lasts 15 years, the cost and time to receive a design patent, which is typically over year, can be prohibitive due to the cyclical and seasonal nature of fashion.

Dupe culture, driven largely by Gen Z and Millennials, has emerged as a significant trend in the shopping world. These generations are increasingly seeking out dupes, which are affordable alternatives to high-end products, in an effort to maintain style without breaking the bank. This movement is fueled by social media, where influencers and users share their favorite dupes, promoting accessibility and savvy shopping. High-end brands are encouraged to embrace this trend, recognizing the cultural shift towards valuing aesthetics and financial prudence.

=== Furniture ===
Knockoffs are pervasive in the furniture industry. In the United States, furniture designs can be protected by design patents that last for 15 years, but are typically not eligible for trademark protection as a functional product. In Europe, furniture designs are protected as intellectual property. Architectural Digest noted with the rise of e-commerce, "hundreds of home decor sites [sell] knockoff Eames, Kartell, and Le Corbusier models at IKEA prices." The Eames Lounge Chair has been cited as one of the most copied pieces of furniture. Its manufacturer, Herman Miller, launched a campaign warning customers about knockoff products in 1957.

== See also ==
- Mockbuster, a film created to exploit the publicity of another major motion picture with a similar title or subject
- Video game clone, a video game made to capitalize on a popular title
- Generic brand, similar quality products sold without brand name recognition
