= House of LaBeija =

Prominent drag family

The Royal House of LaBeija is the first house of Ballroom founded by Crystal LaBeija and Lottie LaBeija in 1968. It was the first ballroom house to host benefits to raise awareness during the 1980s HIV/AIDS epidemic. Crystal and Lottie established the House of LaBeija in response to the racially oppressive drag pageant system of 1960s America. In 1972, Crystal & Lottie LaBeija presented the 1st Annual "House of LaBeija Ball” at Up the Downstairs Case in Harlem, NY. This is thought to be the birth of house culture within the ballroom scene—as it is known today. Houses serve as alternative families, primarily for gay, gender nonconforming and transgender youth and others who feel ostracized from conventional support systems.

== House of LaBeija Film ==
On April 19, 2022, the Tribeca Film Festival announced that the House of LaBeija, a short film created by Fredgy Noël, would be featured at the festival. The film pays homage to the Royal House of LaBeija through a series of letters from its members. The film casts Vivian LaBeija, Samil LaBeija, Krystal LaBeija, Jasmine Rice LaBeija, Bougie LaBeija, Jeffrey Bryant, and Diovanna LaBeija.
