= Break My Soul =

2022 single by Beyoncé

- Updated digital cover

Single by Beyoncé

from the album Renaissance
- Released: June 20, 2022
- Studio: SING Mastering (Atlanta); The Juicy Juicy (Los Angeles); Parkwood West (Los Angeles); Henson Recording (Los Angeles); Avenue A West (Los Angeles); The Trailer (East Hampton, New York)
- Genre: House; dance-pop; diva house; dance
- Length: 4:38
- Label: Parkwood; Columbia
- Songwriters: Beyoncé; Terius Nash; Christopher Stewart; Shawn Carter; Freddie Ross; Adam Pigott; Allen George; Fred McFarlane
- Producers: Beyoncé; The-Dream; Tricky Stewart

Beyoncé singles chronology
| "Be Alive" (2021) | "Break My Soul" (2022) | "Make Me Say It Again, Girl" (2022) |

Madonna singles chronology
| "Frozen" (Remix) (2022) | "Break My Soul" (The Queens Remix) (2022) | "Back That Up to the Beat" (2022) |

Lyric video
- "Break My Soul" on YouTube

"Break My Soul" is a song by American singer Beyoncé. It was released on June 20, 2022, through Parkwood Entertainment and Columbia Records as the lead single from her seventh studio album, Renaissance (2022). The song was written by Beyoncé, Tricky Stewart, The-Dream, Jens Christian Isaksen, and her husband Jay-Z, and produced by the former four. It samples Big Freedia's 2014 bounce track "Explode", written by Freedia and Adam Pigott, and Robin S.'s house song "Show Me Love", written by Allen George and Fred McFarlane.

"Break My Soul" has been described as a dance-pop and house track. The song was met with critical acclaim upon release, with praise towards its production and lyrics. Its lyrical themes of personal empowerment in the face of unfulfilling jobs struck a chord with the masses during the epochal "Great Resignation". The song's impact on the public consciousness led to widespread recognition as the anthem of the movement, serving as a cultural symbol of the profound societal shift taking place.

"Break My Soul" topped the US Billboard Hot 100 and Hot Dance/Electronic Songs charts. It peaked at number six on the Billboard Global 200 chart, topped the chart in Ireland, and peaked within the top 10 of the charts in Australia, Canada, and the UK. The single has been certified diamond in Brazil and multi-platinum in Australia, Canada, and the US. At the 65th Annual Grammy Awards in 2023, "Break My Soul" won Best Dance/Electronic Recording and was nominated for Record of the Year and Song of the Year; the Terry Hunter remix was nominated for Best Remixed Recording.

== Background and release ==
In an interview with the British Vogue in June 2022, Beyoncé announced her upcoming seventh studio album Renaissance, the first part of a trilogy series, for release on July 29, and called it "her most ambitious musical project to date". The song title and its release date were revealed through the singer's social media bios on June 20, 2022; no further announcement was made. Several streaming services, including Spotify and Apple Music, immediately confirmed the news.

"Break My Soul" was revealed to be the title of the album's first single, via Beyoncé changing her Instagram bio to "6. BREAK MY SOUL midnight ET". Originally intended to be released at midnight Eastern Time on June 21 to coincide with the 2022 June solstice, the song was released to music streaming service Tidal and YouTube two hours prior, on June 20. "Break My Soul" marks Beyoncé's first single release from a solo studio album in six years.

Robin S. told British TV morning show Good Morning Britain that she only found out that "Show Me Love" had been sampled when her son called her to tell her that she was trending on Twitter. She told the hosts that she was grateful and open to collaborating with Beyoncé in the future. The sampling also led to the singer being inundated with requests from record labels, corporations and other artists to license the song's master recordings for various purposes. Robin S. further praised Beyoncé for acknowledging and appreciating her music, calling it "one of the highest compliments ever". American singer Crystal Waters, who helped make house music mainstream in the 1990s, stated she was "ecstatic" when she heard "Break My Soul", and expressed gratitude for Beyoncé for helping shine a light on underappreciated house singers.

== Composition ==
"Break My Soul" is a dance, dance-pop, house, and diva house song with influences of nu-disco and 1990s music rooted in Black and queer communities. Lyrically, the track sees Beyoncé "using her growliest voice to describe a search for liberation from a crushing job... and a nerve-jangling pandemic" and is "filled with dancefloor-friendly lines... and a repeated exhortation of 'Everybody'." In the chorus, "[t]he title is flipped" as Beyoncé sings "You won't break my soul". Fans and media outlets drew connections between lyrics like "Now I just fell in love / And I just quit my job" and the Great Resignation, a surge in Americans leaving their jobs due to wage stagnation and dissatisfaction with labor conditions. Glamour reported that some listeners had already quit their jobs due to these lyrics and expected others to follow suit.

"Break My Soul" prominently samples Big Freedia's 2014 bounce song "Explode" and takes heavy inspiration from Robin S.'s 1993 house-pop single "Show Me Love". According to Musicnotes.com, the song is performed in the key of G♯ minor with a tempo of 115 beats per minute in common time. Beyoncé's vocals span from F♯_{3} to D♯_{5} in the song.

== Critical reception ==
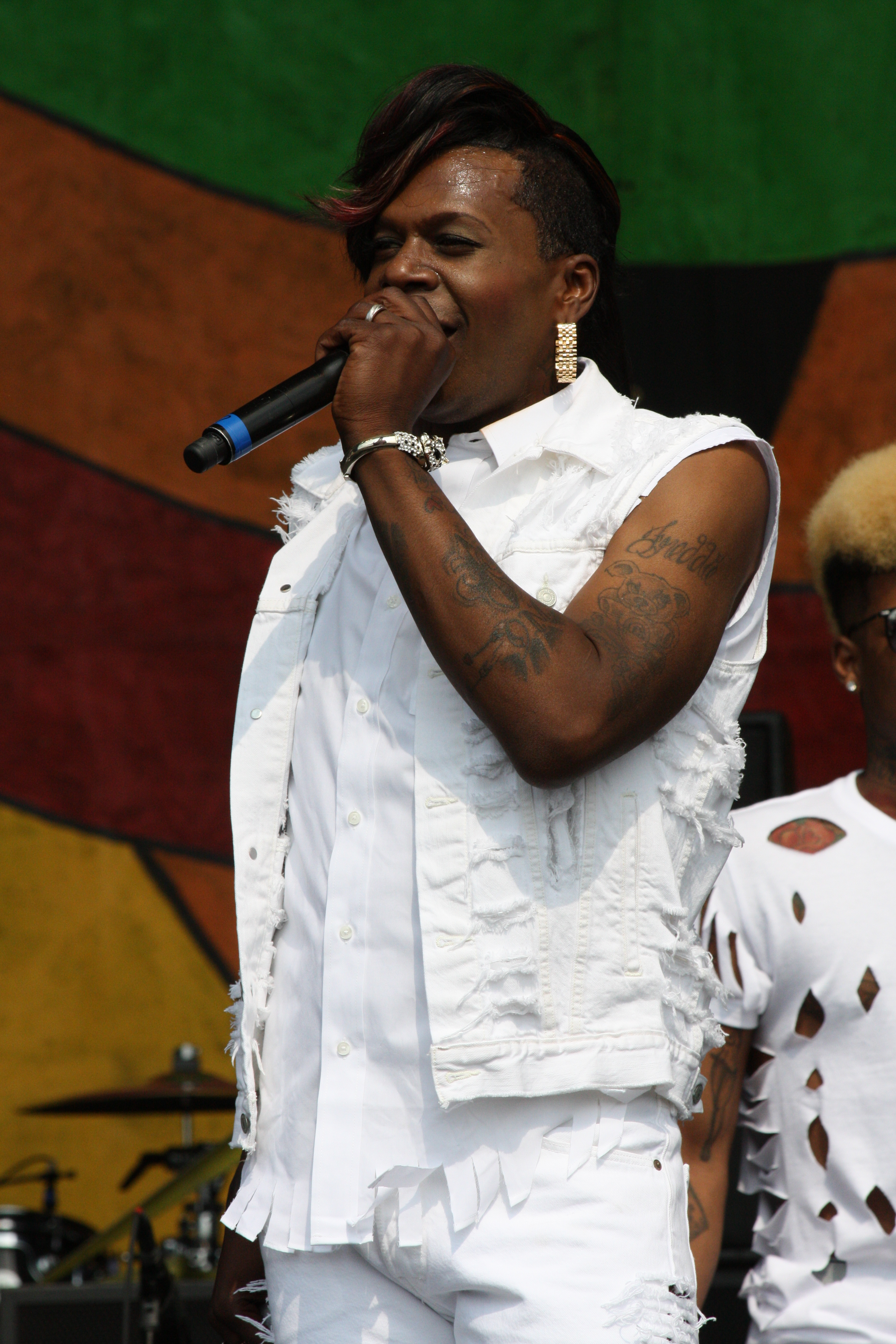
Big Freedia previously worked with Beyoncé on her 2016 single "Formation".

"Break My Soul" was met with widespread critical acclaim upon its release. In a five-star review for The i Paper, Lauren O'Neill described "Break My Soul" as a "floorfilling home run of a comeback" that makes you "give in to the impulses of your body and lose yourself in it". O'Neill praised Beyoncé for exploring new sounds on the track, while employing her impressive vocals and rapping skills "to offer something that feels completely new and still entirely her own". Kitty Empire described the song as an "instant classic" and an "ecstatic house music anthem of our times".

Variety's Jem Aswad described the song as highly anticipated by fans of Beyoncé, calling it "a driving dance track", before acknowledging the song's "plinking" and "insistent" hook. Julianne Escobedo Shepherd of Pitchfork called the track "dancefloor liberation" that features "Beyoncé as an SSRI, her attempt to assuage widespread depression and crushing stress." She goes on to highlight the song's position in a lineage of vocal house music and "Black queer tradition", calling it a "palimpsest [with] evocations and sounds layered deep in the sense memories of club heads." Writing for NME, Kyann-Sian Williams reported that "It's amazing to see a rise in black visibility in dance music" referring to Drake's Honestly, Nevermind alongside "Break My Soul". Williams finds some problems in the track, but nevertheless affirms that "singing over dance tracks is not easy, and only the best R&B stars can do so" in a song "sassy, full of pride; [...] It's more than a few tempo and melody issues, thanks to its beautiful message of confidence".

Writing for Billboard, Larisha Paul highlighted the song's "nearly five-minute run time in an algorithmic streaming age where even venturing beyond three minutes feels like a risk." Further, she praised the production for "allow[ing] the record to breathe, trading in rushed, overcrowded urgency for high energy, four-to-the-floor beats." Kyle Denis of the same publication praised Beyoncé for overcoming ageism in the music industry, writing that the elements of bounce and rap help the house track feel "fresh and uniquely Beyoncé." He further praised her for honoring dance music's Black and queer origins, building on her transformation into "one of the key sociopolitical artists of the past decade" that began with Lemonade (2016).

Rolling Stone placed the song at number 108 on its list of the 200 Greatest Dance Songs of All Time and at number 428 on their list of the 500 Greatest Songs of All Time. Billboard listed the song on its list of 50 Best Dance Songs of 2022.

Select year-end rankings of Break My Soul
| Publication | List | Rank | Ref. |
|---|---|---|---|
| Los Angeles Times | The 100 Best Songs of 2022 | 1 | |
| NME | Top 50 Best Songs of 2022 | 20 | |
| The Guardian | The 20 Best Songs of 2022 | 2 | |
| Billboard | The 100 Best Songs of 2022 | 2 | |
| Exclaim! | Exclaim!'s 25 Best Songs of 2022 | 3 | |
| Pitchfork | The 100 Best Songs of 2022 | 56 | |
| Rolling Stone | The 100 Best Songs of 2022 | 8 | |
| Slant | The 50 Best Songs of 2022 | 1 | |
| The Washington Post | Top 10 Singles of 2022 | 1 | |
| USA Today | Top 10 Best Songs of 2022 | 4 | |

== Awards and nominations ==
Award and nominations for "Break My Soul"
| Year | Ceremony | Award | Result | Ref. |
|---|---|---|---|---|
| 2022 | American Music Awards | Favorite R&B Song | Nominated | |
| 2022 | MTV Video Music Awards | Song of Summer | Nominated | |
| 2022 | Soul Train Music Awards | Song of the Year | Won | |
| 2022 | Soul Train Music Awards | The Ashford & Simpson Songwriter's Award | Nominated | |
| 2022 | People's Choice Awards | The Song of 2022 | Nominated | |
| 2022 | Capricho Awards | International Hit of the Year | Nominated | |
| 2023 | Grammy Awards | Record of the Year | Nominated | |
| 2023 | Grammy Awards | Song of the Year | Nominated | |
| 2023 | Grammy Awards | Best Dance/Electronic Recording | Won | |
| 2023 | Grammy Awards | Best Remixed Recording (Terry Hunter remix) (Note: This award is credited to the remixer, not its original producers.) | Nominated | |
| 2023 | ASCAP Pop Awards | Most Performed Songs | Won | |
| 2023 | ASCAP Rhythm & Soul | Most Performed R&B/Hip-Hop & Rap Songs | Won | |
| 2023 | Brit Awards | International Song of the Year | Won | |
| 2023 | BET Awards | BET Her Award | Won | |
| 2023 | BET Awards | Viewer's Choice | Won | |
| 2023 | BMI R&B/Hip-Hop Awards | Most Performed Songs of the Year | Won | |

== Commercial performance ==
=== North America ===
In the United States, "Break My Soul" debuted at number 15 on the Billboard Hot 100 with only three days of sales, becoming Beyoncé's 41st top 40 single as a solo artist and her highest debut since "Walk on Water" in 2017. The song also debuted atop the Digital Songs chart, becoming Beyoncé's tenth number-one. The following week, the song reached a new peak of number seven after a full tracking week, becoming Beyoncé's 20th top 10 single as a solo act and her 30th career top 10 single, which includes her group Destiny's Child. The song also became Beyoncé's first top 10 single in the United States since 2020's remix of "Savage" with Megan Thee Stallion and her first solo top 10 since 2016's "Formation". She joined Paul McCartney and Michael Jackson as the only artists in Hot 100 history to achieve at least 20 top-10s as a solo artist and 10 as a member of a group. "Break My Soul" also topped the Hot Dance/Electronic Songs chart, becoming Beyoncé's first number-one on this chart. For the week of July 31, the song reached a new peak of number six on the Hot 100 and spent its fifth week atop the Hot Dance/Electronic Songs chart. Following the release of Renaissance, "Break My Soul" ascended to the top of the Hot 100, becoming Beyoncé's eighth number-one single as a solo artist and her twelfth including Destiny's Child. The song was driven by 18.9 million streams, 13,000 downloads, and 61.7 million audience impressions for the week ending August 4, 2022. In doing so, Beyoncé holds the eighth-longest span between first and most recent number-one songs on the chart as a solo artist, with 19 years and one month since "Crazy in Love" featuring Jay-Z began its eight weeks at the summit on July 12, 2003. Additionally, it marked her first Hot 100 number-one as a solo artist since "Single Ladies (Put a Ring on It)" in 2008, nearly 14 years prior. This marked the charts' longest gap between solo number-one singles since Cher's "Believe" ascended to the top of the chart in March 1999, 25 years after "Dark Lady" in March 1974. The song topped the chart for two consecutive weeks. The song also topped the Hot R&B/Hip-Hop Songs, Hot R&B Songs, and logged a sixth week atop the Hot Dance/Electronic Songs chart, becoming the first song ever to top all four charts simultaneously.

The song debuted at number 10 on the R&B/Hip-Hop Airplay chart with 10.1 million audience impressions from six days of radio airplay. Upon doing so, "Break My Soul" became Beyoncé's 32nd top 10 hit on the R&B/Hip-Hop Airplay chart, tying R. Kelly and Usher for the sixth-most among all acts. Further, the song became only the ninth song ever and the first since Toni Braxton's "You're Makin' Me High" debuted at number nine in May 1996 to debut within the top 10 since the chart began in 1992. The song topped the chart for the week ending July 31, becoming Beyoncé's 9th number-one on the chart, tying her with Chris Brown for the third most number-one songs on the chart.

In Canada, "Break My Soul" debuted at number 29 for the week of July 2, 2022. The next week, it rose 21 positions to reach a new peak of number eight, becoming Beyoncé's ninth top 10 single in the country as a solo act. Following the release of Renaissance, the song reached a new peak of number four.

=== International ===
In the United Kingdom, the song debuted at number 21 on the UK Singles Chart on June 24, 2022, becoming Beyoncé's 36th top 40 song in Britain as a solo artist. The following week, the song climbed 17 positions to reach a new peak of number four, becoming Beyoncé's 20th top 10 single in the country as a solo act and her 33rd including those with Destiny's Child. Upon the release of Renaissance, "Break My Soul" rose four positions to reach a new peak of number two, held off the summit by LF System's "Afraid to Feel", and became Beyoncé's highest-peaking single in Britain as a solo artist since "If I Were a Boy" peaked at the top of the UK Singles Chart in November 2008.

In Ireland, the song debuted at number 18 on the Irish Singles Chart, becoming her 24th top 20 single in the country. The following week, the song reached a new peak of number two, becoming Beyoncé's first top 10 single in the country since 2017's "Walk on Water" with Eminem. Upon the release of Renaissance, "Break My Soul" rose two positions to number one, overtaking Kate Bush's "Running Up That Hill". The song became Beyoncé's fifth number-one single in the country as a solo act, and her first since 2010's "Telephone" with Lady Gaga.

In Australia, "Break My Soul" debuted at number 32 on the ARIA Singles Chart based on a partial week of sales for the week of June 24, 2022. Following the album's release, the song reached a new peak of number six, becoming Beyoncé's 23rd top 10 single in the country and the first since 2017.

== Live performances ==
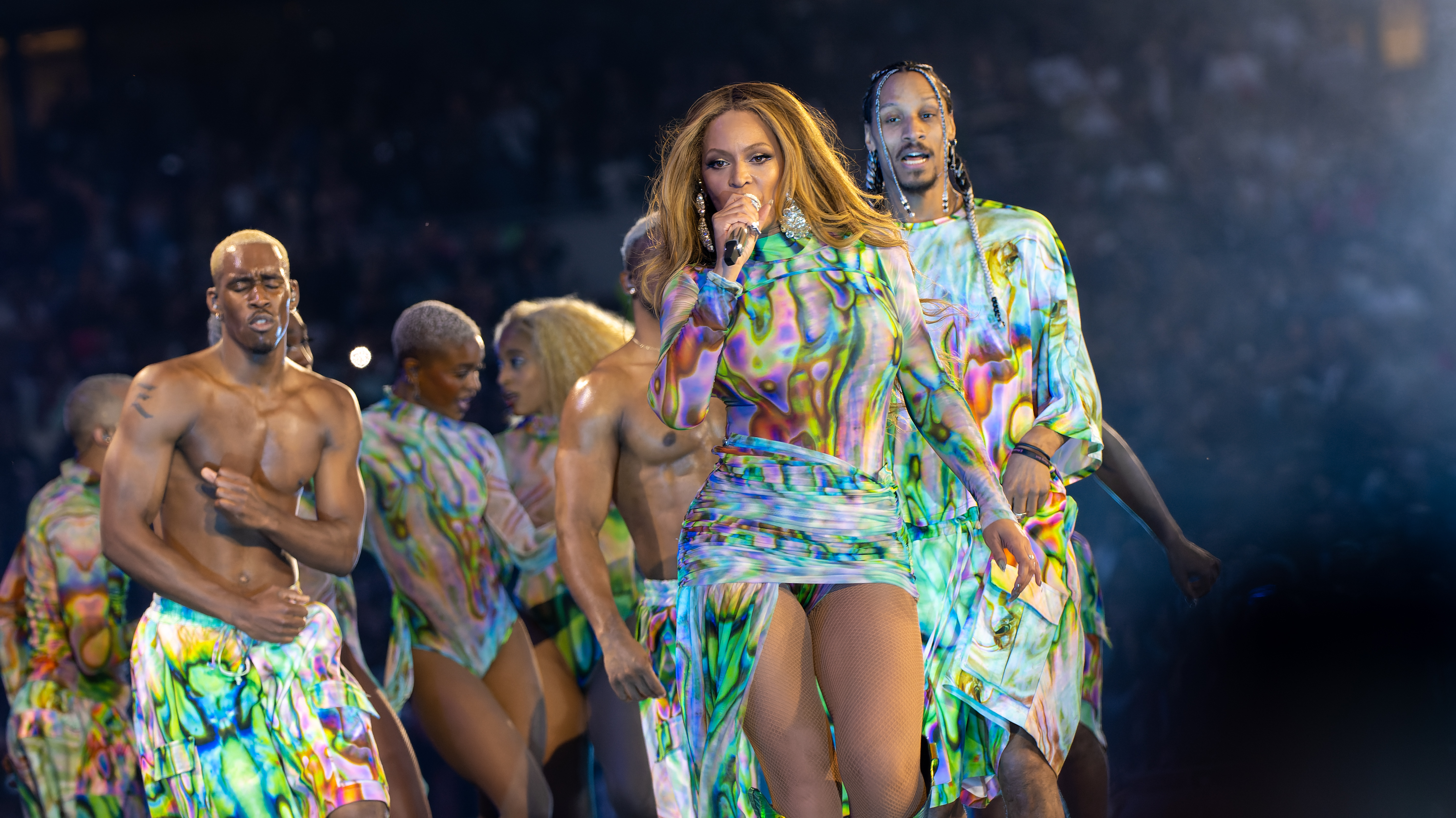
Beyoncé performing "Break My Soul" on the Renaissance World Tour in 2023

Beyoncé first performed "Break My Soul" at the Renaissance World Tour during the opening night in Stockholm, Sweden. The performance was preceded by "Energy", where it transitioned right into "Break My Soul", like on the album.

This performance takes place mainly on the secondary stage, with choreography such as voguing, and an inflatable disco ball-textured horse, like on the parent album's cover art, emerging out on the main stage. After the song's bridge, Beyoncé performs The Queens Remix version of the song. The remix is accompanied by a brief interpolation of The Jacksons' "Shake Your Body (Down to the Ground)" as the singer and dancers strut across the stage before returning to the remix. During most performances, Beyoncé and her dancers are wearing iridescent outfits designed by David Koma.

On December 25, 2024, "Break My Soul" was mixed into Beyoncé's performance of "Texas Hold 'Em" as the closing song of her 2024 NFL Halftime Show set list. "Break My Soul" was added to the set list of the Cowboy Carter Tour at the June 7 concert in London after "Energy".

== Remixes ==
On August 3, Beyoncé released an EP of four remixed versions of the track, produced by will.i.am, Terry Hunter, Honey Dijon, and Nita Aviance. Terry Hunter was nominated for Best Remixed Recording at the 65th Grammy Awards for his remix.

On August 5, Beyoncé released a remix exclusively through her online store, before releasing it to streaming services; "The Queens Remix" is a collaboration with Madonna, sampling and interpolating her 1990 song "Vogue". It features Beyoncé naming her sister Solange Knowles, her former Destiny's Child bandmates Kelly Rowland and Michelle Williams, and her musical protégés Chlöe and Halle Bailey, along with Madonna, Rosetta Tharpe, Santigold, Bessie Smith, Nina Simone, Betty Davis, Erykah Badu, Lauryn Hill, Lizzo, Roberta Flack, Toni Braxton, Janet Jackson, Tierra Whack, Missy Elliott, Diana Ross, Grace Jones, Aretha Franklin, Anita Baker, Sade, Jill Scott, Aaliyah, Alicia Keys, Whitney Houston, Rihanna and Nicki Minaj, before naming ballroom houses such as House of Xtravaganza, House of Aviance and House of LaBeija. Jon Caramanica from The New York Times called this remix, "electric, both philosophically and musically".

== Track listing and formats ==
1-track digital single

1. "Break My Soul" – 4:38

3-track digital single

1. "Break My Soul" – 4:38
2. "Break My Soul" (a cappella version) – 4:04
3. "Break My Soul" (instrumental version) – 4:35

Remixes EP

1. "Break My Soul" (will.i.am remix) – 3:58
2. "Break My Soul" (Terry Hunter remix) – 5:30
3. "Break My Soul" (Honey Dijon remix) – 6:27
4. "Break My Soul" (Nita Aviance club mix) – 9:54

The Queens Remix

1. "Break My Soul" (The Queens Remix; with Madonna) – 5:56

== Personnel and credits ==
=== Samples ===
- Contains elements of "Show Me Love", written by Allen George, and Fred Craig McFarlane and performed by Robin S.
- Contains a sample of "Explode", written by Adam James Piggott and Freddie Ross, performed by Big Freedia.
- "The Queens Remix" contains a sample of "Vogue", written by Madonna and Shep Pettibone, performed by Madonna.

=== Recording locations ===
- Avenue A Studio West (Los Angeles, California)
- Henson Recording Studios (Los Angeles, California)
- The Juicy Juicy (Los Angeles, California)
- Parkwood West (Los Angeles, California)
- SING Mastering (Atlanta, Georgia)
- The Trailer East Hampton (New York)

=== Personnel ===
Performers

- Vocals by Beyoncé
- Additional vocals by Big Freedia
- Background vocals by The Samples Choir:

- Erik Brooks
- Herman Bryant
- Porcha Clay
- Jonathan Coleman
- Caleb Curry
- Deanna Dixon
- Alexandria Griffin

- Naarai Jacobs
- Kim Johnson
- Kristen Lowe
- Jorel Quinn
- Chris McLaughlin
- Anthony McEastland
- Chelsea Miller

- Jamal Moore
- Jasmine Patton
- Javonte Pollard
- Fallynn Rian
- Ashley Washington
- Danie Withers
- Ashly Williams

Technical credits

- Beyoncé – production, vocal production
- Matheus Braz – assistant engineering
- John Cranfield – engineering
- Brandon Harding – recording
- Christian Isaksen – co-production
- Colin Leonard – mastering
- Chris McLaughlin – recording, backing vocals
- Andrea Roberts – engineering
- Tricky Stewart – production
- The-Dream – production
- Jason White – conductor
- Stuart White – mixing, recording

== Charts ==
=== Weekly charts ===
Weekly chart performance
| Chart (2022) | Peak position |
|---|---|
| Australia (ARIA) | 6 |
| Austria (Ö3 Austria Top 40) | 51 |
| Belgium (Ultratop 50 Flanders) | 12 |
| Belgium (Ultratop 50 Wallonia) | 14 |
| Brazil Airplay (Crowley Charts) | 82 |
| Bulgaria (PROPHON) | 9 |
| Canada Hot 100 (Billboard) | 4 |
| Canada AC (Billboard) | 19 |
| Canada CHR/Top 40 (Billboard) | 9 |
| Canada Hot AC (Billboard) | 17 |
| Croatia International Airplay (HRT) | 1 |
| Czech Republic Airplay (ČNS IFPI) | 56 |
| Czech Republic Singles Digital (ČNS IFPI) | 86 |
| Denmark (Tracklisten) | 33 |
| Finland Airplay (Radiosoittolista) | 31 |
| France (SNEP) | 18 |
| Germany (GfK) | 42 |
| Global 200 (Billboard) | 6 |
| Greece International (IFPI) | 8 |
| Hungary (Editors' Choice Top 40) | 15 |
| Hungary (Single Top 40) | 31 |
| Iceland (Tónlistinn) | 8 |
| Ireland (IRMA) | 1 |
| Israel (Media Forest) | 1 |
| Italy (FIMI) | 59 |
| Japan Hot Overseas (Billboard Japan) | 4 |
| Lebanon (Lebanese Top 20) | 1 |
| Lithuania (AGATA) | 14 |
| Luxembourg (Billboard) | 20 |
| Mexico (Billboard Mexican Airplay) | 31 |
| Netherlands (Dutch Top 40) | 29 |
| Netherlands (Single Top 100) | 14 |
| New Zealand (Recorded Music NZ) | 16 |
| Nigeria (TurnTable Top 100) | 25 |
| Panama (Monitor Latino) | 15 |
| Portugal (AFP) | 21 |
| San Marino (SMRRTV Top 50) | 2 |
| Slovakia Airplay (ČNS IFPI) | 42 |
| Slovakia Singles Digital (ČNS IFPI) | 33 |
| South Africa Streaming (TOSAC) | 4 |
| South Korea Download (Circle) | 119 |
| Spain (PROMUSICAE) | 94 |
| Sweden (Sverigetopplistan) | 30 |
| Switzerland (Schweizer Hitparade) | 15 |
| UK Singles (Official Charts) | 2 |
| UK Dance (Official Charts) | 2 |
| US Billboard Hot 100 | 1 |
| US Adult Pop Airplay (Billboard) | 11 |
| US Hot Dance/Electronic Songs (Billboard) | 1 |
| US Hot R&B/Hip-Hop Songs (Billboard) | 1 |
| US R&B/Hip-Hop Airplay (Billboard) | 1 |
| US Pop Airplay (Billboard) | 8 |
| US Rhythmic Airplay (Billboard) | 1 |
| Venezuela (Record Report) | 63 |

=== Year-end charts ===
2022 year-end chart performance for "Break My Soul"
| Chart (2022) | Position |
|---|---|
| Australia (ARIA) | 76 |
| Belgium (Ultratop 50 Flanders) | 76 |
| Belgium (Ultratop 50 Wallonia) | 84 |
| Canada (Canadian Hot 100) | 49 |
| Croatia (HRT) | 34 |
| Global 200 (Billboard) | 99 |
| Latvia (EHR) | 32 |
| UK Singles (OCC) | 38 |
| US Billboard Hot 100 | 38 |
| US Adult Top 40 (Billboard) | 42 |
| US Hot Dance/Electronic Songs (Billboard) | 2 |
| US Hot R&B/Hip-Hop Songs (Billboard) | 10 |
| US Mainstream Top 40 (Billboard) | 41 |
| US R&B/Hip-Hop Airplay (Billboard) | 14 |
| US Rhythmic (Billboard) | 15 |

2023 year-end chart performance for "Break My Soul"
| Chart (2023) | Position |
|---|---|
| US Hot Dance/Electronic Songs (Billboard) | 14 |

== Certifications ==
Certifications
| Region | Certification | Certified units/sales |
|---|---|---|
| Australia (ARIA) | 2× Platinum | 140,000^{‡} |
| Brazil (Pro-Música Brasil) | 2× Diamond | 320,000^{‡} |
| Canada (Music Canada) | 2× Platinum | 160,000^{‡} |
| Denmark (IFPI Danmark) | Gold | 45,000^{‡} |
| France (SNEP) | Platinum | 200,000^{‡} |
| Italy (FIMI) | Gold | 50,000^{‡} |
| New Zealand (RMNZ) | Platinum | 30,000^{‡} |
| Poland (ZPAV) | Gold | 25,000^{‡} |
| Portugal (AFP) | Gold | 5,000^{‡} |
| Spain (Promusicae) | Gold | 30,000^{‡} |
| Switzerland (IFPI Switzerland) | Platinum | 20,000^{‡} |
| United Kingdom (BPI) | Platinum | 600,000^{‡} |
| United States (RIAA) | 2× Platinum | 2,000,000^{‡} |
Streaming
| Sweden (GLF) | Gold | 4,000,000^{†} |
^{‡} Sales+streaming figures based on certification alone.^{†} Streaming-only figures based on certification alone.

== Release history ==
Release dates and formats
| Region | Date | Format(s) | Version | Label(s) | Ref. |
|---|---|---|---|---|---|
| Various | June 20, 2022 | Digital download; streaming | Original | Parkwood; Columbia | |
| Italy | June 24, 2022 | Radio airplay | Original | Sony Music | |
| United States | June 27, 2022 | AC radio; hot AC radio; modern AC radio | Original | Columbia | |
| United States | June 28, 2022 | Contemporary hit radio | Original | Columbia | |
| United States | June 28, 2022 | Rhythmic contemporary radio | Original | Columbia | |
| United States | June 28, 2022 | Urban AC radio; urban contemporary radio | Original | Columbia | |
| Various | July 22, 2022 | Digital download; streaming | 3-track | Parkwood; Columbia | |
| Various | August 3, 2022 | Digital download; streaming | Remixes EP | Parkwood; Columbia | |
| Various | August 5, 2022 | Digital download; streaming | The Queens Remix | Parkwood; Columbia | |
| Italy | August 24, 2022 | Radio airplay | The Queens Remix | Sony Music | |

== See also ==
- List of Billboard Hot 100 number ones of 2022
- List of Billboard number-one dance songs of 2022
