= Mother Juan Aviance =

American dancer (born 1963)

- Born: 1963 (age 62–63); Charleston, South Carolina, US
- Occupations: Secretary, voguer, dancer, musician, nightclub host/promoter and record label owner (CEO / A&R at Aviance Records, LLC)
- Years active: 1980s–present
- Known for: House of Aviance, vogue, nightclub host, Aviance Records, LLC (a record label) and ball culture
- Website: House of Aviance; Aviance Records, LLC

Mother Juan Aviance (born 1963 in Charleston, South Carolina) is an American secretary, voguer / dancer, music artist, nightclub host / promoter, record label owner, and CEO / A&R. He is the founder and "Mother" of the House of Aviance, one of the legendary houses that emerged from the U.S. ball culture in the 1980s, a House which is still active in New York City." He is also founder, CEO and A&R of Aviance Records, LLC, a multi-genre record label that promotes new and upcoming artists. He is regarded within the ballroom scene and is "House Mother" to the nightlife personalities and recording artists Kevin Aviance, and Erickatoure Aviance.

As an artist and host / promoter, Mother Juan has worked with several high-profile singers, music producers, DJs, and film directors over the years, some of which include Janet Jackson, Ce Ce Peniston, Madonna, Junior Vasquez, Tony Moran and Wolfgang Busch.

== Early life and education ==
Aviance was born in 1963 in Charleston, South Carolina and raised in Boston. From his school days up to his teenage years, he participated in performing arts activities such as dance and music but chose not to pursue a career in the performing arts because he disliked the repetitiveness of it, especially dance.

In 1982 he graduated from high school and progressed into business school to acquire office skills. Juan's background / schooling in business and dance is a key factor in the success of the House of Aviance, a vogue ball house which he would go on to create in 1989.

== Career ==
=== Outside ballroom culture ===
While at business school, Aviance worked for the Boston Public Schools as a clerk and then moved on to "The State of Massachusetts Disability" doing the same role.

In 1987, Aviance moved from Boston to Washington, DC and landed a job with an environmental lobbyist doing paralegal work and setting up press conferences with senators on Capitol Hill.

=== Within ball culture and the entertainment industry ===
In August 1989, Aviance founded the House of Aviance which is now one of the "legendary" ballroom houses to have emerged from African-American LGBT ball culture. The Legendary House of Aviance is known for its voguers, dancers, performances, runways, fashion, music, music producers and DJs, and "currently reigns the club scene in New York City." As of 2014, its membership is just over 700 worldwide and include dancers, musicians, DJs, drag queens, performing artists, visual artists, singers, songwriters, music producers and engineers. Since its founding, Aviance has been the "House Mother", and Daddy Tony Aviance the "House Father". According to Aviance, some of the key reasons for starting the House was because of his "love for the arts" and his leadership skills as stated below:

I started the House because of my love for the arts; and I have always been a leader–even as a kid, in dance troupes, singing groups, etc. Starting a House was just an extension of what I have always done since childhood.

— Mother Juan Aviance

Some notable House members include the nightlife personalities and entertainers Kevin Aviance ("oldest house daughter" or "first big daughter" of Mother Juan), and Erickatoure Aviance. DJs/Producers Jean-Philippe Aviance and Nita Aviance (a former dancer); and dancer Tamsier Joof Aviance.

As an artist and nightlife host/promoter, Aviance has gone on to work with several high-profile singers, music producers, DJs, and film directors over the years, some of which include Janet Jackson, Ce Ce Peniston, Madonna, Kevin Aviance, Bette Midler, Cyndi Lauper, Jennifer Hudson, Mariah Carey, Willi Ninja (the voguing icon and founder of the House of Ninja), Junior Vasquez, Tony Moran and Wolfgang Busch (director of the 2006 documentary How Do I Look).

==== As House Mother ====
My concern for the kids/members of the House far overshadows my desire for Ballroom fame
...
Some of the kids are fragile and want and need to be accepted and/or belong, but if they make one wrong move on the runway they are verbally abused and humiliated in front of their peers. In my opinion, I think people should be treated with more dignity and respect than what I've witnessed in the Ballroom. But make no mistakes I love the concept and despite all the things I find objectionable about the Ballroom I do remember where I came from.

— Mother Juan Aviance

Historically, the "Mother" of a ballroom house was usually a drag queen or a transgender woman. As such, Aviance was initially hesitant to assume the role of House Mother but ultimately decided to take up the role. His style of "mothering" is somewhat business-like, having attended business and dance school. Although this style is pivotal in the success of the House, he is also very protective towards his "house children", and was instrumental in removing the House of Aviance from walking balls to protect his children from what he deemed as "Ballroom politics", abuse, and unfair judging—despite the House winning numerous trophies and cash prizes over the years in ballroom competitions.

Aviance has also been instrumental and supportive in the professional careers of many of his children, some of which included the careers of Kevin Aviance, Erickatoure Aviance and DJ/Producer Jean-Philippe Aviance.

In the 1980s, Aviance spearheaded a weekly nightlife event in Washington, D.C. called Kindergarten Parties. These parties where frequented by New York City's Club Kids such as Amanda Lepore, James St. James and Kenny Kenny. Other patrons included Kevin Aviance (who later became a House Member) and several other nightlife personalities. These Kindergarten Parties propelled the careers of many high-profile artists within the LGBT community including Kevin Aviance and Jean-Philippe Aviance (the House of Aviance's first DJ) who used to DJ for Mother Juan at the former Vault Nightclub in D.C. where these weekly parties were held.

In January 2014, Aviance celebrated his 50th birthday with several House of Aviance DJs and House members in attendance. The event was hosted by Aviance's eldest daughter Kevin Aviance, with special guests including singer, DJ, fashion icon and former Deee-Lite vocalist Lady Miss Kier among other nightlife personalities.

Aviance is regarded as one of the living "legends / icons" within the ballroom scene with one of the longest continuously active ballroom houses that has won numerous competition cash prizes and trophies over the years. He is one of the longest serving and continuously active house parents in the history of ball culture having ruled the House for 33 years as of 2022, surpassing the record of the late icon Pepper LaBeija who ruled the Legendary House of LaBeija for nearly 32 years without interruption. On 23 March 2014, Aviance partnered with fellow House member David Ohana and founded Aviance Records – a multi-genre record label that promotes new and upcoming artists. Some high-profile House members and none-House members have released tracks through this record label including Erickatoure Aviance with her 2017 track OVAH—with the official video first showcased on Jonny McGovern's Hey Qween! Channel on 26 June 2017.

== See also ==
- LGBT culture in New York City
- List of LGBT people from New York City
