= Aviance =

Aviance

- Aviance (brand), a beauty brand produced by Unilever
- Aviance (horse), a racehorse
- Aviance UK, a defunct British aircraft ground handling agent
- House of Aviance, an American vogue-ball house
  - Aviance Records, their record label
