= Erickatoure Aviance =

American drag queen

- Education: Tisch School of the Arts
- Occupations: Nightlife personality; club host; clothing designer; fashionista; actor; drag performer; recording artist; dancer; singer; songwriter
- Years active: 2001–present
- Known for: Music, drag, dance and fashion

Erickatoure Aviance (or Ericka Toure Aviance) is an American nightlife personality, club host, clothing designer, fashionista, drag performer, recording artist, dancer, actor, singer, and songwriter. She is a member of the House of Aviance, one of the vogue and ballroom houses in the U.S., founded in 1989 by Mother Juan Aviance. It is from this House that she takes her last name from as customary for all ballroom house members.

== Early life and education ==
Aviance was born into a mixed race family with a Black father and a White mother. She grew up in Portsmouth, New Hampshire, and came out of the closet at a young age. Although a trained dancer, she started off doing theatre and didn't enter the dance field until she was 14 years of age. She attended New York University with a dance scholarship and in 1999, progressed to the Tisch School of the Arts and majored in dance.

== Career ==
During Aviance's career as a drag artist working in nightclubs, she met the entertainer Jonny McGovern who later became a friend and encouraged her to explore her drag character and make her own music. In her earlier years as an artist in New York City, she drew great influences from the performances of her fellow Aviance House member Kevin Aviance. As Erickatoure narrates in an interview with The Huffington Post:

Nightlife introduced me to the wonder of Kevin Aviance. His performances in my early years in NYC were extremely influential. I found him captivating, dynamic and inspiring. He was completely his own creation unlike anything I'd ever seen before. His command over an audience was enrapturing – his spiritual essence could envelope an entire room. The gravitas he had as a performer is always in the back of my mind when I create anything and every time I perform.

— Erickatoure Aviance,

In 2009, Aviance released her EP Work Ericka, and soon after released the music video for her single My Pumps collaborating with artist one-half NelSon who constructed all the looks in that video. Aviance also started the performance art group enSUBTITLES with one-half NelSon and Clifton Brown.

Aviance was part of La'Mady, a transgender rap group that included Koko Aviance, Linda James, and DJ Nita Aviance. The group collaborated with Jonny McGovern in his 2006 album Jonny McGovern Presents: This is NYC, Bitch! The East Village Mixtape , with Aviance featuring in the track Showgirl as well as on This is New York City (BITCH!). In that album, she also appeared with the La'Mady group on Runway in My Street Clothes. The track This is New York City (BITCH!) produced by Jonny McGovern, and written by Jonny McGovern, DJ Nita Aviance and Linda James also became a single for La'Mady and featured Kevin Aviance.

Aviance also Appeared on Jonny McGovern and Lady Red Couture's premiere Hey Qween TV's show Pimp My Drag! (a drag makeover show) in 2017 with Adam Joseph and one-half NelSon, and in 2016 and 2017 appeared on the Hey Qween Show as a guest, starring Jonny McGovern. The music video for her 2017 single OVAH released on Aviance Records was first published on Jonny McGovern and Lady Red Couture's Hey Qween YouTube channel on June 26, 2017.

== Controversy involving Wendy Williams ==
In 2009, Aviance was reported to have been kicked out of The Wendy Williams Show by Wendy Williams and her team for wearing a dress and a wig. It is alleged that: "Erickatoure Aviance was told she couldn't sit in the studio audience of The Wendy Williams Show because the show had a strict "no costume policy". Aviance responded to the incident by calling it "particularly offensive", and went on to add that "Williams has compared herself to a drag queen on the show multiple times." After receiving many complaints, and GLAAD getting involved, the show's officials issued an apology, changed their policy, and invited Aviance back on the show. In 2017, when Wendy Williams was supposed to do the pre-show for RuPaul's Drag Race, former contestant Detox, drag performer Stephanie Stone, and recording artist and RuPaul's Drag Race judge Michelle Visage took to social media and brought up the 2009 humiliation of Erickatoure on The Wendy Williams Show by referring to Wendy Williams as transphobic and not an ally of the LGBT community. That sentiment was echoed by RuPaul's Drag Race's All-Stars season 2 winner Alaska Thunderfuck who referred to Wendy William's coverage of Caitlyn Jenner's transition as "transphobic".

== See also ==
- Drag culture in New York City
- LGBTQ culture in New York City
- List of LGBTQ people in New York City
- NYC Drag March
- NYC Pride March
- Transgender culture in New York City
