= Jean-Philippe Aviance =

French American DJ

- Citizenship: French-American
- Occupations: House and techno DJ
- Years active: 1990-2014

Jean-Philippe Aviance is a French American house and techno DJ and producer from Washington, D.C. His career took off in 1990 when he started DJing for Mother Juan Aviance's voguing house (the House of Aviance) and weekly Kindergarten Parties at the Vault Nightclub in D.C. These weekly parties were frequented by U.S. nightlife personalities like Kevin Aviance (whom Jean-Philippe had worked with before back in the 1980s), New York City's Club kids such as Amanda Lepore, James St. James and Kenny Kenny. Jean-Philippe was the House of Aviance's first ever DJ.

The House of Aviance is one of the houses within the ball scene known for its vogueing, fashion, music and performances. He is a member of that House, and it is from that House where he takes his last name.

== Selection of works ==
In 1991, Aviance produced a track titled Go Bitch Go! – "Work This Pussy" (Original Bitch Mix). This track has been covered and released numerous times by some high-profile DJs such as Armand Van Helden in his 2014 Masterpiece. According to music critic Barry Walters, Britney Spears' 2013 track Work Bitch from her Britney Jean album is a recreation of "the vogueing vibe of gay/trans bitch tracks like Go Bitch Go's "(Work This) Pussy" [Go Bitch Go! – "Work This Pussy"] originally produced by Aviance in 1991. Critic Christina Lee posits that, Britney's Work Bitch track sounds more like RuPaul's 1993 track Supermodel (You Better Work). Aviance would go on to produce other classic house tracks such as Giv Me Luv - which was remixed in 2009 by DJs Chris Cox and Yiannis Mistress. Other works include Ultraworld – Life After Death on Strictly Rhythm (1991), Sexy Thing (1996) Useless (1999) and Black On Black (2001).

Throughout his career, Aviance has gone by several variations of his name including J. P. Aviance, J. P. Wilkerson, J. Philippe, J. Phillipe (Alcatraz), J. Phillippe, J. Phillippe Aviance, J.P., J.P. Aviance, J.Phillipe, Jean - Philippe, Jean Philip Aviance, Jean Philipe Aviance, Jean Philippe, Jean Philippe Aviance, Jean Philippe-Aviance, Jean Phillipe, Jean Phillipe Aviance, Jean Phillippe, Jean Phillippe Aviance, Jean-Philippe, Jean-Philippe Aviance, Jean-Philippe Avians, Jean-Phillipe, Jean-Phillippe, JP, and JP Avience.

== Alcatraz ==
Aviance was member of Alcatraz along with fellow U.S. producer/mixer Victor Imbres whom he collaborated with on Giv Me Luv (1995) - which reached number 12 in the UK Charts (1996).

Alcatraz was a duo consisting of Aviance and Imbres. The duo's debut single was Give Me Luv — which was released on Deep Dish's Yoshitoshi label in early 1995. This track was Aviance and Imbres' first collaboration. They had "first met when Imbres was engineering a remix of Deep Dish's Satori by Aviance." Alcatraz was not envisaged as a permanent collaboration. However, Aviance and Imbres' collaboration gained them journalistic and club support until the two parted company.

Aviance is married and lives in Delaware (as of 2014). He is currently a semi-retired DJ.
