= Kim Aviance =

American drag queen

Kim Aviance is a performance and visual drag artist, and nightclub hostess from the voguing and ballroom House of Aviance. She is a classically trained dancer and musician, and one of New York City's nightlife personalities. She is deemed a "New York nightlife queen", and has won numerous awards in the ball culture world. Aviance is a gender-non-conforming, and trans appearing.

Researcher madison moore explains Aviance's specialty: “Voguing, a dance form often tied to marginalized brown communities, and the runway, which is of course tied to high end commercialism and the sale of expensive commodities, is a ripe theoretical intersection. On the one hand, the movement on a ballroom floor is creative and is a means to its own end. Reputations are at stake, and it is important to give a good performance on the ball floor. But because the ball world is its own queer subcultural universe, balls have a means to their own end.”

In 2005 she was a featured dancer for Susanne Bartsh and Kenny Kenny's mega club in the Happy Valley venue. In 2006 she was featured at Larry Tee and Josh Wood’s club Bank at the newly renovated venue Element. One of her performances there was with performer Paul Alexander for his dance track “Walk for Me,” an “ode to the ballroom scene” where he sings “I want you to take to the catwalk, darling. You sure look gorgeous! Walk for body, walk for face. Walk it and snatch first place. Walk for me.” Aviance, on a treadmill, proceeded to vamp and vouge all while working the exercise machine like a fashion catwalk as if in a ball contest.

Kim performed at the Cock alongside Ari Gold during LGBTQ Pride week as a benefit for fellow House of Aviance member Kevin Aviance through the Anti-Violence Project; Kevin was assaulted in an anti-gay attack. In 2012 she hosted a weekly event, The Underground Tea Dance Party by Twitch Productions. In 2013 she was a host of Taylor Scott's The Underground Party at The Rosewood Club. In 2014 she performed at Click Friday's at BPM.
