= House Dance International =

Street dance festival in New York

House Dance International (“HDI”) is an annual street dance festival based in New York City that highlights the art forms of house dance, vogue, hustle, waacking and experimental, all of which are performed to house music or derivatives of electronic dance music. The three-day festival consists of a group choreography contest, freestyle competitions (i.e., "battles"), film screenings, seminars, workshops and parties. Established in 2007, HDI was the only event of its kind that exclusively focuses on the dance forms associated with house music culture (as compared to hip-hop dance forms such as b-boying, popping, locking, krumping, etc.).

== Mission ==
HDI represents a New York-based mission to bring together the various individuals and organizations that have played a role in the creation and development of house dance culture. Dating back to the 1970s in New York City and Chicago, the culture grew out of the clubs and social networks of the black and Latino gay community. Noteworthy clubs in Chicago included the Warehouse, Riviera, Music Box, and Medusa's. Landmark New York clubs where House dance developed included Paradise Garage, The Loft, and Sound Factory Bar.

With the invention of house music in 1983, house dance culture began to flourish in a cross-section of urban society, attracting dancers from all walks of life, ethnic backgrounds, socioeconomic classes and sexual orientations. The culture became a melting pot and repository for all types of dance styles: tap, jazz, modern, capoeira, salsa, b-boying, hip-hop that eventually morphed into its own distinctive style. The contribution of the various styles was fostered by the open-minded nature of the culture, which thrives on themes of liberation, unity and mutual passion for the music.

== Event History ==
The idea to host an annual NYC-based event dedicated to the various forms of house dance culture was conceived by Dancer, Santiago Freeman and Event Producer REDness Hayes in September 2006. They set out to produce the world's most comprehensive festival dedicated to the art form of dancing to house music. Enlisting the help of a variety of dancers and venues, HDI launched the in July 2007. HDI was held at Sullivan Room, Alvin Ailey Studios and Club Shelter. Judges in 2007 included Archie Burnett, Conrad Rochester, Junious Brickhouse, Marjory Smarth, and James “Cricket” Colter. The co-founders sought house dance pioneer Ejoe Wilson to be the Host / MC of the event.

== Attendees ==
The HDI event has been attended by thousands of dancers, DJs, house music enthusiasts and spectators from around the globe, including from South Africa, Japan, Korea, London, Paris, Sweden, Montreal, Belgium and Taiwan. Surveys conducted by the HDI organizers indicate that 25% of the attendees are from Japan, 23% from New York, 23% from out-of-state, 18% percent from Europe, and 6% from Canada, with the remaining 5% from other regions of Asia. As house dance culture begins to proliferate worldwide, attendance is expected to increase exponentially.

== Freestyle Competition Format ==
HDI features five specific categories of freestyle competitions: House dance, Vogue, Experimental, Hustle, and Waacking.

- House Dance (1x1): A dynamic urban dance performed to House Music that developed in the nightclubs of Chicago and New York over the last 25 years, the primary elements of House Dance consist of jacking, footwork and lofting with an emphasis on musicality and free spirit.
- Vogue (1x1): One of the most breathtaking art forms in urban dance, Vogue has experienced a vibrant history in the underground club scene and continues to amaze with innovation. Dancers exhibit skills in the old way, new way, vogue femme and dramatics.
- Experimental (1x1): A progressive urban dance performed to alternative genres of electronic dance music, including Nu Jazz, Broken Beat and Drum and Bass. Individual expression and abstract movement are the key components to this category.
- Hustle (2x2): Dating back to the 1970s Disco Era, the Hustle is house dance culture's time-honored partner dance that consists of the romantic interchange between two free and elegant souls.
- Waacking (1x1): A fierce upright style that developed on the West Coast during the Soul Train years, Waacking is an electrifying art form of complex arm and hand movements that project sensuality and strength from the legs. It demonstrates the movements in the legs.
- House Dance Group Battle (5x5): Groups of up to 5 contestants compete as a unit and incorporate various genres of House Dance into their movement with an emphasis on musicality and free spirit. Groups are scored on a mathematical scale by a panel of judges using the following criteria: (1) musicality / rhythm; (2) vocabulary; (3) originality / creativity; (4) charisma; (5) staging / blocking; (6) costume design.

All contestants must qualify for final rounds by auditioning at preliminary rounds. Each contestant receives approx. 2 minutes to dance in a solo exhibition to music selected by the DJ. A panel of judges scores each contestant on the basis of four criteria: (1) musicality/rhythm; (2) technique/vocabulary; (3) charisma/free spirit and (4). The top contestants with the highest mathematical scores in each category advance to the final rounds.

== Group Choreography Contest ==
In addition to the freestyle competitions, HDI also hosted a group choreography contest that showcased the talents of groups within the house dance community. The Group Choreography Contest has now been replaced with the House 5x5 Group Battle Competition.

== Workshops ==
HDI hosts its entire event exclusively at Jamaica Performing Arts Center in Jamaica, NY.

HDI instructors have included Brian “Footwork” Greene, Ejoe Wilson, Marjory Smarth, Archie Burnett, Akim Funk Buddha, Tyrone Proctor, Sergia Anderson, David Padilla, FootworKingz, Yugson, Aus Ninja, Cesar Valentino, and Kim D. Holmes.

== Film Screenings ==
Consistent with its theme of advancing House Dance culture, HDI has screened various films that address the subject matter of House Dance. Past films screenings have included:

- Check Your Body at the Door: Dr. Sally Sommer, Professor of Dance at Florida State University, presented her remarkable documentary film that explores the movement vocabulary of legendary NYC house dancers, including Archie Burnett, Willi Ninja, Ejoe Wilson, Marjory Smarth and Conrad Rochester. Made possible in part by contributions from the National Endowment of the Arts, Dr. Somner interviews dancers from the local NYC scene and captures now-vintage footage from the late 80s and early 90s. Check Your Body at the Door now stands as an historical document and testament to the early years of NYC's house dance culture.
- How Do I Look: Directed by Wolfgang Busch, How Do I Look is the follow-up the international breakthrough film Paris is Burning. The film documents New York's underground ballroom community from 1997 through 2004 and features some of the most respected dancers in the world of Vogue.
- Dance For Peace: A non-profit organization dedicated to working with underprivileged youth from developing countries, Dance For Peace director Kumari Singh presented a short documentary in 2008 chronicling the impact that urban dance has had on the youth in South Africa.
- HDI DVD Highlights: In 2008, film producers Santiago Freeman and Christopher Scott presented 2007 highlights from the various competition categories.

== Host / MC ==
HDI is hosted by Jamal "Nemesis" Warren. Nemesis is a professional dancer. As a dancer and producer of events such as Chicken and Beer, More than Enough NYC and UDEF Tour, Nemesis has established a presence in the Urban Dance Community. His heavy involvement in domestic and international Dance Community functions and competitions alike makes him a notable character in today's dance scene.

== Organizers ==
- Conrad Rochester (Creator / Executive Director). Conrad has been a Dancer for more than thirty-five years, growing up on the Lower East Side of Manhattan in the early 1970s. As the multicultural neighborhood began bubbling with individuals that are now considered legends, Conrad was engulfed by the energy of music, dance and art of this era. By the age of 17, he was already accepted and known as a member of the Loft and Paradise Garage Movements. Conrad has worked with any and everyone that is considered relevant in the underground House Scene. Currently, and in addition to HDI, Conrad is preparing for his annual sister event in the Dominican Republic called Vibrant Flow Escape. He also hosts a monthly party called Hangtime and maintains domestic workshops under The Loft Practice.
- Brahms 'Bravo' LaFortune (co-producer). Haitian-born Brahms “Bravo” LaFortune, grew up in Brooklyn. He gravitated to dance, music and martial arts at a very early age. Self-taught, he studied TV movie re-runs of Fred Astaire, Gene Kelly, Nicholas Brothers, and Sammy Davis Jr. Clubbing by 14 years old, Bravo hit all the mainstream clubs in the late 1970s and early ‘80s (Studio 54, Bonds International, Melons, Kilimanjaro, The Loft and Paradise Garage among others). LaFortune is also an architect, music producer and occasional DJ. He acts as on-site DJ and co-teacher with Archie Burnett at NYC’s Peridance. He has toured worldwide and has performed at NYC dance venues such as Dance Theater Workshop, Joe’s Pub, the Guggenheim Museum, PS122, working with choreographer David Neumann and Doug Elkins. LaFortune was also an actor/dancer in XTRAVAGANZA a 6-month international touring production of theater company, “The Builders Association.” Most recently he appeared in the documentary "Check your Body at the Door."

== DJs ==
House Dance International has featured some of the world's most prestigious house music DJs including DJ Spinna, the Martinez Brothers, Quentin Harris, Filsonik, DJ Sabine, Brian Coxx, Chip-Chop Ninja, Pang-Lo, Don Barbarino (Oasis, Montreal), Pat Boogie (Oasis, Montreal), Crash (Düsseldorf), DJ G Do Brazil and Liquid Agents.

== World Championship Results ==
- 2007:

House Dance (Shuho Chiba) Vogue (Javier Ninja) Hustle (Sergia Anderson & Raul Santiago) Experimental (Future)

- 2008:

House Dance (Shuho Chiba) Vogue (Javier Ninja) Hustle (Sergia Anderson & Raul Santiago) Experimental (Future) Waacking (Aus Ninja)

- 2009:

House Dance (Cebo) Vogue (Javier Ninja / Dashaun Simmons) Hustle (Sergia Anderson & Raul Santiago) Experimental (Erika Jimbo)

- 2010:

Experimental (Future)

== Judges ==
- 2007: Conrad Rochester (House Dance); Junious Brickhouse (House Dance); James "Cricket" Colter (Experimental); Archie Burnett (Vogue); Marjory Smarth (Hustle).
- 2008: Hector Xtravaganza (Vogue); Akim Funk Buddha (Experimental); Voodoo Ray (House); David Husney (Hustle); Tyrone Proctor (Waacking).
- 2009: Dray Ebony (Vogue); Evelyn Santos (Experimental); Chino 3 (House); David Padilla (Hustle); Tyrone Proctor (Waacking).
- 2010: Cesar Valentino (Vogue); Evelyn Santos (Experimental); Yugson (House); Desiree Faltine (House); Tyrone Proctor (Waacking).
- 2013: Cesar Valentino (Vogue); Kim D. Holmes (House); Archie Burnett (Waacking).

== Notes ==
1. See Selah, Makkada B., “Powder Burns: House Dancing Finally Gets Its Day (Four, Actually) in New York City”, Village Voice, June 26, 2007. http://www.villagevoice.com/2007-06-26/music/powder-burns/

3. In European countries and Asia, House Dance was introduced by a series of New York-based dancers who had gravitated to house dance from hip-hop culture in the early 1990s. As a result, house dance has been viewed as an extension or derivative of hip-hop culture when it in fact developed on its own trajectory in nightclubs throughout the 1980s, independent of what was happening in hip-hop culture. See Reeves, Marcus, “Celebrating an Unsung Body Revolution”, New York Press, July 5, 2007. http://www.nypress.com/20/28/abouttown/about2.cfm.

4. See Sagolla, Lisa Jo, “Breaking into House”, Backstage, November 16, 2007. http://www.backstage.com/bso/advice-columns/actors-craft/voice-movement/article_display.jsp?vnu_content_id=1003673874
