= Javier Ninja =

American vogue dancer and teacher (born 1984)

- Born: Javier Madrid; 10 March 1984 (age 41); Queens (New York City), United States
- Occupation(s): Vogue dancer and teacher
- Known for: Voguing

Javier Ninja (birth name Javier Madrid, born 10 March 1984 in Queens (New York City)) is an American vogue dancer and teacher. Madrid is a member of the Legendary House of Ninja founded by the late Willi Ninja and has worn the House Dance International vogue "Champion of the year" for three consecutive years. He is well known within the vogue dance world and has performed and taught in several countries including the U.S.

== Early life and education ==
Madrid was born in Queens, New York City. He attended "The New Ballet School" (a tuition free ballet school for children from low income families, now called Ballet Tech founded by Eliot Feld) when he was nine years old and studied contemporary, modern and ballet, and discovered vogue when he was fifteen years old (in a nightclub).

Like many underground voguers of his generation and the generation before him, he started going to nightclubs whilst he was underage. He met the great Willi Ninja in 2002 who went on to become his mentor. Willi coached and guided him for five years until he was ready to "walk" a ball.

== Career ==
Madrid won the House Dance International's vogue "Champion of the year" three years in a row (2007, 2008 and 2009) and has become a permanent fixture of the ball scene since 2007 — entering many competition and judging. He is a member of the Legendary House of Ninja, a vogue house founded by the late Willi Ninja — his mentor, and the person who brought him to the House. Madrid has performed solo pieces as well as group pieces with other members of the House in various countries as well as in the U.S.

He performed in "Battle of Yestermorrow" by Iona Rozeal Brown (2011), "Scott, Queen of Marys" - previously performed by his late mentor the great Willi Ninja ("the godfather of voguing") in 1994, "Off Broadway" House of Ninja Production and "East is Red".

Television appearances include America's Next Top Model presented by Tyra Banks and his "House father" Benny Ninja. In 2010, Madrid performed in the World competition "Juste DeBout" in Paris. He has performed with Madonna in the 2012 Super Bowl, appeared in Icona Pop's music video "All Night" (2013) and in FKA twigs music video "Glass & Patron" (2015) starring alongside Benjamin Milan, Tamsier Joof Aviance and David Magnifique — the three voguers from London (England).

Madrid also appeared in the flagging documentary "Flow Affair" directed by Wolfgang Busch. As well as being a dancer, Madrid is also a vogue dance teacher and has taught in the US and various other countries especially in Europe and the Far East. He is a guest teacher at the Broadway Dance Center in New York City and as of 2013, is the current "father" of the Legendary House of Ninja following Benny's involvement in the December 1, 2013 Metro-North train derailment.
