= Ekaj =

- Theatrical release poster
- Directed by: Cati Gonzalez
- Written by: Cati Gonzalez
- Produced by: Michael Gonzalez; Cati Gonzalez
- Starring: Jake Mestre; Badd Idea; Scooter LaForge
- Cinematography: Cati Gonzalez
- Edited by: Michael Gonzalez
- Music by: Paul "Pistachio" Vega
- Production company: Tompkins Square Park Films
- Distributed by: Indie Rights
- Release date: November 11, 2015
- Running time: 79 minutes
- Country: United States

Ekaj is a 2015 American independent drama film written and directed by Cati Gonzalez, starring Jake Mestre, Badd Idea, and Scooter LaForge. The film made its New York City premiere at the 5th Annual International Puerto Rican Heritage Film Festival.

Gonzalez intended for Ekaj to be a work in the vein of Midnight Cowboy, but with a focus on New York's Puerto Rican drifters. The film screened at several Film Festivals which include, LesGaiCineMad, Palm Beach International Film Festival, Q Fest St. Louis / St. Louis International Film Festival, QCinema Fort Worth, Downtown Urban Arts Festival, NewFilmmakers NY, SF Latino Film Festival Cine+Mas, International Film Festival, Idyllwild International Festival of Cinema, Macabre Faire Film Festival, Human Rights Film Festival Barcelona and other festivals worldwide.

== Plot ==
Ekaj is a naïve runaway teen who tries to survive in New York City. He meets "Mecca" (Badd Idea), a cynical artist and hustler who takes Ekaj under his care. Mecca stays at his cousins place and we get glimpses of the fact that he has AIDS, since he has tattoos with the word written on his body. He drinks all day but still manages to be sane and sharp. He's also an opportunistic thief. Ekaj decides to go into prostitution out of desperation. Mecca becomes ill, as his medication does not really seem to be working for him. At the same time we see Ekaj becoming stronger and less vulnerable. He ends up falling in love with a painter named "Johnny" (Scooter LaForge) who has no tolerance and is constantly beating him. Johnny seems indifferent and cold towards Ekaj's desperate love and obsession for him. With no place to really sleep, Ekaj stays during the day with Mecca at his cousin's place, at Johnny's place, or at times staying in hotel rooms paid by coins (clients). Their relationship develops into true love and care for each other.

== Cast ==
- Jake Mestre
- Badd Idea
- Scooter LaForge
- Vinny Cruz
- Mario Piantini
- Carlos Anaya
- Prince Franco
- Joey Lopez
- Johnny King
- Maximilian France
- William Lynn
- Nita Aviance
- Clifton Brown Jr.
- Gage of the Boone
- Rashid Henderson
- Superok Gachineiro
- Giovanie Paz

== Reception ==
The film had a very successful Film Festival run in the year 2016. It won its first award for "Best Film" at the 2016 NY Downtown Urban Arts Festival in Tribeca, New York City, where it was well received by a sold-out audience. Ekaj ended up becoming a hit at festivals and continued to screen worldwide from the years 2017, 2018 until early January 2019 when it had its most recent screening at the Dona i Cinema (Women in Film) Festival in Valencia, Spain. The overall response to the film since being released online via Video on Demand by distributor Indie Rights has been largely positive.

Ekaj currently holds a 100% critic approval rating on the online review aggregator Rotten Tomatoes based on 16 reviews.

=== Accolades ===
- 2016 NY Downtown Urban Arts Film Festival – Best Film
- 2016 Philadelphia Independent Film Festival – Best Film, Best New-Director, Best Actor
- 2016 Pembroke Taparelli Arts and Film Festival – Best Film
- 2016 QCinema Fort Worth Film Festival – Best First Film
- 2016 I Filmmaker International Film Festival, Spain – Special Mention
- 2017 Macabre Faire Film Festival – Best Director
- 2017 Idyllwild International Festival of Cinema – Best Cinematography
- 2017 Trans* Film Festival Kiel, Germany – Best Film, Best Actor, Best Music Soundtrack
- 2017 Premios Latino, Spain – Best Film, Best Cinematography
- 2017 Boom Film Awards, USA – Best Film, Best Supporting Actor
- 2017 Festival de Cine de Marbella, Spain – Best Film (Blogos de Oro Critics Award), Best Director
- 2017 Nuevo Cine Andaluz de Casares, Spain – Best Director
- 2017 Mediterranean Film Festival Cannes, France – Special Mention
- 2017 Amarcord Chicago Arthouse & TV Video Awards, USA – Best Screenplay
- 2018 Ibiza Cine Fest, Spain – Best Film
- 2018 Global Motion Picture Awards, USA – Best Film, Best Editing
- 2018 Sicily International Film Festival, Italy – Best Film
- 2018 Hudson Yard Film Festival, USA – Best Film, Best Director
- 2016 Newark International Film Festival, USA – Best Director, Best Actor – Nominated
- 2016 International Film Festival Manhattan, USA – Best Actor – Nominated
- 2016 Chicago BLOW-UP ArtHouse Film Festival, USA – Best Film – Nominated
- 2017 Macabre Faire Film Festival, USA – Nominations (5)
- 2016 I Filmmaker International Film Festival, Spain – Best Film – Nominated
- 2017 2017 Idyllwild International Festival of Cinema – Nominated (7)
- 2017 Trans* Film Festival Kiel, Germany – Best Song, Best Poster – Nominated
- 2017 Alternative Film Festival, Toronto, Canada – Best Poster – Nominated
