= Nita Aviance =

American dancer & musician (born 1980)

- Born: 1980 (age 45–46)
- Origin: Rochester, New York, United States
- Genres: House, Dance, Electronic and Soul
- Occupations: dancer, percussionist, jazz singer, DJ, music producer and actor
- Years active: 1990s–present
- Label: Batty Bass

DJ Nita (born 1980) known as Nita Aviance is a dancer, percussionist, jazz singer, DJ, music producer, actor, and a member of The Carry Nation along with fellow DJ/producer Will Automagic. Nita is also half of two other production teams, BOOKWRMZ and Brooklyn Is Burning, as well as a member of the production team Pyramide.

In the late 1990s, Nita left Rochester for New York City where she joined the legendary House of Aviance, "one of the major houses in the city's ballroom and vogue scene." Nita is one of the prominent DJ/producers of New York City's LGBT nightlife and has worked in various cities around the world as a DJ including London, UK where her record label is based.

Nita has logged remixes for various artists including Beyoncé, the Scissor Sisters, Le1f, Will Automagic, and Adam Joseph. According to Mix Magazine, Nita and Will Automagic are regarded as "veterans of the ever ebbing and flowing New York nightlife scene, having begun working together after being introduced to one another by fellow DJ Michael Formika Jones in the early 2000s."

== Early life and education ==
Nita was born and grew up in Rochester, New York, which she left for New York City to pursue her education. She attended New York University, and whilst in New York City, joined the legendary House of Aviance as a dancer/drag artist in the 1990s. Having made a name for herself with one of the most prominent ballroom and voguing houses of New York, she turned to full-time DJing. She took her name Aviance from the House of Aviance—as is common with all house members within the ballroom community.

Nita is a trained percussionist, jazz singer, and dancer.

== Career ==
Nita started her professional DJ career in the early 2000s. In 2003, she met Will Automagic (née William Lynn) at the Opaline Area 10009, a nightclub on Avenue A in the East Village of New York City which is now defunct, through fellow DJ and drag artist Mistress Formika (DJ Michael Formika Jones). The duo started asking each other to guest-DJ gigs, and in 2012, Nita suggested to Automagic that they make a record together. Their collaboration led to the creation of The Carry Nation and the release of the "percolating dance track" This Bitch Is Alive, which led to a record deal with Batty Bass, a label based in London, United Kingdom.

Since joining the House of Aviance, Nita has both worked solo and as one half of The Carry Nation. Some of her other classic tracks include The Queens, a remix of XiViX's Urgent, as well logging remixes for various other artists including Beyoncé, the Scissor Sisters, Le1f, Will Automagic, and Adam Joseph.

Nita's sound helped transform the East Village's Opaline Area 10009 into the ultimate dance party of the early 2000s. It was during the Opaline days when Aviance along with DJ Sammy Jo (the Scissor Sisters official tour DJ) formed the Downtown DJ Coalition as a musical alternative to the mega-clubs. In late 2006, Aviance and Gant Johnson founded their weekly party Tubway at New York City's underground dance den, mr.Black. From a small soulful, living-room-style party, Tubway evolved "into the most raucous Saturday night cross-section of New York nightlife." Her residency at Tubway brought praise from nightlife personalities and brought in guest appearances from renowned international DJs like Tom Stephan, AC Slater, Junior Vasquez and the UK's Horse Meat Disco. Aviance is a four-time Glammy Awards winner for Best DJ (the award for nightlife personalities in New York City), and Tubway was voted by Paper Magazine as the best party in 2008. As of 2020, Nita holds a residency at the award-winning WESTGAY.

Nita was part of La'Mady, a transgender rap group that included Linda James and fellow House of Aviance members, Erickatoure Aviance and Koko Aviance. The group collaborated with Jonny McGovern in his 2006 album Jonny McGovern Presents: This is NYC, Bitch! The East Village Mixtape.

Nita Aviance also appeared in the 2015 American independent drama film Ekaj (as club DJ), written and directed by Cati Gonzalez. She also appeared in the 2020 documentary Filterswept (as self), written and directed by Rosa Costanza.
