= Aviance Records =

American independent record label

- Parent company: House of Aviance
- Founded: 2014
- Founder: Mother Juan Aviance and David Ohana Aviance
- Genre: Various
- Country of origin: U.S.
- Location: New York City
- Official website: www.aviancerecords.com

Aviance Records is an independent record label company founded in March 2014 by New York City's nightlife personality and vogue dancer Mother Juan Aviance with business partner DJ/Producer David Ohana Aviance.

Aviance Records is a multi-genre record label company that promotes new and upcoming artists. It is a division of the House of Aviance brand—one of the legendary ballroom houses in the U.S. The company is headed by Mother Juan Aviance (CEO / A&R) and David Ohana Aviance (CEO / Producer).

The first record released on this label was a house track titled Avi’ously Aviance (2014), produced by David Ohana Aviance and featuring EJ Aviance, Kevin Aviance, Perry Aviance and Mother Juan Aviance. Since then, it has gone on to release other tracks such as Discotech (produced by dEEcEE); Who You Are (produced by Ohana and Morabito); Circles (by Rob Moore), the soulful track They Don't See — a collaboration between producer/remixer Call Me Cleve (Cleveland Allen) and vocalist Zhana Roiya; Take Control by Shanee; OVAH by Erickatoure Aviance — produced Adam Joseph; and Vogue Is My Religion by Coby Koehl – mixes by Adam Joseph and David Ohana Aviance.

== Discography ==
Year	Information
2014	Avi'ously Aviance feat. EJ Aviance, Kevin Aviance, Perry Aviance and Mother Juan Aviance; produced by David Ohana Aviance: Released: December 25, 2014
2015	Discotech – produced by DJ dEEcEE: Released: October 9, 2015
2016	Who You Are – feat. Johanna; produced by Morabito and David Ohana Aviance: Released: February 26, 2016
2016	Circles – produced by DJ Rob Moore; dub mix by David Ohana Aviance: Released: April 15, 2016
2016	They Don't See – by Zhana Roiya; produced by Call Me Cleve: Released: July 22, 2016
2016	Take Control – by Shanee; original & dub mix produced and mixed by Gilad Markovich; club mix, 10am mix & instrumental remixed by DJ/Producer David Ohana Aviance: Released: December 9, 2016
2017	OVAH – by Erickatoure Aviance; original/extended mix by Adam Joseph; remixed by David Ohana Aviance: Released: June 23, 2017
2017	Vogue Is My Religion – by Coby Koehl; mixes by Adam Joseph and David Ohana Aviance: Released: November 24, 2017

== See also ==
- List of record labels
