= Tamsier Joof Aviance =

Senegalese and Gambian dancer, model, and actor

- Born: Tamsier Joof; 17 May 1973 (age 53); Kensal Rise, London, England
- Education: London Studio Centre; Middlesex University; University of Wolverhampton
- Occupations: Dancer, choreographer, actor, model, entrepreneur, Radio presenter and author
- Years active: 1989–present (on-and-off)
- Known for: dance, radio personality
- Parent: Bai Modi Joof
- Relatives: Alieu Ebrima Cham Joof (uncle); Pap Cheyassin Secka (cousin); Bai Konte (great-uncle); other relatives: Joof family
- Website: Seereer Heritage

Tamsier Joof Aviance or Tamsier Aviance (né Tamsier Joof; born 17 May 1973,), formerly known by the stage name Tam Jo, is a British dancer, choreographer, actor, model, entrepreneur, radio presenter, and author. He took the name "Aviance" after joining the House of Aviance, one of the legendary vogue-ball houses in the United States. As well as appearing in several musicals, and as stage backing dancer for Mary Kiani, Take That and Janet Jackson, he was also known within the London voguing scene during the 1990s and is among the original London vogue dancers of that era.

== Early life and education ==
Tamsier was born in North West London (Kensal Rise) into a Senegalese-Gambian family. His late father was a Gambian barrister and solicitor, and his mother a business woman. Tamsier left the UK when he was two years old after his father decided to move his family back to the Gambia and establish his chambers there. He returned to the UK couple of years later to pursue his education. In an interview with West Africa magazine, Tamsier said:

Coming from an African family where education is everything, I felt I needed to please both my parents and myself. I love dance and hated accounting, but accounting provided respectability in African circles so I studied both.

—

Tamsier studied classical ballet, jazz, African, contemporary, Latin, tap and labanotation. He attended Middlesex University, the University of Wolverhampton and the London Studio Centre and holds an Accounting and Finance Honours Degree, a PGCE and a Performing Arts Dance Degree. As of 2006, he was a non-active qualified teacher and an Associate of the Imperial Society of Teachers of Dancing and the International Dance Teachers Association. Tamsier also took additional classes at London's Pineapple Dance Studios and Danceworks in various dance styles such as breaking; commercial jazz with the late Nicky Bentley (one of the earlier dance teachers at Pineapple Dance Studios) and with choreographer Shanie, whom he describes as influencing his commercial funk and jazz style. He also studied popping and street locking with Jimmy Williams - one of the early UK street lockers, and attended workshops with internationally renowned guest choreographers like Bryant Baldwin (USA) and Mauro Mosconi (Italy).

== Career ==
=== Dance and choreography ===
Tamsier worked as a stage backing dancer for Mary Kiani, Kym Mazelle, Jocelyn Brown, Martha Wash, MN8, Take That, Honeyz, Impact Dance Productions (UK, Sadler's Wells) and also appeared on Janet Jackson's 1995 World Tour at Wembley Arena (London leg of the tour, small portion). Some of his musical theatre work include Starlight Express, Fame, Rent, Hot Mikado and The Wiz. Choreographic work include "Consecrated Love" for the Yozo Fass Dance Theatre Company, which he co-choreographed and performed in; "Dance Fusion" for the Choreographer's Ball (London); and "Our Town Story" for East London (London Borough of Hackney) with Ujamaa Arts, supported by McDonald's for the year 2000 Millennium Dome Show.

Along with his experience in mainstream dance genres such as jazz and ballet, Tamsier was also involved in the underground London vogue scene during the late 1980s or early 1990s. By the early to late 1990s, Tamsier was one of the most recognisable New way voguers within the London underground scene and worked extensively in several London clubs as a podium dancer / voguer including Heaven Nightclub, Equinox, The Tube, Lowdown, Trade, Vox and Busby's. It was whilst working as a dancer in the early 1990s at Heaven that Tamsier met the legendary Jean Michel who will become one of his closest friends and vogue mentor. The two regularly frequented the London club scene giving performances and engaging in vogue battles with other London voguers.

In 1997 whilst working for Heaven Nightclub's host and performer — Miss Kimberley as a backing voguer, Tamsier was interviewed and photographed by the alternative culture magazine Bizarre. Tamsier's "interesting look and voguing talent" made him a prime candidate for an interview. Tamsier credited his old friend and mentor Jean Michel for teaching him the elements of vogue and for mentoring him, as well as watching legendary U.S. voguers like Willi Ninja and Hector Xtravaganza. As a regular user of Pineapple Dance Studios in Covent Garden and Danceworks in Bond Street, Tamsier encouraged his mentor to run vogue classes in these studios. When Jean Michel was finally given a spot at Danceworks, Tamsier helped spread the word among his dancer friends "some of whom have had no exposure to real voguing other than what they've seen on Madonna's 1990 Vogue video." Tamsier regularly attended the class and supported his mentor.

=== Teaching ===
Tamsier was a dance teacher and lecturer, teaching jazz, ballet and contemporary. He taught at Carol Straker Dance School in London, Wood Green High School College of Sports, the University of Birmingham and the London Guildhall University. Tamsier ran workshops in various inner city schools in London and the Midlands. He was a dance coach/consultant for Sandwell and Dudley Borough Council in partnership with the region's development agency (Advantage West Midlands) and ran dance workshops throughout the West Midlands and also taught the Qualifications and Curriculum Authority's GCSE and A-level dance syllabi at various schools in the region including the A-level labanotation syllabus. He also taught advance/professional jazz at various dance studios including Adage Dance Studios in Harborne (Birmingham).

=== Retirement and comeback ===
Tamsier retired from professional dancing (on-and-off) in 2001 to pursue other business ventures, taking only non-lengthy dance contracts or teaching. In March 2015, Tamsier came out of retirement to appear on FKA twigs music video "Glass & Patron" as a vogue dancer starring alongside Javier Ninja, David Magnifique and Benjamin Milan. The video was officially released on FKA twigs YouTube channel on Monday, 23 March 2015.

== Acting and modelling ==
Tamsier did some acting and modelling during his career working with artistic directors like Michel Wallace (the French choreographer and artistic director of the Yozo Fass Dance Theatre Company) and Paa C Quaye (the Ghanaian actor—director and artistic director of Ujamaa Arts). Tamsier appeared as background actor in the 2002 drama Dirty Pretty Things; in the 2003 comedy Love Actually.; and in the 2024 American musical fantasy film Wicked (and Wicked: For Good (2025) as Ozian dancer)) as an Emerald City dancer and salon owner, reprising his role from the 2000 and 2001 Flymonkey Productions of The Wiz (also starring Sharon D. Clarke, 2000). He also appears as a dancer in the upcoming Netflix film Eloise, directed by Amy Sherman-Palladino, and starring Ryan Reynolds. Tamsier was also a film, television and theatre costume model for Academy Costumes, and one of his major modelling jobs was modelling the costumes of the Tomb Raider 2 film directed by Jan de Bont and starring Angelina Jolie.

== Entrepreneur and radio broadcasting ==
Tamsier was a former director of Bluewings Employment Security & Training Limited and Blue Light Training Services Limited both of which he resigned from and now runs his own businesses. He is an investor in African businesses seeking start-up or expansion capital through MYC4. Tamsier was also the founder of the Seereer Resource Centre (SRC), an organisation he conceived in 2008. The SRC preserves and promotes Seereer culture. Tamsier is a member of that ethnic group. He is co-author of Learn to speak Saafi-Saafi: The complete language course and author of the Learn to speak the Seereer languages syllabus. Tamsier is also the founder of Seereer Radio which broadcast 24/7 for the Serer and Senegambian community. Tamsier is a presenter on Seereer Radio and is the main anchor on the Cosaan Seereer Show, a weekly cultural program which he co-hosts with Demba Sene, Mamadou Fall, Moussoukoro Sidibé and new host Laity Sene. He is also a regular on the Open Mic Show presented by Mamadou Fall, and the founder of Seereer Heritage record label, a segment of Seereer Heritage Press, itself the imprint and publishing house of the SRC.

Tamsier is a strong opponent of President Yahya Jammeh's regime and regularly speaks out against the brutality of the Jammeh regime on Seereer Radio, and occasionally on Gainako Radio. Tamsier regularly visits the Gambia to report on the country's political situation for Seereer Radio. He covered the trial of lawyer Ousainou Darboe and his Executive Committee, 9 May 2016 political prisoners - imprisoned for demanding electrical reform and the Gambian presidential election, 2016. He is one of few (if not the only) Gambian radio presenters living in the diaspora that regularly criticises the Jammeh regime yet continues to enter the country. Whilst he was still in the Gambia covering the 2016 presidential election and the release of Ousainou Darboe from jail, he continued to criticise the brutality of the Jammeh regime as he has done on previous visits. When asked by his colleagues whether he fears for his life being so candid about his criticism of the Jammeh regime, he replied "I may not be born here but my grandparents were born here and have fought and died for this country. If I do not have more stake in this country than Jammeh, then Jammeh certainly does not have more stake in this country than me." On the same topic, Tamsier had said on the Open Mike and Cosaan Seereer shows that "a real Serer does not fear death." He is also known for carrying out investigative journalism against the Jammeh regime and his enablers and outing them on the radio. He is one of few radio critics of Jammeh to have interviewed President-Elect Adama Barrow face-to-face on Gambian soil during the Jammeh regime (done at least twice). The first being Barrow's election campaign in Bakau on 29 November 2016, and after his victory in the 2016 presidential election - face-to-face interview at the Kairaba Hotel on 7 December 2016.

During the COVID-19 pandemic, Tamsier organised a fund raising initiative to help Seereer artists in Senegal and Gambia - financially impacted by COVID-19 due to their inability to work. In collaboration with his organisations, the Seereer Resource Centre (SRC) and Seereer Radio, they raised over 1.5 million Senegalese CFA and food products. That was the first time any Senegambian (Senegalese and Gambian) media house or organisation has raised money for the Seereer artistic community. The event was covered by other Senegalese media houses - with Seereer Radio's current Director of Programmes, Laity Sene speaking to the Senegalese media in a press conference - in order to advance the plight of Seereer artists. As part of his philanthropic initiative, Tamsier's organisations (the Seereer Resource Centre and Seereer Radio) were also the official sponsors of the current King of Sine Niokhobaye Fatou Diène Diouf's forth anniversary in February 2022 since his enthronement in 2019; and the current King of Saloum Thierno Coumba Daga Ndao's celebration of the annual Gamo Kahone festival in 2022. Tamsier is a relative of both Kings. Tamsier is also the creator, concept author, co-producer, and executive producer of Seereer Heritage label's ambitious single Ceereer ne ino mbogun (and its accompanying album Ino mbogu Ceereer ne) consisting of twenty-four of Senegal's most notable Seereer artists, which received great reviews and play times on Senegalese and Gambian radio stations since its release on 15 December 2022.

== Personal life and controversy ==
"One cannot love Seereer history and culture yet despise Seereer religion. Seereer history and culture are closely linked to Seereer religion and cannot be separated from it. The true history and culture of the Seereer people is embedded in Seereer religion. And in similarity, the true history and culture of the African people is embedded in the Traditional African religions. To truly understand and appreciate our great history and culture, we must first love, respect and honour the religion of our forefathers in its orthodox form, free from any syncretism or dilution. Only then would we be able to decipher Seereer religion with a clean and open heart to get to the bottom of our true history and culture. It is in the Seereer religion where the secret ingredients which make up our history, culture, philosophy and civilisations are found."

— Tamsier Joof Aviance

Although Tamsier was brought up in a Muslim household, he rejected Islam in his early life and became a devout follower of A ƭat Roog (the Seereer religious faith, religion of his ancestors). In his Open Mike broadcast titled: Prejudice against Seereer religion (A ƭat Roog) and other Traditional African religions in Senegambia and other parts of Africa (Wednesday, 8 February 2017), Tamsier criticised some quarters of the Senegambian and African Muslim and Christian communities by referring to them as "hypocrites who like to demonise the traditional religions of their forefathers—yet when their prayers are not answered by their foreign Gods, they revert to the religions of their ancestors through Traditional African religious seers/diviners—seeking answers or solutions to their problems." Tamsier went on to state that: "One cannot love Senegambian history and culture or African history and culture for that matter yet despise Traditional African religion, because African history and culture are deeply rooted in the Traditional African religions."

Tamsier is also known for criticising the powerful Muslim brotherhoods of Senegal and their families for their "greed", "selfishness", and meddling in Senegalese politics; the Mauritanian government for failing to eradicate slavery in Mauritania and the African Union and ECOWAS for their failure to intervene and eradicate this "ghastly practice" in Mauritania. He is also quite vocal in criticising the Senegalese Muslim Marabout schools' (daraa) "abuse of children" (talibés ) sent to their Quranic schools for learning, through the use of "physical abuse", "starvation", "cruely", and being sent to beg on the streets of Senegal. Tamsier is a strong Pan-Africanist and supporter of Zionism, and known for his anti-Arab and anti-Islamic sentiments.

Tamsier has been involved in several pro-African/Black and pro-Israeli/Jewish demonstrations and activism, including joining and supporting a counter pro-Israeli demonstrations against pro-Palestine demonstrators demanding the closure of the Israeli Embassy in London; and showing support to the Jewish community following the Manchester synagogue attack on 2 October 2025 — where he expressed strong anti-Arab and anti-Islamic sentiments referring to them as "bullies, terrorist, and jihadists", and referred to the Israeli-Hamas war as a "religious war" perpetrated by Arabs and "Arab Islam" rather than a war about land. Tamsier went on to say that, Arabs and "Arab Islam" want to annihilate the State of Israel and all the Jews around the world, and once they finished with the Jews, they would be coming for all of us... and we should not let that happen." The ethnic and religious persecution of Serers by Islamic jihadists goes back one thousand years, since the 11th century. Tamsier is a member of the Serer ethnoreligious group, and a devout follower of A ƭat Roog (Serer spirituality), whose people have faced religious persecution for one thousand years.

== Filmography ==
Filmography & Music Video
| Year | Film | Character/role |
|---|---|---|
| 2002 | Dirty Pretty Things | Smart Man (Bus)/airport passenger |
| 2003 | Lara Croft: Tomb Raider – The Cradle of Life | Costume Booking |
| 2003 | Love Actually | Black Audience Ethnic |
| 2015 | FKA Twigs' Glass & Patron | Dancer (music video) |
| 2024 | Wicked | Ozian - Emerald City Dancer & Salon Owner |
| 2025 | Wicked: For Good | Ozian Dancer |
| Upcoming (in production) | Eloise (Netflix film, directed by Amy Sherman-Palladino, starring Ryan Reynolds) | Dancer |

== See also ==
- List of dancers
