= Scooter LaForge =

American artist (born 1971)

- Born: 1971 (age 54–55); Las Cruces, New Mexico, U.S.
- Education: University of Arizona; Cooper Union
- Occupation: artist
- Awards: Pollock-Krasner Foundation grant
- Website: scooter-laforge.com

Scooter LaForge (born 1971) is an American artist based in New York's East Village. He is a painter and sculptor, and has a line of clothing for Patricia Field and has collaborated with other fashion designers. LaForge's work is "inspired by the old masters, cute fluffy animals, and sometimes iconic cartoons," drawing from a number of pop culture and artistic references, ranging from Disney and Popeye to Keith Haring and Rembrandt.

The New York Times has described his work as "recalling the Neo-Expressionism that was popular in the '80s, the manic Neo-Surrealism of George Condo, and the comics-to-graffiti-to-canvas style of Kenny Scharf." Pop culture journalist Michael Musto has called him "my favorite living artist".

== Early life ==
LaForge was born Scooter James LaForge in 1971 in Las Cruces, New Mexico.

== Work ==
LaForge earned a BFA from the University of Arizona in 1993, and began his career as a painter in San Francisco. He moved to New York City in 2001, attending the Cooper Union School of Art under a fellowship. His work is held in the collections of the Leslie-Lohman Museum of Art and collector Beth Rudin DeWoody.

LaForge has a line of hand-painted clothing sold through stylist Patricia Field. He has twice collaborated with Belgian designer Walter Van Beirendonck.

His clothing has been worn by Susanne Bartsch, Sandra Bernhard, Beyoncé, Miley Cyrus, Boy George, Debbie Harry, Nicki Minaj, Madonna, Iggy Pop, Rihanna, and Lil Wayne.

== Exhibitions ==
=== Solo ===
- 2002 – Suicidal Tendencies, Build, San Francisco
- 2003 – No Sleep till Brooklyn, Landing, Brooklyn
- 2004 – Magic, San Angel Folk Art Gallery, San Antonio
- 2005 – Combines, 12 Little West 12th Street Gallery, New York
- 2007 – Land of Enchantment, Kanvas Gallery, New York
- 2009
  - Destroy All Monsters, Live Fast, New York
  - Nature's Clown, Envoy Enterprises, New York
  - New York Monster, Envoy Enterprises, New York
  - New Paintings, La Petite Mort Gallery, Ottawa
- 2012 – Super Powers and Special Abilities, Munch Gallery, New York
- 2013 – Summer Love, Deluca Gallery, Provincetown
- 2015
  - Travels with Johnny, Munch Gallery, New York
  - New Paintings, Galerie MX, Montreal
  - How to Create a Monsterpiece, Howl! Happening, New York
- 2016 – Everything's Going to Be OK, Theodore Art, Brooklyn
- 2017 – The Odyssey, Jealous Gallery, London
- 2019
  - Creation of the Animals, Empirical Nonsense, New York
  - Homo Eruptus, Howl! Happening, New York
- 2024 – Scooter LaForge: Enchanted Anarchies and Other Realities, Lesley Art + Design, Cambridge
- 2025 – LaForge, Sweetie! The Fashion Universe of Scooter LaForge, Lesley Art + Design, Cambridge

=== Group ===
- 2000 – Confess, Southern Exposure, San Francisco
- 2001 – Frenzy, The Luggage Store Gallery, San Francisco
- 2004 – Reactions, Exit Art, New York
- 2005
  - 4 x 4, Gallery Artopia, Albuquerque
  - Wooster Projects, New York
- 2006
  - Portraits for Marc Jacobs windows, New York
  - Cooper Union Group Show, New York
  - Scope Hampton, Stephanie Theodore, New York
- 2007
  - Remember Jerome, Bucheon Gallery, San Francisco
  - The Comic Uncanny, Shaheen Modern & Contemporary, Cleveland
- 2009
  - The Thin Veil, Antebellum Gallery, Los Angeles
  - Out of Order, Andrew Edlin Gallery, New York
- 2010
  - The Salacious Salon Pool Art Fair, Gershwin Hotel, New York
  - Gasoline Rainbow, CS13, Cincinnati
  - I See Myself in You, Bronx Art Space, Bronx
  - Lingering Whispers, Crypt Gallery at St. Pancras Church, London
  - Power to the People, Feature, Inc., New York
  - Tom of Finland and Then Some, Feature, Inc., New York
  - The London Biennale, Christopher Henry Gallery, New York
- 2011
  - Wolfpack!, Splatterpool Artspace, Brooklyn
  - Queer from Zero to a Hundred, theater for the New City Gallery, New York
  - B-B-B-Bad, Anna Kustera Gallery, New York
  - Tattoo You, Munch Gallery, New York
  - Dirty Show, City Center Motel, Los Angeles
  - I Am Not Monogamous, I Heart Poetry/Feature, Inc., New York
- 2012
  - Flesh Garden, YESSR4, Buenos Aires
  - Fountain Art Fair, Munch Gallery, New York
  - Scooter LaForge/Christopher Moss, Theodore Art, Brooklyn
  - Wolfpack: Manhattan to Manchester, Cube Gallery, Manchester
- 2013 – Downtown New York, Broome Street Gallery, New York
- 2014
  - Boys Keep Swinging, Summerhall, Edinburgh
  - Bibbidi-Bibbidi-Boo, Here Arts Center, New York
  - Flesh Garden, La Petite Mort Gallery, Amsterdam
  - Mad Maus, Gallery Hotel Particulier, New York
  - Watermill Center Benefit Auction, Watermill
  - Queer Biennial, Coagula Curatorial, Los Angeles
  - NEWD Art Fair, Bushwick, Bushwick
  - SummerShow2014, Munch Gallery, New York
- 2015
  - Interface, Leslie-Lohman Museum, New York
  - Powerful Babies, Spritmuseum, Stockholm
  - Drawings, Theodore Art, Brooklyn
- 2019
  - ICYMI, Theodore Art, Brooklyn
  - Stonewall 50/50, 1969 Gallery, New York
  - Pride, Postmasters Gallery, New York
- 2020 – Dogs and Bones, Theodore Art, Brooklyn
