= Adam Joseph =

American singer-songwriter (born 1982)

- Born: Adam Joseph Hodges; January 10, 1982 (age 44)
- Genres: R&B; soul; dance; pop; house
- Occupations: CEO; singer-songwriter; record producer; actor; engineer
- Instruments: Vocals; guitar; keyboard; beatbox; Fender rhodes
- Years active: 2002–present
- Labels: Gomination; Jah Records; Aviance Records
- Website: AJoMusic.com

Adam Joseph (born Adam Joseph Hodges; January 10, 1982) is an American singer-songwriter, and music producer. Joseph has released two albums and 16 singles during his career. He is also the president of his own recording label, Jah Records. Joseph has composed and written songs for many singers including Jonny McGovern, Ari Gold, Lea Lorien, Alex Kassel, and other recording artists and musicians.

Following the establishment of his record label, he released his debut studio album How I Seem to Be, which spawned two singles: "Flow with My Soul" and "You're Mine". He released a single, "Faggoty Attention", in 2007 which generated international attention. The song was featured in the film A Four Letter Word. Joseph later recorded with several other singers and made album appearances. In 2012, he signed with Gomination Records and released a single "Turn Me Out". Joseph released "What's A Lover to Do" in 2013 from his second album Love Philosophy, released in February 2014.

== Early life ==
In 1993, he attended the School for Creative and Performing Arts in Cincinnati, Ohio. In 2000, Joseph attended Berklee College of Music in Boston, Massachusetts. In 2003, he graduated with intense training in music production and engineering, vocal performance, and music business.

== Music career ==
=== 2003–2007: How I Seem to Be ===
In 2003, Joseph established his self-owned record label Jah Records. In December 2003, he released his first album, How I Seem to Be. Joseph wrote, arranged, and produced the entire album. The music video for album's first single "Flow with My Soul" received heavy rotation on MTV's Logo Network. In 2004, he moved to New York City, where he created Elegant Children Productions, his own production company. The music video for the second single "You're Mine" aired on Logo in 2007.

In 2006, Joseph joined electronica-pop-rap crossover group Team Pimp. The group consists of Jonny McGovern, Linda James, Maxi J, Ericka Toure Aviance, and Adam Joseph. As Team Pimp, the group recorded several songs including "Somethin' for the Fellas (That Like the Fellas)", "Bossy Bottom", and "Dick Swang Out!", which appeared on Jonny McGovern's second album "Gays Gone Wild".

=== 2007–2012: Faggoty Attention and TransporTour ===
In 2007, Joseph released a single entitled "Faggoty Attention". The music video (directed by Francis Legge) received heavy rotation on Logo. In the same year, Joseph began producing records for Ari Gold, Jason Walker, and Jonny McGovern.

In 2008, Joseph released a maxi-single for "Faggoty Attention". Joseph also toured with Ari Gold and Kelly King on the TransporTour. In 2009, Joseph released a cover of CeCe Peniston's 1990s dance hit "Finally". In November 2009, Joseph released a single entitled "Takin' You Home (for Christmas)". In 2010, Joseph was featured on Bob Sinclar's album Born in 69 on the song "The Way I Feel". In 2012, Joseph released a series of single-only releases.

=== 2013–present: Love Philosophy ===
In 2013, Joseph released the single 'What's a Lover to Do'. In February 2014, he released his second album Love Philosophy. In April 2017, Joseph scored a viral hit with "Linda Evangelista", a remix of RuPaul's Drag Race contestant Aja's sarcastic rant toward fellow contestant Valentina ("You're perfect, you're beautiful, you look like Linda Evangelista, you're a model").

== Personal life ==
In 2007, Joseph identified as a gay man.

== Discography ==
Albums

- 2003: How I Seem to Be
- 2014: Love Philosophy

Singles

- 2003: "Flow with My Soul"
- 2003: "You're Mine"
- 2006: "Faggoty Attention"
- 2009: "Takin' You Home (for Christmas)"
- 2009: "Finally"
- 2010: "Can't Stop" (Noel G. featuring Adam Joseph)
- 2011: "Chasing the Dream" (with Alex Kassel)
- 2012: "No Sleep Tonight"
- 2012: "Racing After Love" (Mafia Mike featuring Adam Joseph)
- 2012: "All for You" (Plastik Funk featuring Adam Joseph)
- 2012: "Music Sounds Better with You" (Wet Fingers featuring Adam Joseph)
- 2012: "Turn Me Out"
- 2012: "Turn Me Out" (Remix)
- 2013: "One"
- 2013: "Believe"
- 2013: "What's a Lover to Do"
- 2015: "Radiant" (with DJ Inox)
- 2015: "Sinner"
- 2016: "Home" (Dzeko & Torres featuring Adam Joseph)
- 2016: "One Good Thing" (Box Office Poison aka Snax (musician) featuring Adam Joseph)
- 2017: "Linda Evangelista" (featuring Aja)
- 2018: "Voguing Right Now" (featuring Vanessa Hudgens)
- 2018: "Cookies" (featuring Vanessa Vanjie Mateo)
- 2018: "The Walmart Yodel" (featuring Mason Ramsey)
- 2019: "OPALANNNNNCE" (featuring Mercedes Iman Diamond)
- 2019: "100 People" (featuring Lady Gaga)
- 2019: "Gravity" (featuring Zach Adam)

Album appearances

Year	Song	Album
2007	"Girl, I Fucked Yo' Boyfriend" (Jonny McGovern featuring Adam Joseph and Erickatoure Aviance)	Gays Gone Wild
2007	"Bossy Bottom" (Jonny McGovern featuring Adam Joseph, Linda James, and Erickatoure Aviance)	Gays Gone Wild
2007	"Afterhours" (Jonny McGovern featuring Adam Joseph)	Gays Gone Wild
2007	"Gayboy Mansion" (Jonny McGovern featuring Adam Joseph)	Gays Gone Wild
2007	"I Likes to Have Funz" (Jonny McGovern featuring Adam Joseph, Steve Alexander, and Nic)	Gays Gone Wild
2007	"We Like to Freak" (Jonny McGovern featuring Mother Flawless Sabrina and Adam Joseph)	Gays Gone Wild
2007	"Somethin' for the Fellas (That Like the Fellas)" (Jonny McGovern featuring Adam Joseph, Linda James, and Erickatoure Aviance)	Gays Gone Wild
2007	"Dick Swang Out!" (Jonny McGovern featuring Adam Joseph, Linda James, and Erickatoure Aviance)	Gays Gone Wild
2007	"Somethin' for the Fellas (5am TEAM Work Remix)" (Jonny McGovern featuring Adam Joseph, Linda James, and Erickatoure Aviance)	Gays Gone Wild
2007	"Overture (Feels Like Gold)" (Ari Gold featuring Adam Joseph)	Transport Systems
2008	"Bossy Bottom (Booty House Mix)" (Jonny McGovern featuring Adam Joseph, Linda James, and Erickatoure Aviance)	Keep It Faggity: The Gay Pimp Remix Project
2008	"Dick Swang Out! (Team Work Runway Mix)" (Jonny McGovern featuring Adam Joseph, Linda James, and Erickatoure Aviance)	Keep It Faggity: The Gay Pimp Remix Project
2008	"Somethin' for the Fellas (5am TEAM Work Remix)" (Jonny McGovern featuring Adam Joseph, Linda James, and Erickatoure Aviance)	Keep It Faggity: The Gay Pimp Remix Project
2009	"A Song for the Hookers (Get Laid, Get Paid)" (Jonny McGovern featuring Adam Joseph, Linda James, and Erickatoure Aviance)	The East Village Mixtape Volume 2: The Legends Ball
2010	"Little Bit of Feel Good" (Something a La Mode featuring Adam Joseph)	Something a La Mode
2010	"Can't Stop" (Noel G. featuring Adam Joseph)	Born in 69
2011	"Out Dancing" (Ari Gold featuring Adam Joseph and Kelly King)	Between the Spirit and the Flesh
2011	"Bandoozle" (Jipsta featuring Adam Joseph)	Bandoozle
2012	"No Love Left" (with Alex Kassel)	Along the Way
2012	"Turn It Up" (with Alex Kassel)	Along the Way
2012	"Chasing the Dream" (with Alex Kassel)	Along the Way
2012	"Live Love" (with Alex Kassel)	Along the Way
2012	"All My People" (with Alex Kassel)	Along the Way
2012	"The Feeling" (The Ones featuring Adam Joseph)	Blast from the Past
2014	"Losing Game" (Something a La Mode featuring Adam Joseph)	Endless Stairs
2015	"Back in High School" (GoldNation featuring Adam Joseph)	Soundtrack to Freedom

== Music videos ==
Year	Title	Director(s)
2003	"Flow With My Soul"	George Lyter
2007	"You're Mine"	George Lyter & Aaron Cobbett
2007	"Faggoty Attention"	Francis Legge
2010	"Finally"	Adam Joseph and Josh Kesner
2010	"Can't Stop" (Noel G. featuring Adam Joseph)	Freddy Esposito
2011	"Sexy Nerd" (Jonny McGovern)	Michael Serrato
2013	"Music Sounds Better With You"	
2013	"What's A Lover to Do"	Adam Joseph, Josh Kesner
2015	"Radiant"	
2015	"Radiant (Inox Future Remix)"	

== Filmography ==
Film
Year	Title	Role	Notes
2008	A Four Letter Word	Club Singer	Cameo

== Awards and nominations ==
Glammy Awards

- 2008: Best Vocalist – Winner
- 2009: Best Male Performer – Nominated
- 2009: Best Vocalist – Winner
- 2010: Best Vocalist – Winner
- 2010: Best Male Performer – Nominated
- 2011: Best Male Performer – Nominated
- 2012: Best Male Performer – Nominated

OutMusic Awards

- 2004: Outstanding New Recording – Male for "How I Seem to Be" – Nominated
- 2004: Outstanding Debut Recording – Male for "How I Seem to Be" – Nominated
- 2004: Out Song of the Year for "Flow With My Soul" – Nominated
