= House of Aviance =

Ball house founded in Washington, D.C.

The Legendary House of Aviance
- Type: Ballroom House
- Founded: August 1989–Present (Founded in D.C)
- Founder: Mother Juan Aviance
- Headquarters: New York City, US
- Key people: Mother Juan Aviance, Daddy Tony Aviance, Kevin Aviance, John Aviance, Papa Joe Aviance, Jean-Philippe Aviance, Erickatoure Aviance, David Ohana Aviance, Tamsier Joof Aviance, Gehno Aviance, William Aviance, Nita Aviance
- Website: House of Aviance; Aviance Records, LLC
- Footnotes; The Legendary/Iconic House of Aviance is known for its vogue dancers, DJs, music, music producers, performances, runways and fashion, and is one of the longest continuously active houses in ball culture.

The House of Aviance (acronym: HOA) is one of the "legendary/iconic" and major vogue-ball houses in the United States, with its base in New York City. It was founded in Washington, D.C., in 1989 by voguer/dancer, record label owner (CEO/A&R), nightclub host, music artist and secretary Mother Juan Aviance—one of the nightlife personalities of New York City. Since its founding, the House has played an integral part in U.S. and world ball culture, especially U.S. nightlife.

The House of Aviance is one of the longest continuously active Houses to have emerged from the ball scene and is sometimes referred to as "a working house" with membership from all walks of life, sexualities and genders. Its membership include dancers, musicians, DJs, drag queens, performing artists, visual artists, singers, songwriters, music producers and engineers. The Legendary House of Aviance is especially known for its voguers, performances, runways, fashion, music, music producers and DJs. Its membership as of 2014 is just over 700 worldwide. Most of its members are or have been part of nightlife in one way or another.

The House has for a long time stopped competing (walking) in the ball scene, and as such, "is not exactly like the voguing houses of Jennie Livingston's film Paris Is Burning, since it does not compete. The House of Aviance is something of a queer kinship network in which members serve as extended, pretended, and—some would argue—improved family that supports and enables its members."

== History ==
The House of Aviance was founded in August 1989 by Mother Juan Aviance. The House began in Washington, D.C., on 1420 Harvard Street before it was moved in 1993 to New York City by Mother Juan. Since its move, New York has become its base, but it still plays an active role in New York and Washington, D.C.'s nightlife as well as other cities in the U.S. Since its inception, it has become one of the major Houses in New York's ballroom and voguing scene having won many trophies and cash prizes for their performances in ball competitions before the House ultimately stopped walking balls altogether.

Previously, The House of Aviance was called The House of Power. That remained the name for few weeks during its inception until Mother Juan decided to change it to The House of Aviance. According to Mother Juan, he was glancing at a vendor's cart on the streets of DC. The vendor was selling perfumes. As Mother Juan glanced at the cart, he remembered a commercial from his childhood days by Prince Matchabelli. That commercial contained a tune with the lyrics: "We're going to have an Aviance Night." In an epiphany, Mother Juan decided to rename the House to The House of Aviance. Since then, the name of the House has remained the same.

To commemorate their second anniversary, The House of Aviance threw its first ball on Sunday, August 11, 1991, titled "The Inferno Ball at Tracks DC". Most of the notable New York and DC houses walked that night, including Aviance members. Some of the judges that night included the icons Dorian Corey and Pepper LaBeija, both featured in the acclaimed Paris Is Burning film a year earlier.

Since its founding, Mother Juan Aviance has remained the "House Mother", and Daddy Tony Aviance the "House Father". As of 2017, they are two of the longest serving and continuously active house parents in ballroom house history. The House of Aviance's first DJ was Jean-Philippe Aviance who went on to produce Go Bitch Go! – "Work This Pussy" (Original Bitch Mix) in 1991, Useless, Give Me Luv – Alcatraz and several other tracks.

== Influences ==
=== Voguing ===
The Aviance style of voguing is referred to as "Aviance Storytelling". It is based on graceful, sharp and elegant lines with great fluidity and a high degree of experimentation and individuality. Fluidity is key in Aviance Storytelling. The style is narrative in structure and form, punctuated by an "A" or heart-like motif in certain phrases symbolizing the name of the House or the House's logo (The Sacred Heart of Aviance).

=== Music ===
The House of Aviance through its multi-genre record label (Aviance Records, LLC) has over the years produced house tracks like Avi'ously Aviance produced by David Ohana Aviance and featuring EJ Aviance, Kevin Aviance, Perry Aviance and Mother Juan Aviance; OVAH by Erickatoure Aviance; I Am Art by EJ Aviance; and the soulful track They Don't See—a collaboration between producer/remixer Call Me Cleve (Cleveland Allen) and vocalist Zhana Roiya. One of the most highly acclaimed musicians to have emerged from The House of Aviance is Kevin Aviance with House anthems like Alive, Cunty (The Feeling), Gimme More (Aviance), and Din Da Da.

The House of Aviance's first DJ Jean-Philippe Aviance's 1991 track Go Bitch Go! – "Work This Pussy" (Original Bitch Mix) has been covered and released numerous times by some highly acclaimed DJs such as Armand Van Helden in his 2014 Masterpiece. Britney Spears' 2013 track Work Bitch from her Britney Jean album is reported by critics like Barry Walters as a recreation of "the vogueing vibe of gay/trans bitch tracks like Go Bitch Go's "(Work This) Pussy" [Go Bitch Go! – "Work This Pussy"] originally produced by Jean-Philippe Aviance in 1991.

According to critic Christina Lee, Britney's Work Bitch track sounds more like RuPaul's 1993 track Supermodel (You Better Work). In 2009, DJs Chris Cox and Yiannis Mistress remixed Jean-Phillippe Aviance's "Giv Me Luv" track starring Dihann Moore. DJ/Producer David Ohana is a member of the House as well as business partner in Aviance Records. In 2017, rapper Prince Airick pays tribute to the House of Aviance in his single Act Up, and in 2022, the African American artist Beyoncé pays homage to some of the legendary ballroom houses and can be heard chanting the name of the House of Aviance in her track Break My Soul (The Queens Remix) featuring Madonna — from her Renaissance era. In the same album, she officially credits the House of Aviance's "oldest daughter" Kevin Aviance on her Pure/Honey track whose vocals and 1996 track Cunty (The Feeling) were sampled in the intro to Beyoncé's new track. This track is "dedicated to 'pioneers who originate culture,' specifically queer Black artists."

=== Fashion ===
"The Aviance look" is generally referred to as Avi'ously Aviance. The style is flamboyant, big and glamorous.

=== Coined phrases ===
The House of Aviance is also known in the ballroom scene for their coined phrases which in essence describes their "look" (the Aviance look) in reference to their sense of fashion, their voguing style and performance. Some of these coined phrases include:

- "Avi'ously Aviance" : This is in reference to their sense of fashion – big, glamorous and flamboyant. The debut track released by Aviance Records is titled Avi'ously Aviance.
- "Aviance Storytelling" : This is in reference to their voguing style – elegant, graceful, sharp, fluid, narrative in structure and form, and punctuated by an "A" or heart-like shaped motif in certain phrases, symbolizing Aviance or their House logo ("The Sacred Heart of Aviance").
- "Work. Fierce. Over. Aviance!" : This is the coined phrase and trademark of The House of Aviance's oldest daughter Kevin Aviance. It is in reference to their runway.
- "Avi'Who? Avi'What? It's Aviance darling!" (other variation: "Avi'What? Avi'Where? Isn't it Avi'ous darling!") : This is in reference to their music and the "fierceness" of the House in general. This chant can be heard on the first track released by Aviance Records titled Avi'ously Aviance.

== Withdrawal from ball competitions ==
My concern for the kids/members of the House far overshadows my desire for Ballroom fame

...

Some of the kids are fragile and want and need to be accepted and/or belong, but if they make one wrong move on the runway they are verbally abused and humiliated in front of their peers. In my opinion, I think people should be treated with more dignity and respect than what I've witnessed in the Ballroom. But make no mistakes I love the concept and despite all the things I find objectionable about the Ballroom I do remember where I came from.

— Mother Juan Aviance"

Despite winning numerous trophies and cash prizes for their performances in ballroom competitions over the years, the House suddenly stopped walking. According to Mother Juan, he decided to stop his House kids from walking balls because of "Ballroom politics", unfair judging and the negative atmosphere of the ballroom, such as verbal abuse, intimidation and humiliation especially where kids "make one wrong move on the runway."

== Current role ==
The House is still an active "working house" with over 700 members worldwide and regularly hold events/performances. Members still work or perform in their respective fields with support and guidance from house parents Mother Juan and Daddy Tony, as well as other family members. The House's oldest daughter, Kevin Aviance, made special appearances in Wolfgang Busch's 2006 documentary How Do I Look.

The documentary was a chronicle of the ball culture in Harlem. With the HIV and AIDS epidemic affecting the ballroom scene for decades, The House of Aviance is no exception, and the House and its membership has for years taken active roles in HIV/AIDS awareness and prevention as well as throwing charity events to support organisations like the GMHC.

== Some notable members ==
- Mother Juan Aviance – founder of HOA, House Mother, entrepreneur and voguer (U.S.)
- Daddy Tony Aviance – House Father
- Kevin Aviance – nightlife personality, drag artist and musician (U.S.)
- Erickatoure Aviance – artist and nightlife personality (U.S.)
- Jean-Philippe Aviance – DJ and music producer (U.S.)
- Tamsier Joof Aviance – dancer/voguer, choreographer, radio personality and entrepreneur
- Nita Aviance – former dancer turned DJ and a member of Carry Nation
- Kim Aviance – performance and visual artist
- Gehno Aviance – dancer/voguer, artist, movie and music producer, web designer, and DJ
