= Kevin Aviance =

American fashion designer

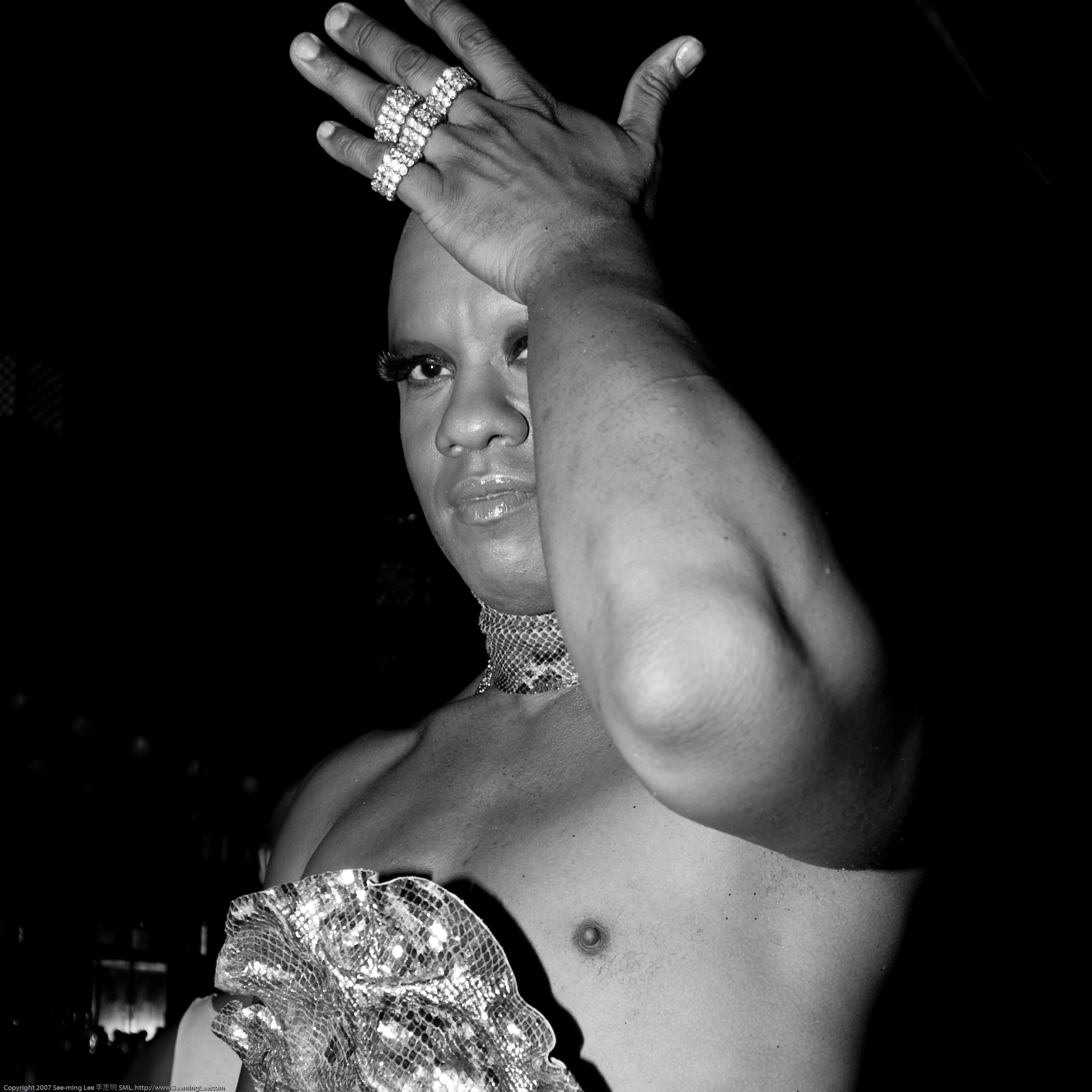
- Kevin Aviance in 2007

Background information
- Born: Eric Snead; June 22, 1968 (age 58)
- Origin: Richmond, Virginia, United States
- Genre: Dance
- Occupations: female impressionist, Club/Dance musician, fashion designer and nightclub personality
- Years active: 1989–present
- Website: Myspace

Kevin Aviance (born Eric Snead on June 22, 1968) is an American drag queen, club/dance musician, fashion designer, and nightclub personality. He is a personality in New York City's gay scene and has performed throughout North America, Europe and Asia. He is a member of the House of Aviance, one of the most notable vogue-ball houses in the U.S. He is known for his trademark phrase, "Work. Fierce. Over. Aviance!" He won the 1998 and 1999 Glammy Awards, the award for nightlife personalities in New York City. He has worked with several artists, including Janet Jackson and Whitney Houston. In December 2016, Billboard Magazine ranked him as the 93rd most successful dance artist of all time.

== Career ==
Aviance was raised in Richmond, Virginia, in a close-knit family of eight siblings. His father provided for them as a landscape contractor. From an early age, Aviance dedicated himself to the study of music and theatre, his first experience in drag was in the seventh grade. His early influences were "punk, Boy George, Devo, and Grace Jones". He moved to Washington D.C. where he worked as a hairdresser and did drag performances. He developed a bad crack habit but with help of the House of Aviance he was able to overcome it, after his initiation in the house he took the name Kevin Aviance. He later moved to New York City and made a name for himself as a dancer/performer at Sound Factory, a club mainly for queer Latinos and Blacks. Major DJs and club promoters saw him performing and started hiring him, he became one of a handful of drag performers in NYC able to support themselves solely on performances. His career as a performance artist and club personality began in Washington, DC, continued in Miami, and eventually landed him in New York City. The House of Aviance was founded in 1989 (in Washington, DC) by Mother Juan Aviance. Kevin is regarded as Mother Juan and the House's "oldest daughter". In 1993, Aviance, who was living in Florida at the time, was asked to move to New York City by Mother Juan. He accepted his House Mother's request and shortly after landed a cameo role in Madonna's 1994 Secret video. In July 1999, Aviance performed as part of Billboard's sixth annual Dance Music Summit.

Aviance has appeared in several films, including Flawless starring Robert De Niro and the independent film Punks. Besides his feature-film work he has made guest appearances on such shows as The Tyra Banks Show, and America's Next Top Model, also hosted by Tyra Banks, and worked with artists like Janet Jackson and Whitney Houston. In 2015, Canadian filmmaker Raymond Helkio produced the documentary "WERK. FIERCE. OVAH. Aviance!" which premiered at the 2018 NYC East Village Queer Film Festival.

His songs Din Da Da, Rhythm Is My Bitch, Alive, Give It Up and Strut, have all reached Number 1 of the Billboard dance chart. The only one of his singles not to peak at Number 1 to date is Dance for Love. Aviance's most successful dance radio hit to date is Give It Up released in 2004. His second album, Entity is a more consistent effort than his first.

== Hate crime incident ==
On June 10, 2006, while exiting the Phoenix, a popular gay bar located in the East Village section of Manhattan, Aviance was robbed and beaten by a group of men who yelled anti-gay slurs at him. Four suspects were arrested under New York's hate-crime law, but reports say up to seven men were involved in the attack. Aviance was not dressed in his gender-bending performance clothes but as a boy. He had to have his jaw wired for a month. He also suffered a fractured knee and neck injuries as well as blows to the face. Despite suffering a broken jaw, he insisted on appearing in the city's gay pride parade later that month.

The four suspects, who ranged between 17 and 21 years old, were charged with gang assault as a hate crime. On March 21, 2007, they pleaded guilty and were sentenced to between six and fifteen years in prison. Without the plea agreement, they had faced up to 25 years.

== Recent times ==
Aviance lip-syncing at the Q in 2021

Recently, Aviance appeared on the song This is New York City (Bitch!) by the transgender rap group La'Mady from the album Jonny McGovern Presents: This is NYC, Bitch! The East Village Mixtape. In 2007, Aviance's song Strut was featured as the theme song for the documentary series Indie Sex. In April 2008, Aviance staged a comeback to the club scene and entertainment world, and was reunited on stage with Junior Vasquez, who previously worked together but had become estranged over a professional dispute. At Cielo, a club in New York known for its lighted walls, the tandem performance marked the return to the spotlight for Aviance, performing two of his new hit singles. He most recently recorded a cover of Britney Spears's Gimme More, produced by Jonny McGovern and Adam Joseph on The East Village Mixtape 2: The Legends Ball. In 2022, Aviance's hit song "Cunty" was sampled for 15 seconds on Beyoncé's seventh studio album Renaissance for the track "Pure/Honey".

In May 2026, Aviance premiered a new single with fellow Black and queer artist SEVNDEEP entitled "THAT PART".

== Albums ==
- Box of Chocolates (Wave Music) 1999
- Entity (Centaur) 2004
- HIPPOPOTAMUS! (Chervana Music) 2025

== Singles ==
- Cunty (The Feeling) (1996) [Strictly Rhythm]
- Hold On Me [with Tom Stephan & The S-Man]
- Din Da Da (1997)
- Join In The Chant (1998)
- Rhythm Is My Bitch (1999)
- Dance For Love (2000)
- Alive (2002)
- Give It Up (2004)
- Strut (2007)
- Gimme More (Aviance) (2008) [Gay/Nerd Music]
- Avi'ously Aviance (2014) featuring EJ Aviance, Kevin Aviance, Perry Aviance and Mother Juan Aviance; produced by David Ohana Aviance. Released on Aviance Records
- THAT PART (2026) with SEVNDEEP

== Filmography ==
- Punks, UrbanWorld (2000) as "Miss Smokie" a club owner, Patrick-Ian Polk, director.
- Freaks, Glam Gods and Rockstars, RyanIsland Films (2001), John T. Ryan director.
- "Naked Fame", Regent Here! Films (2005), Christopher Long, director.
- "WERK. FIERCE. OVAH. Aviance!", The Reading Salon, Raymond Helkio, director.
- "Wig"', HBO Films (2019), Chris Moukarbel, director
- "How Do I Look"', Art From The Heart Films (2008), Wolfgang Busch, director

== See also ==
- House of Aviance
- Mother Juan Aviance
- Ball culture
- Drag culture in New York City
- LGBTQ culture in New York City
- List of LGBTQ people from New York City
- NYC Drag March
- NYC Pride March
- Transgender culture in New York City
- List of Number 1 Dance Hits (United States)
- List of artists who reached number one on the US Dance chart
- How Do I Look website, about the Harlem Drag Balls
- Violence against LGBT people

== Bibliography ==
- Boyd, Helen, She's not the man I married: my life with a transgender husband, Seal Press, 2007, ISBN 1-58005-193-6, ISBN 978-1-58005-193-4.
- Lust, Erika, Good Porn: A Woman's Guide, Seal Press, 2010, ISBN 1-58005-306-8, ISBN 978-1-58005-306-8.
- Munoz, Jose Esteban, "Gesture, Ephemera, and Queer Feeling: Approaching Kevin Aviance" in Dancing desires: choreographing sexualities on and off the stage, edited by Jane Desmond, Univ of Wisconsin Press, 2001, ISBN 0-299-17054-3, ISBN 978-0-299-17054-7.
- Pezzote, Angelo, Straight Acting: Gay Men, Masculinity and Finding True Love, Kensington Publishing Corp., 2008, ISBN 0-7582-1943-1, ISBN 978-0-7582-1943-5.
- Warwick, Neil, Jon Kutner, Tony Brown, The complete book of the British charts: singles & albums, Omnibus Press, 2004, ISBN 1-84449-058-0, ISBN 978-1-84449-058-5.
- Willis, John, Tom Lynch, Barry Monush, Screen World, Volume 53; Volume 2002, Hal Leonard Corporation, 2003, ISBN 1-55783-599-3, ISBN 978-1-55783-599-4.
- Willis, John, Barry Monush, Screen World Film Annual: Volume 57, r Hal Leonard Corporation, 2006, ISBN 1-55783-706-6, ISBN 978-1-55783-706-6.
- Wright, Kai, Drifting toward love: black, brown, gay, and coming of age on the streets of New York, Beacon Press, 2008, ISBN 0-8070-7968-5, ISBN 978-0-8070-7968-3.
