= Vogue (dance) =

Style of modern house dance

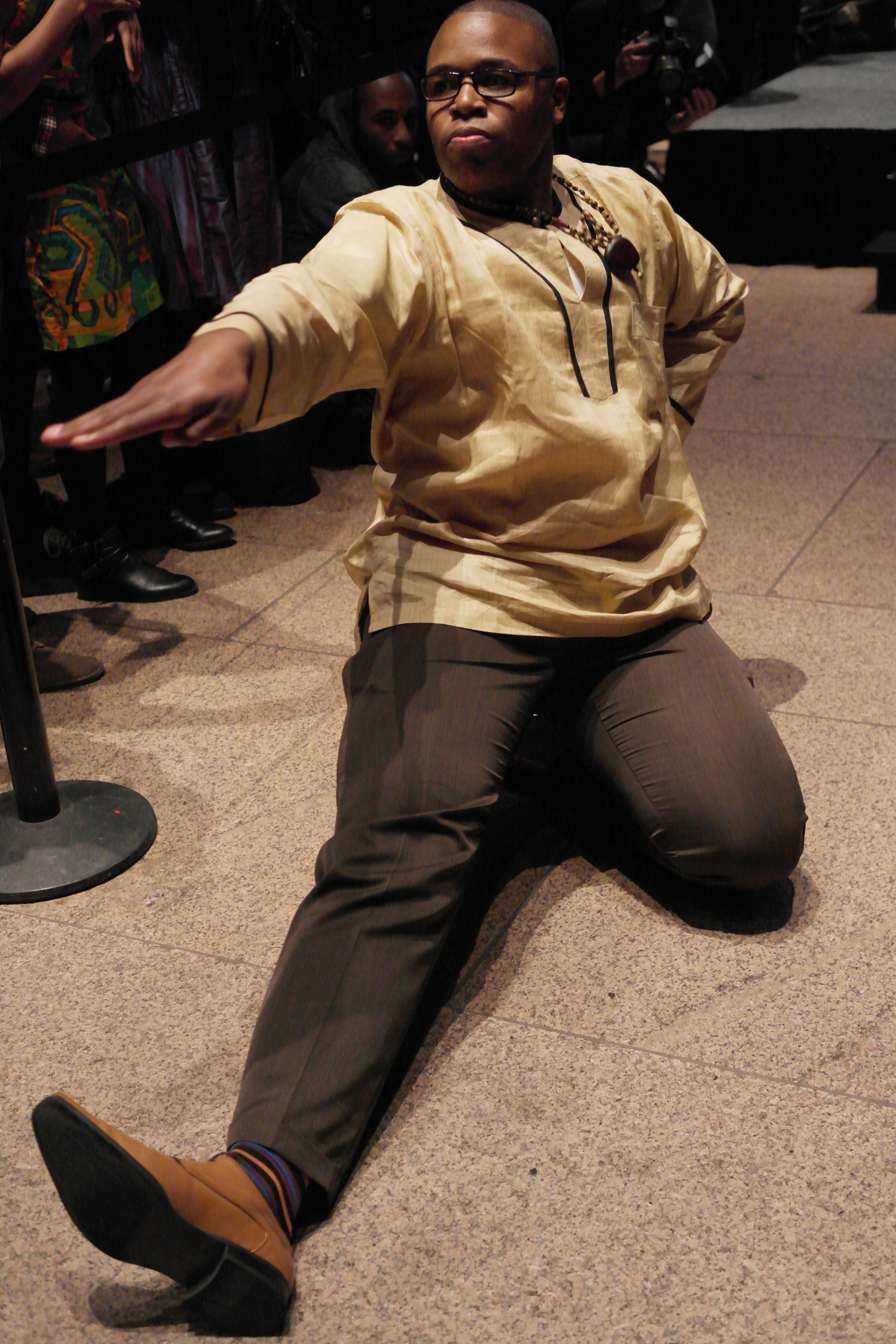
- Performer voguing in the old way at the Vogue Ball, National Museum of African Art, 2016
- Origin: Ball culture, Harlem, New York City, United States

Vogue, or voguing, is a highly stylized, modern house dance originating in the late 1980s that evolved out of the Harlem ballroom scene of the 1960s. It is inspired by the poses of models in fashion magazines, especially the American magazine Vogue, which gave the dance its name.

It gained mainstream exposure when it was featured in Madonna's song and video "Vogue" (1990), and when showcased in the 1990 documentary Paris Is Burning (which went on to win the Grand Jury Prize at the 1991 Sundance Film Festival). In its modern form, this dance has become a global phenomenon that continues to evolve both stylistically and demographically.

== History ==
This style of dance arose from African American Harlem ballroom cultures, as danced by African-American and participating Latino gay men and transfeminine individuals, from the early 1960s through the 1980s. The Harlem Renaissance shaped a distinctly African American and Latino LGBTQ culture in Harlem from 1920 to 1935, which included advancement in literature, arts and music and attempted to demonstrate that aspects of identity like race, gender and sexuality can be fluid and intersecting.

The balls that began during this time eventually shifted from elaborate pageantry to vogue dance battles. The dance battles consisted of dance learned during prison years. Inspired by the style of ancient Egyptian hieroglyphs and the famous images of models in Vogue magazine, voguing is characterized by striking a series of poses as if one is modeling for a photo shoot. Arm and leg movements are angular, linear, rigid, and move swiftly from one static position to another.

Dance competitions often involved throwing "shade", or subtle insults directed at one another in order to impress the judges and the audience. The competition style was originally called "presentation" and later "performance". Over the years, the dance evolved into the more intricate and acrobatic form that is now called "vogue".

Vogue dance presents gender as a performance. Drag queens pretend to apply makeup ("beat face"), style hair and don extravagant clothing through the dance moves. Depending on the competition category, participants may perform the traditional behaviors of their assigned gender to demonstrate "realness", or passing as straight. Although there are varying gender and sexuality classifications and categories, each fits into either female figure (FF) or male figure (MF). Female figure includes trans women, cisgender women and drag queens, while male figure includes butch queens, butch women and transgender men. No matter the category, performances and competitions are camp, which embodies the spirit of extravagance and is exaggerated and artificial.

The precise origins of voguing are disputed. Although many cite the story in which Paris Dupree takes out a Vogue magazine and mimics the poses to the beat of the music (and other queens subsequently followed), there are other accounts that note voguing may have originated from black gay prison inmates at Rikers Island, performed for the attention of other men as well as throwing shade. Voguing is continually being developed further as an established dance form that is practiced in the Black and Latino gay ballroom scene, and clubs in major cities throughout the United States, centered in New York City.

== Styles ==
There are currently three distinct styles of vogue: old way (pre-1990); new way (post-1990); and vogue fem (circa 1995).

=== Old way ===
Old way is characterized by the formation of lines, symmetry, and precision in the execution of formations with graceful, fluid-like action. Egyptian hieroglyphs and fashion poses serve as the original inspirations for old way voguing. In its purest, historical form, old way vogue is a duel between two rivals. Traditionally, old way rules dictated that one rival must "pin" the other to win the contest. Pinning involved the trapping of an opponent so that they could not execute any movements while the adversary was still in motion (usually voguing movements with the arms and hands called "hand performance" while the opponent was "pinned" against the floor doing "floor exercises" or against a wall).

=== New way ===
New way is characterized by rigid movements coupled with "clicks" (limb contortions at the joints) and "arms control" (hand and wrist illusions, which sometimes includes tutting and locking). New way can also be described as a modified form of mime in which imaginary geometric shapes, such as a box, are introduced during motion and moved progressively around the dancer's body to display the dancer's dexterity and memory. New way involves incredible flexibility.

=== Vogue femme ===
Vogue femme ("fem" is derived from the French word femme, meaning "woman") is fluidity at its most extreme with exaggerated feminine movements influenced by ballet, jazz and modern dance. Styles of vogue fem performances range from dramatics (which emphasizes stunts, tricks, and speed) to soft (which emphasizes a graceful, beautiful, and easy flow continuations between the five elements). There are currently five elements of vogue fem:

- Duckwalk: The duck walk receives its name from the appearance the name references (a duck walking) that involves squatting on the heels and kicking the feet out while moving forward on the beat.
- Catwalk: Catwalking is an exaggerated feminine walk where the legs are crossed over each other, the hips are thrust from side to side, and the hands are thrown forward in opposition to the legs.
- Hands: In performance, the hands of the performer often told a story (demonstrated in the category hand performance/arms control) This is the component of performing used to throw shade. For example, miming an expression of horror at the way the opponents face looks.
- Floorwork: This component demonstrates the competitors' sensuality as they roll, twist, and otherwise move on the ground in such a way as to capture the attention of the judges.
- Spins and dips: The most recognizable feat in vogue fem. Dips (commonly miscalled death drops) can be described as a ground-level stunt. This can be executed by spiraling down to the floor and tucking one leg, while the other is extended and creating the illusion that one's head has touched the floor. This is to be executed on what is called the HA! a loud metallic crash in the music or verbal "HA!" heard throughout music to accent this specific movement. The dip originated from pop, dip, and spin which is the foundation and base of old way.
A participant at the National Museum of African Art's 2016 Voguing Masquerade Ball

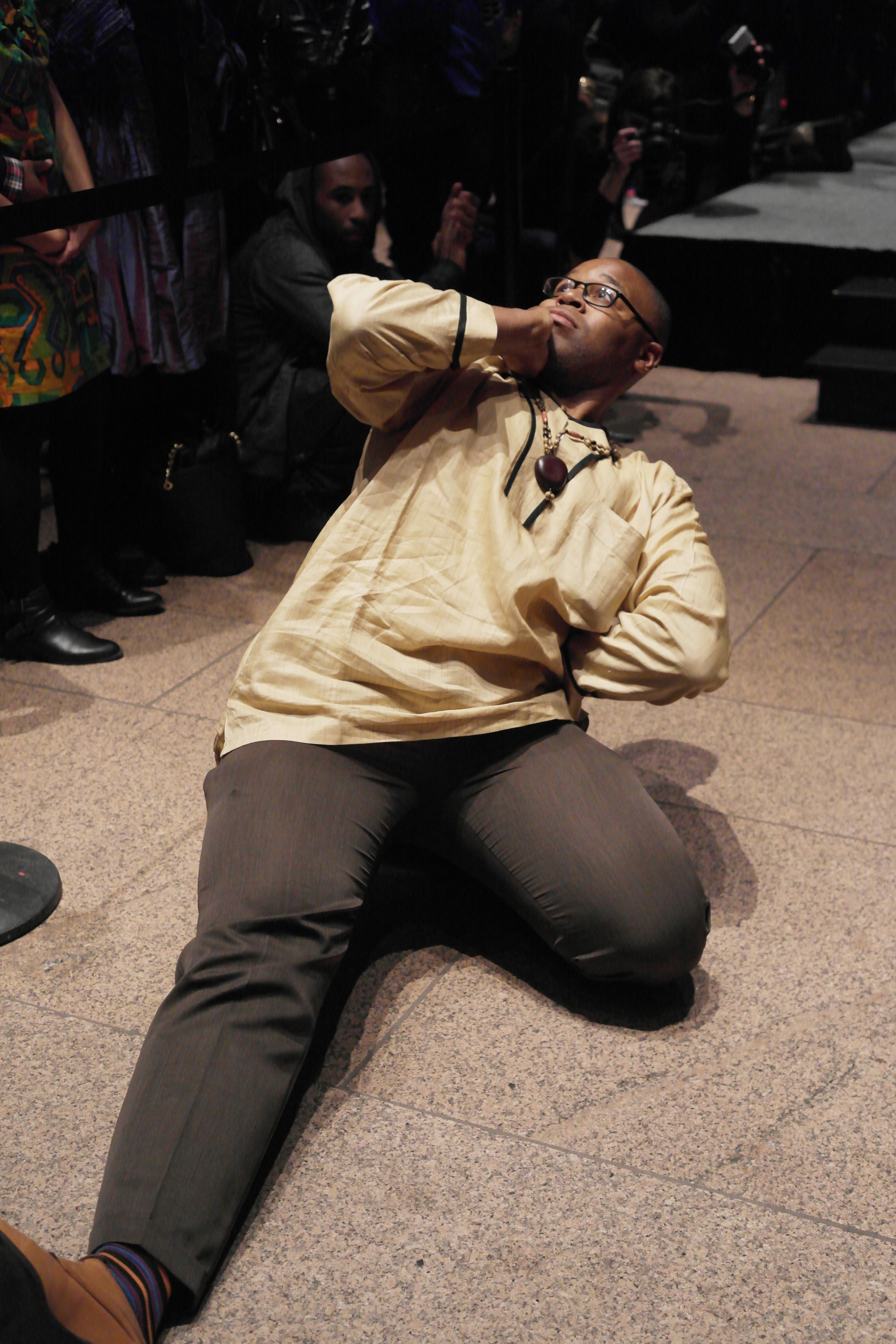

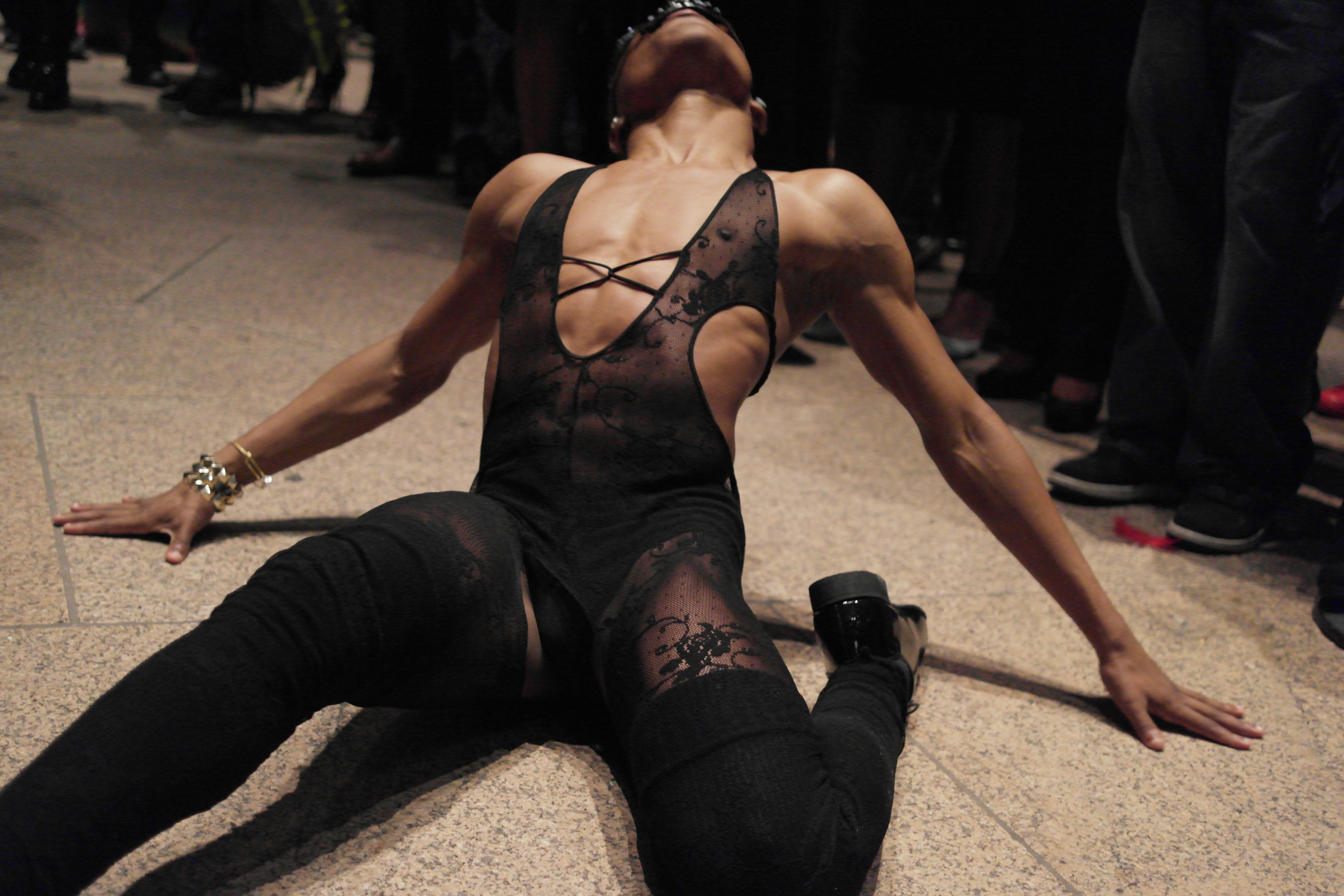

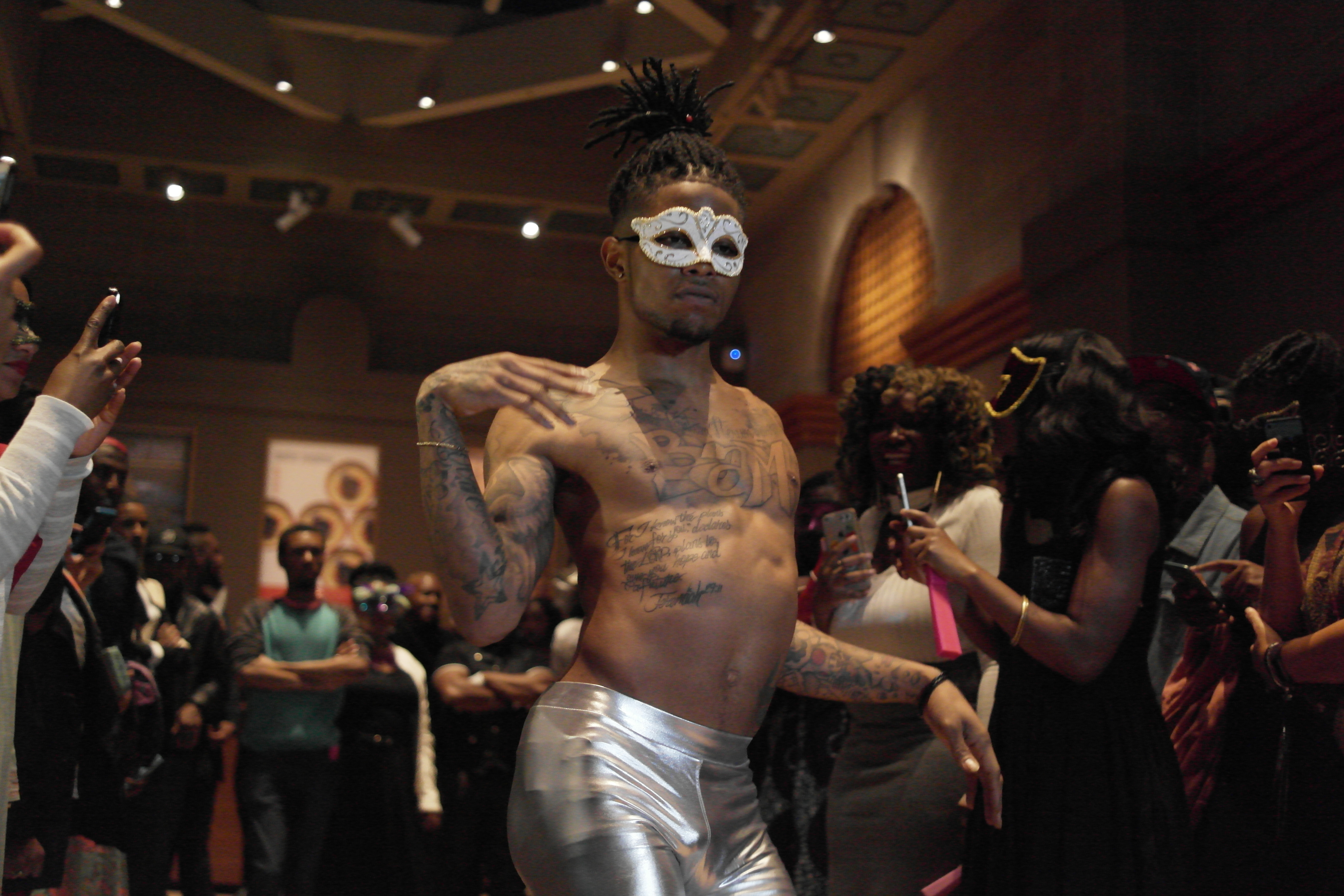

== Scenes and chapters ==
The ballroom scene has evolved into a national and international underground dancesport with major balls and dance competitions being held in different regions of the United States and around the world. New York State continues to be the mecca of the ballroom scene as well as the dance style, but regional voguing "capitals" exist—Chicago and Detroit for the Midwest. Atlanta, Charlotte, Dallas, Miami for the South. Los Angeles and Las Vegas for the West Coast. Baltimore, D.C, Connecticut, Philadelphia, Pittsburgh. and Virginia for the East Coast.

International cities in Western Europe (the U.K., France, Italy, the Netherlands, Belgium, Germany, Austria and Sweden), Eastern Europe, Latin America (Mexico, Brazil, Chile, Colombia, Costa Rica, Panama) and Asia Pacific (Japan and New Zealand) have sprouted and held competitions inspired by voguing from the original balls of New York City.

== Influence on pop music ==
"Cunt in a Box" (2006)
A ballroom/vogue track by Kevin Jz Prodigy

=== Influence on Madonna ===
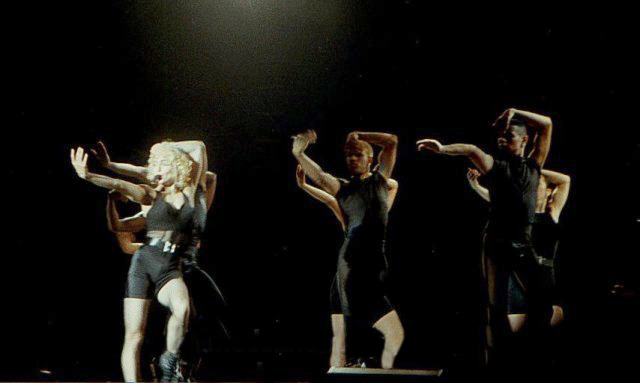
Madonna and her dancers vogueing on the 1990 Blond Ambition World Tour. The singer brought global exposure to the then-underground dance.

Madonna is commonly credited with popularizing vogue as a dance craze. Due to the popularity of her song "Vogue", Madonna has often been perceived as the inventor of vogueing, which nevertheless has not remained central to her performance work. MFA Stephen Ursprung from Smith College felt that "Madonna created a market for voguing" and further asserted "voguing has left its mark on the world" through a "close connection" with the singer.

Danish lecturer Henrik Vejlgaard, commented that both her song and video made "voguing a popular dance concept in many parts of the world". A 1994 article from academic journal Public Culture, said that the gay ball dance form was popularized by Madonna "in a way that made it seem like she practically invented it".

Although Madonna's song "Vogue" brought popularity and awareness to the dance style, the pop singer still received criticism from those who believe she exploited and appropriated the ballroom culture. The 1990 music video was choreographed by Jose Gutierez Xtravaganza and Luis Camacho of the House of Xtravaganza. However, all of the celebrities mentioned in the song are white, and Madonna herself is a white woman. Even though Madonna referenced the Harlem ballroom culture by including members of the community in the production of the video, critics still say that she erased the originating culture since she is the primary mainstream association with the style.

=== Further influence ===
Several other notable pop celebrities and artists have been influenced by voguing, including performers such as Teyana Taylor, Rihanna, Willow Smith, FKA Twigs, Ariana Grande, Beyoncé and Azealia Banks who have all taken inspiration from voguing from dances of past and contemporary voguers, while also incorporating the beats traditionally attached to the dance.

One of the most recent influences of voguing (and Ball culture) comes from the documentary film Kiki, in which contemporary Balls and Voguing is represented through the scenes and styles that now exist.

At the 2026 Milano-Cortina Winter Olympics in Italy, ice skaters Beaudry and Cizeron performed a program with Madonna's "Vogue" song including vogue dance inspired moves in the rhythm dance discipline.

== Depictions in media ==
- Deep in Vogue
- Paris Is Burning
- How Do I Look
- Pose
- Strike a Pose
- Legendary

== See also ==
- House of Aviance
- LGBT culture in New York City
- Waacking (dance)
- Willi Ninja

International:

- Swenkas, South Africa
