= List of LGBTQ-related films of 1990 =

This is a list of lesbian, gay, bisexual, transgender or queer-related films released in 1990. It contains theatrically released films that deal with important gay, lesbian, bisexual, transgender or queer characters or issues and may have same-sex romance or relationships as a plot device.

== Films ==
| Title | Director | Country | Genre | Cast | Notes |
|---|---|---|---|---|---|
| 100 Days Before the Command | Hussein Erkenov | Soviet Union | Drama | Vladimir Zamansky, Armen Dzhigarkhanyan | |
| The Ages of Lulu | Bigas Luna | Spain | Drama | Francesca Neri, Óscar Ladoire, María Barranco, Javier Bardem, Fernando Guillén Cuervo, Rosana Pastor, Juan Graell, Rodrigo Valverde, Pilar Bardem, Marta May, Gloria Rodriquez, Ángel Jovè, Ainara Pérez, Juan Sala and Pepa Serrano | a.k.a. Las edades de Lulú; based on the novel of the same name by Almudena Grandes |
| Europa Europa | Agnieszka Holland | Germany; France; Poland | War, drama | Marco Hofschneider, Julie Delpy, Hanns Zischler, René Hofschneider, Piotr Kozlowski, André Wilms, Robert Kellerman, Ashley Wanninger, Halina Łabonarska, Klaus Abramowsky, Michèle Gleizer, Marta Sandrowicz, Nathalie Schmidt, Delphine Forest, Martin Maria Blau, Andrzej Mastalerz and Solomon Perel | Based on Holocaust survivor Solomon Perel's autobiography I Was Hitler Youth Salomon, it has a gay subplot. |
| The Garden | Derek Jarman | United Kingdom; Germany | Drama | Tilda Swinton, Johnny Mills, Philip MacDonald, Pete Lee-Wilson, Spencer Leigh, Jody Graber, Roger Cook, Kevin Collins, Jack Birkett, Dawn Archibald, Milo Bell, Vernon Dobtcheff, Michael Gough, Mirabelle La Manchega and Jessica Martin | |
| The Handmaid's Tale | Volker Schlöndorff | United States | Drama | Natasha Richardson, Faye Dunaway, Aidan Quinn, Elizabeth McGovern | Based on the 1985 novel of the same name by Margaret Atwood. |
| Henry & June | Philip Kaufman | United States | Drama | Fred Ward, Uma Thurman, Maria de Medeiros, Richard E. Grant, Kevin Spacey, Jean-Philippe Ecoffey, Gary Oldman, Artus de Penguern, Liz Hasse, Brigitte Lahaie and Féodor Atkine | Based on the memoir/diary of the same name by Anaïs Nin |
| Miller's Crossing | Joel Coen | United States | Neo-noir, gangster | Gabriel Byrne, Marcia Gay Harden, John Turturro | |
| Paris Is Burning | Jennie Livingston | United States | Documentary | Dorian Corey, Pepper LaBeija, Venus Xtravaganza, Octavia St. Laurent, Willi Ninja, Angie Xtravaganza, Sol Pendavis, Freddie Pendavis, Junior Labeija and Paris Dupree | |
| The Party | Pierre Falardeau | Canada | Drama | Charlotte Laurier, Julien Poulin, Gildor Roy | a.k.a. Le Party; loosely based on the prison experiences of convicted Front de libération du Québec terrorist Francis Simard |
| Resident Alien | Jonathan Nossiter | United States | Documentary | Quentin Crisp, Sting, John Hurt, Holly Woodlawn, Fran Lebowitz and Michael Musto | |
| Robert's Movie | Canan Gerede | Turkey | Drama, psychology | Asli Altan, Patrick Bauchau and John Kelly | |
| Rock Hudson | John Nicolella | United States | Drama | Thomas Ian Griffith, Daphne Ashbrook, William R. Moses, Andrew Robinson, Thom Mathews, Michael Ensign, Diane Ladd, Joycelyn O'Brien, Don Galloway, Mathieu Carrière, Lawrence Dobkin (credited as Larry Dobkin), Jean Kasem, George Christy, John Shepard and Francis Guinan | TV movie; based on the autobiographical novel My Husband, Rock Hudson by Phyllis Gates |
| Singapore Sling | Nikos Nikolaidis | Greece | Drama | Meredyth Herold, Panos Thanassoulis and Michele Valley | |
| To Play or to Die | Frank Krom | Netherlands | Drama | Geert Hunaerts, Tjebbo Gerritsma | |
| Too Close for Comfort | Peg Campbell | Canada | Short docudrama | Stephen Fanning, Peter Stebbings | |
| Too Much Sun | Robert Downey Sr | United States | Comedy | Robert Downey Jr., Laura Ernst, Jim Haynie, Eric Idle, Ralph Macchio, Andrea Martin, Leo Rossi, Howard Duff | |
