= Hector Xtravaganza =

Dancer and activist

- Born: Hector Crespo; July 26, 1965; U.S.
- Died: December 30, 2018 (aged 53); New York City, U.S.
- Other names: Hector Extravaganza, Grandfather Hector Xtravaganza
- Occupations: Entertainer, Fashion Stylist

Hector Xtravaganza (né Hector Crespo) was a member of the House of Xtravaganza and well-known figure in the NYC ballroom life, entertainer, fashion stylist, and public advocate for HIV/AIDS and LGBTQ+ organizations.

== Early life ==
Born in Mayagüez, Puerto Rico, Hector L. Crespo moved to Jersey City, New Jersey, at the age of one. Raised by a single mother in Hudson County, he began socializing in Manhattan’s West Village during his early teens—an area historically recognized as the epicenter of New York City’s LGBTQ community. It was here that he began navigating his identity as a gay man. Following a period living in Hinesville, Georgia, with his mother, Hector chose to return to Jersey City to live with Tito Extravaganza and his family. However, his mid-to-late teens were marked by housing instability; by his own choice, he experienced homelessness and ultimately left school during the ninth grade. These early experiences with rejection and transience deeply influenced his adult perspectives, shaping his profound belief in the power of "chosen family the house of X Xtravaganza and self-created identity.

== Ballroom scene ==
Hector frequently socialized on the Christopher Street pier in the West Village area of New York City. The location was a popular gathering place for African American and Latino LGBTQ+ people, many of whom also participated in the underground ballroom scene. It was there that Hector first encountered the dance form known as Voguing which had emerged from ballroom culture, as well as met transgender women of color associated with the ballroom scene. In ballroom culture, Houses serve the dual role of teams in ballroom competition as well as providing surrogate families for LGBTQ+ members, many of whom had experienced rejection by their biological families and in broader society. Members of Houses traditionally take the house name as their surname (e.g., Willi Ninja) to denote their chosen family.

In 1982, Hector Crespo joined the newly formed House of Extravaganza (original spelling), founded by his friend Hector Valle. The House of Extravaganza was the first primarily Latin ballroom house in what had traditionally been an almost exclusively African American community. Angie Xtravaganza, a transgender woman of Puerto Rican heritage, took on the role of House Mother and became a close friend and confidant to Hector. In ballroom competition, Hector represented the House of Xtravaganza in various categories including “Face” and “Model's Effect,” where he quickly developed a reputation as a worthy runway competitor.

By the late 1980s, the underground ballroom scene began to garner mainstream attention in mainstream media. First with the song by Malcolm McLaren and the Bootzilla Orchestra called "Deep in Vogue" which sampled audio from the still unreleased film "Paris is Burning." Then culminated with Madonna's 1990 hit single and music video for "Vogue," inspired by the dance form created by the ballroom community, and the 1990 documentary film Paris Is Burning which made stars of several ballroom personalities who to that point had remained mostly unknown outside of the scene. The House of Xtravaganza and its members were closely associated with both Madonna's "Vogue" and Paris Is Burning; Hector Xtravaganza appeared in the runway competition scenes of the documentary film. The mainstream attention provided Hector the opportunity to work as a fashion stylist and designer for various popular music artists, including Lil’ Kim and Foxy Brown.

The deepening AIDS crisis of the early 1990s impacted the House of Xtravaganza and the broader ballroom scene. Hector himself was diagnosed as HIV-positive by 1985. Mother Angie Xtravaganza died from complication of AIDS in 1993. That same year, Hector assumed the role of House Father, a position he held until 2003. These experiences drove Hector to use his notoriety as a ballroom personality in support of HIV/AIDS awareness campaigns and projects.

During his tenure as House Father, Hector hosted numerous events for the ballroom community. He also developed a reputation as an advisor to other houses and younger members of the growing ballroom scene, which had begun to network to cities across the United States. By the mid-1990s, Hector legally changed his name to Hector Xtravaganza, further demonstrating his association with the House as his chosen surrogate family and his self-created identity. He was featured in the 1996 documentary film “Mirror, Mirror” and the 2006 documentary “How Do I Look” directed by Wolfgang Busch.

In 2004, Hector took the honorary title of House Grandfather, with former Madonna dancer and choreographer Jose Gutierez Xtravaganza taking the role of House Father. Hector had the words “Grandfather” and “Xtravaganza” tattooed on his forearms and frequently posed for photos displaying the inked title. In 2005, Hector Xtravaganza was inducted to the Ballroom Hall of Fame, an elite group of ballroom pioneers and icons. He was extensively interviewed for Chantal Regnault's Voguing & the Ballroom Scene 1989-92 (Soul Jazz books, 2011) and appeared in Legendary: Inside the House Ballroom Scene (Duke University Press, 2013) by Gerard H. Gaskin. He appeared in the Icona Pop music video for "All Night" along with other House of Xtravaganza members. In 2017, veteran television producer Ryan Murphy began working on a drama for the FX network set in the New York ballroom scene of the 1980s. To ensure an accurate depiction of ballroom culture of the period, several consultants were enlisted to assist on the show, including Hector Xtravaganza, Sol Pendavis, and Freddie Pendavis. The series Pose premiered on FX in June 2018.

== HIV/AIDS advocacy ==
The AIDS crisis of the late 1980s and early 1990s had a deep and personal impact on Hector. He was himself diagnosed as HIV-positive by 1985 and lost numerous friends and surrogate adopted family members to the virus. In response to the crisis, Hector committed to leveraging his ballroom notoriety and position within the House of Xtravaganza as an HIV/AIDS awareness advocate. In 1990, along with other members of the New York City's ballroom community, he founded the Gay Men's Health Crisis (GMHC) House of Latex project. The House of Latex serves as the outreach partner for the GMHC to members of the LGBTQ+ African American and Latino community of the ballroom scene. The GMHC Latex Ball is one of the largest annual events in the NYC LGBTQ+ community and a central activity in the organization's outreach programs serving young LGBTQ+ people of color.

In 1994, Hector, along with other members of the House of Xtravaganza, appeared as part of an HIV/AIDS awareness public service campaign sponsored by GMHC targeted to the LGBTQ+ people of color ballroom community of NYC. The campaign appeared in NYC subway stations throughout the city and helped to breakdown the stigma associated with HIV at a time before there were effective treatments.

GMHC named its Xcellence Award in honor of Hector Xtravaganza. Since 2007, the award has been presented annually to a member of the ballroom community for outstanding service in support of HIV/AIDS awareness.

In 2018, Hector Xtravaganza appeared in an HIV treatment awareness campaign sponsored by the NYC Department of Health. He was recognized by POZ magazine as one of the 2018 POZ 100 for his contributions to making a difference in the fight against HIV. On World AIDS Day 2018, Xtravaganza was presented with an award of recognition by City of New York Health Acting Commissioner Dr. Oxiris Barbot.

== Death ==
Hector Xtravaganza died of lymphoma in New York City on December 30, 2018. His death was widely covered in publications across the U.S., including Variety, Out, and The New York Times.

A memorial celebration of the life of Hector Xtravaganza was held on March 9, 2019 hosted by El Museo del Barrio. The Office of the Mayor of New York City officially proclaimed the day “Hector Xtravaganza Day” in the City of New York.

The Pose season 2 episode "Worth It" was dedicated to Xtravaganza's memory. He had served as a consultant for the show.

== See also ==
- LGBT culture in New York City
- List of LGBT people from New York City

== Notes ==
- BlackBook magazine, "This is Our House: The Resurgence of New York's Voguing Balls," Steven Lewis, October 15, 2009
- X., Karl, photographs by Alan-Joseph. XTRAVAGANZA. Get Out!, Issue #67/July 20, 2012
- https://www.thecut.com/2018/10/the-house-of-xtravaganza-at-35.html
- i-D
- https://aperture.org/blog/xtravaganza-ruiz-street/
- https://www.poz.com/article/2018-poz-100-sz
- https://aperture.org/blog/hector-xtravaganza/
- "Voguing Music" Tim Lawrence, "Voguing & the Ballroom Scene of New York City 1976-96," CD set insert, pg. 13 Soul Jazz Records, 2012
