= Xtravaganza =

Xtravaganza is an adopted surname. Notable people with the surname include:

- Angie Xtravaganza (1964–1993), American performer
- Carmen Xtravaganza (1961–2023), Spanish-born American model and singer
- Danni Xtravaganza (1961–1996), American performer
- Venus Xtravaganza (1965–1988), American transgender personality

== See also ==
- House of Xtravaganza
