= Chantal Regnault =

French photographer

Chantal Regnault is a French photographer. She is known for photographing the Harlem ballroom scene.

== Early life ==
Regnault was born in France. She left France for New York after the May 1968 uprisings. She later lived in Haiti until the 2010 earthquake caused her to leave.

== Education ==
Regnault studied literature before turning to photography. Once she began pursuing photography, she started out as a street photographer, capturing breakdancing and graffiti. Later, some of her ballroom subjects were Octavia St. Laurent, Pepper LaBeija, Freddie Pendavis, Angie Xtravaganza, Paris Dupree, and Dorian Corey.

== Career ==
Regnault began photographing the Harlem ballroom scene in the late 1980s; her themes were fashion, dance, and identity.

== Bibliography ==
- Voguing and the House Ballroom Scene of New York City 1989-92, Soul Jazz Books, 2011. ISBN 978-0955481765.

== See also ==
- LGBTQ culture in New York City
