= House of Xtravaganza =

New York City underground ballroom scene

Founded in 1982, the House of Xtravaganza is a "house" that emerged from the New York City underground ballroom scene. It is among the longest continuously active houses in the scene. House of Xtravaganza members and the collective group have been recognized for their cultural influence in the areas of dance, music, visual arts, nightlife, fashion, and community activism. House of Xtravaganza members have also been featured in popular media and have traveled internationally in connection with and as ambassadors for vogueing and ballroom culture.

== Ballroom Scene ==
Composed primarily of African American and Latino LGBTQ people, members of the ballroom community traditionally form "houses" which serve the dual purpose of providing a surrogate family structure and competing for trophies and prestige in community-organized balls. Houses are traditionally formed in a family-like structure, with a house "mother" and/or "father" who oversee and direct the group. In keeping with ballroom community tradition, members take the house name as their surname (e.g. "Jose Xtravaganza"). House members compete or "walk" in balls in various categories including representations of dance, fashion, costume design, runway modeling, and gender representation.

== 1982 to 1988: Founding and Formative Years ==
The House of Extravaganza (original spelling) was founded in 1982 by Hector Valle (1960–1985), a gay man of Puerto Rican descent, recognized for his elegant and athletic style of voguing. While Hector Valle was familiar with the ballroom scene, he himself did not belong to a ball house. In the summer of 1982 he made a bold decision for the time to create an all-Latino ballroom house, in response to what was a nearly exclusive African American gay subculture. Hector undertook the task of building up the House membership among friends he socialized with in the West Village of NYC and at popular nightclubs of the era, such as the Paradise Garage. One of the earliest members was a transgender teen of Puerto Rican descent who came to be known as Angie Xtravaganza. She assumed the role of "house mother". Mother Angie quickly emerged as the dominant leader and driver of the House.

In early 1983, the House of Xtravaganza made its first ballroom appearances. Although young and not widely experienced in ballroom competition, the desire to succeed captured the group numerous grand prize trophies in their first outings. Over the next few years, the House of Xtravaganza recruited talented young members, often drawn from the downtown gay discos and nightclubs of NYC. The outsider status as a Latino house within a primarily African American scene fostered a fierce family bond among the Xtravaganzas, and that closeness emerged a recognizable distinction from many of the other houses.

During this formative period, house mother Angie Xtravaganza felt that they had made their stand as an exclusively Latino group, and not wanting to exclude based solely on ethnicity, made the decision to open the house to all potential members regardless of ethnic background. The House of Xtravaganza ultimately included African American, Asian, and Caucasian members, although it remained true to its roots as a primarily Latino ball house.

In 1985 founder and house father Hector Valle died of complications from AIDS. Later that year Angie Xtravaganza recruited a young up-and-coming star of the ballroom scene named David Padilla to leave the rival House of Ebony and become the father of the House of Xtravaganza. David Padilla had admired what the House of Xtravaganza had accomplished in a relatively short period of time and being of Puerto Rican heritage felt a kinship to the primarily Latino house.

To celebrate the House's fifth anniversary, Father David and Mother Angie organized the 1987 Xtravaganza ball, held at the popular New York City nightclub Latin Quarter. It was one of the first balls to be held in a proper nightclub, as opposed to the social halls of Harlem which were the traditional venue for ballroom events. The House continued to promote balls for the community throughout the years, including many at the most popular and famous NYC nightclubs of the era, including Tracks, Sound Factory, Red Zone, Roxy, and XL.

Prominent members of the House of Extravaganza during this period recognized both within the ballroom community and as ambassadors of ballroom culture to the larger world include: Angie Xtravaganza, David Ian Xtravaganza, Danni Xtravaganza, Venus Xtravaganza, Carmen Xtravaganza, Bianca Xtravaganza, Hector Crespo Xtravaganza, Jose Gutierez Xtravaganza, and Vanessa Xtravaganza. The House was also known for its stable of "impossible beauties"; transgender women (known as "fem queens" in ballroom lingo) who reigned in the ballrooms and worked as professional models and entertainers.

== 1988 to 1994: Mainstream Recognition ==
By 1988 the ballroom scene had received attention from the press for its cultural significance. With the support of strong relationships built in the popular nightclubs of the period enabling a reach beyond the mostly closed ballroom community, the House of Xtravaganza was uniquely situated to take advantage of public interest in the ballroom scene. In 1988, Chi Chi Valenti, chronicler of downtown culture, featured the House of Xtravaganza in her landmark essay "Nations" for Details, with group and individual portraits by noted photographer Timothy Greenfield-Sanders.

The same year, members of the House of Xtravaganza were featured in the December 1988 issue of American Vogue with Naomi Campbell and other supermodels as well as the May 1989 issue of Time, and the September 1989 issue of Vanity Fair. Xtravaganzas were also featured in numerous other local and national publications as public interest in voguing and the ballroom scene continued to grow.

In 1989, the House of Xtravaganza participated in the Love Ball; an elaborate celebrity fundraiser organized by the Design Industry Foundation for AIDS which used the basic structure of the original balls as a template for the evening's festivities. Love Ball participants included designers Carolina Herrera and Thierry Mugler; supermodel Iman, artists Keith Haring, Francesco Clemente, and Julian Schnabel; and performance artist Leigh Bowery, among others. David Ian Xtravaganza was the Love Ball Master of Ceremonies. Several Xtravaganza members along with fashion retailer Barneys formed the one-night-only "House of Barneys", winning a trophy by artist Donald Baechler for the "God Bless This House" category.

Coko & Shady Louie Xtravaganza won the "Banjy Team" category trophy by artist Joseph Kosuth, Father David X. and Julie Jules X. won the "Wedding of the Year" category trophy designed by artist Kenny Scharf, and Jose Xtravaganza took the Voguing competition grand prize trophy created by Keith Haring—likely the most valuable ball trophy ever created. Of the event, Chi Chi Valenti later observed, "The Love Ball was simultaneously a massive coming-out party for the uptown ball culture and the end of a certain naivete that had been inherent in that culture. The Harlem balls never were quite the same again."

In the fall of 1989, the House of Extravaganza changed its name to "Xtravaganza". At this time the House and its members were quickly gaining notoriety outside of the ballroom scene and were frequently cited in the press. The X in the name has been interpreted as the Roman numeral for 10, representing the highest score given in ballroom competitions. Impresario Malcolm McLaren recorded one of the early vogue-specific records, "Deep In Vogue"; the introduction for the track calling out the House of Xtravaganza as one of the legendary New York voguing houses.

That same year David Ian Xtravaganza, along with DJ's and House members Johnny Dynell and David DePino, recorded the seminal single "Elements of Vogue". Its lyrics, recorded over a dance track sampled from popular voguing beats, provided a step-by-step introduction to the art and attitude of voguing. David Ian and Johnny Dynell, accompanied by other House members including Jose Gutierez and Luis Camacho, toured Japan in support of the record release – introducing voguing to an international audience. David Ian Xtravaganza assumed the position of "house father"; a position he held through 1993.

In 1990 the ballroom scene and voguing went mainstream. Jennie Livingston's award-winning documentary film Paris Is Burning chronicled the underground scene and made celebrities of some of the long-time stars of the ballroom scene, who to that point had remained mostly unknown to the larger public. Members of the House of Xtravaganza were the most frequently credited in the documentary. Among those featured in the movie are Venus Xtravaganza whose life and murder form a principal story arc for the film, and Angie Xtravaganza who is extensively interviewed in the film. Filmed from 1986 to 1989, the film features a very young Jose Gutierez Xtravaganza voguing in competition, foreshadowing his transition to professional dancer the same year as the film's release. Paris Is Burning was widely critically acclaimed and was the highest grossing documentary at the time of its release.

Madonna's 1990 hit single "Vogue" was based on the dance style developed in the ball scene. For the video and subsequent Blonde Ambition world tour, Madonna recruited two voguers from the House of Xtravaganza; Jose Gutierez and Luis Camacho. Madonna's "Vogue" went to #1 in 30 countries and was the best-selling single of 1990. The accompanying video, directed by David Fincher, featured choreography by Jose and Luis for which they were nominated for the 1990 MTV Video Music Award for Best Choreography in a Video.

In addition to touring with Madonna, they also appeared with her in the 1990 MTV Video Awards live broadcast of "Vogue", a "Rock The Vote" public service announcement, and the tour documentary "Madonna: Truth or Dare" (a.k.a. "In Bed with Madonna" outside of North America). Jose Gutierez Xtavaganza also appeared in Madonna's video for "Justify My Love ", as a model for Jean Paul Gaultier, and as a choreographer and dancer with other pop music artists. In 1993, under the name "Jose & Luis", the duo recorded "Queen's English" with Junior Vasquez for Madonna's Maverick label. The track featured background vocals by Madonna; the only record on which she is credited as a background vocalist.

Two additional tracks by Jose & Luis, "Do It to the Rhythm" and "You Want to Touch Me", appeared as part of Sire Records 1993 sampler "New Faces". Other Xtravaganza records from this period include "Just Like A Queen" by Ellis-D (an alias for Junior Vasquez) which included vocals by Coko Xtravaganza (1989) and "Love the Life You Live" by Danni Xtravaganza with Freddy Bastone (1990). David Ian Xtravaganza teamed with legendary NYC nightclub DJs and music producers Larry Levan (of the Paradise Garage) and Mark Kamins (of Danceteria) to record the 1991 single "Love's Gonna Get You", under the name East Village People featuring David Ian.

The deepening AIDS crisis of the early 1990s had significant impact on the House of Xtravaganza and the ballroom scene as a whole. Mother Angie Xtravaganza died of complications of AIDS in March 1993, after ten years of leading the House to ballroom and public recognition. Her death was the subject of the April 18, 1993 New York Times feature "Paris Has Burned", which included an oversized photograph of Angie on the front page of the Sunday Style section.

With the death of Mother Angie and several other long-time House members, the Xtravaganzas turned away from the public eye and returned to their roots in the underground ballroom scene. Danni Xtravaganza assumed the role of house mother following Angie's passing; a position he held until his own passing due to AIDS-related complications in 1996. David Ian Xtravaganza also died in 1996 from AIDS complications, having already passed the role of house father to Hector Crespo Xtravaganza in 1993.

During his tenure as house father, Hector Crespo X. was highly influential within the ballroom community, producing numerous events as well as providing counsel and leadership for a younger generation of ballroom participants from many different houses. In 1994 DJ / music producer and House supporter Junior Vasquez released a house music single simply titled "X" which bore a dedication to Angie Xtravaganza on the label; the record remains a popular club anthem today.

== 1994 to 2012: Ballroom Ambassadors and Community Activism ==
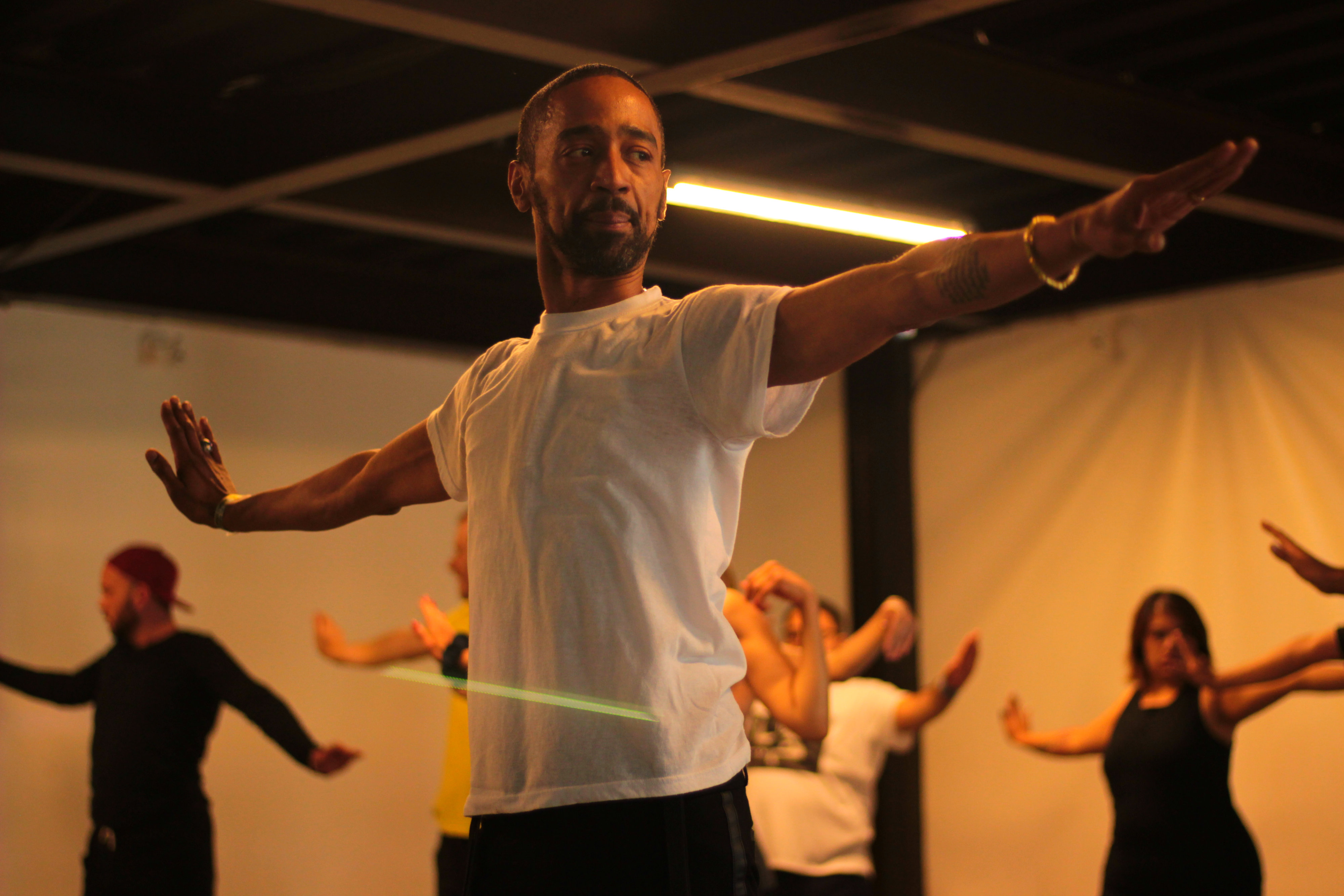
José Xtravaganza teaching a class, 2017

The loss of Mother Angie to AIDS at the young age of 28, along with the death of many other House members, prompted the Xtravaganzas to take a more visible role in the area of HIV/AIDS activism. Following these losses from the AIDS epidemic, hate-based violence, and other causes, the House of Xtravaganza remained active in the New York City ballroom scene, engaging in cultural and community activities. From 1994, this activism led to support and involvement in many HIV/AIDS benefits and organizations, often as featured performers or spokespersons, and remains a central activity for the House today. The well-established ballroom family continued to attract LGBTQ youth interested in membership, which is based on a number of criteria and is highly sought after in the local scene and among the Latino LGBTQ community.

Iconic voguer Jose Gutierez Xtravaganza (one of the youngest members of the original mid-1980s group) became house father in 2002, with past father Hector Crespo taking the honorary title of "house grandfather". Early House member and ballroom icon, Carmen Xtravaganza, served as mother of the house for various periods between 1998 and 2010; with other members holding the position in the interim. In 2009 longtime House member Coko Xtravaganza, an African American transgender woman, assumed the honorary role of "house grandmother".

Several House members were featured in the 2006 ballroom documentary "How Do I Look" directed by Wolfgang Busch. Seven members of the House of Xtravaganza have been inducted into the Ballroom Hall of Fame: Jose Gutierez Xtravaganza (voguer), Hector Crespo Xtravaganza (BQ face / ballroom culture), Carmen Xtravaganza (FQ realness, face), Derrick Xtravaganza (voguer), Luis Camacho Xtravaganza (voguer), Aldwana Morrison Xtravaganza (voguer), and Gisele Alicea Xtravaganza (FQ runway, trans-activist).

In 2006, the House of Xtravaganza as a whole was inducted into the Ballroom Hall of Fame, citing its contributions to ballroom culture. In 2017, founding Mother Angie Xtravaganza posthumously was awarded the Ballroom Hall of Fame Pioneer Award. HIV / AIDS organization Gay Men's Health Crisis (GMHC) named its House of Latex Xcellence Award in honor of Hector Xtravaganza. House members participate annually at the Life Ball AIDS benefit in Vienna — one of the bigger and more spectacular annual charity events in the world.

Author Arnaldo Cruz-Malave based his 2007 book "Queer Latino Testimonio – Keith Haring and Juanito Xtravaganza: Hard Tails" on a series of interviews with Juan Rivera Xtravaganza (1956 - 2011) about his life as a gay man coming of age in New York City and his long-term relationship with famed artist Keith Haring. In May 2013 the book was developed by the Pregones Theater, NYC as an original musical production entitled "Neon Baby". The musical adaptation centered heavily around the duality of Juan Rivera's relationships with his biological family and his adopted Xtravaganza family.

On May 12, 2012, Lorena Escalera Xtravaganza was found dead following a suspicious fire in her Brooklyn apartment. Twenty-five-year-old Lorena was one of the rising stars of the House of Xtravaganza known for her elaborate nightclub shows, having performed extensively throughout New York, Puerto Rico and Spain. The reporting of Lorena's death by the New York Times on May 13, 2012 outraged many in the LGBTQ community for sensationalizing her status as a trans woman. GLAAD and other LGBT organizations filed formal complaints against the New York Times for what they considered the disrespectful and bias tone of its news coverage. Following an investigation by the NYC Police and Fire Departments, her death was considered a homicide and the fire as arson. At this time her murder remains unsolved.

== 2012 to Present: Global Presence ==
In celebration of its 30th anniversary, the House of Xtravaganza hosted a ball in New York City on July 22, 2012; the event received wide media coverage. In his article published on the front page of the New York Times Style section, Jacob Bernstein wrote of the event, "Back in the 1980s, voguing and drag balls flourished in gay New York... But first came AIDS and then came hedge funds. And so the scene receded to the shadows, returning to smaller venues in Harlem and the South Bronx. But then last month, e-mail began to circulating with the news that the Xtravas were bringing the party to XL, a slicker-than-vinyl gay club near Times Square, in an attempt to widen the audience again. And judging by the turnout last Sunday at the House of Xtravaganza's 30th anniversary celebration, the effort has worked.".

In the fall of 2012 Jose Xtravaganza partnered with filmmaker Jason Last, known for his cutting-edge fashion work, to create the short film "VOGUE(ing). As Jason Last explained, "(Jose) came on board with one very specific request – that we create something special together and present Vogue(ing) in a new way, steering clear of the obvious first-degree references that otherwise would be deemed as simply syndicating what already was." Toward this end, The Black Soft recorded "The Ballad of Venus" (inspired by the life of Venus Xtravaganza) to which Jose Xtravaganza choreographed a fresh and contemporary work using the physical vocabulary and attitude of voguing.

Twenty-four years after House of Xtravaganza members first took voguing to Japan, they returned for a multi-page feature published in the January 2013 issue of Japan Vogue. Photographed by Terry Richardson with cover model Joan Smalls, the editorial titled "How to Vogue for Vogue" featured eight House members including former Madonna dancers/choreographers Father Jose Gutierez X and Luis Camacho X, as well as Ballroom Hall of Famer Derrick X. and several younger House members.

In September 2013 Swedish electro-pop duo ICONA POP released the music video "All Night" featuring Father Jose X., Derrick X., Gisele X., Jeremy X., Grandfather Hector X., and G Bizarre X., along with other ballroom personalities. The music video presented a mock ballroom battle. ICONA POP members Caroline Hjelt and Aino Jawo were inducted to the House of Xtravaganza as special members during the video filming.

An "interactive murder mystery" play titled The Murder of Venus Xtravaganza 1988 was presented by a New York City theater group in the fall of 2013. The show was loosely based on the actual murder of Venus, which had formed a principal story arc in the 1990 ballroom documentary "Paris Is Burning". The play offered a highly fictionalized account of the events and persons surrounding her death with audience members invited to "help solve the case". The House of Xtravaganza issued a formal press release stating they had no involvement with the production and withheld endorsement of the show. According to the press release the House of Xtravaganza considered the use of Venus' name as "inappropriate, opportunistic and disrespectful to Venus' legacy".

In January 2014, fashion retailer Barneys released a catalog and supporting campaign featuring 17 transgender men and women, including Gisele Xtravaganza photographed along with other House of Xtravaganza members. A professional print and runway model, Gisele Alicea Xtravaganza is a long-time member of the House and currently holding the position of House Mother and is a legendary figure in the ball scene. The campaign was shot by iconic photographer Bruce Weber. Entitled "Brother, Sisters, Sons & Daughters", the campaign included portfolios with photos of the models and their stories, along with a series of videos to coincide with the campaign. The campaign supported the National Center for Transgender Equality and the New York City Lesbian, Gay, Bisexual, and Transgender Community Center.

In celebration of its fifth anniversary, Candy magazine assembled 14 influential trans women to represent the ongoing social revolution in the attitudes toward transgender people. The cover feature and 62-page portfolio titled "The Role Models: The Glamorous Women of the Trans Revolution" with photographs by Mariano Vivanco, included two members of the House of Xtravaganza: Gisele Alicea Xtravaganza and Carmen Xtravaganza. Other influential figures included in the group were actress Laverne Cox, model Carmen Carrera, and writer Janet Mock.

The album Who's That Lady? by Koko Jones was released in October 2014 on the Motéma Music label. An accomplished percussionist and bandleader, trans activist, and long-time member of the House of Xtravaganza, Jones drew upon her life experiences in the creation of the album. The lead track on the album is "Xtravaganzas", her tribute to the history of the House, with lyrics such as "Mother Angie in the pages of Vogue, they taught Madonna how to strike a pose".

Former Madonna dancers and choreographers Jose Gutierez & Luis Camacho Xtravaganza are featured in the 2015 documentary Strike a Pose directed by Ester Gould and Reijer Zwaan. The film follows the lives of Madonna's Blond Ambition dancers 25 years later; the dancers sharing their own stories about life during and after the famed 1990 tour. The film premiered at the Berlin International Film Festival in February 2016 to positive reviews. It is scheduled for screening at several international film festivals in the coming months, before being released for broader distribution.

For the 2016 original Netflix series The Get Down, the House of Xtravaganza partnered with the director Baz Luhrmann in the creation of a scene set a late 1970s New York City LGBTQ nightclub. The scene appears as part of Episode 6 and features a runway vogue battle choreographed by Father Jose Gutierez Xtravaganza with House of Xtravaganza voguers and a drag performance by Mother Gisele Alicea Xtravaganza.

For Katy Perry's musical guest performance on Saturday Night Live in May 2017, she enlisted several members of the House of Xtravaganza to perform alongside her including Father Jose Gutierez X., Mother Gisele Alicea X., Jimmy X., Michael X., Joseph X. and a newly recruited Indya Moore X. The group performed with Perry in both "Swish Swish" and "Bon Appetit" musical numbers.

Bloomingdale's celebrated 2017 LGBT Pride with a performance in the windows of its flagship department store; the voguing and runway performance featured Father Jose Gutierez X., Mother Gisele Alicea X., Grandfather Hector X., Derrick X. and G Bizarre X., and other ballroom personalities.

Feature film Saturday Church told the story of a 14-year-old boy struggling with gender identity and religion, who begins to use fantasy to escape his life in the inner city. Released in January 2018, the cast featured Indya Moore X. and Alexia Garcia X. The film was well-received by critics and holds an aggregated score of 92% on Rotten Tomatoes.

In 2017, veteran television producer Ryan Murphy began working on a drama for the FX network that set in the New York ballroom scene of the 1980s. To ensure an accurate depiction of ballroom culture of the period, several consultants were enlisted including Grandfather Hector Xtravaganza. The series Pose premiered on the FX network in June 2018. Indya Moore X. was cast as lead character "Angel" and Alexia Garcia as the featured character "Aphrodite". Grandfather Hector X., Father Jose Gutierez X, Mother Gisele Alicea X, Dominique Silver X., Nomi X., G Bizarre X., and other House of Xtravaganza members also appeared in first-season episodes.

In June 2018, original Madonna "Vogue" dancers and choreographers Father Jose Gutierez X. and Luis Camacho X. were honored as Celebrity Grand Marshalls of 2018 San Francisco Pride parade.

The House of Xtravaganza has continued in its role of ambassador to the ballroom scene. As ballroom culture has expanded globally, the House has designated a small and select group of members in Europe, Asia, and South America to represent Xtravaganza in those regions, while NYC remains the center of the House's structure and membership.

More than 35 years after its founding, House of Xtravaganza members continue to be featured in popular media and travel the world as ambassadors of voguing and the ballroom scene.

== House Mothers and Fathers ==
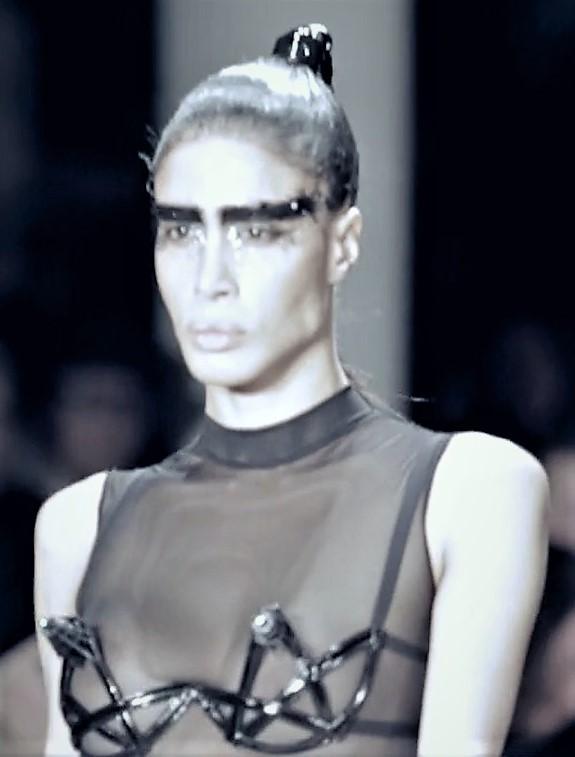
Gisele Xtravaganza at the Chromat Autumn-Winter 2015 runway show

In keeping with ballroom community tradition, the House of Xtravaganza is structured in a family-like hierarchy, with a house "mother" and "father" who oversee and direct the group.

| House Mother | Tenure | Note |
|---|---|---|
| Angie Xtravaganza | 1983-1993 | Founding House Mother |
| Danni Xtravaganza | 1993-1996 | |
| Raquel Xtravaganza | 1996-1997 | |
| Carmen Xtravaganza | 1997-2003 – 2008-2015 | |
| Gisele Alicea Xtravaganza | 2003-2008 – 2015-Present | |

| House Father | Tenure | Note |
|---|---|---|
| Hector Valle (E)Xtravaganza | 1982-1984 | House Founder |
| Michael (E)Xtravaganza | 1984 | Interim House Father |
| David Padilla Xtravaganza | 1985-1991 | |
| David Ian Xtravaganza | 1991-1993 | |
| Louie 'Shady' Xtravaganza | 1993 | Interim House Father |
| Hector Crespo Xtravaganza | 1993-1997 – 1999-2003 | Honorary title of 'Grandfather' after 2003 |
| Scorpio Xtravaganza | 1998 | |
| Jose Gutierez Xtravaganza | 2003–Present | |

Current House Mother Gisele Alicea, a.k.a. Gisele Xtravaganza, is an actress and runway fashion model. Alicea has worked with numerous photographers, including Terry Richardson, Bruce Weber, Mariano Vivanco, Patrick Demarchelier, and Danielle Levitt.

== Notes ==
- BlackBook magazine, "This is Our House: The Resurgence of New York's Voguing Balls", Steven Lewis, October 15, 2009
- Spank Zine magazine - Issue #14, House of Xtravaganza portraits, David Bechtel photographer, 2009
- 'Strictly Ballroom: After Decades in the Shadow of Vogue Dancing and Culture, Ballroom Beats Come to the Fore', Marke B, xlr8r.com
- "House and Ball Culture Goes Wide", Gay & Lesbian Review Worldwide, 17, 5, September/October 2010, 28-30, by Ivan Monforte
- BlackBook Magazine; "My Experience at the 21st Annual Latex Ball", Steve Lewis, August 22, 2011
- "Voguing Music"' Tim Lawrence, "Voguing & the Ballroom Scene of New York City 1976 - 96", CD set insert, pg. 13' Soul Jazz Records, 2012
- Gaskin, Gerard; "Legendary: Inside the House Ballroom Scene", Duke University Press, 2013
