= Jose Gutierez Xtravaganza =

American dancer, choreographer and recording artist from the New York ballroom scene

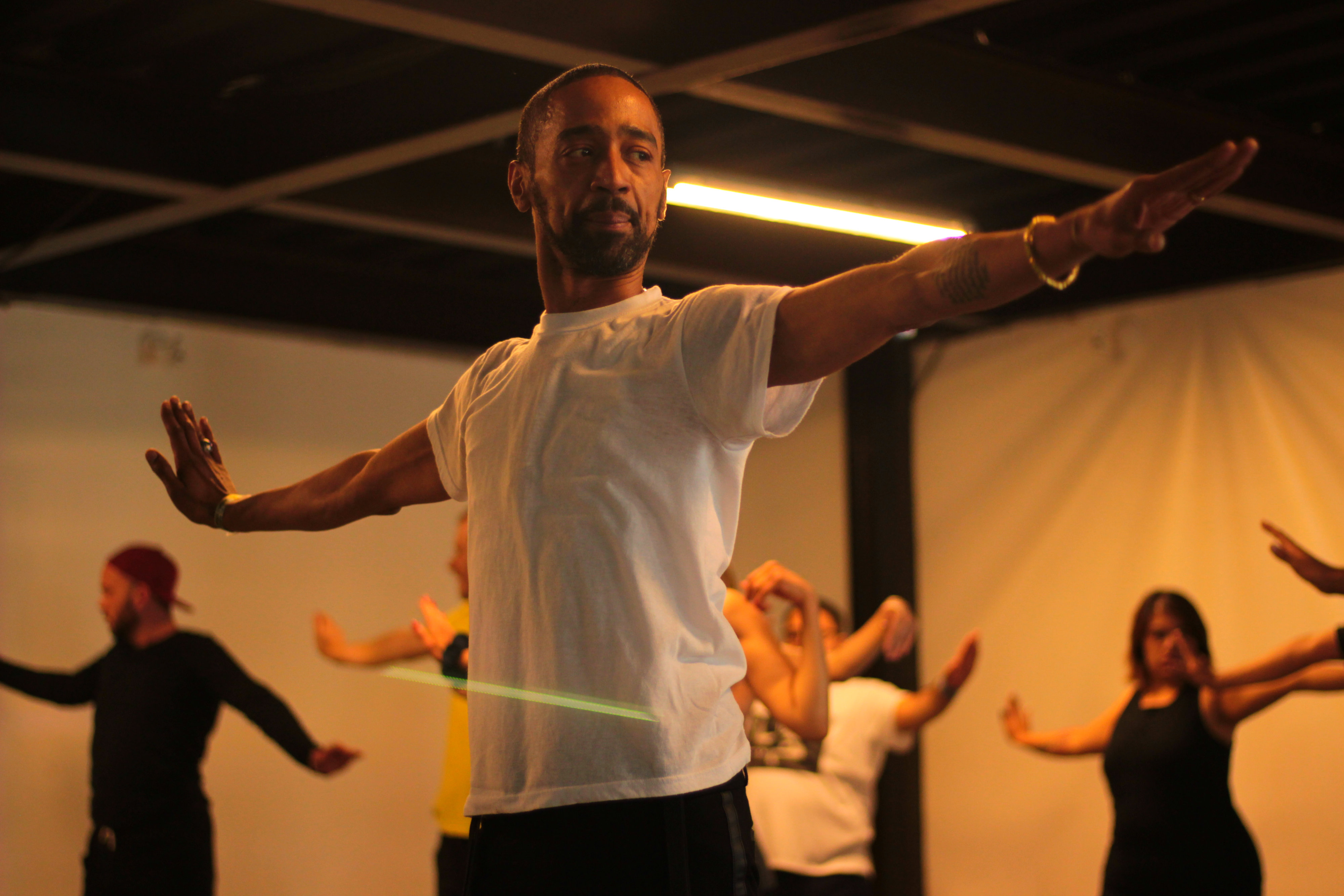
- Xtravaganza in 2017
- Born: José Gutiérrez; New York City, New York, United States
- Education: Fiorello H. LaGuardia High School of Music & Art and Performing Arts
- Occupations: Dancer, choreographer, recording artist

Jose Gutierez Xtravaganza (né José Gutiérrez, sometimes called Jose Xtravaganza) is a dancer, choreographer, and recording artist. He is one of the most widely recognized personalities to emerge from the NYC ballroom scene of the 1980s. He is best known for his work with Madonna.

== Early life ==
José Gutiérrez was born and raised on the Lower East Side of Manhattan, his parents having emigrated from the Dominican Republic. As a child he was recognized for his natural dance ability and enrolled in a program of formal dance education, sponsored through the New York City Department of Education. He continued his study of ballet and other dance styles throughout his teenage years, going on to attend the Fiorello H. LaGuardia High School of Music & Art and Performing Arts and studying under master choreographer Eliot Feld.

== Voguing and ballroom scene ==
While in high school, Jose began to socialize among the Latino and African American LGBTQ community that regularly gathered along the West Side waterfront of New York City's West Village area, commonly known as "the piers". It was there that he first became aware of the gestural vocabulary and projected attitude of voguing. The dance style first emerged as part of the NYC underground ballroom scene, in which the dancers transition through a series of poses that emulate those of fashion models. Much like break dancing (which developed concurrently), there is an inherent competitive aspect to voguing in which the dancers try to outdo one another through increasingly complex poses and the fluidity of their transition between poses. The underground ball scene and voguing would later be popularized through the 1990 documentary Paris Is Burning, in which Jose appears voguing in competition.

As a formally trained dancer, Jose became fascinated with the expressive and gestural dance style, quickly picking up the moves and integrating them with the more formal positions of ballet. As a teenager, Jose began attending and competing in balls hosted by the New York City "houses", where the best voguers gathered to battle on the runway for prizes and recognition. It was there that he came to the attention of mother Angie Xtravaganza, matriarch of the ballroom House of Xtravaganza and was invited to become a member of the group. Consistent with the tradition of ball culture, Jose took the house name as his adopted surname in 1986. Leveraging his formal dance training, Jose developed a unique style of voguing based on clean lines, precision poses, and effortless transitions, with a projection of disciplined elegance. This combination made Jose a respected opponent in ballroom competitions, garnering him numerous trophies and awards.

Public interest in the ballroom scene began to grow in the late 1980s, providing Jose the opportunity to showcase his talents to a broader audience. In 1988 he appeared in Details magazine, photographed by Timothy Greenfield-Sanders for an essay by Chi Chi Valenti about the House of Xtravaganza. He also appeared in the December 1988 issue of American Vogue magazine alongside Naomi Campbell and other models, the May 1989 issue of Time magazine, and other local and national publications. In 1989 he participated in the Love Ball, an elaborate celebrity fundraiser organized by the Design Industry Foundation for AIDS that used the basic structure of the original balls as a template for the evening's festivities. Love Ball participants included designers Carolina Herrera and Thierry Mugler; supermodel Iman; artists Keith Haring, Francesco Clemente, and Julian Schnabel; and performance artist Leigh Bowery, among others. Jose Xtravaganza took the Voguing competition grand prize trophy created by Keith Haring, likely the most valuable ball trophy ever created. That same year, Jose and other House of Xtravaganza members toured Japan, introducing voguing to an international audience. In collaboration with GMHC, Jose appeared in a safe sex public service announcement geared toward the ballroom community. In subsequent years, Jose and the House of Xtravaganza frequently lent their talents in support of organizations related to the LGBT community.

In 1990 the ballroom scene and voguing began to enter the mainstream. Jennie Livingston's award-winning documentary film Paris Is Burning chronicled the underground scene and made celebrities some of the long-time stars of the ballroom scene, who to that point had remained mostly unknown to the larger public. Filmed between 1986 and 1989, the film captures a very young Jose Gutierez Xtravaganza voguing in competition, foreshadowing his transition to professional dancer the same year as the film's release.

== Career ==
Madonna's 1990 hit single "Vogue" was based on the dance style developed in the ball scene. For the video and subsequent Blond Ambition world tour, Madonna worked with Jose Gutierez Xtravaganza and Luis Camacho Xtravaganza. Madonna's "Vogue" would go to #1 in thirty countries and was the best selling single of 1990. The accompanying video, directed by David Fincher, featured choreography by Jose and Luis, for which they were nominated for the 1990 MTV Video Music Award for Best Choreography in a Video. In addition to touring with Madonna, they also appeared with her in the 1990 MTV Video Awards live performance of "Vogue", a "Rock The Vote" public service announcement, and the behind the scenes tour documentary Madonna: Truth or Dare (known as In Bed with Madonna outside of North America). Jose Gutierez Xtravaganza also appeared in Madonna's music video "Justify My Love", and modeled for Jean Paul Gaultier. His collaborations with Madonna continued throughout the mid-1990s.

During this period Jose also worked as a dancer and choreographer for artists as diverse as Lisa Lisa and Cult Jam and Tony Bennett.

He appeared in the 1991 Peter Lindbergh project Models: The Film alongside Linda Evangelista, Cindy Crawford, Stephanie Seymour,Tatjana Patitz and Naomi Campbell.

In 1993, as half of the duo Jose & Luis, he recorded "Queen's English" with dance partner Luis Camacho Xtravaganza and music producer Junior Vasquez. Released by Sire / Warner Brothers records, the track featured background vocals by Madonna, the only record on which she is credited as a background vocalist. Two additional tracks by Jose & Luis, "Do It To the Rhythm" and "You Want To Touch Me", appeared as part of Sire Records 1993 sampler "New Faces".

With a deep commitment to the House of Xtravaganza, Jose ascended to the position of House Father in 2002. In this role of House Father, Jose took on the responsibility of leading the House in all public activities, both in and out of the ballrooms. That same year he was inducted to the Ballroom Hall of Fame, citing his contribution in helping to creating mainstream awareness of voguing and as a global ambassador of the ballroom scene. As House Father, Jose would produce several successful balls at high-profile NYC nightclubs, attracting a wide range of NYC's cultural elite in addition to members of the ballroom community.

In the fall of 2012, Jose Xtravaganza partnered with filmmaker Jason Last, known for his cutting-edge fashion work, to create the short film VOGUE(ing). As Jason Last explained, "(Jose) came on board with one very specific request – that we create something special together and present Vogue(ing) in a new way, steering clear of the obvious first degree references that would otherwise be deemed as simply syndicating what already was." Toward this end, The Black Soft recorded "The Ballad of Venus" (inspired by the life of Venus Xtravaganza) to which Jose Xtravaganza choreographed a fresh and contemporary work using the physical vocabulary and attitude of voguing.

Twenty-four years after House of Xtravaganza members first took voguing to Japan, they returned for a multi-page feature published in the January 2013 issue of Vogue Japan. Photographed by Terry Richardson with cover supermodel Joan Smalls, the editorial titled "How to Vogue for Vogue" featured eight House members including former Madonna dancers/choreographers Father Jose Gutierez X and Luis Camacho X.

In September 2013, Swedish electro-pop duo ICONA POP released the music video "All Night" featuring Father Jose X along with other ballroom personalities.

In January 2014, luxury fashion retailer Barneys released a catalog and supporting campaign in support of transgender men and women. The campaign was created by noted photographer and filmmaker Bruce Weber. Father Jose and other House of Xtravaganza members were heavily featured as part of the campaign which supported the National Center for Transgender Equality and the New York City Lesbian, Gay, Bisexual, and Transgender Community Center.

For the 2015 twenty-fifth anniversary of the original release of Madonna's Vogue, Jose reunited with fellow Blond Ambition dancer Salim "Slam" Gauwloos for a video tribute broadcast on MTV.

Gutierez is featured in the 2015 documentary Strike a Pose directed by Ester Gould and Reijer Zwaan. The film follows the lives of Madonna's Blond Ambition dancers 25 years later, the dancers sharing their own stories about life during and after the famed 1990 tour. The film premiered at the Berlin International Film Festival in February 2016 to positive reviews. The film was screening at numerous international film festivals before being released for broader distribution.

He appeared in the 2016 short form documentary film “WALK!”, commenting on the history and development of the ballroom scene over the past 30 years.

For the Baz Luhrmann-created television series The Get Down, Jose served as a dance coach as well as appearing in the series. The musical drama series, set in the South Bronx of the 1970s against a backdrop of disco and the birth of hip hop, was released by Netflix in summer 2016.

In 2018 Jose was cast in a supporting role in the fictionalized representation of the New York ball scene in the television series Pose. As of 2021 he continues his relationship with the series through its third season.

Gutierez, along with his longtime dance/choreography partner Luis Camacho, was a Celebrity Grand Marshal for the 2018 San Francisco PRIDE Parade.

Jose appeared in three episodes of the 2018 National Geographic television documentary series “The ‘90s Greatest”, commenting on Madonna’s groundbreaking 1990 Blond Ambition Tour, as well as pop and dance culture of the period.

Jose Guiterez Xtravaganza continues to work professionally as a choreographer and dance instructor, travels internationally as an ambassador of the ballroom scene, and maintains the role of Father of the House of Xtravaganza.

== See also ==
- LGBT culture in New York City
