= Willi Ninja =

American dancer and choreographer (1961–2006)

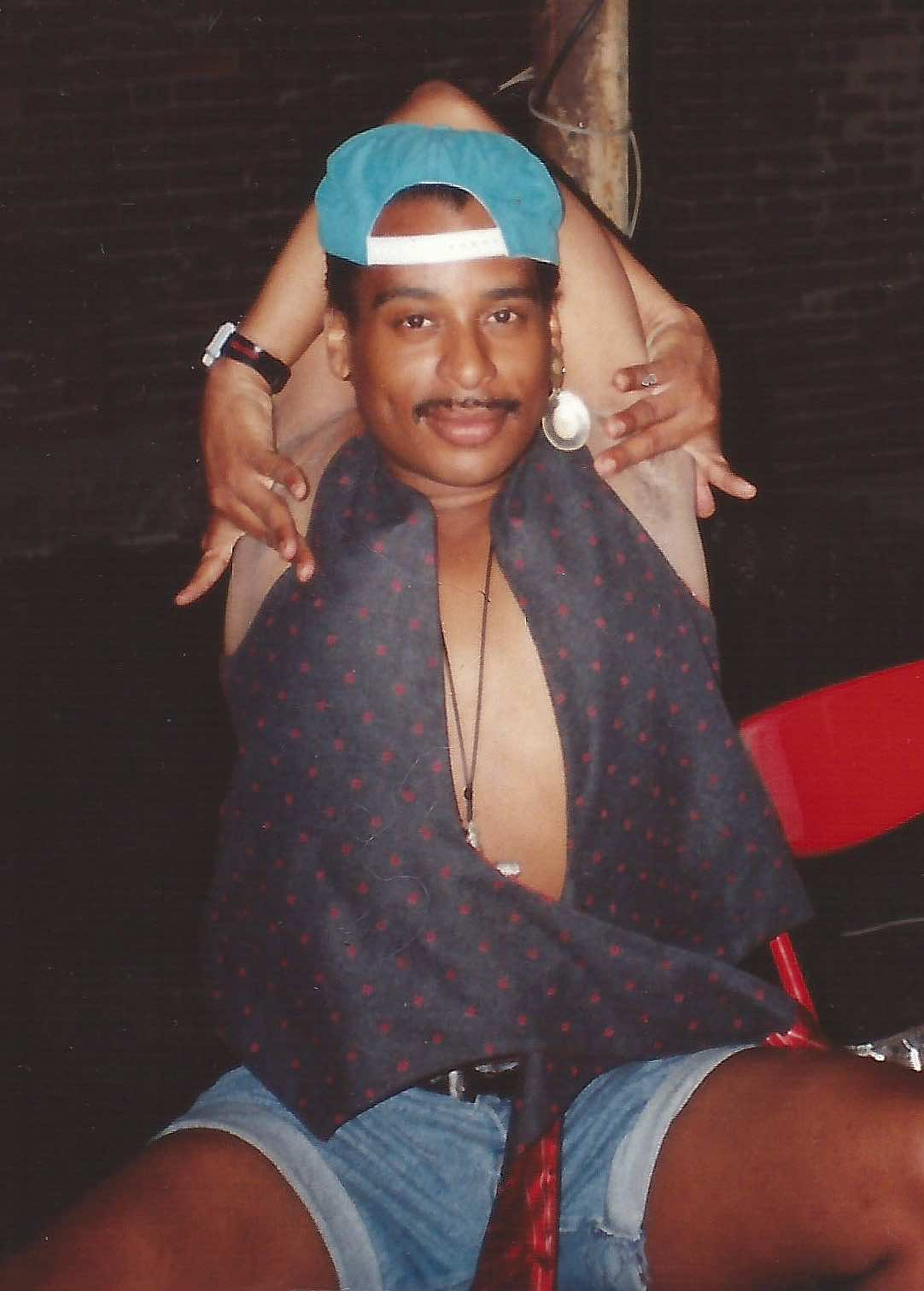
- Ninja in 1994
- Born: William Roscoe Leake; April 12, 1961; New Hyde Park, New York, U.S.
- Died: September 2, 2006 (aged 45); New York City, U.S.
- Occupations: Dancer; choreographer

William Roscoe Leake (April 12, 1961 – September 2, 2006), better known as Willi Ninja, was an American dancer and choreographer known for his appearance in the documentary film Paris Is Burning.

Ninja specialized in voguing and was a fixture of ball culture at Harlem's drag balls who took inspiration from sources as far-flung as Fred Astaire and the world of haute couture to develop a style of dance and movement. He caught the attention of Paris Is Burning director Jennie Livingston. The film served as a springboard for Ninja. He parlayed his appearance into performances with a number of dance troupes and choreography gigs.

In 1989, Ninja starred in the music video for Malcolm McLaren's song "Deep in Vogue", which sampled the then-unfinished movie.

Ninja was a member of the LGBT community who died of AIDS complications in 2006.

== Early life ==
Born at Long Island Jewish Medical Center in New Hyde Park, New York, Willi was a self-taught dancer and was perfecting his voguing style by his twenties. Willi was born to a black mother and was of mixed racial ancestry, claiming to have Irish, Cherokee, and Asian ancestors. It was from fellow voguers in Washington Square Park that Jennie Livingston first heard his name. While he did not create the form, he worked at refining it with clean, sharp movements to "an amazing level". His influences included Kemetic hieroglyphics, young Michael Jackson, Fred Astaire, Olympic gymnasts, and Asian culture.

== Career ==
He participated in Harlem's drag balls with "children" from his House of Ninja. Like other ball houses, the House of Ninja was a combination of extended social family and dance troupe, with Ninja as its Mother. He taught his children late into the night on the old Christopher Street pier and at the underground clubs.

Ninja was a featured dancer in many music videos including Malcolm McLaren's "Deep in Vogue" and "I Can't Get No Sleep" by Masters At Work featuring India. In 1994, he released his single "Hot" (another Masters At Work production) on Nervous Records. Ninja's later career included runway modeling for Jean-Paul Gaultier, performing with dance companies under Karole Armitage, and providing instruction to Paris Hilton on perfecting her walk. He opened a modeling agency, Elements of Ninja, in 2004, and made an appearance on Jimmy Kimmel Live!. Ninja was also prominently featured in the 1990 documentary Paris is Burning and the 2006 documentary release How Do I Look, directed by Wolfgang Busch.

Ninja also danced in two of Janet Jackson's videos from her album Rhythm Nation 1814, one of which was "Alright", whose remix featured late rap star Heavy D and cameo appearances by Cab Calloway, Cyd Charisse, and The Nicholas Brothers. He also was featured in "Escapade".

Ninja worked hard to care for his mother, Esther Leake, who had Parkinson's and used a wheelchair. Her trips with Ninja to the ballet and the Apollo were inspiration for his later endeavors in dance.

=== House of Ninja ===
Ninja started the House of Ninja in 1982, despite not having been part of a house previously or winning three grand prizes, which was generally seen as a requirement to start a house. The name Ninja came from the house's Asian and martial arts influences, coupled with the fact that people in the ballroom scene did not know who they were. The House of Ninja had a reputation for being multiracial. Except for the Latino House of Xtravaganza, most houses at the time were African-American.

== In film ==
Ninja starred in a handful of films and television series. On August 8, 1991, he was a guest on The Joan Rivers Show alongside some of his Paris Is Burning cast members, such as Dorian Corey and Pepper LaBeija. Jennie Livingston also starred. In the episode, the cast talked about the docufilm and encouraged audience members to "walk" as if a participant at a Drag Ball. In the same year, Ninja starred in the Marlon Riggs 9-minute short Anthem as a dancer. Ninja also appeared posthumously in 2012 documentary, Check Your Body at the Door.

== Death and legacy ==
Ninja died of AIDS-related heart failure in New York City on September 2, 2006.

Since his death, he has been a figure in art and music DJs. Ninja is also a figure in LGBTQ studies, gender studies, and performance studies for his nonconforming and transgressive gender expression as an artist.

Ninja was honored in a Google Doodle on June 9, 2023.

== See also ==
- LGBT culture in New York City
- List of LGBT people from New York City
- NYC Pride March
