= Carmen Xtravaganza =

Spanish-American model and singer (1961–2023)

- Born: 9 April 1961; Rota, Andalusia, Spain
- Died: 4 August 2023 (aged 62); United States
- Other name: Carmen St. Laurent
- Occupations: Dancer, model, performer

Carmen Inmaculada Ruiz (9 April 1961 – 4 August 2023), known as Carmen Xtravaganza and formerly as Carmen St. Laurent, was a Spanish-born American model and singer. A house mother of the House of Xtravaganza, she was featured in the 1990 documentary film Paris Is Burning.

== Biography ==
=== First years and ballroom scene ===
Xtravaganza was born in 1961 to a Spanish mother and an African American father in Rota, Andalusia, Spain, the location of the United States' Rota naval base. She later shared having first expressed her wish to transition when she was five years old, and began formally taking hormones at the age of 16, by which time she was living in Washington, D.C., in the United States. At age 18, Xtravaganza underwent sex reassignment surgery.

By 1981, Xtravaganza was living in the Meatpacking District in New York City, where she worked as a prostitute. During this time, she first started attending the city's ballroom scene, performing with the House of St. Laurent. In 1985, Xtravaganza won a ball organized by the House of Omni, and subsequently joined the House of Xtravaganza after receiving the approval of the house's mother, Angie Xtravaganza. In 1988, Xtravaganza was featured in "Venus Envy: The Drag Balls of Harlem"; the article, published in The Village Voice, was the first time ballroom culture appeared in the mainstream American press. In 1990, Xtravaganza was featured in the 1990 documentary film Paris is Burning, which followed New York City's ballroom culture during the 1980s, in a scene discussing her transition with her house sister, Brooke Xtravaganza.

=== Return to Spain ===
Following the film's release, Xtravaganza returned to Spain, where she became a feature of the nightclub scene and established a Spanish chapter of the House of Xtravaganza. While in Europe, she appeared in the TV movie God Save the Queens in 1995 discussing drag and club culture, and appeared shortly in the spanish action movie airbag(1997), before later returning to the United States in 1997. By this time, Angie Xtravaganza had died; prior to her death she had identified Carmen Xtravaganza as her preferred successor. Xtravaganza served as the house mother on and off until 2015.

In 1999, Xtravaganza was inducted into the Ballroom Hall of Fame. Xtravaganza appeared in the 2006 documentary How Do I Look, which looked into American ball culture.

=== Homages and death ===
In 2014, Xtravaganza appeared on the cover of the 5th anniversary of magazine C☆NDY together with 13 other trans women: Janet Mock, Carmen Carrera, Geena Rocero, Isis King, Gisele Alicea, Leyna Ramous, Dina Marie, Nina Poon, Juliana Huxtable, Niki M'nray, Peche Di, Yasmine Petty, and Laverne Cox.

In 2022, her hometown of Rota named Xtravaganza as the godmother of its local celebrations marking International LGBT Pride Day.

In September 2022, Minx Xtravaganza started a GoFundMe for Carmen Xtravaganza after the latter was diagnosed with lung cancer. In July 2023, Carmen Xtravaganza posted on Facebook that chemotherapy had been unsuccessful. She died of lung cancer the following month, on 4 August 2023, at age 62.
