= Deep in Vogue =

Single by Malcolm McLaren

from the album Waltz Darling
- A-side: "Waltz Darling"
- Released: 12 May 1989
- Recorded: 1989
- Genre: House; dance
- Length: 4:03
- Label: Epic
- Songwriters: David LeBolt; Malcolm McLaren
- Producers: David LeBolt; Malcolm McLaren; William Orbit; Mark Moore

Malcolm McLaren singles chronology
"Something's Jumpin' in Your Shirt" (1989)	"Deep in Vogue" (1989)	"House of the Blue Danube" (1990)

"Deep in Vogue" is a 1989 dance single by Malcolm McLaren and the Bootzilla Orchestra featuring Lourdes Maria Morales and Willie Ninja, with additional production and remix by Mark Moore and William Orbit, sampling the 1973 MFSB song "Love is the Message."

The song was released as the third single from McLaren's fourth studio album, Waltz Darling (1989). McLaren was so impressed with the Moore and Orbit version that he scrapped his original recording and used the Moore/Orbit remix (in a shortened form with a spoken intro by McLaren and some other parts not found on the 12 inch) for the Waltz Darling album. The 12-inch mix is subtitled 'Banjie Realness' (although the correct spelling generally used is 'Banjee').

== Background ==
Mark Moore used to hang out in Malcolm McLaren and Vivienne Westwood's shop Seditionaries as a 14-year-old punk rocker. Years later, after Moore hit the number one spot with his single "Theme from S'Express", Malcolm McLaren contacted him to ask him to remix a few tracks. Moore asked his friend William Orbit to join him on the mix and the two of them set about sampling the voguing section of the Harlem ball culture documentary movie Paris Is Burning, which McLaren had casually given them. The film was unreleased at the time but McLaren had brought a VHS tape of rushes with him along with permission from director Jennie Livingston to sample it. McLaren then introduced Moore and Orbit to the New York voguing scene which had captured his imagination. Willi Ninja also made the trip over to London to record vocals.

The film and record depicted the underground dance and ball scene of the gay, African-American and Latino voguing houses in New York City during the 1980s. McLaren's record was released two years before the film's official release, and was the first to bring 'voguing' to mainstream public attention – it pre-dates Madonna's "Vogue" and topped the Billboard dance chart in July 1989, eight months before the March 1990 release of Madonna's single. The film is now a cult classic.

== Commercial performance ==
The single was McLaren's fourth entry on the Billboard Dance Play chart and his only number one. "Deep in Vogue" was number one on that chart for one week in July 1989. The single additionally charted at #83 in the UK, and #107 in Australia.

"Deep in Vogue" was originally released in the UK and Europe as the B-side to the "Waltz Darling" single and credited to Malcolm McLaren and the Bootzilla Orchestra in 1989. The record was then re-released in Europe in 1990 (after it went to number one on the U.S. Billboard Dance Chart and after Madonna's "Vogue" became a hit) and credited to Malcolm McLaren and the House of McLaren. A rare ambient mix of "Deep in Vogue" by Orbit & Moore is available only on the 1990 CD single and DJ Promo titled 'Opulence – You Own Everything'.

== Personnel ==
- David LeBolt – writing and production
- Malcolm McLaren – writing and production
- Phil Ramone – production
- Mark Moore – additional production and remix
- William Orbit – additional production and remix
- Lourdes – lead vocals
- Willie Ninja – rap vocals

== Charts ==
=== Weekly charts ===
Chart (1989)	Peak position
Italy Airplay (Music & Media)	13
US Dance Club Songs (Billboard)	1

Chart (1990)	Peak position
Australian Singles Chart	107
UK Singles Chart	83
