= Lorena Xtravaganza =

Puerto Rican model and sex worker and murder victim

- Born: October 14, 1986; Puerto Rico
- Died: May 12, 2012 (aged 25); Brooklyn, New York
- Cause of death: Asphyxia by strangulation and suffocation
- Citizenship: American
- Occupations: Performer, make-up artist, model
- Years active: 2004–2012

Lorena Escalera (October 14, 1986 – May 12, 2012), known professionally as Lorena Xtravaganza, was a Puerto Rican transgender performer known for her impersonations of Beyoncé and Jennifer Lopez. She was given the last name Xtravaganza for her membership of a celebrated group called the House of Xtravaganza.

Escalera posthumously rose to mainstream attention after her murder in 2012. She was found unconscious and unresponsive in her Bushwick apartment. Escalera's apartment was set on fire after she had been suffocated.

== Biography ==
Lorena Escalera was born in Puerto Rico and moved to New York City when she turned eighteen years old. Escalera had been working as a make-up artist in Puerto Rico but wanted to come to New York City to broaden her career as a performer and model. Once arriving, Escalera joined the renowned performance house, the House of Xtravaganza, which were featured in the popular 1990 documentary, Paris is Burning. She began walking balls and competing for prizes as an Xtravaganza; picking up the name La'reina Xtravaganza from fans. Xtravaganza also had a career as a model; although it is not known to the public what she modeled for.

== Death ==
On May 11, 2012, Escalera brought two men to her apartment, at 43 Furman Avenue in Bushwick, according to police reports. At about 4 a.m., a fire broke out in the apartment. A passer-by ran into the four-story building and began banging on doors, according to a neighbor. In the ensuing chaos, everyone except Escalera seemed to emerge from the building. Firefighters arrived, as did officers from the 83rd Precinct. When the blaze was extinguished, at 4:37 a.m., Escalera was discovered, "unconscious and unresponsive" and paramedics declared her dead at the scene. A fire department spokesman said that firefighters using thermal imaging equipment found the body on a bed.

Though the fire has been deemed suspicious, investigators have found no evidence of accelerant. The police were still awaiting a determination on the cause from fire marshals. Escalera's roommates said that when work was done on the electrical system, they created holes around the electrical outlets and filled them with cardboard. The whereabouts of the two visitors were not known, though a neighbor said he was told by the passer-by that two men were arguing in front of the building at the time of the fire.

== Media coverage ==
The New York Times article covering Escalera's death was criticized by GLAAD for being "trans exploitation".

== See also ==
- List of unsolved murders (2000–present)
