= Shelly Mars =

American actress

- Occupations: performance artist, Actress, printmaker
- Years active: 1980–present

Shelly Mars is a performance artist, actor and printmaker.

== Career ==
Since starting performing in San Francisco in the early 1980s, Mars has done everything from improvisational stage work to voiceovers to movies and is best known for her monologues and gender-bending portrayals of various subcultures, with a focus on queer culture.

== Film and TV appearances ==
Her first film role was in Monika Treut's Die Jungfrauenmaschine (a.k.a. Virgin Machine), a groundbreaking film about the hedonistic exploration of sexuality. Mars went on to appear in many more films, including Drop Dead Rock with Debbie Harry and Adam Ant, Jennie Livingston's Who's the Top?, Venus Boyz, Mary Harron's The Notorious Bettie Page and a documentary based on her own life, The Dark Matter of Mars.

After Virgin Machine's release in 1988, Mars was at the forefront of the emerging drag king culture in the US and appeared on such television shows as The Kids in the Hall, The Phil Donahue Show, The Montel Williams Show and The Sally Jesse Raphael Show and on HBO's Real Sex and Drag Kings. More recently, she has been featured in Comedy Central's Out There in Hollywood, A&E's Role Reversal and The Jamie Kennedy Experience on The WB.

== Live performances ==
Her solo shows include Bug Chasers (2005), Whiplash: Tales of a Tomboy (1999), which the New York Times called her "a female Candide", and Invasion from Mars (1997) working in venues across New York and beyond: Abrons Art Center, PS 122, New York Theatre Workshop, The Kitchen and the Grove Street Playhouse.

She performed in the Night of 100 Stars to raise money for the first New York International Fringe Festival (1997). Mars' autobiographical show, Sex on Mars, enjoyed a five-month run in Provincetown, MA in 2000.

Her Homo Bonobo Project show, which is ongoing, weaves themes of sexuality, love, and violence into an educational piece about the bonobos of the Congo.

Recently, Mars has been Artist in Residence at NYC's Museum of Sex and has received grants from the New York State Council on the Arts (2010), the Arcus Foundation, the Gill Foundation, and the Franklin Furnace Fund for Performance Art.

She is currently hosting a performance series at Dixon Place called Bulldyke Chronicles that she co-hosts with Kirby the Bulldog.

She has taught others the how-tos of performance art and creating one's own monologue; her own monologues have been published in Creating Your Own Monologue.

== Printmaking ==
Mars has recently started doing printmaking and textile work with paper, metal and tee shirts in a style that reflects the intensity, sexuality and darkly layered aspects of her performance art.
