= Ivan Monforte =

- Born: 1973 (age 52–53); Merida, Yucatan, Mexico
- Education: University of California, Los Angeles; New York University
- Website: SmackMellon.org

Ivan Monforte (Spanish pronunciation: [ˈiβam moɱˈfoɾte]; born 1973) is a Mexican performance artist based in New York. His work aspires to start a dialogue for disenfranchised members of the LGBT community about sexuality, love, sex, and loss.

== Early life and education ==
Monforte was born in Merida, Yucatan, Mexico. He lives in New York City, New York.

He received his Bachelor of Arts from the University of California, Los Angeles in 1996, and Master of Fine Arts at New York University in 2004. He also attended Skowhegan School of Painting and Sculpture in Skowhegan, Maine in 2004.

Early in his career, Monforte worked freelance art jobs for galleries and museums as an art handler, photographer and videographer.

== Work ==
Ivan Monforte has shown work at various museums in New York, including Bronx Museum of the Arts, El Museo del Barrio, and the Queens Museum. His work often uses "simple gestures and materials, as well as emotional language and content, as strategic tools to address themes of loss and mourning, representations of class, gender, race and sexuality, as well as the pursuit of love."

Monforte also works as a social worker. His art work and social work influence each other. Monforte has "worked in HIV prevention education, testing, and social marketing with a special focus on disenfranchised communities, such as homeless adolescents, immigrants, and lesbian, gay, bisexual, and transgender youth." His exhibition entitled There But For the Grace Of God Go I (2007) explores HIV in the Bronx community. A year before the project was first performed, he worked at an AIDS service organization with LGBTQ teenagers in the South Bronx as a sexual health educator focusing on HIV and STI prevention education. He is a certified HIV tester, which supported his exhibition that tested participants for HIV. His project entitled "Play Smart" trading cards in collaboration with Amos Mac, Richard Renaldi and Christopher Schulz starts a dialogue for Mexican immigrants, especially those of the gay community.

In 2006, Monforte organized an exhibition at Buzzer Thirty, a gallery in Astoria, Queens. The exhibit titled I Never Meant to Hurt You (2006) showed artwork that expressed or represented pain, collected from seven artists. The artwork consisted of videos and paintings. In 2011, at La MaMa Galleria, he contributed to an exhibition entitled Mixed Messages: A(I)DS, Art + Words (2011). The show was sponsored by Visual AIDS, the same artist organization with whom Monforte also produced Play Smart (2012) trading cards. The artists each contributed artwork that used words to bring urgency to the communication of art. Monforte embroidered the words "You're Beautiful" for his piece.

=== There But For The Grace Of God Go I, 2007 ===
Ivan Monforte produced a social sculpture in 2007 at the Longwood Art Gallery in Bronx, New York, in which free and confidential HIV tests were provided. The installation took its name from a song of the same name by the disco band, Machine. The exhibition focused on the effects of disco on culture; during the disco era, HIV was transmitted silently throughout the community. The Bronx has some of the poorest neighborhoods in NYC, and also one of the highest rates of HIV. The goal of the exhibition was to start a dialogue about HIV in the Bronx. Monforte said on the project that "it often became an opportunity to talk about art, public health, activism, and AIDS, and their relationship to each other, as well as educate people about HIV prevention, testing, and treatment." Originally the project was conducted in the gallery kitchen at Longwood Art Gallery. However, during the second iteration of the project, it was shut down by a security guard. A detailed description of the tests were forwarded to the head of public safety of the school. At this point, an anonymous committee decided the tests could not take place in a kitchen "where food was prepared and could potentially pose a health hazard." However, rather than blood tests, oral tests were being conducted which would not pose a health risk. The project continued in a classroom. The misinformation around HIV tests that caused the exhibition to be moved only proved "HIV is still read as something to be afraid of that needs to be contained, regardless of biological evidence to the contrary."

=== Mean, 2008 ===
In a group show, assembled by a guest curator, Christopher Y. Lew, manager of curatorial affairs at New York's P.S. 1 Contemporary Art Center, "Ivan Monforte works with a different kind of found material -- verbal insults and put-downs he has heard or experienced. His piece "Mean" (2008) consists of several of the insults printed on paper and hung around the exhibition walls. They are actually quite confrontational. This is one of the show's more successful conceptual projects."

=== Play Smart, 2012 ===
In 2012, Ivan Monforte contributed to another project to promote knowledge on HIV. Play Smart trading cards were created using photographs by Monforte, Amos Mac, Richard Renaldi and Christopher Schulz. The cards were designed by John Chaich. The cards are meant to be freely distributed to increase information on HIV risks, testing and post-exposure prophylaxis. Monforte contributed his photographs of Mexican luchadores to focus "on positive self-worth and sexuality for undocumented Mexican immigrants." The other artists used photographs of members of other gay communities.

=== House and Ball Culture ===
In 2010, Ivan Monforte wrote an essay entitled "House and Ball Culture Go Wide" for The Gay & Lesbian Review Worldwide. In this essay, he writes a brief history of house and ball culture. The history of this community reflects his own work, as his work's subject is often members of the LGBTQ community that are excluded or disenfranchised members of society. Ball culture was also the topic of a project to which he contributed entitled The B Sides in 2008. The project explored the relationship between house music and contemporary art. The exhibition was held by Aljira, a Center for Contemporary Art in collaboration with the House of Jourdan-Zion. He also works with Gay Men’s Health Crisis to help provide HIV prevention education to the House and Ball community and organized the twenty-first annual Latex Ball at Roseland Ballroom.

In 2011, Monforte participated in the How to Cut a Queen discussion with New Museum resident Wu Tsang and Jonathan Oppenheim, editor of the 1990 documentary "Paris is Burning." The discussion "revisits the context and impact of Paris is Burning and considers the role that editing plays in documentary storytelling and the politics of representation."

=== Video Work ===
Ivan Monforte creates video work which he exhibits on several platforms, including YouTube, and Xtube. In 2009, he uploaded a video to YouTube entitled "I Belong To You." The video and others in this series feature Monforte in a white tank top, standing in front of a blank wall. In this video, he is kissed by an anonymous man, while the 1974 song of the same name by the girl group, Love Unlimited, plays. The next video in the series is entitled "Que Te Vaya Bonito" after a song of the same name by Chavela Vargas. In this video, he appears visibly saddened until he is hugged by an anonymous man. He begins to cry in the man's arms. In another video of the same style as the two previous, he receives oral sex from three anonymous men. The video is titled "Tres Veces" which translates to "three times." Other videos feature him shaving his beard off or receiving a tattoo. While in Samoa, he interviewed Fa'afafines. He also received the Lima tattoo while he was there, the process of which he filmed.

== Residencies ==
=== Awards ===
- UCLA Art Council Award
- Lambent Fellowship in the Arts from the Tides Foundation

=== Residencies ===
- Sidestreet Projects
- Lower East Side Print Shop
- Smack Mellon
- Center for Book Arts
