= Paris Dupree =

American drag performer (1950–2011)

- Dupree in c. 1990
- Born: 1950
- Died: August 2011 (aged 61); New York City U.S.
- Occupations: Drag Performer; Founding Mother of The House of Dupree
- Notable work: Paris Is Burning

Paris Dupree (also stylized as Paris Duprée or Paris DuPree; 1950 – August 2011) was an American drag performer and documentary participant featured in Jennie Livingston's 1990 documentary, Paris is Burning, which was named after Dupree's annual ball.

== Career ==
Dupree was the founding member and mother of the House of Dupree, which mobilized young, urban gays to express themselves in ways that mainstream America could not quite understand in the 1970s. In 1990 Dupree was featured in Jennie Livingston's documentary film, Paris is Burning. Dupree inspired the film’s title. She is remembered for her line "That's right! I said it! Butch queen! Boy in the day, girl at night".

== Legacy ==
In one of the legends surrounding the origin of vogue, Dupree is credited as the originator or one of the pioneers of the dance form, and it was because of her that the art form is called vogue. Vogueing was originally the imitation of models in magazines and runways.

It is reported when she attended an after hours nightclub called Footsteps on 2nd Avenue and 14th Street, some gay Black men were throwing shade at each other. Dupree had a copy of Vogue magazine in her bag and started dancing then suddenly stopped, posing to the beat of the music imitating the models' poses. That provocation was returned in kind by the other Black gay men in the club. What followed next was a dancing and posing competition to the beat of the music. According to Kevin UltraOmni (founder of the Legendary House of Omni):

I know Paris was an early pioneer of voguing. But I believe that vogue existed in some other form through other people as well. I also think that a lot of voguing poses come from African art and Egyptian hieroglyphics.

— Kevin Ultra Omni, Voguing and the House Ballroom Scene of New York City 1989-92

It was also during the House of Dupree's first ball in 1981 that "the categories were really there (sic)," thereby establishing Paris in some quarters as the inventor of the competition categories. This legacy is still continued to this day (with additions) as a result of the first Dupree ball in 1981. Today, gay clubs have voguing competitions, inspired by Paris.

Her 1988 ball was held at Club Zanzibar.

== Paris Is Burning (film) ==
Paris Dupree featured in the 1990 documentary film Paris Is Burning. The film was first shown at the NewFest New York's LGBT Film Festival on June 9, 1990. Paris Is Burning follows Dupree and other drag queens participating in balls. It features The House of Dupree, founded by Dupree and talks about the origin of voguing, a dance Dupree pioneered.

"This is a film that is important for anyone to see, whether they're gay or not. It's about how we're all influenced by the media; how we strive to meet the demands of the media by trying to look like Vogue models or by owning a big car. And it's about survival. It's about people who have a lot of prejudices against them and who have learned to survive with wit, dignity and energy."

— Jennie Livingston, Orlando Sentinel

== Death ==
Paris Dupree died in August 2011 in New York City. She was sixty-one years old.

== See also ==
- Club Zanzibar (black electronic-music venue in 1980s-era Newark, New Jersey)
