= Kevin Burrus =

American speaker, film producer, and LGBTQ activist

- Born: October 8, 1958 (age 68); Brooklyn, New York
- Education: New York City Community College
- Occupation: Film producer
- Years active: 1979-present

Kevin Burrus, also known as Kevin UltraOmni (born 1958) is an American mentor, speaker, LGBTQ activist, and film producer who founded the ball culture House of Omni in 1979–which was renamed the House of UltraOmni in 1990–and has chapters across the country. He has become an authority on ball culture and has spoken in interviews about the movement. Omni is also the assistant director for the documentary How Do I Look, produced by Wolfgang Busch which aims to correct misperceptions about ball culture.

== Early life and education ==
Kevin Burrus was born October 8, 1958 in Bedford-Stuyvesant, Brooklyn, the fifth of six children.

From 1973-1976 he attended Clara Barton High School For Health Professions in Brooklyn, New York. He majored in medical lab technology and hospital office procedures.

He then went to New York City Community College with a focus on liberal arts and science. He entered the Strive Program, and developed an interest in sexuality-associated behavior.

== Career ==
Burrus has been involved in radio promotions for "The Red-Alert Show" on 98.7 Kiss FM in NY from 1991–1992. He was also involved as a dancer on TV show Jerry Bledsoe's Soul Alive (WPIX channel 11), and a guest on "Morning Radio's Star & Buc Wild Show" on 105.1 FM.

== Outreach and educating ==
Omni started attending house ball culture events in 1979, “They were colorful, very "Las Vegas showgirl", very "Cabaret", full of entertainment. People knew how to sew their own garments, and took pride in being able to pay for what they put on their backs.” Omni founded the ball house of Omni in 1980–which was renamed the House of UltraOmni in 1990–and has chapters across the country. Omni came from Thomas "Dimples" Baker who picked it out of a dictionary. The house system that supports the ball culture traces back to at least the early 1900s. Costume balls where LGBTQ people, including people of color, could attend and even be celebrated. The modern house system and ball culture started in the 1970s and became a social network for many gay and trans black and Latino homeless teenagers. Omni served as both house mother and father, mentoring those he took into the house. In 1988 he appointed Michael Wooten, a dancer and a singer who does shows throughout New York and New Jersey, as the first official house father in 1988. In 1990 the documentary Paris Is Burning debuted taking the culture and its signature dance style, voguing, mainstream. The same year Madonna—who celebrates many dance forms in concerts and videos—released “Vogue” which featured the dance taking it global.

As the assistant producer of the documentary film How Do I Look, Omni reaches out to many communities informing and educating them on Ball Culture. Together with producer & director Wolfgang Busch, they used the film as a focal point for a college tour with panels including Yale, Penn State and NYU, and teach-ins discussing the house culture and challenges of LGBTQ youth of color. In 2010 he was a panelist for the Hudson Valley LGBT Conference in Kingston, NY. He lectures on sexuality, health-related issues, homelessness, drugs, mental illness, and domestic violence. Since 2006, Omni has served as Public Relations/Media Contact for "Art From the Heart LLC", producing artistic empowerment Programs, and preserving Ballroom history. Omni delivers lectures nationwide and internationally, helping to furthering HIV/AIDS education and awareness and Ballroom culture. As of 2019, Omni estimates he has lost more than 600 friends in the ballroom scene, at some points feeling he was attending one funeral after the next. From 1989-1991, he helped organize The Love Ball fundraiser for the Design Industries Foundation Fighting AIDS (DIFFA), a nonprofit educating about and advocating for people impacted by HIV/AIDS. In 2012 he founded together with Wolfgang Omni Busch the Kevin Omni Burrus Funeral/Burial Fund to help defray funeral costs for members of the Ballroom community.
