= Snake dance (disambiguation) =

A snake dance is a parade before or during a high school or college homecoming event.

Snake dance or Snakedance may also refer to:

- Snakedance, a 1983 Doctor Who TV serial
- "Snake Dance", a song by Hawkwind from Electric Tepee
- "Snake Dance", a song by The March Violets
- "Snake Dance", a song by Monster Magnet from Monster Magnet
- "Snake Dance", a song by Jay Chou from Capricorn
- "SnakeDance", a song by Ooberman from Hey Petrunko
- "Snakedance", a song by The Rainmakers
- "Snake Dance", a song by World Entertainment War
- A dance performed by a dancer using a snake as a prop. See Odette Valery.
