= Danni Xtravaganza =

New York ballroom scene member (1961–1996)

- Born: July 14, 1961; Puerto Rico
- Died: January 9, 1996 (aged 34); Manhattan, New York, U.S.
- Occupation: musician

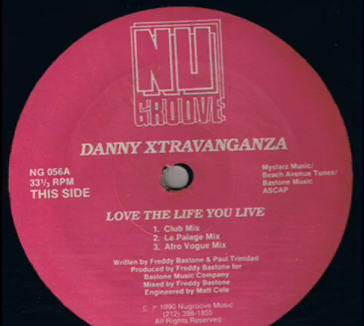
Label from 12″ single of 'Love the Life You Live' by Danny Xtravaganza; produced by Freddy Bastone for NuGroove records, 1990.

Danni Xtravaganza (July 14, 1961 – January 9, 1996) (sometimes spelled Danny and/or Extravaganza) was a founding member of the House of Xtravaganza (est. 1982), the first primarily Latino house in the underground Harlem ball culture.

== Biography ==
Born July 14, 1961, in Puerto Rico, Daniel Camacho was raised in Brooklyn, New York by his mother until he left home at 16. Consistent with the tradition of ball culture, in 1982 Danni took the House name as his surname. As a teenager he studied ballroom dancing, the foundation of the elegant Vogue dance style he performed on the ballroom runways. In ball culture where House members compete in various categories, Danni Xtravaganza was widely respected for his unique ability to compete in categories as diverse as Vogue (dance), Runway (modeling), Punk Rock (fashion), and Butch Queen in Drags (a man impersonating a woman).

In 1990 Danni appeared in the popular Jennie Livingston documentary Paris Is Burning and recorded 'Love the Life You Live', produced by Freddy Bastone for Nu Groove records.

A 'legendary' figure in the New York ball community, and a fixture in the famed discos and nightclubs of the period including Paradise Garage, Tracks and The Sound Factory, Danni was appointed the Mother of the House of Xtravaganza by the original House Mother, Angie Xtravaganza, prior to her death in 1993. Danni led the House of Xtravaganza in that capacity until his death on January 9, 1996, in Manhattan, aged 34.
