= Octavia St. Laurent =

American model and AIDS educator (1964–2009)

- St. Laurent in Paris Is Burning, c. 1990
- Born: March 16, 1964; Brooklyn, New York, U.S.
- Died: May 17, 2009 (aged 45); Syracuse, New York, U.S.
- Other names: Heavenly Angel Octavia Saint Laurent Manolo Blahnik; Octavia Saint Laurent Mizrahi
- Years active: 1982–2009

Octavia St. Laurent Mizrahi (March 16, 1964 – May 17, 2009) was an American model and AIDS educator who was active in New York City's Black and Latino ballroom community and Harlem's luxurious balls. She came to public attention after being featured in the 1990 documentary Paris Is Burning.

== Career ==
St. Laurent began walking in the New York City ballroom scene in 1982, with "Swept Away" by Diana Ross as her favorite accompanying music. She rose to prominence with the 1990 documentary Paris Is Burning and had a small role in 1993's The Saint of Fort Washington. She was the central character in the short documentary Queen of the Underground (1993, directed by Adam Soch), in which she criticized "big-time celebrities that go around in their cars picking up transvestites, having sex with them, and then getting on TV and making fun of them"--making an explicit reference to Eddie Murphy.

In 2006, she starred in Wolfgang Busch's How Do I Look, dubbed as "the sequel to Paris is Burning", and was using the name Heavenly Angel Octavia St Laurent Manolo Blahnik.

== Personal life ==
St. Laurent was born in Brooklyn, New York, on March 16, 1964. Early in her life, St. Laurent identified as a trans woman, but later identified as intersex and said she had been that since birth. St. Laurent said that growing up, her parents were accepting: "I had wonderful parents that supported me. My sexuality was not an issue with my parents. They were accustomed to that since I was a child. People thought I looked like a little girl, and my mother said: 'This is a boy!'" She said she experienced police harassment and was arrested on several occasions for wearing gender-nonconforming clothing in public.

St. Laurent was diagnosed as HIV positive, and later helped spread awareness about the disease. During her appearance in Wolfgang Busch's LGBT documentary How Do I Look, St. Laurent further discussed her drug use, sex work, and fight with AIDS. In 2000 she delivered a eulogy after the murder of Amanda Milan, at Metropolitan Community Church.

In 2008, St. Laurent was diagnosed with cancer. She moved in with her sister while receiving treatment and started a one-person show at Spirits gay bar in Syracuse, New York, which she described as a quiet place for respite. St. Laurent gave a final interview by phone in March 2009 and died after a long battle with cancer on May 17, 2009, in Syracuse, New York, aged 45. St. Laurent is buried in a cemetery in Queens, New York.

== Acknowledgements ==
St. Laurent's appearance in Paris Is Burning was cited in Judith Butler's book Bodies That Matter in "Gender is Burning".

== Filmography ==
Year	Title	Role	Notes
1990	Paris Is Burning	Herself	Documentary
1993	The Saint of Fort Washington	Sex worker in car	
1993	Octavia Saint Laurent: Queen of the Underground	Herself	Documentary
2005	Pill Awards	Hostess	TV Award show
2006	How Do I Look	Herself	Documentary
