= How Do I Look =

2006 film by Wolfgang Busch

- Directed by: Wolfgang Busch; Kevin Omni (assistant); Luna Khan (assistant)
- Produced by: Wolfgang Busch
- Starring: Kevin Aviance; Pepper LaBeija; Willi Ninja; Octavia St. Laurent; Emanuel Xavier; Salaudin Muhammad
- Cinematography: Wolfgang Busch
- Edited by: Wolfgang Busch; Darryl Hell; Gregg Payne
- Music by: Tori Fixx; Michael O'Hara; Harmonica Sunbeam
- Distributed by: Art From the Heart Films
- Release date: June 4, 2006 (New York City)
- Running time: 80 minutes
- Country: United States
- Language: English

How Do I Look is a 2006 American documentary directed by Wolfgang Busch. The film chronicles ball culture in Harlem and Philadelphia over a ten-year period.

== Overview ==
Wolfgang Busch began interviewing subjects from the ball circuit in 1995 and continued filming for a decade. How Do I Look preserves the ball culture, which began in the 1920s during the Harlem Renaissance, and has since influenced mainstream artists and musicians, university students use the film for thesis, community based and not for profit organizations for education and outreach. The film follows several ball "legends" such as Willi Ninja, Kevin UltraOmni, Octavia St. Laurent, Pepper LaBeija, Jose Xtravaganza and Carmen Xtravaganza. Many of the subjects that are featured in How Do I Look were also featured in the 1990 documentary Paris Is Burning.

How Do I Look also explores the prejudices members of the ball culture face due to their sexuality and race. In a 2005 New York Times article, choreographer and voguing dance ambassador Willi Ninja commented about the mainstream society's readiness to embrace facets of ball culture while also rejecting the Ball "children" due to their sexuality:

... "If Madonna does voguing, it's O.K.," he added. "But when the ball children dance, even now, people say, 'Oh, it's a bunch of crazy queens throwing themselves on the floor.'"

Other subjects speak about their attempts to forge careers in mainstream society and the effect that HIV and AIDS has had on ball culture as many of the subjects featured died of AIDS during or shortly after filming was complete.

How Do I Look? is hailed by members of the ball community, as a film that uplifts and prioritizes voices and experiences of community members. Many cast members express disdain and frustration over how Paris is Burning was produced, edited, and received by the public. Cast members, such as Carmen Xtravaganza and Marcel Christian Labeija, express frustration over how the cast was treated and portrayed in Paris is Burning, stating that they felt exploited and taken advantage of.

== Reception ==
=== Box office ===
As an independent film production, How Do I Look did not receive financing or distribution from the commercial film industry. The filmmakers arranged independent screenings and distribution world-wide. As a result, the film was not made widely available in commercial movie theatres or art-houses upon its release in June 2006 during Gay Pride month. The documentary's earnings have principally come from the sale of DVD's and, more recently, from online streaming sites. Over the years, however, How Do I Look has earned commercial success by word of mouth recommendations, its numerous appearances in film festivals, Black Prides and Universities, and from its good standing relationship with the Ball community.

=== Critical response ===
Prior to its release in 2006, early screenings of How Do I Look garnered prominent media mentions in the Village Voice, the New York Post, and The New York Times.

Early on, How Do I Look was noted as an "artistic awareness program," alluding to the film's noble aspects to improve the Ballroom communities public reputation, providing opportunities and to empower members of the Ballroom community. The media attention also focused on the African-American and Latino gay subculture, who were known to go to lengths to keep their homosexuality "under wraps," a situation referred to as being on the down low. Often, the film's numerous screenings in academic settings were reported.

In the years following its release, How Do I Look has repeatedly been the subject of reports in the foreign press, including in the French public radio channel, France Inter. The documentary was noted for its goal of empowering the LGBTQ Ballroom community, in particular following the AIDS pandemic, as was reported in Italian Vogue. In Spanish Vanity Fair, the documentary was noted for having given new life to the vogue (dance) artistic impression, in particular by having added social, racial, and political conscience to the Ballroom community.

=== Accolades ===
Because How Do I Look was produced by and for the Ballroom community, it has been praised for having the cooperation of the Ball community in its production and for being faithful to its subject matter. The documentary has been named to several must-watch lists by the LGBTQ media. Them, the LGBTQ publication owned by Condé Nast, short-listed How Do I Look in its review of Ballroom history. Out magazine listed How Do I Look amongst six films about the Ballrooms and voguing. Mainstream culture publications, like W magazine, have also short-listed How Do I Look as a must-see "pride" film for LGBTQ audiences.

The revealing interviews documented in How Do I Look have been lauded, in retrospect, for having been ahead of their time. In a review of "Transgender Sex Work and Society," which has been described as the definitive book about transgender sex work, a transgender star of How Do I Look was noted for her frank talk about transgender sex work.

=== Controversies ===
How Do I Look began filming in the wake of accusations that Jennie Livingston, the filmmaker behind Paris Is Burning, had exploited the Ballroom community after the release of that film. The accused exploitation was the inspiration for How Do I Look, said co-assistant director Kevin Omni. In the years since How Do I Look was released, the documentary has been mentioned by many as providing balance to and/or a follow-up or sequel of content of Paris Is Burning. Two of the assistant directors of the film are members of the Ballroom community, Kevin Omni and Luna Khan. In the media, Omni has also noted that the film aimed to create "possibilities" for members of the Ballroom community.

== Production notes ==
How Do I Look was filmed in New York City and Philadelphia. It premiered at the NewFest Film Festival in New York City in June 2006. The assistant directors were Kevin Burrus and Luna Khan.

== Home media ==
How Do I Look was released on Region 1 DVD in the United States.
