= Venus Xtravaganza =

American performer and dancer

- A still of Xtravaganza from Paris Is Burning
- Born: May 5, 1965; Jersey City, New Jersey, U.S.
- Died: December 21, 1988 (aged 23); New York City, U.S.
- Cause of death: Strangulation (murder)
- Occupation: Performer
- Years active: 1978/1979 – 1988
- Notable work: Paris Is Burning

Venus Pellagatti Xtravaganza (May 5, 1965 – December 21, 1988) was an American transgender woman and performer associated with New York City's ball culture scene. She came to national attention after her posthumous appearance in the 1990 documentary Paris Is Burning, directed by Jennie Livingston, in which her life as a member of the House of Xtravaganza formed one of the film's central storylines. Her visibility and unsolved murder have since made her an enduring figure in LGBTQ cultural history.

== Early life ==
Xtravaganza was born on May 5, 1965, in Jersey City, New Jersey. Her parents were of Italian-American and Puerto Rican descent. She had four brothers. Xtravaganza took the name Venus after a close friend suggested it.

== Career ==
Xtravaganza stated in Paris Is Burning that she began cross-dressing and performing at the age of 13 or 14, placing her earliest performances around 1978 or 1979. She eventually left her family home, stating she did not "want to embarrass them," and moved in with her grandmother at 343.5 8th Street in Jersey City to pursue her identity.

Her ball culture career began in 1983 when House of Xtravaganza founder Hector Valle invited her to join the house. She later described him as "the first gay man I ever met." On her 15th birthday, Valle took her to Greenwich Village, hosted a party, and bought her a cake.

After Valle died of AIDS-related complications in 1985, Angie Xtravaganza became house mother and took Venus as her drag daughter. When filming Paris Is Burning, Xtravaganza was an aspiring model and expressed a desire for gender-affirming surgery to "feel complete."

== Death ==
On December 21, 1988, Xtravaganza was found dead in a room at the Fulton Hotel at 264 West 46th Street in New York City. Her body had been placed under a mattress, and investigators determined she had been bound and strangled. It was believed she had died three to four days prior to being discovered. Filming for Paris Is Burning was still underway, and the documentary's final scenes feature Angie Xtravaganza reacting to Venus's death. Angie recalled that Venus "was too wild with people in the streets" and had feared that "something [was] going to happen to [her]." Angie was the first person detectives contacted, and she later informed Venus's biological family.

In 2022, the New York City Police Department reopened the case following collaborative efforts during the production of the documentary I'm Your Venus. The film chronicles how members of Venus's biological family and the House of Xtravaganza worked together to honor her memory and pursue justice. The Trans Doe Task Force served in an advisory capacity on DNA evidence processing, although specific case details remain confidential.

Later that year, Venus's family successfully petitioned for a posthumous legal name change, officially recognizing her as Venus Pellagatti Xtravaganza.

In Paris Is Burning, Xtravaganza described narrowly escaping an attack by a man who discovered she was transgender during an intimate encounter. It is speculated that her murder occurred under similar circumstances. Her killer was never identified. She is buried at Holy Cross Cemetery in North Arlington, New Jersey.

== Family ==
In the 2024 documentary I'm Your Venus, Venus's biological brothers, John, Joe, and Louie Pellagatti, discuss her early life and their evolving understanding of her gender identity. They say they accepted her while she was alive and want to honor her legacy by reconnecting with her chosen family, the House of Xtravaganza.

== Legacy ==
- In their 1993 book Bodies That Matter: On the Discursive Limits of "Sex", philosopher and gender theorist Judith Butler discusses Xtravaganza's interviews in the context of transgender identity and gender theory.
- In 2013, a New York City theatre group staged a murder mystery play inspired by her death. Members of the House of Xtravaganza distanced themselves from the production and condemned it as "inappropriate, opportunistic, and disrespectful to Venus' legacy." Xtravaganza's biological family also expressed displeasure with the play.
- In the 2006 documentary How Do I Look, the Venus Xtravaganza Legends Award was presented to Jazmine Givenchy in recognition of contributions to ballroom culture.
- References to Xtravaganza and her quotes appear throughout the reality television series RuPaul's Drag Race, particularly in Season 4, Episode 2, when contestant Willam Belli echoes a read she delivered in the documentary.
- On March 31, 2023, Trans Day of Visibility, the City of Jersey City designated the Pellagatti family home at 343.5 8th Street as a historic landmark.
- On June 6, 2024, the documentary I'm Your Venus premiered at the Tribeca Film Festival, chronicling how Venus's biological and ballroom families came together to celebrate her legacy and pursue justice. The film was nominated for the 2026 GLAAD Media Award for Outstanding Documentary.
- The House of Xtravaganza remains active in the ballroom scene and LGBTQ+ activism. It is one of the oldest still-active houses in New York City.

== See also ==
- LGBT culture in New York City
- List of LGBT people from New York City
- Lists of solved missing person cases
- List of people killed for being transgender
- List of unsolved murders (1980–1999)
