= Dorian Corey =

American drag performer and designer

- Dorian Corey in Paris Is Burning
- Born: Frederick Legg; June 6, 1937; Buffalo, New York, U.S.
- Died: August 29, 1993 (aged 56); New York City, U.S.
- Education: Parsons School of Design
- Occupations: Drag queen, fashion designer

Dorian Corey (June 6, 1937 – August 29, 1993) was an American drag performer and fashion designer. She appeared in Wigstock and was featured in Jennie Livingston's 1990 documentary Paris Is Burning.

== Early life and education ==
Corey was born in Buffalo, New York to Franklin Legg and Mary Fox Clark out of wedlock, though they later married on October 18, 1947. Dorian was assigned male at birth, but later identified as a trans woman. Raised on a farm in Buffalo, Dorian began performing in drag, when leaving the city of Buffalo.

In the 1950s, Corey worked as a window dresser at Hengerer's, then moved to New York City to study art at Parsons.

== Career ==
In the 1960s, Corey toured as a snake dancer in the Pearl Box Revue, a cabaret drag act. She was one of four performers who appeared on the 1972 Pearl Box Revue LP Call Me MISSter.

Corey founded the House of Corey, which holds over 50 grand prizes from vogue balls. She was a mother to Angie Xtravaganza who is featured in the film Paris Is Burning, (1990).

Corey also ran and designed a clothing label called Corey Design. At one point, Corey's act involved her wearing a 30 ft × 40 ft (9.1 m × 12.2 m) feather cape. Once she shed her costume down to a sequined body stocking, two attendants raised the cape up on poles to produce a feathered tent that covered half the audience.

== Death and legacy ==
On August 29, 1993, Corey died of AIDS-related complications at Columbia Presbyterian Medical Center in Manhattan at the age of 56. Corey's cremated remains were scattered in the waters off City Island, New York.

Corey's legacy remains one of importance to the drag and ballroom communities, and her particular importance in the development of voguing as a cornerstone of New York ballroom culture is venerated and memorialized in the modern day. Corey is remembered by fans, friends and family for her simple philosophy that "[e]verybody wants to make an impression, some mark upon the world. [...] You don't have to bend the whole world. I think it's better just to enjoy it. Pay your dues, and just enjoy it. If you shoot an arrow and it goes real high, hooray for you."

== Robert Worley controversy ==
After Corey's death, the preserved body of Robert Worley (also known as Robert Wells) was found amongst her belongings; it appeared that he had died from a gunshot wound to the head. He was last seen by his family in 1968.

Investigators determined the body to have been dead for approximately 25 years. There is speculation that Worley and Corey were lovers, Worley was abusive toward Corey, and Corey shot Worley in self-defense. Alternatively, it is also speculated that Worley may have been shot in an attempted robbery.

In the TV series Pose, transgender house mother Elektra portrayed by Dominique Jackson, who secretly works as a dominatrix in a BDSM club, discovers one of her clients has died from an overdose in her private dungeon. She enlists the aid of other characters to transport, mummify, and hide the body in a trunk. Producer and director Janet Mock confirmed on Twitter that writer Our Lady J based the anthology melodrama on Corey.

== See also ==
- LGBT culture in New York City
- List of LGBT people from New York City
