= Angie Xtravaganza =

Transgender performer in the New York ball scene

- A still of Xtravaganza from Paris is Burning
- Born: October 17, 1964; New York City, U.S.
- Died: March 31, 1993 (aged 28); New York City, U.S.
- Occupation: Performer
- Notable work: Paris Is Burning

Angie Xtravaganza (October 17, 1964 – March 31, 1993) was a co-founder and Mother of the House of Xtravaganza. A prominent transgender performer in New York City's gay ball culture, Xtravanganza featured in the 1990 documentary film Paris is Burning.

== Early life ==
Xtravaganza was born in New York City, one of 13 children born to a Puerto Rican-American family in the South Bronx. From the age of 13, she nurtured a family of "children" on the Christopher Street piers and Times Square, primarily made up of those who had been rejected by their own families; they referred to her as "Ma". Xtravaganza ran away from home when she was 14 years old, and began doing drag and competing in balls in 1980 at the age of 16. It was on the Christopher Street piers where she first met Hector Xtravaganza, with whom she would later found their eponymous house.

== House of Xtravaganza ==
In 1982, the House of Xtravaganza was founded with Xtravaganza taking on the role of House Mother. As House Mother, Xtravaganza set high standards for performance and personal conduct requirements. Some of her other responsibilities included helping her house children select their outfits and shoes for balls, as well as simply navigating being gay in an unaccepting world without the support of their families. Xtravaganza took in many rejected and homeless children under her wing and fed them, as well as celebrated birthdays and holidays with them. She also taught them all about “walking the balls” and the nuances of the New York ball scene. Xtravaganza would also attempt to educate her “children” along with others on the highly stigmatized and still misunderstood HIV/AIDS disease. Having seen many friends and House members lose their battles with the disease, Xtravaganza advocated for more attention towards it as the illness ravaged her community.

Ballroom culture served as a safe haven for LGBTQ+ individuals, including those of color or those taken in by Xtravaganza that were rejected by their families. The House was notable for being the first primarily Latino house within the ball sphere, and was made partially in response to discrimination against Latino performers in the scene at that time. The House of Xtravaganza heavily influenced the New York City gay ball culture, with Xtravanganza becoming known as one of the "terrible five", the five reigning house mothers of the ball world, alongside Dorian Corey, Pepper LaBeija, Avis Pendavis, and Paris Dupree. Under Xtravaganza’s leadership, the House won several accolades and ball titles, cementing a legacy early on in the scene. As a result of her profile, Xtravangaza featured in the 1988 article "The Slap of Love" by Pulitzer Prize-winning author Michael Cunningham, as well as the 1990 documentary film Paris is Burning directed by Jennie Livingston. Xtravaganza's notable drag children included Danni and Venus Xtravaganza, whose life and murder was featured in Paris is Burning. Venus was Xtravaganza’s right hand in the House and her main daughter. After Venus’ death, Xtravaganza claimed that her murder was an unfortunate reality, and simply “part of life being a transsexual in the city”.

== Death and legacy ==
Xtravaganza was diagnosed with AIDS in 1991 and subsequently developed Kaposi's sarcoma, for which she received chemotherapy. Due to the aggressive stage of the disease, Xtravaganza ceased her hormone usage while receiving her cancer treatment. Despite her illness, Xtravaganza continued to care for her children. Xtravaganza died at the height of the AIDS crisis in New York City in 1993 at the age of 28 from AIDS-related liver disease, although it has also been speculated that her liver problems stemmed from her long-term use of black market hormones. At the time of her death, Xtravaganza’s body was covered with lesions as a result of the cancer.

Over 100 mourners attended Xtravaganza’s funeral, sharing the sentiment that “voguing and ecstatic, elaborate balls, had died along with Angie”. Xtravaganza was cremated and her ashes returned to her family, who buried them under her birth name. Three weeks later, The New York Times published an article about the ball scene, featuring a photograph of Xtravaganza with the headline "Paris Has Burned", recounting the untimely deaths of many of its central personalities, including Xtravaganza. In 1994, Junior Vasquez released a single entitled "X" which was dedicated to Xtravaganza.

== See also ==
- LGBT culture in New York City
- List of LGBT people from New York City
