= Pepper LaBeija =

American drag queen, designer (1948–2003)

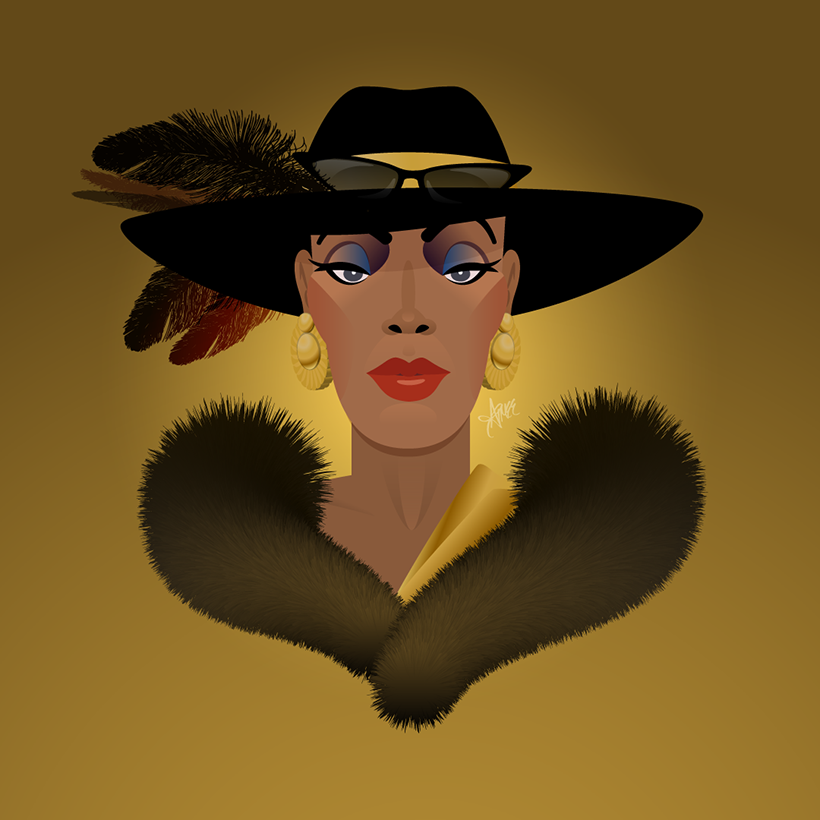
- Illustration by Aimee Stevland
- Born: November 5, 1948; The Bronx, New York, U.S.
- Died: May 14, 2003 (aged 54); Manhattan, New York, U.S.
- Occupations: Drag queen, fashion designer

Pepper LaBeija (November 5, 1948 – May 14, 2003) was an American drag queen and fashion designer. She was known as "the last remaining queen of the Harlem drag balls".

== Early life and career ==
Born in the Bronx in 1948, Pepper LaBeija first arrived on New York city's gay ballroom scene in the late-1960s and eventually became head of the House of LaBeija in 1981.

While not identifying as a woman, LaBeija preferred the pronoun she and had breast implants. LaBeija remained the head of the house (known as "the Mother") until her death in 2003. As the head of the House, LaBeija spoke openly about the importance of providing support and guidance to young gay men arriving on the scene after being alienated from their families.

LaBeija was known for Egyptian-inspired runway performances and won approximately 250 ballroom trophies over the course of her career. Outside of performing, Labeija earned a living producing drag balls and teaching modeling.

== Later years and death ==
LaBeija and her companion Pamela Jackson had a daughter together, and LaBeija devoted much of her time to her family, raising her daughter and stepson. In 1992, Pamela Jackson died. As LaBeija's health declined, her children lived with their maternal grandmother.

LaBeija suffered from diabetes mellitus type 2, which resulted in both of her feet being amputated. She was largely bedridden for the last ten years of her life. On May 14, 2003, LaBeija died of a heart attack at Roosevelt Hospital in Manhattan at the age of 54.

== In popular culture ==
LaBeija is best known for her appearances in the documentary films Paris Is Burning (1990) and How Do I Look? (2006).

LaBeija also made appearances on The Joan Rivers Show (1991), T.V. Transvestite (1982), and The Queen (1968).

Malcolm McLaren mentions LaBeija in a 1989 song and music video "Deep in Vogue", a tribute to the New York gay balls of the 1980s, runway competitions that involved dance, fashion, and attitude.

== See also ==
- LGBT culture in New York City
- List of LGBT people from New York City
- NYC Pride March
