= Jennie Livingston =

American director (born 1962)

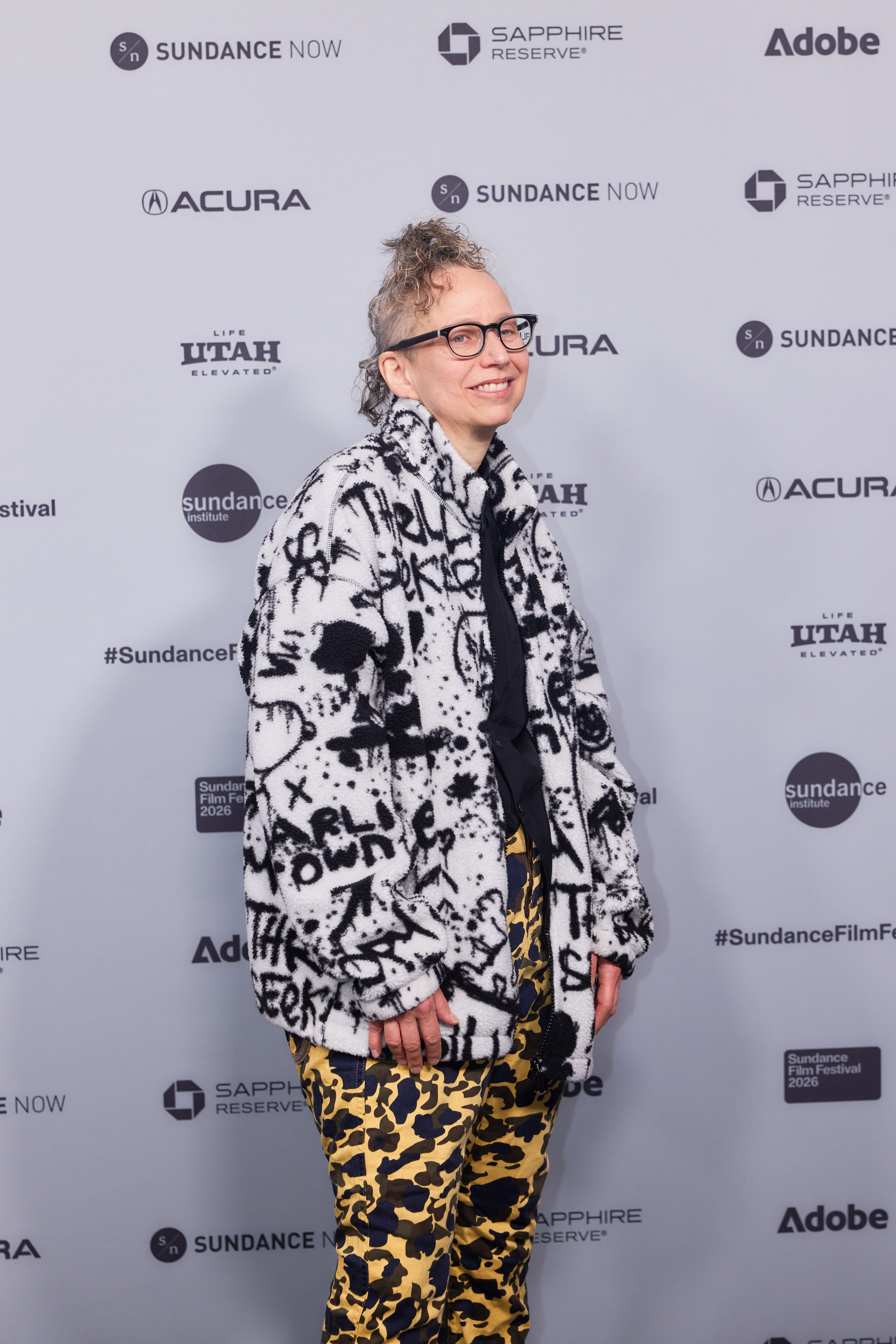
- Livingston in 2026
- Born: February 24, 1962 (age 64); Dallas, Texas, U.S.
- Education: Yale University (BA)
- Occupation: Film director

Jennie Livingston (born February 24, 1962) is an American director best known for the 1990 documentary Paris Is Burning.

== Biography ==
=== Early life and education ===
Livingston was born in Dallas, Texas and grew up in Los Angeles, where her family moved when she was two years old. She is the youngest of three siblings, with two older brothers. Her mother was the poet, children's book author and anthologist Myra Cohn Livingston. Her father Richard Livingston was an accountant and author of the children's book The Hunkendunkens. Her brother Jonas was a music executive at Geffen Records and at MCA Records, and directed the video for Edie Brickell & New Bohemians' 1988 hit song What I Am. She has another brother, Joshua.

Livingston attended Beverly Hills High School and graduated from Yale University in 1983, where she studied photography, drawing, and painting with a minor in English Literature. One of her teachers at Yale was the photographer Tod Papageorge. Livingston took a summer filmmaking class at New York University in 1984..

Livingston moved to New York City in 1985, and was an activist with the AIDS activist group ACT UP. She is an out lesbian and lives in Brooklyn. She is Jewish.

Livingston's father died of heart disease in 1990, her mother and her grandmother both died of cancer within months of each other in 1996. Two years later, her uncle Alan J. Pakula died in a car accident, and Livingston's brother Jonas died suddenly in early 2000. The loss of her family and her experience of grief led her to start work on her film Earth Camp One.

=== Career ===
She worked in the art department on the 1987 film Orphans; director Alan J. Pakula, her uncle, encouraged her to make her first film.

==== Paris Is Burning ====
Livingston's documentary about a New York gay and transgender Black and Latin ball culture won the 1991 Sundance Grand Jury Prize. In 2016, it was included in the Film Archive at the Library of Congress.

The main speakers in Paris is Burning include Octavia St Laurent, Carmen Xtravaganza, Brooke Xtravaganza, Willi Ninja, Dorian Corey, Junior Labeija, Venus Xtravaganza, Freddie Pendavis, Sol Pendavis, Kim Pendavis, and Pepper Labeija.

Jennie Livingston faced backlash from the film since she as a white filmmaker was documenting the lives of primarily Black and Latino LGBTQ+ ballroom communities, which raised concerns about representation and authorship. Some critics argued that the film profited from marginalized communities without fully compensating or crediting the participants whose stories shaped the documentary. Others also debated whether the film simplified or framed complex social issues—like race, class, and identity—in ways that made them more accessible to mainstream audiences but less accurate to lived experiences.

==== Subsequent works ====
Two of Livingston's short films, Hotheads and Who's the Top?, explore queer topics. Hotheads, a 1993 documentary created through the AIDS research-friendly Red Hot Organization, explores two comedians' responses to violence against women: cartoonist Diane Dimassa, and writer/performer Reno. Hotheads was shown on MTV and KQED and released on Polygram Video as part of Red Hot's No Alternative compilation.

Who's the Top?, Livingston's first dramatic short film, premiered at Berlin International Film Festival in 2005, and stars Marin Hinkle, Shelly Mars, and Steve Buscemi. The film, a lesbian sex comedy with musical numbers, also features 24 Broadway dancers choreographed by Broadway choreographer John Carrafa. The film screened at more than 150 film festivals on nearly every continent, including theatrical runs at Boston's Museum of Fine Arts and London's Institute of Contemporary Arts.

Through the Ice is a digital short, commissioned in 2005 for public television station WNET-New York, about the accidental drowning of Miguel Flores in Prospect Park, Brooklyn and about the dog-walkers who tried to save him; the film was also seen at the 2006 Sundance Film Festival.

In 2011, Livingston set up a Kickstarter campaign to support her film project Earth Camp One. A non-fiction feature-length film, it is a memoir/essay about grief, loss, and a hippie summer camp in the 1970s, also a broader exploration of how Americans view loss and impermanence, including collective political loss, and queer identity in relation to loss. Livingston first started working on the project in 2000, wanting to explore the topics of loss and grief after having lost her father, mother, grandfather, uncle, and brother between 1990 and 2000. The film's status has been "post-production" on imdb.com since December 2014.

Livingston has also been developing Prenzlauer Berg, an ensemble episodic project set in the art worlds of New York and East Berlin in the late 1980s.

In 2011, Livingston directed a video for Elton John's show The Million Dollar Piano at Caesars Palace in Las Vegas; the piece is a series of black and white moving-image portraits of a variety of New Yorkers that accompanies the song "Mona Lisas and Mad Hatters". The show ran for 7 years.

Livingston has taught and lectured worldwide, including teaching courses at Yale, Brooklyn College, and Connecticut College. Fellowships have included the Guggenheim Foundation, the Getty Center, the German Academic Exchange (DAAD), The MacDowell Colony, and the National Endowment for the Arts (NEA).

From 2018, Livingston was a consulting producer on the FX TV drama series Pose, which is "heavily inspired" by her documentary Paris Is Burning.

== Filmography ==
=== Film ===
- 1991: Paris Is Burning – director, producer
- 1993: Hotheads – director, producer, editor (Short film)
- 2005: Who's the Top? – director, producer, writer, editor (Short film)
- 2006: Through the Ice – director, producer, editor (Short film)
- TBA: Earth Camp One – director, editor (in post-production)

=== Television ===
- 2018–2019: Pose – consulting producer: seasons 1 and 2; director: episode "Blow" (2.07)

== Theater ==
- 1994: Stonewall – film installation in theatrical production

== See also ==
- LGBTQ culture in New York City
- List of female film and television directors
- List of lesbian filmmakers
- List of LGBTQ-related films directed by women
- List of LGBTQ people from New York City
- NYC Pride March
