= Wolfgang Busch =

American film director

- Born: West Germany
- Occupations: Filmmaker, director, producer

Wolfgang Busch is a German-American documentary filmmaker, director, producer, cinematographer, and editor. He directed and produced the 2006 documentary How Do I Look about the Harlem ballroom scene. He is the founder of Art from the Heart Films, which produces films and videos about the LGBT and disabled communities.

Originally from Heppenheim, West Germany, Busch emigrated to the United States in 1983 to work as a sound and light engineer with touring music bands. He settled in New York City the following year, where he worked as a nightclub promoter. From 1990 to 2000, he hosted a public access television show called New York, New Rock, showcasing artists and nonprofits. He began volunteering with organizations in New York's LGBT community, and was given a "Volunteer of the Year" award in 2001 by the LGBT Community Center.

In 2006, Busch released the documentary How Do I Look about the Harlem ball community, produced through his company Art From The Heart Films. The company has since produced other documentaries on other LGBT and disabled community art forms. Some of his footage was used in the documentary After Stonewall (1999).
