= Paris Is Burning (film) =

1990 film by Jennie Livingston

- Theatrical release poster
- Directed by: Jennie Livingston
- Produced by: Jennie Livingston
- Starring: Dorian Corey; Pepper LaBeija; Venus Xtravaganza; Octavia St. Laurent; Willi Ninja; Angie Xtravaganza; Freddie Pendavis; Junior Labeija
- Cinematography: Paul Gibson
- Edited by: Jonathan Oppenheim
- Production companies: Academy Entertainment; Off White Productions
- Distributed by: Off-White Productions; Prestige Pictures
- Release dates: September 13, 1990 (Toronto); March 13, 1991 (New York City)
- Running time: 78 minutes
- Country: United States
- Language: English
- Budget: $500,000
- Box office: $3.8 million

Paris Is Burning is a 1990 American documentary film directed by Jennie Livingston. Filmed over a period of seven years from the mid-to-late 1980s, it chronicles the ball culture of New York City and the African-American, Latino, gay and transgender communities involved in it.

Critics consider the film to be an invaluable documentary chronicling the end of the "Golden Age" of the New York City ballroom scene, and a thoughtful exploration of race, class, gender and sexuality in America. In 2016, the film was selected for preservation in the United States National Film Registry by the Library of Congress as being "culturally, historically or aesthetically significant". It has since been ranked by numerous publications as one of the greatest documentary films of all time.

== Content ==
Filming through the mid-to-late 1980s, Jennie Livingston explores the elaborately structured ball competitions in which contestants, adhering to a very specific "category" or theme, must "walk", much like a fashion model parades a runway. The balls are viewed as sites for performance, fame, and exclusive celebrity status in the subculture of queer Black and Latino folks, who are rarely afforded the opportunity to exist in mainstream culture. Contestants are judged on criteria including their dance talent, the aesthetic beauty of their clothing, and the "realness" of their drag - i.e., their ability to pass as a member of the stereotype, gender, or sex they are portraying. For example, the category "banjee realness" comprises gay men portraying macho archetypes such as sailors, soldiers, and street hoodlums. "Banjee boys" are judged by their ability to pass as their straight counterparts in the outside world.

Most of the film alternates between footage of balls and interviews with prominent members of the scene, including Pepper LaBeija, Dorian Corey, Angie Xtravaganza, and Willi Ninja. Many of the contestants vying for trophies are representatives of "houses" that serve as intentional families, social groups, and performance teams. Houses are led by "mothers" who are viewed as the best, most powerful, and a maternal figure of their "children". Houses and ball contestants who consistently win trophies for their walks eventually earn "legendary" status.

Livingston, who moved to New York after graduating from Yale to work in film, spent six years making Paris Is Burning, and interviewed key figures in the ball world. Many of them contribute monologues that shed light on gender roles, gay and ball subcultures, and their own life stories. The film explains how words such as house, mother, shade, reading and legendary gain new meaning when used in novel ways to describe the gay and drag subculture. The "houses" serve as surrogate families for young ball-walkers who face rejection from their biological families for their gender expression, identities, and sexual orientation.

The film also explores how its subjects deal with issues such as AIDS, racism, poverty, violence and homophobia. Some, such as Venus Xtravaganza, become sex workers to support themselves. Near the end of the film, Angie Xtravaganza, Venus's "house mother", reacts to news that Venus is found strangled to death and speculates that a disgruntled client killed her. Others shoplift clothing so they can "walk" in the balls. Several are disowned by transphobic and homophobic parents, leaving them vulnerable to homelessness. Some subjects save money for gender affirming surgery; while a few have extensive surgeries, others receive breast implants without undergoing vaginoplasty.

According to Livingston, the documentary is a multi-leveled exploration of an African-American and Latino subculture that serves as a microcosm of fame, race, and wealth in the larger US culture. Through candid one-on-one interviews, the film offers insight into the lives and struggles of its subjects and the strength, pride, and humor they display to survive in a "rich, white world."

Drag is presented as a complex performance of gender, class, and race, and a way to express one's identity, desires and aspirations. The African-American and Latino community depicted in the film includes a diverse range of sexual identities and gender presentations, from "butch queens" (gay cisgender men) to transgender women, to drag queens, to butch women.

The film also documents the origins of "voguing", a dance style in which competing ball-walkers pose and freeze in glamorous positions as if being photographed for the cover of Vogue.

However, Livingston maintained in 1991 that the film was not just about dance:

This is a film that is important for anyone to see, whether they're gay or not. It's about how we're all influenced by the media; how we strive to meet the demands of the media by trying to look like Vogue models or by owning a big car. And it's about survival. It's about people who have a lot of prejudices against them and who have learned to survive with wit, dignity and energy.

== Conception and production ==
Livingston studied photography and painting at Yale University. After moving to New York, she worked for the Staten Island Advance, a local newspaper. She left for one summer to study film at New York University in Greenwich Village. She was photographing in that neighborhood's Washington Square Park, where she met two young men and was intrigued by their dancing and the unusual slang they were using. She asked what they were doing, and they told her that they were voguing. She attended her first ball, a mini-ball at the Gay Community Center on 13th Street, which she filmed as an assignment for her class at NYU.

At that mini-ball, Livingston encountered Venus Xtravaganza for the first time. Later, she spent time with Willi Ninja to learn about ball culture and voguing. She also researched African-American history, literature, and culture, and she also studied queer culture and the nature of subcultures. She conducted audio interviews with several ball participants: Venus and Danni Xtravaganza, Dorian Corey, Junior Labeija, Octavia St. Laurent and others. The main self-funded shoot was the Paris is Burning ball in 1986.

From that footage, Livingston worked with editor Jonathan Oppenheim to edit a trailer, which was then used to obtain funding from some grants, including awards from the National Endowment for the Arts, the New York State Council on the Arts, the Paul Robeson Fund, and the Jerome Foundation. Finally, Madison Davis Lacy, the head of public TV station WNYC, saw the material and contributed $125,000 to the production. The producers still needed to raise additional funds to edit the film, which came primarily from executive producer Nigel Finch at the BBC-2 show Arena.

There was some follow-up production in 1989: to tell the story of voguing's entry into mainstream culture, and to tell the stories of Willi's international success as a dancer and of Venus Xtravaganza's murder, which remains unsolved to this day. The filmmakers also did an additional interview with Dorian Corey, talking about "executive realness", "shade", and "reading".

The documentary took seven years to complete due to production costs and difficulties in obtaining funding. Livingston edited the final cut down to 78 minutes from over 75 hours of footage, all shot on expensive 16mm film. After the film's completion, the producers still needed to raise funds to get permission to use the music played in the ballrooms. It cost almost as much to clear the music as it did to shoot and edit the entire film. The production team had to rely on 10 separate funding sources over the course of the project.

== Home video ==
In 2020, the Criterion Collection re-released Paris Is Burning on Blu-ray with features including new interviews and conversations with cast members, scholars, etc. The UCLA Film and Television Archive restored the film into a new 2K digital form. This was done in collaboration with the Sundance Institute and Outfest UCLA Legacy Project, under the supervision of Jennie Livingston. Also included is footage of a conversation betwern Livingston and Sol Pendavis, Freddie Pendavis, and filmmaker Thomas Allen Harris. In another interview, gay and lesbian film historian Jenni Olson shares her views and opinions on Paris Is Burning. The re-release also includes a 2005 audio commentary from Livingston, Freddie Pendavis, Willi Ninja, and film editor Jonathan Oppenheim. An episode of The Joan Rivers Show from 1991 with Livingston, Dorian Corey, Pepper Labeija, Freddie Pendavis, and Willi Ninja, is also included Michelle Parkerson's essay "Paris Is Burning: The Fire This Time" and Essex Hemphill's review of the film are also included in the re-release.

The re-release also includes over an hour of new outtakes. In one scene, Venus Xtravaganza is shown at her grandmother's house, detailing her goals and hopes for the future, as well as her devotion to her grandmother. Dorian Corey is shown getting ready for a ball as gunshots are heard outside. Dorian mentions to Livingston that this is a common occurrence. This is also one of the few times Livingston and the crew can be seen on screen.

== Reception and legacy ==
The film received overwhelmingly positive reviews from a number of mainstream and independent presses, remarkable at that time for a film on the LGBT community, given the enormous legal and cultural obstacles that they faced during the time period.

The film holds a score of 99% on Rotten Tomatoes based on 120 reviews, with an average rating of 8.1/10. The website's critical consensus reads, "Paris Is Burning dives into the '80s transgender subculture, with the understated camera allowing this world to flourish and the people to speak (and dance) for themselves." On Metacritic, the film has a score of 82 out of 100 based on 22 critic reviews, indicating "universal acclaim."

Terrence Rafferty of The New Yorker said the film was "a beautiful piece of work—lively, intelligent, exploratory .... Everything about Paris Is Burning signifies so blatantly and so promiscuously that our formulations – our neatly paired theses and antitheses – multiply faster than we can keep track of them. What's wonderful about the picture is that Livingston is smart enough not to reduce her subjects to the sum of their possible meanings..."

Filmmaker Michelle Parkerson, writing for The Black Film Review, called the film "a politically astute, historically important document of our precarious times."

Essex Hemphill, the poet known for his role in Marlon Riggs's film Tongues Untied, reviewed the film for The Guardian, celebrating how the documentary created a forum for the people in it to speak in their own voices, and writing: "Houses of silk and gabardine are built. Houses of dream and fantasy. Houses that bear the names of their legendary founders...Houses rise and fall. Legends come and go. To pose is to reach for power while simultaneously holding real powerlessness at bay."

In the Sight and Sound 2022 critics' poll to determine the greatest films of all time, Paris is Burning was ranked at 196th place.

Yet the film was not without detractors even after its initial release. Writing for Z Magazine, feminist writer bell hooks (Note: bell hooks' name is not capitalised. This was a choice when she created the pen-name, in order to differentiate herself from her great-grandmother and to put more emphasis on her writing than her person.) criticized the film for depicting the ritual of the balls as a spectacle to "pleasure" white spectators. Other authors such as Judith Butler and Phillip Harper have focused on the drag queens' desire to perform and present "realness". Realness can be described as the ability to appropriate an authentic gender expression. When performing under certain categories at the ball, such as school girl or executive, the queens are rewarded for appearing as close to the "real thing" as possible. A main goal amongst the contestants is to perform conventional gender roles while at the same time trying to challenge them.

hooks also questions the political efficacy of the drag balls themselves, citing her own experiments with drag, and suggesting that the balls themselves lack political, artistic, and social significance. hooks criticizes the production and questions gay men performing drag, suggesting that it is inherently misogynistic and degrading towards women. Butler responds to hooks' previous opinion that drag is misogynistic, stating in their book, Bodies that Matter: On the Discursive Limits of "Sex":

The problem with the analysis of drag as only misogyny is, of course, that it figures male-to-female transsexuality, cross-dressing, and drag as male homosexual activities — which they are not always — and it further diagnoses male homosexuality as rooted in misogyny.

Both hooks and Harper criticize the filmmaker, Jennie Livingston, who is Jewish, gender-nonconforming, and queer, for remaining visibly absent from the film. Although the viewers are able to hear Livingston a few times during the production, the director's physical absence while orchestrating the viewer's perspective, creates what hooks calls an "Imperial Oversee(r)".

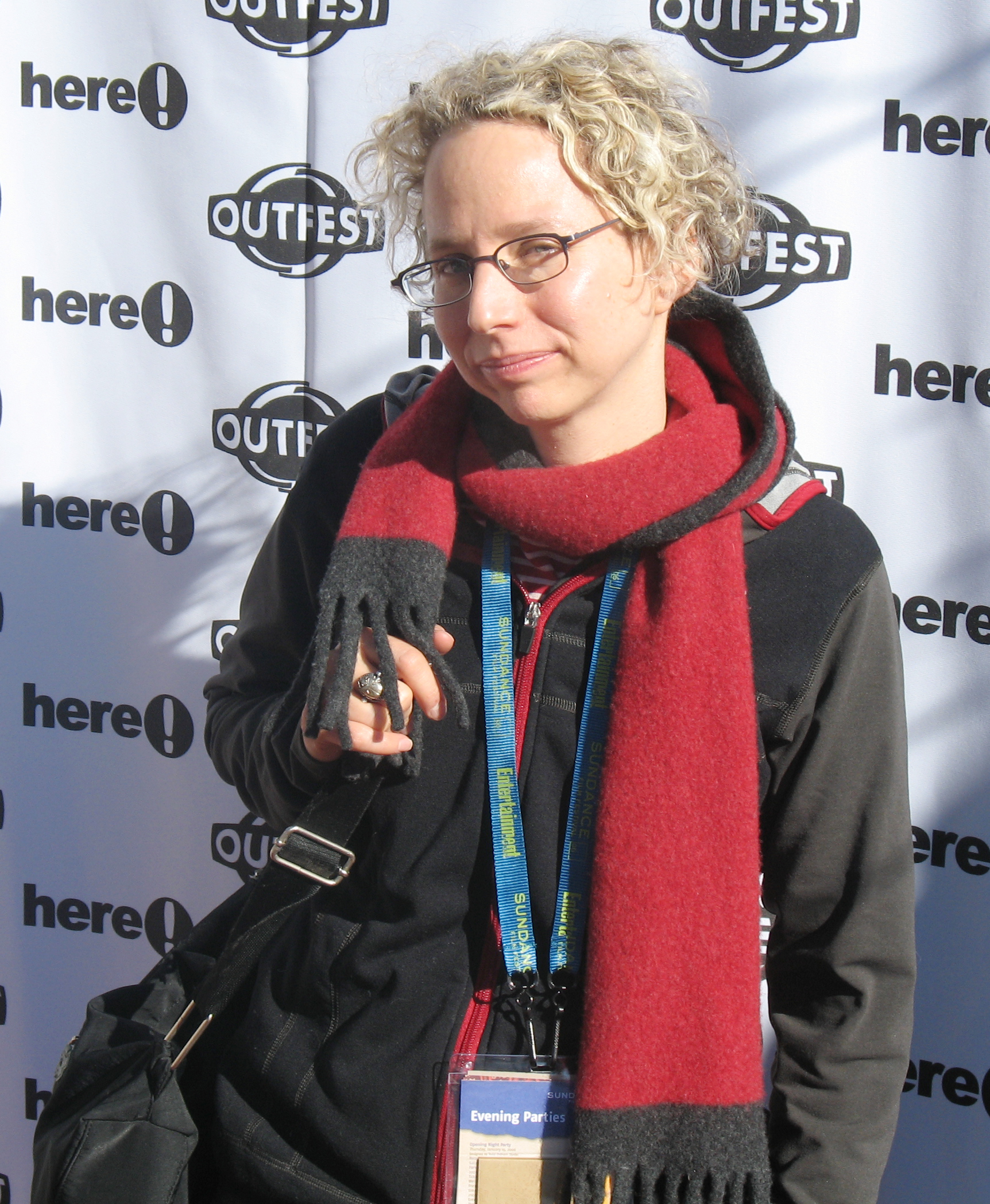
Jennie Livingston, director of Paris Is Burning

Livingston's visible absence from the film can be attributed to a style of documentary filmmaking called cinéma vérité, an approach in which the filmmaker remains off camera and observes the events unfolding onscreen. The goal of cinéma vérité filmmaking is to capture situations and events that occur naturally, without any input or direction from the filmmaker. Some scholars have argued that the use of cinéma vérité in Paris Is Burning makes the film appear ethnographic in nature. Ethnographic films are typically made by western filmmakers aiming to document the lives and practices of people belonging to non-western cultures. Ethnographic documentaries are often seen as problematic because they allow western filmmakers to put forth their representation of a group which they do not belong to, thereby manipulating audience perceptions of that group. In a similar way, Judith Butler argues that, by remaining off-camera, Livingston uses a shared sense of identity with the group she films (i.e., her queer identity) to "claim [...] a shared sense of marginalization" with them while simultaneously maintaining "phallic power" over them because she as the filmmaker decides how they will be portrayed.

In the years following the film's release, people have continued to speak and write about Paris Is Burning. In 2003, the New York Times reported that more than a decade after its release, Paris Is Burning remains a commonly cited and frequently used organizing tool for LGBT youth; a way for scholars and students to examine issues of race, class, and gender; a way for younger ball participants to meet their cultural ancestors; and a portrait of several remarkable Americans, almost all of whom have died since the film's production.

In 2013, UC Irvine scholar Lucas Hilderbrand wrote a history of the film, a book detailing its production, reception, and influence, Paris Is Burning, A Queer Film Classic (Arsenal Pulp Press). In 2007, writer Wesley Morris, in a print-only section for children for The New York Times, wrote "12 Films to See Before You Turn 13". The piece recommended kids see films like Princess Mononoke, The Wiz, and Do the Right Thing. About Paris Is Burning, Morris says "seeing [Livingston's] documentary as soon as possible means you can spend the rest of your life having its sense of humanity amuse, surprise, and devastate you, over and over."

Paris Is Burning is one of the main inspirations for the TV series Pose. Co-director Janet Mock has stated that Paris Is Burning introduced her to the ballroom community and positive representation of queer women of color like herself, but the storylines take place in parallel universes. Co-creator Steven Canals called Paris Is Burning an entry-level depiction of ballroom culture in the same interview, citing both bell hooks' and Judith Butlers' critiques of Jennie Livingston. He stated that the show's writing room differs from the story told in Paris Is Burning because it emphasizes the diverse racial and gender identity perspectives. Though Mock has said that the series doesn't directly reference storylines from Paris Is Burning, the episode "Butterfly/Cocoon" depicts some of the main characters mummifying and locking up a dead body in the same fashion as the body found in Dorian Corey's wardrobe. While Dorian Corey's real-life story is unknown, the dead body in the show is the result of a dominatrix's client's accidental overdose.

Wolfgang Busch's 2006 documentary How Do I Look is often considered a sequel to Paris Is Burning. It chronicles ball culture in Harlem and Philadelphia over ten years. It also features several members of the Paris Is Burning cast, including Pepper LaBeija, Willi Ninja, Octavia St. Laurent, Jose Xtravaganza, and Carmen Xtravaganza. Busch said in an interview, "I use How Do I Look as a tool to break down the stereotypes and create empowerment projects to help individuals or an entire community. Paris Is Burning exploited the ball community and a lot of other people, and the community were upset with Paris Is Burning."

=== Cast ===
- Brooke Xtravaganza
- Andre Christian
- Dorian Corey
- Paris Dupree
- Junior Labeija
- Willi Ninja
- Sandy Ninja
- Kim Pendavis
- Freddie Pendavis
- Sol Pendavis
- Avis Pendavis
- Octavia St. Laurent
- Stevie Saint Laurent
- Anji Xtravaganza
- Bianca Xtravaganza
- Danny Xtravaganza
- David Xtravaganza
- David Ian Xtravaganza
- David The Father Xtravaganza
- Venus Xtravaganza

† Reference source:

==== Uncredited or Archival Footage ====
- Eileen Ford—uncredited
- Jose Guitierez—uncredited
- Shari Headley
- Geoffrey Holder
- Fran Lebowitz
- Gwen Verdon
- Carmen Xtravaganza

=== Awards ===
- 1990 – IDA Award, International Documentary Association
- 1990 – LAFCA Award Best Documentary, Los Angeles Film Critics Association
- 1990 – Audience Award Best Documentary, San Francisco International Lesbian & Gay Film Festival
- 1991 – Grand Jury Prize Documentary, Sundance Film Festival
- 1991 – Teddy Award for Best Documentary Film, Berlin International Film Festival
- 1991 – Boston Society of Film Critics Awards (BSFC) Best Documentary
- 1991 – Open Palm Award, Gotham Awards
- 1991 – NYFCC Award Best Documentary, New York Film Critics Circle Awards
- 1991 – Golden Space Needle Award Best Documentary, Seattle International Film Festival
- 1992 – Outstanding Film (Documentary), GLAAD Media Awards
- 1992 – NSFC Award Best Documentary, National Society of Film Critics
- 2015 – Cinema Eye Honours Legacy Award
- 2016 – Added to the National Film Registry

=== Controversy ===
The film received funding from the National Endowment for the Arts during the period when the organization was under fire for funding controversial artists including Robert Mapplethorpe and Andres Serrano. Aware that publicity surrounding her project could result in revoked funding, Livingston avoided releasing many details about the project outside of her small circle of producers and collaborators.

Although there had been no agreement to do so, the producers planned to distribute approximately $55,000 (1/5 of the sale price of the film to Miramax) among 13 of the participants. While Dorian Corey and Willi Ninja were very happy to be paid for a film they'd understood was an unpaid work of nonfiction, several other film participants felt they were not properly compensated and thus retained an attorney, planning to sue for a share of the film's profits in 1991. When their attorney saw they had all signed standard model releases generated by WNYC Television, they did not sue and accepted payment. Paris Dupree had planned to sue for $40 million.

Responding to the financial dispute, Livingston has expressed that "there's no obligation, in a documentary, to pay your subjects," and that "the journalistic ethic says you should not pay them. On the other hand, these people are giving us their lives! How do you put a price on that?"

She states that she paid the principals as a matter of respect at a time when this was not commonly done, and she argues that they received considerably more than they would have received if they had been actors in an independently made drama feature.

Upon its release, the documentary received exceptionally good reviews from critics and won several awards including a Sundance Film Festival Grand Jury Prize, a Berlin International Film Festival Teddy Bear, an audience award from the Toronto International Film Festival, a GLAAD Media Award, a Women in Film Crystal Award, a Best Documentary award from the Los Angeles, New York, and National Film Critics' Circles, and it also was named as one of 1991's best films by the Los Angeles Times, The Washington Post, National Public Radio, Time magazine, and others.

In spite of the many positive reactions and film awards earned, Paris Is Burning did not receive an Academy Award nomination for Best Documentary Feature that year. This generated accusations that the Academy of Motion Picture Arts and Sciences was homophobic and transphobic.

== See also ==
- The Queen (1968 film)
- Kiki (2016 film)
