= Dale Blackheart Revlon =

American dancer, choreographer, and performance artist specializing in voguing

- Born: David Robert Leach Jr. November 12, 1987 (age 38)
- Occupations: Dancer; choreographer; community organizer
- Known for: First American ballroom legend deemed overseas
- Style: voguing

Dale Blackheart Revlon (born 1987) is an American dancer, choreographer, and performance artist specializing in voguing. Originally from Baltimore, he is known for his collaborations with French visual artist Frédéric Nauczyciel and the House of HMU, an interdisciplinary artistic collective that helped establish cultural exchanges between the Baltimore and Parisian ballroom communities in the early 2010s. In 2023, he was awarded the ballroom title of "Legend" by Jack Mizrahi in Paris, recognizing his two decades of involvement in ballroom culture. Since 2024, he has been based in Las Vegas, where he has contributed to the development of the local ballroom scene through dance education, community organizing, and the production of ballroom events.

== Early life ==
David Leach Jr., known professionally as Dale Blackheart Revlon, was born in Baltimore in 1987. He was introduced to ballroom culture at an early age through his mother, who taught him to dance after returning home from balls in the early morning hours. The ballroom community in turn became an important space for self-expression during his youth as a Black gay man in Baltimore.

In 2011, Dale met French visual artist and photographer Frédéric Nauczyciel at Club Bunns, a longstanding Black LGBTQ+ nightclub in Baltimore. Nauczyciel was undertaking an artistic residency exploring the connections between Baltimore's predominantly Black neighborhoods and the suburbs of Paris through performance practices such as voguing. Their meeting marked the beginning of a longstanding artistic collaboration, with Dale becoming a central figure in Nauczyciel's multidisciplinary work until the artist's death in December 2025.

== Ballroom career and House of Revlon ==
Emerging from Baltimore's ballroom scene, Dale Blackheart Revlon developed an international career as a voguing performer and choreographer, collaborating with artists across contemporary dance, music, and visual arts. He has studied and performed alongside choreographers Régine Chopinot and Andy de Groat, musicians Saul Williams and Abdu Ali, and visual artist Zoe Charlton, among others.

Beginning in 2011, Dale participated in a series of artistic and cultural exchanges between Baltimore and Paris through his collaboration with Frédéric Nauczyciel and the House of HMU. These exchanges brought members of Baltimore's established ballroom community into contact with the emerging Parisian ballroom scene, contributing to the development of transatlantic relationships between performers and houses. Among those involved were Vinii Revlon and Keiona Revlon, who subsequently established the French chapter of the House of Revlon, later becoming one of the most influential Houses across Europe and a pioneer in the global expansion of the Ballroom scene itself. The French house notably competed in the third season of HBO Max's reality competition series Legendary in 2022.

In November 2021, Dale and Vinii Revlon led Celebration, a public voguing workshop and miniball in Marseille, France. The event was held again in Toulon in December 2022, continuing their involvement in community-based ballroom programming in France.

In 2023, Dale was awarded the ballroom title of "Legend" by ballroom Icon Jack Mizrahi in Paris, recognizing his two decades of participation in ballroom culture. The recognition reflected his longstanding involvement with the House of Revlon and his artistic ties to the French ballroom community, including his collaboration with Vinii Revlon, the house's European Father.

In July 2025, Dale appeared in Ballroom, danser pour exister, a five-part documentary series directed by Amandine Gay and released by France Télévisions. Centered on members of the House of Revlon in Paris, the series explores identity, chosen family, community solidarity, and the personal experiences of performers within contemporary ballroom culture.

== Artistic career ==
=== The Fire Flies ===
Between 2011 and 2014, Dale appeared in The Fire Flies, a multidisciplinary video and performance project by Frédéric Nauczyciel documenting the underground ballroom and voguing scene among Black LGBTQ+ dancers in Baltimore. Works from the project were acquired by the Centre national des arts plastiques and presented at cultural institutions including the Centre Pompidou, MAC VAL, and Centquatre-Paris in France; the Théâtre de Vidy in Lausanne, Switzerland; and the Julie Meneret Gallery in New York.

=== Studio House of HMU ===
In 2013, Dale joined Frédéric Nauczyciel and a group of performers from Baltimore and Paris, including Keiona Revlon and Vinii Revlon, in establishing the Studio House of HMU, an interdisciplinary artistic collective exploring the relationship between French Baroque traditions and African American voguing. Within the collective, Dale performed in the film A Baroque Ball and co-wrote the solo dance performance CunTender. Both works were filmed at the Centre Pompidou in Paris and subsequently exhibited in cultural institutions across France.

In January 2020, Dale performed in Singulis et Simul, a multidisciplinary production by Frédéric Nauczyciel and the House of HMU developed in collaboration with musician Abdu Ali and the Cincinnati Symphony Orchestra. Premiering at Cincinnati Music Hall, the performance combined voguing, Baroque music, and orchestral accompaniment. The production was subsequently presented at several French cultural institutions in 2021 and 2022, including MC93 in Bobigny, Maison des Arts de Créteil, and Théâtre National de Bretagne in Rennes.

=== Artist residency at Cité Internationale des Arts ===
In 2022, Dale was selected for an artist residency at the Cité Internationale des Arts in Paris, where he continued developing his independent choreographic practice and organizing community activities centered on ballroom culture. During the residency, he created I'm Walking Tonight (2023), a solo performance exploring themes of personal journeys and self-confidence. On June 6, 2023, he presented the work at the Cité internationale des arts during the Danse en résistance : le patrimoine immatériel en mouvement (Dance as Resistance: Intangible Heritage in Motion) conference exploring dance as a form of resistance and cultural expression, organized by the Maison des Cultures du Monde.

During his residency, Dale also led a series of free public voguing workshops, which were featured in a television report by France24. He also hosted a presentation with photographer Chantal Regnault examining her photographic documentation of New York City's ballroom scene in Voguing and the House Ballroom Scene of New York City, 1989–92.

== Community organization in Las Vegas ==
Since 2024, Dale has helped to build upon the nascent ballroom scene in Las Vegas by teaching dance bootcamps at the LGBTQ+ Center of Las Vegas and organizing monthly balls. In July 2026, he was featured on the cover of QVegas, the largest and oldest LGBTQ+ publication in Nevada, for his community efforts toward bringing Ballroom to Vegas. In August 2026, his production company, Blackheart Productions, hosted the "Monday Mania Miniball" in Las Vegas, featuring a prominent panel of ballroom legends, including Vinii Revlon as guest commentator.
