= Vinii Revlon =

French dancer and choreographer specializing in voguing

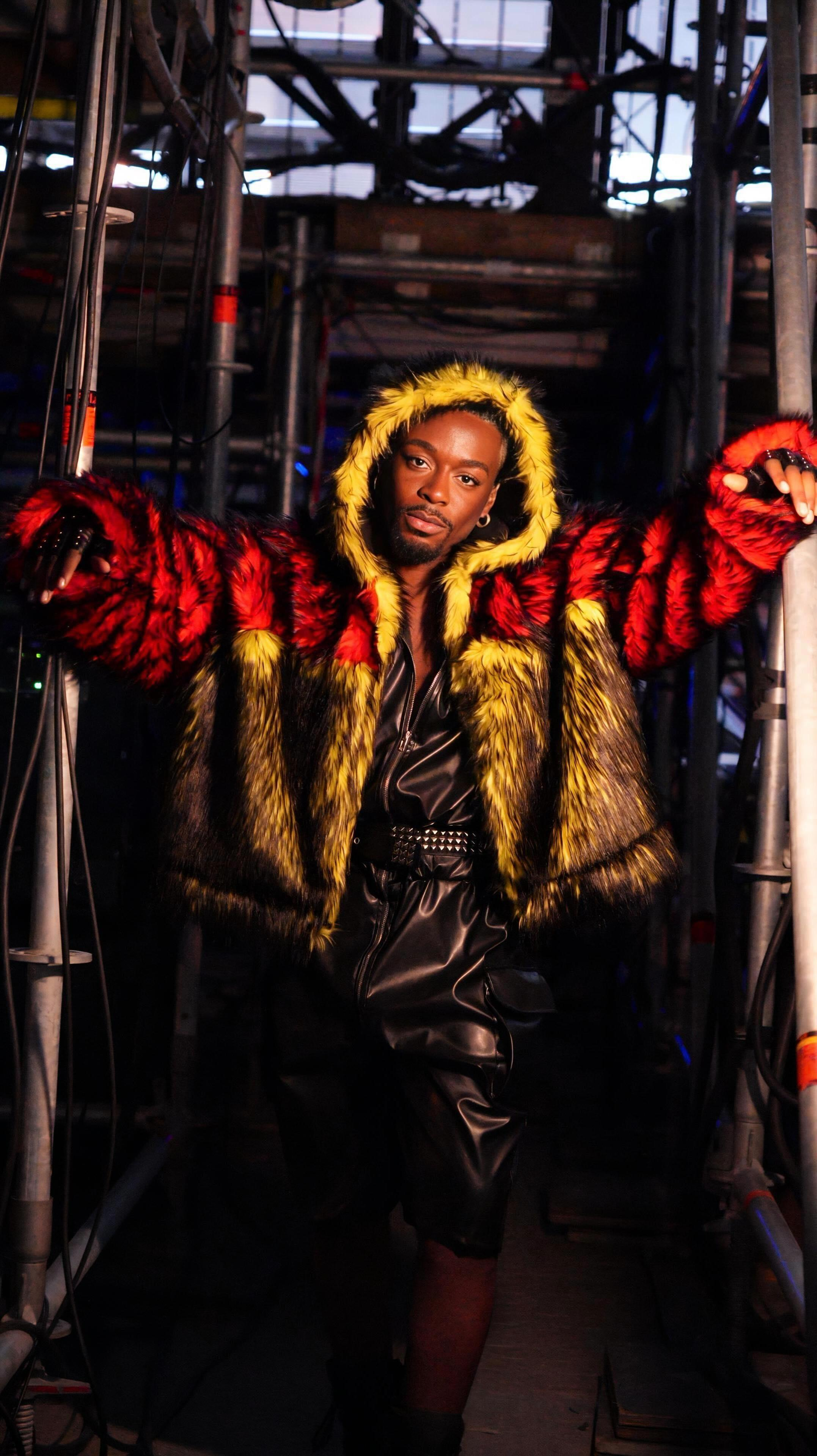
- Vinii Revlon at Stade de France (2026)
- Born: Vincent Loboko; December 23, 1991 (age 34)
- Occupations: Dancer; choreographer; producer; host
- Years active: 2013–present
- Known for: First European Legend in ballroom
- Style: voguing

Vinii Revlon (born in Paris in 1991) is a French dancer, choreographer, and performer specializing in voguing. A pioneer in the European ballroom community, he is recognized as Europe’s first Legend and serves as International Father of the House of Revlon. His work spans ballroom competition, contemporary dance, and popular entertainment, including appearances on HBO's Legendary, collaborations with Aya Nakamura, performances at the Opéra Bastille, and participation in the cultural programming of the 2024 Paris Olympic Games.

== Early life ==
Vincent Loboko, known by his stage name Vinii Revlon, was born in Paris in 1991. He developed an interest in dance at an early age, exploring various styles such as hip-hop and Afro dance. He later enrolled in professional dance programs to refine his technique.

== Ballroom career ==
=== House of Revlon ===
Vinii Revlon is a pioneering figure in the European ballroom community. He is the founder and Father of the French chapter of the House of Revlon, which he leads alongside its Mother, Keiona Revlon, winner of the second season of Drag Race France.

Vinii Revlon began voguing on the French ballroom scene in 2013. He organized workshops and gatherings to bring emerging dancers together and establish a stable community. In 2014, he traveled to the United States to participate in balls and international competitions, where he won several titles. This experience allowed him to become familiar with the codes and history of voguing directly from the culture's birthplace. By the time he returned to Europe in 2018, he gained recognition, enabling him to train a new generation of dancers. Vinii is the first European to attain Legend status, the third rank in the highly codified hierarchy—Star, Statement, Legend, Icon—an achievement he earned after a decade of dance competition in ballroom.

In ballroom culture, Vinii frequently serves as an MC (Master of Ceremonies) and commentator, providing the live vocal chants, rhythms, and energy that drive the music during major voguing balls. Since 2016, he has organized balls and dance workshops throughout the world, including the Fight for Your Rights Ball at the 2023 Lyon Dance Biennale and the global Voguing On Tour program. In 2025, he was the only European selected to judge the prestigious Revry World Pride Ball in Washington, DC.

=== Voguing on Tour and Paris Olympics ===
In 2017, Vinii approached Gaîté Lyrique to co-organize the Africa Ball, an event celebrating Afro-diasporic identities through performance and ballroom competition. Soon after, the Gaîté Lyrique offered the House of Revlon a weekly residency in its dance studio.

The collaboration expanded in 2021 with the launch of the Voguing on Tour program, which aimed to promote ballroom culture beyond Paris. The program has held mini-balls at venues including MUCEM in Marseille, Lille Opera, Le Lieu Unique in Nantes, Maison de la Radio in Paris, Intérieur Queer in Lyon, Halle Tropisme in Montpellier, and the Institut français in both Berlin and Myanmar.

In August 2024, Voguing on Tour culminated in the Paris Sports Ball, a three-date production staged at the Champions Park during the 2024 Paris Olympic Games. The event was attended by an international audience of 13,000 people and marked the first ever presentation of voguing within the context of the Olympic Games. In 2024, Vinii Revlon was appointed an associate artist of the Gaîté Lyrique, in recognition of the artistic and social impact of his work.

== Television career ==
In 2022, Vinii appeared with members of the House of Revlon in the third season of the HBO reality competition series Legendary. The permanent judges—Leiomy Maldonado, Law Roach, Jameela Jamil, and Keke Palmer—consistently ranked the house high, with the Revlons winning two episodes and placing third overall.

In July 2025, Vinii was the central figure and narrator of Ballroom, danser pour exister, a five-part documentary series directed by Amandine Gay and produced in collaboration with France Télévisions. Centered on members of the House of Revlon in Paris, the series explores identity, chosen family, community solidarity, and the personal experiences of performers within contemporary ballroom culture.

In August 2026, Vinii appeared as a guest judge on the 4th season of Drag Race France.

== Artistic career ==
=== Music and popular culture ===
In 2019, Vinii Revlon appeared in the music video for "Pookie" by French singer Aya Nakamura and subsequently performed as a dancer during her Paris concert tours. In May 2026, he reunited with Nakamura alongside other members of the ballroom community for her historic residency at Stade de France. Performing for a collective crowd of 240,000 attendees, Vinii shared the stage with an artist who shattered records as the first French-language singer to sell out the stadium for three consecutive nights.

In 2023, Vinii collaborated with Drag Race France winner Keiona and Gigi Palmer on the pop and ballroom single "Nuit."

Vinii has also contributed choreography and performances to Ubisoft's Just Dance video game series. For Just Dance 2023, he contributed to the choreography for "Anything I Do" by CLiQ featuring Ms Banks and Alika, appearing alongside fellow House of Revlon members Gigi Revlon and Keiona Revlon. He later contributed to the choreography for "Vogue (Ballroom Version)" in Just Dance 2025, a performance of Madonna's song featuring Gigi Revlon.

=== Studio House of HMU ===
In 2013, Vinii Revlon joined French visual artist Frédéric Nauczyciel and performers from the Baltimore and Paris ballroom communities, including Dale Blackheart Revlon and Keiona Revlon, in establishing the Studio House of HMU. The interdisciplinary collective developed artistic exchanges between France and the United States, exploring the relationship between French Baroque traditions and African American voguing through dance, film, and performance. During a residency at the Centre Pompidou in Paris, their early projects included A Baroque Ball (2013), a performance film featuring dancers from the Parisian ballroom scene.

Vinii subsequently participated in the creation of Singulis et Simul, a multidisciplinary production conceived by Nauczyciel, in collaboration with musician Abdu Ali and choreographed collectively by Studio House of HMU. Originally commissioned by the Cincinnati Symphony Orchestra in 2020, the work combined voguing, Baroque dance, Egyptian baladi, live music, and film. Vinii was credited as both a performer and Nauczyciel's assistant in the production's conception and visual direction. The production was subsequently presented at several French cultural institutions in 2021 and 2022, including MC93 in Bobigny, Maison des Arts de Créteil, and Théâtre National de Bretagne in Rennes.

In 2022, Vinii served as the curator for a House of HMU studio residency in Garges-lès-Gonesse, France. In collaboration with Nauczyciel, Vinii curated a dynamic program of invited artists—including choreographer Régine Chopinot—to explore collective celebration. Their curatorial vision focused on contextualizing participatory performance as a tool for cross-cultural, intergenerational, and gender-inclusive community engagement.

=== Opera performances ===
In 2019, Vinii performed alongside Mariana Benenge in Les Indes galantes, a production of Jean-Philippe Rameau's Baroque opera at the Opéra Bastille, directed by Clément Cogitore and choreographed by Bintou Dembélé. The production incorporated contemporary urban dance styles, including voguing, krumping, and hip-hop, into the eighteenth-century opera-ballet, bringing performers from France's street dance and ballroom communities into one of the country's principal opera institutions.

In 2026, Vinii reunited with choreographer Bintou Dembélé for Les Indes galantes – De la voix des âmes, a new stage adaptation of Rameau's opera conducted by Leonardo García-Alarcón. Developed with Dembélé's Structure Rualité, the production continued the artistic dialogue between Baroque music and contemporary urban dance established by the 2019 Opéra Bastille staging. Vinii toured internationally with the production in 2026, performing at venues including MC2 Grenoble in France and the Kölner Philharmonie in Germany.

== Awards and recognition ==
In 2025, Vinii received the Têtu Award for Mainstream LGBTQIA+ Representation for his work on the television documentary Ballroom, danser pour exister. In 2026, he received the Global Black Pride award for Cultural Impact.
