= Mariana Benenge =

Congolese-born dancer, choreographer and fashion designer based in Paris

- Born: July 1, 1998 (age 28)
- Occupations: Dancer; choreographer; fashion designer; activist

Mariana Benenge (born 1998), also known as Mariana Revlon, is a Congolese-born dancer, choreographer and fashion designer based in Paris. She is known for choreography that blends street dance styles like waacking and voguing with contemporary performance, notably through her collaborations with musical artists Aya Nakamura, Ghali, Tshegue, and Yseult. An active member of the Parisian ballroom scene, Benenge is also involved in feminist and LGBTQ+ advocacy, particularly concerning the visibility of Black and queer communities, gender-based harassment, and the creation of spaces outside the male gaze.

== Early life and education ==
Benenge was born in Democratic Republic of the Congo, in 1998, and is of Luba heritage. Her early exposure to dance was rooted in Luba traditions from the Kasai region, particularly mutuashi, characterized by rhythmic hip movements and pelvic isolations, as well as modern Congolese dance styles such as ndombolo.

Raised by her mother, Claudine Benenge, whom she has credited for her foundation in community values, she moved to France at the age of 12. While working part-time jobs from the age of 15, she completed her Baccalauréat in economics and social sciences. She subsequently enrolled in a dance academy, where she was introduced to waacking, and soon afterward discovered voguing through the Parisian ballroom scene. Both styles became central to her artistic practice.

== Career ==
=== Dance and choreography ===
Benenge's early freestyle footprint was established within the competitive Parisian ballroom scene and the street dance battle culture at Centquatre (104), where she trained in underground styles like krumping, waacking, hip-hop and voguing. This environment served as a transition to the competitive circuit, leading her to compete in underground battles across Europe, including the prominent freestyle street dance tournaments Red Bull Dance Your Style and Summer Dance Forever.

She subsequently transitioned into professional commercial spaces, working as a choreographer and movement director across music videos, live performances, and contemporary dance, most notably with musical artists including Aya Nakamura, Ghali, Tshegue, Yseult, Omah Lay, Lala &ce, Bonnie Banane, Corine, and Ehla. In the fashion and beauty industries, she has provided posing and movement direction for brands including Chanel, YSL Beauté, Maison Margiela and Isabel Marant.

=== Ballroom ===
Benenge is a member of the Paris chapter of the House of Revlon, an international ballroom house led by House Father Vinii Revlon and House Mother Keiona Revlon. Performing under the name Mariana Revlon, she competes in ballroom events across Europe and serves as an instructor and judge in categories including Runway, Fashion Killa, and Lip Sync.

In August 2024, Benenge competed in the Runway category at the Paris Sports Ball, held at Trocadéro during the 2024 Paris Olympic Games, the first ever presentation of ballroom culture within an Olympic framework before a live audience of 13,000 spectators. In July 2025, she appeared in Ballroom, danser pour exister, a five-part documentary series directed by Amandine Gay and released by France Télévisions. Centered on members of the House of Revlon in Paris, the series explores identity, chosen family, community solidarity, and the personal experiences of performers within contemporary ballroom culture.

=== Fashion design ===
In addition to dance, Benenge is an entrepreneur and fashion designer. In September 2020, she launched Tantine de Paris, an eco-responsible streetwear brand that debuted during Paris Fashion Week. Influenced by Congolese street fashion and La Sape—a tradition of Congolese dandyism—the brand utilizes faux furs, vinyl, and oversized silhouettes to blend Kinshasa's aesthetics with Parisian underground subculture.

== Selected performances and choreography ==
- 2019: Performed alongside Vinii Revlon in Les Indes galantes at Opéra Bastille in Paris. The production, choreographed by Bintou Dembélé and directed by Clément Cogitore, broke artistic ground by incorporating voguing into Baroque opera.
- 2023: Appeared as a principal dancer in Aya Nakamura's music video "Baby".
- 2023: Co-developed and performed in Portuguese choreographer Marga Alfeirão's contemporary dance work LOUNGE. The piece, exploring lesbian sensuality and rest, received the Young Choreographers’ Award at the ImPulsTanz Vienna International Dance Festival.
- 2023: Performed alongside French alt-pop singer Bonnie Banane at the Petit Palais in Paris.
- 2024: Served as artistic director and choreographer for French afropunk band Tshegue's music video "Sing My Song".
- 2025: Choreographed French rapper Lala &ce's performance of “Biaga” at music awards ceremony Les Flammes.
- 2025: Choreographed Omah Lay's performance at the Couleur Café 2025 festival in Brussels.
- 2025: Choreographed Italian rapper Ghali's conceptual concert Gran Teatro at Fiera Milano Live, featuring over 50 performers and blending high-fashion, narrative theater and live music.
- 2026: Choreographed the "FREAK" music video by French singer Yseult.

== Activism and advocacy ==
Benenge is openly lesbian and is involved in intersectional feminist and LGBTQ+ advocacy, particularly around the representation of Black and queer communities and the prevention of gender-based harassment. In 2022, she co-founded "Trop c'est trop", an anti-harassment collective dedicated to combating public street harassment in Paris. She has also served as an ambassador for the LGBTQ+ rights organization Oasis Congo and the French intersectional feminist organizations Safe Place and En avant toute(s), which provide support to women and LGBTQ+ youth experiencing domestic or gender-based violence.

In June 2022, Benenge co-founded Pulse, a Paris-based nightlife event and collective curated specifically for FLINTA (Female, Lesbian, Intersex, Non-binary, Trans, and Agender) and BIPOC individuals to establish creative social spaces free from the male gaze. In February 2026, she participated in Queer Gaze, a panel discussion at the Grand Palais, organized in connection with artist Mickalene Thomas's exhibition All About Love. Alongside art historian Anne Lafont, Benenge discussed the queer gaze and the representation of Black women's bodies in art.
