= Legendary season 3 =

Third season of 'Legendary'

Legendary
- Season 3
- Hosted by: Dashaun Wesley
- Judges: Leiomy Maldonado; Law Roach; Keke Palmer; Jameela Jamil
- No. of contestants: 10
- Winner: House of Juicy Couture
- Runner-up: House of Yamamoto
- No. of episodes: 10

Release
- Original network: HBO Max
- Original release: May 19 – June 9, 2022

Season chronology
- ← Previous; Season 2

The third and final season of the American voguing competition series Legendary premiered on May 19, 2022. This season Jameela Jamil, Law Roach and Leiomy Maldonado remained on the panel of judges, Megan Thee Stallion was replaced with Keke Palmer. The superior house after ten episodes wins a cash prize of 100,000 dollars.

== Contestants ==
House	Contestant	Outcome
Kiki House of Juicy Couture	Brooklyn Juicy Couture	Winner
Kiki House of Juicy Couture	Father Day Day Juicy Couture	Winner
Kiki House of Juicy Couture	DYU Juicy Couture	Winner
Kiki House of Juicy Couture	Kimiyah Juicy Couture	Winner
Kiki House of Juicy Couture	Lolita Juicy Couture (Note: Appeared as a Super Villain Challenger in Season 1, Episode 7 for Capes & Tights Ball.)	Winner
House of Yohji Yamamoto	Mother Aoki Yamamoto	Runner-up
House of Yohji Yamamoto	Divo Yamamoto	Runner-up
House of Yohji Yamamoto	Golden Yamamoto	Runner-up
House of Yohji Yamamoto	Linda Yamamoto	Runner-up
House of Yohji Yamamoto	Luz Yamamoto	Runner-up
House of Revlon	Gigi Revlon	3rd
House of Revlon	Mother Keiona Revlon	3rd
House of Revlon	Kobe Revlon	3rd
House of Revlon	Nunoy Revlon	3rd
House of Revlon	Father Vinii Revlon	3rd
House of Makaveli	Goldie Makaveli	4th
House of Makaveli	Mother Jada Makaveli	4th
House of Makaveli	Mara Makaveli	4th
House of Makaveli	Raja Makaveli	4th
House of Makaveli	Smokiie Makaveli	4th
House of Alpha Omega	Adam Alpha Omega	5th
House of Alpha Omega	Rebel Alpha Omega	5th
House of Alpha Omega	Father Renaldo Alpha Omega	5th
House of Alpha Omega	Tahj Alpha Omega	5th
House of Alpha Omega	Treyon Alpha Omega	5th
House of LaBeija	Aja LaBeija	6th
House of LaBeija	Frida LaBeija	6th
House of LaBeija	Jelani LaBeija	6th
House of LaBeija	Father Soho LaBeija	6th
House of LaBeija	Zenith LaBeija	6th
House of Ada	Babi Ada	7th
House of Ada	Father Papi Ada	7th
House of Ada	Sophora Ada	7th
House of Ada	Vanity Ada	7th
House of Ada	Virgo Ada	7th
House of Alain Mikli	Alex Alain Mikli	8th
House of Alain Mikli	Father Papi Alain Mikli	8th
House of Alain Mikli	Summer Alain Mikli	8th
House of Alain Mikli	Sparkle Alain Mikli	8th
House of Alain Mikli	Nunu Alain Mikli	8th
House of Du'Mure-Versailles	Mother Aaliyah Kiara Du'Mure-Versailles	9th/10th
House of Du'Mure-Versailles	Christian Du'Mure-Versailles	9th/10th
House of Du'Mure-Versailles	Cotton Du'Mure-Versailles	9th/10th
House of Du'Mure-Versailles	Ken Du'Mure-Versailles	9th/10th
House of Du'Mure-Versailles	Lash Du'Mure-Versailles	9th/10th
House of Lyght	Cmonni Lyght	9th/10th
House of Lyght	Danny Lyght	9th/10th
House of Lyght	Maxima Lyght	9th/10th
House of Lyght	Rigo Lyght	9th/10th
House of Lyght	Father Ryku Lyght	9th/10th

== House progress ==
House	1	2	3	4	5	6	7	8	9	10
House of Juicy Couture		HIGH	HIGH	WIN	WIN	WIN	HIGH	WIN	WIN	Winner
House of Yohji Yamamoto		HIGH	HIGH	SAFE	GAG	HIGH	SAFE	HIGH	BTM2	Runner-up
House of Revlon	HIGH		WIN	HIGH	HIGH	SAFE	WIN	BTM2	ELIM	
House of Makaveli	BTM2		BTM2	BTM2	HIGH	BTM2	LOW	ELIM		
House of Alpha Omega	HIGH		SAFE	GAG	BTM2	ELIM				
House of LaBeija	SAFE		GAG	SAFE	ELIM					
House of Ada		BTM2	SAFE	ELIM						
House of Alain Mikli		LOW	ELIM							
House of Du'Mure-Versailles		ELIM								
House of Lyght	ELIM									

Table Key
The house won Legendary
The house was the runner-up
The house won the ball and was declared the superior house of the episode
The House receive the Gag Flag from a Judge, was declared immune for the episode and was declared the superior house of the episode
The House receive the highest score in the grand march and was declared safe
The house won one of the categories or received a high score from the judges and was declared safe
The House receive the Gag Flag from a Judge and was declared immune for the episode
The house received critiques from the judges and was declared safe
The house received a low score but was declared safe
The house was in the bottom two
The house was eliminated

== House scores ==
Scores Order: Keke + Leiomy + Law + Jameela + Guest Judge (+ Challenge Win)= Total Score

House	1	2	3	4	5	6	7	8	9	10
Kiki House of Juicy Couture		8+8+8+8=32	10+9+9+9+10=47	10+10+10+10+10=50	9+9+9+9+9(+5)=50	10+10+10+10+10(+5)=55	47	10+10+10+10+10(+10)=60	10+10+10+10+10=50	20+40=60
House of Yohji Yamamoto		8+8+7+9=32	9+8+10+8+10=45	8+7+8+7+8=38	7+7+7+6+7=34	10+9+10+9+10=48	43	9+9+9+9+10=46	8+7+8+8+7(+10)=48	15+35=50
House of Revlon	8+9+9+9=35		10+9+9+10+10=48	9+9+8+9+9(+5)=49	8+8+7+8+8=39	9+9+9+10+10=47	49	8+9+8+8+9=42	9+9+9+8+8=43	
House of Makaveli	6+5+6+6=23		7+6+7+6+7=33	6+5+4+5+7=27	8+8+9+7+7=39	10+7+8+7+7=39	40	6+8+9+7+8= 38		
House of Alpha Omega	9+9+9+10=37		9+8+8+8+8=41	6+6+9+7+7=35	7+8+4+8+6=33	9+8+7+9+9=42				
House of LaBeija	8+7+8+7=30		6+4+6+6+8=30	8+7+8+8+8=39	8+7+6+7+8=36					
Kiki House of Ada		8+6+5+9=28	9+7+8+8+10=42	7+6+8+8+8=37						
House of Alain Mikli		6+6+7+9=28	6+6+7+6+9=34							
House of Du'Mure-Versailles		5+5+4+6=20								
House of Lyght	5+3+6+5=19									

The house received the highest score in the episode.
The house received the lowest score in the episode.
The house received the lowest score in the episode and was declared immune after receiving a GAG FLAG from one of the judges.
The house received the second to lowest score in the episode and was declared immune after receiving a GAG FLAG from one of the judges.
The house received the highest score in the episode and was declared immune after receiving a GAG FLAG from one of the judges.

== Vogue redemption battles ==
Episode	Bottom Two Houses			Eliminated
1	House of Lyght	vs	House of Makaveli	House of Lyght
1	Father Ryku Light	vs	Mara Makaveli	House of Lyght
2	House of Ada	vs	House of Du'Mure-Versailles	House of Du'Mure-Versailles
2	Virgo Ada	vs	Cotton Du'Mure-Versailles	House of Du'Mure-Versailles
3	House of Makaveli	vs	House of Alain Mikli	House of Alain Mikli
3	Goldie Makaveli	vs	Summer Alain Mikli	House of Alain Mikli
4	House of Makaveli	vs	House of Ada	House of Ada
4	Mother Jada Makaveli	vs	Father Papi Ada	House of Ada
5	House of Alpha Omega	vs	House of LaBeija	House of LaBeija
5	Father Renaldo Alpha Omega	vs	Zenith LaBeija	House of LaBeija
6	House of Makaveli	vs	House of Alpha Omega	House of Alpha Omega
6	Goldie Makaveli	vs	Adam Alpha Omega	House of Alpha Omega
8	House of Makaveli	vs	House of Revlon	House of Makaveli
8	Mother Jada Makaveli	vs	Gigi Revlon	House of Makaveli
9	House of Yamamoto	vs	House of Revlon	House of Revlon
9	Divo Yamamoto	vs	Mother Keiona Revlon	House of Revlon

== Episodes ==
The season will consist of ten episodes, with each week airing three episodes on the same day.

No. overall	No. in season	Title	Original release date
20	1	"The Grand March Part. I"	May 19, 2022
Challenge: Houses must make their first impression by choreographing and performing a presentation true to their house with five elements of vogue.; Highest Scoring House: House of Alpha Omega; Bottom Two: House of Makaveli & House of Lyght; Eliminated: House of Lyght
21	2	"The Grand March Part. II"	May 19, 2022
Challenge: Houses must make their first impression by choreographing and performing a presentation true to their house with five elements of vogue.; Highest Scoring Houses: Kiki House of Juicy Couture & House of Yohji Yamamoto; The Houses of Ada and Alain Mikli tied by receiving the second to lowest score of the night. After deliberation from the judges, House of Alain Mikli was declared safe. House of Ada fell in the bottom two with House of Du'Mure-Versailles.: Bottom Two: House of Ada & House of Du'Mure-Versailles; Eliminated: House of Du'Mure-Versailles
22	3	"Animal Queendom"	May 19, 2022
Guest Judge: Anitta; Challenge: Houses must take the features of an animal to choregraph and perform a presentation that includes the 360° spin and dip move created by Leiomy Maldonado.; Highest Scoring House: House of Revlon; Superior House of the Week: House of Revlon; The House of LaBeija received the lowest score during this episode, but was declared safe after receiving a Gag Flag from Keke Palmer. House of Alain Mikli, which received the third to lowest score of the night, fell in the bottom two with the House of Makaveli.: Bottom Two: House of Alain Mikli & House of Makaveli; Eliminated: House of Alain Mikli
23	4	"Whorror House Ball"	May 26, 2022
Guest Judge: Issa Rae; Challenge: The remaining seven houses tell their most chilling stories through hand performance. Actor, writer, and producer Issa Rae helps the judges dole out their first 10s across the board.; Highest Scoring House: Kiki House of Juicy Couture; Second Challenge: Butch Queen Up In Drag Runway; Second Challenge Winner: House of Revlon; Superior House of the Week: Kiki House of Juicy Couture; The House of Alpha Omega received the second to lowest score during this episode, but was declared safe after receiving a Gag Flag from Law Roach. House of Ada, which received the third to lowest score of the night, fell in the bottom two with the House of Makaveli.: Bottom Two: House of Ada & House of Makaveli; Eliminated: House of Ada
24	5	"Anime"	May 26, 2022
Guest Judge: Bob The Drag Queen; Challenge: With the art of anime serving as inspiration, the houses are tasked with creating their own ultimate fight scenes, which must incorporate martial arts and an element of ballroom assigned by the current reigning champs.; Highest Scoring House: Kiki House of Juicy Couture; Second Challenge: Beat to Beat; Second Challenge Winner: Kiki House of Juicy Couture; Superior House of the Week: Kiki House of Juicy Couture; The House of Yohji Yamamoto received the second to lowest score during this episode, but was declared safe after receiving a Gag Flag from Jameela Jamil. House of LaBeija, which received the third to lowest score of the night, fell in the bottom two with the House of Alpha Omega.: Bottom Two: House of LaBeija & House of Alpha Omega; Eliminated: House of LaBeija
25	6	"Mission Impossiball"	May 26, 2022
Guest Judge: Jake Wesley Rogers; Challenge: The five houses have one mission: pull off a classic heist with a costume change, clever disguise or quick escape while a specialist serves soft and sensual vogueing - before selecting one house member to execute the old style of vogue.; Highest Scoring House: Kiki House of Juicy Couture; Second Challenge: Old Way with a Floor Performance; Second Challenge Winner: Kiki House of Juicy Couture; Superior House of the Week: Kiki House of Juicy Couture; Bottom Two: House of Makaveli & House of Alpha Omega; Eliminated: House of Alpha Omega
26	7	"Fairytale Money Ball"	June 2, 2022
Guest Judge: Leslie Jones; Challenge: This season’s first moneyball sees the houses attempt to enchant the judges with fairytale-inspired performances, synchronized formations, and innovative new stunts.; Cash prize : $15.000; Highest Scoring House: House of Revlon; Second Challenge: Three Fab Mice; Cash prize : $10.000; Second Challenge Winner: Kiki House of Juicy Couture; Third Challenge: Tweedle Dee Tweedle Stunts; Cash prize : $5.000; Third Challenge Winner: House of Revlon; Superior House of the Week: House of Revlon; Bottom Two: None; Eliminated: None
27	8	"Hot in the Shade Ball"	June 2, 2022
Guest Judge: Kelly Rowland; Challenge: It’s all fun in the sun until the houses throw shade in a beachy all-house performance before sending their sexiest sirens down the runway. Then, houses face off in a hand and arm control-focused challenge.; Highest Scoring House: Kiki House of Juicy Couture; Second Challenge: Sex Siren; Second Challenge Winner: Kiki House of Juicy Couture; Third Challenge: Octo-Puss-Puss; Third Challenge Winner: Kiki House of Juicy Couture; Superior House of the Week: Kiki House of Juicy Couture; Bottom Two: House of Makaveli & House of Revlon; Eliminated: House of Makaveli
28	9	"Slayground Playground Ball"	June 2, 2022
Guest Judge: Dominique Jackson; Challenge: The remaining three houses head back to school for a playground-themed ball. Later, duos duckwalk and catwalk in a baton pass before one member struts down the runway while incorporating a hop, skip, and a jump.; Highest Scoring House: Kiki House of Juicy Couture; Second Challenge: Duck Walk Goose; Second Challenge Winner: House of Yohji Yamamoto; Third Challenge: Runway the Funway; Third Challenge Winner: House of Yohji Yamamoto; Superior House of the Week: Kiki House of Juicy Couture; Bottom Two: House of Yohji Yamamoto & House of Revlon; Eliminated: House of Revlon
29	10	"Hip-Opera Ball"	June 9, 2022
Catwalk: Day Day Juicy Couture vs Aoki Yamamoto; Catwalk Winner: Day Day Juicy Couture (Kiki House of Juicy Couture); Hand Performance: Kimiyah Juicy Couture vs Luz Yamamoto; Hand Performance Winner: Kimiyah Juicy Couture (Kiki House of Juicy Couture); Duckwalk: Brooklyn Juicy Couture vs Divo Yamamoto; Duckwalk Winner: Divo Yamamoto (House of Yohji Yamamoto); Floor Performance: Lolita Juicy Couture vs Golden Yamamoto; Floor Performance Winner: Lolita Juicy Couture (Kiki House of Juicy Couture) and Golden Yamamoto (House of Yohji Yamamoto); Spins and Dips: DYU Juicy Couture vs Linda Yamamoto; Spins and Dips Winner: DYU Juicy Couture (Kiki House of Juicy Couture) and Linda Yamamoto (House of Yohji Yamamoto); Runner-up: House of Yohji Yamamoto; Winner of Legendary Season Three: Kiki House of Juicy Couture
