= Idan Matalon =

Israeli video blogger, journalist, and business executive

- עידן מטלון
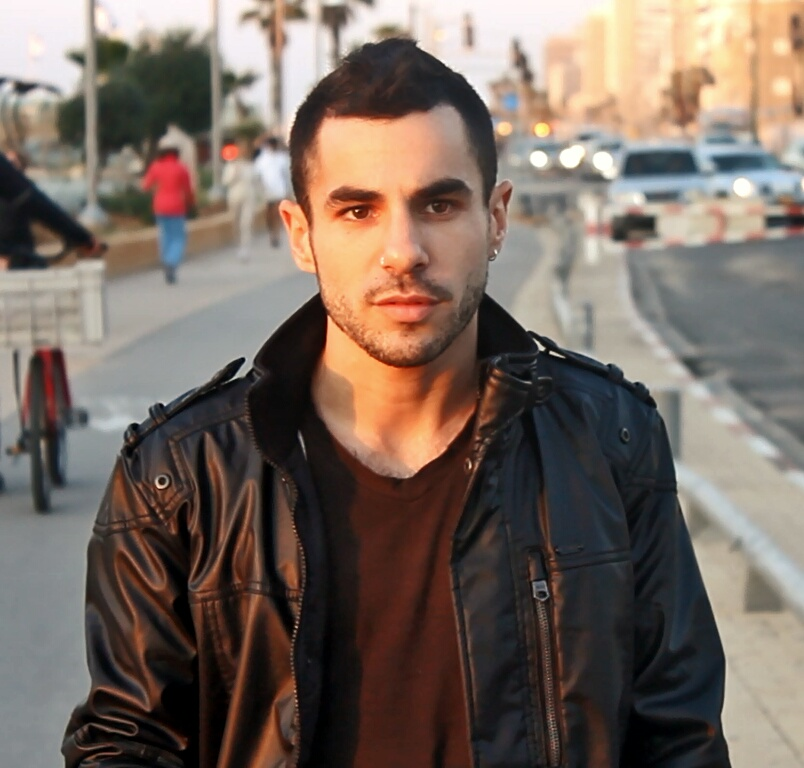
- Matalon in 2013
- Born: November 1, 1988 (age 37); Rishon LeZion, Israel
- Occupations: Journalist/columnist, VP of marketing for Moovz, video blogger, model
- Children: 1

Idan Matalon (Hebrew: עידן מטלון; born November 1, 1988) is an Israeli video blogger, journalist, video and audio producer, and business executive. Currently known as a columnist for the Israeli website mako, he is also vice president of marketing for the LGBT global social network Moovz. After completing his military service, Matalon started video blogging around 2010, with Out Traveler later describing him as an "online lipsync star." As a model, online personality, or gay activist he has been featured by magazines such as NRG, À cause des garçons, Stubborn Magazine, Nexter, and MyGayTrip, who also hired him in 2012 to serve as the main face of their advertising. In April 2012, the publication Shalom Life named him no. 20 in their list of the Top 50 Hottest Jewish Men.

== Early life ==
Idan Matalon was born in the city of Rishon LeZion, Israel. He spent his childhood at his parents' home in Gan Yavne, a town near the city of Ashdod. When he was sixteen he started lipsyncing to pop songs and posting the videos on YouTube, only to have his account closed for copyright issues. He joined the Israeli Defense Force in his teens, and after working in a number of positions, he moved to Tel Aviv in 2010.

== Career ==
=== 2010-12: Early videos and modeling ===
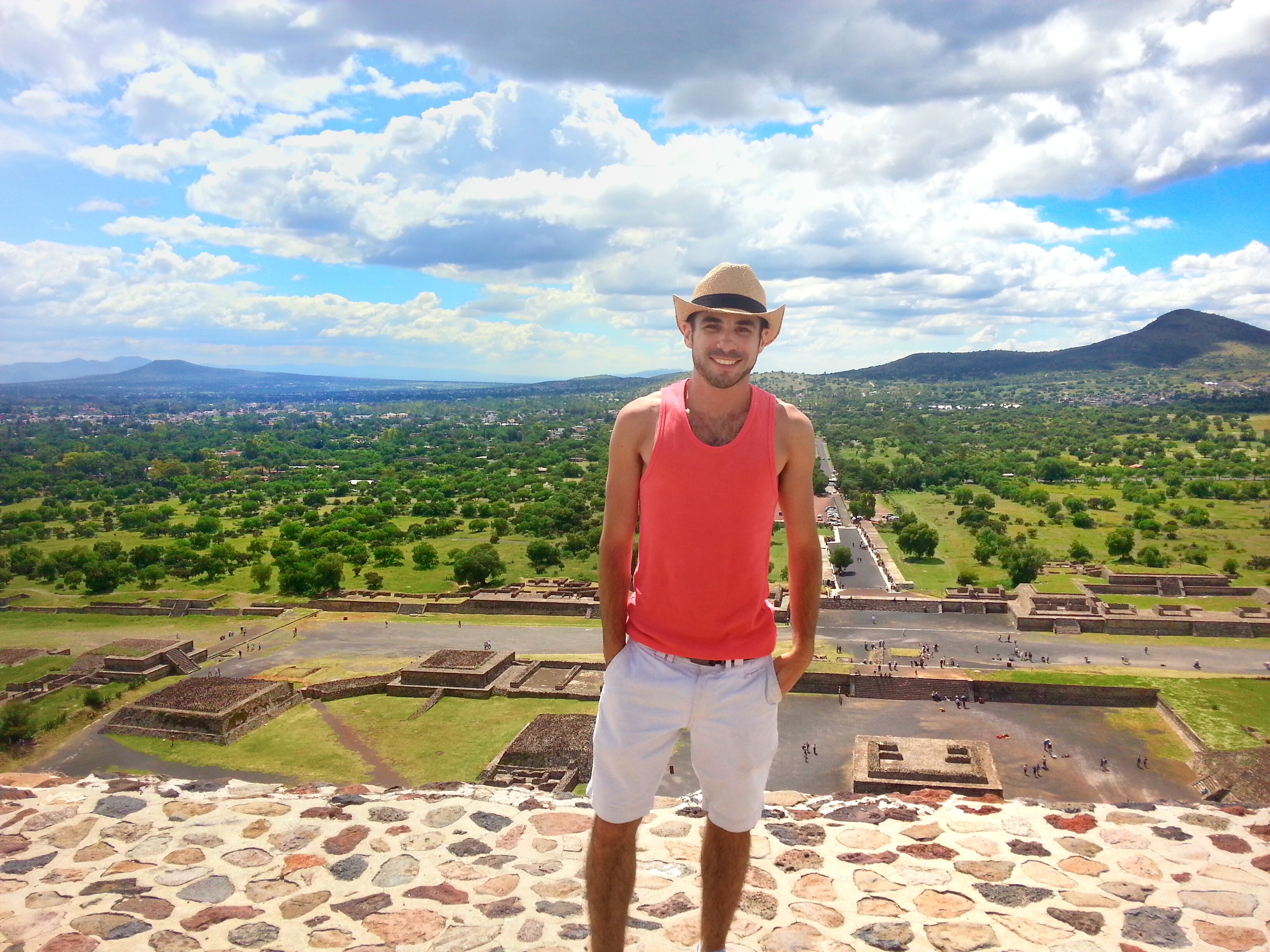
Matalon is known for filming lipsyncing videos both in Tel Aviv and internationally.

According to Gay.net, it was around 2010 that Matalon again began uploading self-made videos to YouTube, often featuring him and friends lipsyncing to pop songs around Tel Aviv. As the videos grew in popularity, Out Traveler dubbed him an "online lipsync star," describing one of his typical videos as "[Matalon] dancing around Tel Aviv street corners while lipsyching to Korean pop music." Matalon continued to upload videos into 2012, also beginning to film street interviews and talk about diverse topics. Around 2012 he was also working as a party line owner at the club Evita, a youth coordinator at the Bat Yam community center, and a coordinator of military preparation schools in Bat Yam.

As he garnered more attention online, Matalon was approached by a number of publications to work as a model. In France he has been featured in publications such as À cause des garçons, Stubborn Magazine, and MyGayTrip, who also hired him in 2012 to serve as the main face of their advertising. With MyGayTrip's founder Matthew Jost dubbing him the website's "muse," Matalon was subsequently featured as the main model in a number of full-page ads in Têtu. He has also been covered by publications in Canada, the United States, Mexico, and Israel, and in 2012 was featured in an article by NRG. In April 2012 the publication Shalom Life named him no. 20 in their list of the Top 50 Hottest Jewish Men, and later that year a video compiled by Matalon was featured in the magazine Nexter.

=== 2012: "Love Fest Tel Aviv" ===
External videos
- Idan Matalon & Lihi Admon - "Love Fest Tel Aviv" (Official Music Video)

Matalon debuted his first music video, "Love Fest Tel Aviv," on Yedioth Ahronoth in December 2012. Featuring Lihi Admon and Sean Barkat, the single was officially released on December 31, 2012. Matalon stated to Ynet that the video was dedicated to the open culture of Tel Aviv, with the message that Tel Aviv is a city of freedom and love.

=== 2012-14: Moovz and mako ===
As of 2012 he is a columnist on LGBT issues for mako, an online website operated by Keshet Broadcasting. In both text and video format he has covered topics such as HIV and World AIDS Day, gender norms, and the gay community in Tel Aviv. From 2013 on he has continued to video blog independently as well, and in late 2013 he produced a video expressing support for the gay community in Israel. Mexican website SDPNoticias.com named him three of the Top 5 Gay Bloggers of 2013, and in October 2013 he was featured as the cover model for Betún Magazine in Mexico. He was named a "top 10 supporter of Israel" in 2013 by the Canadian blog SizeDoesn'tMatter.

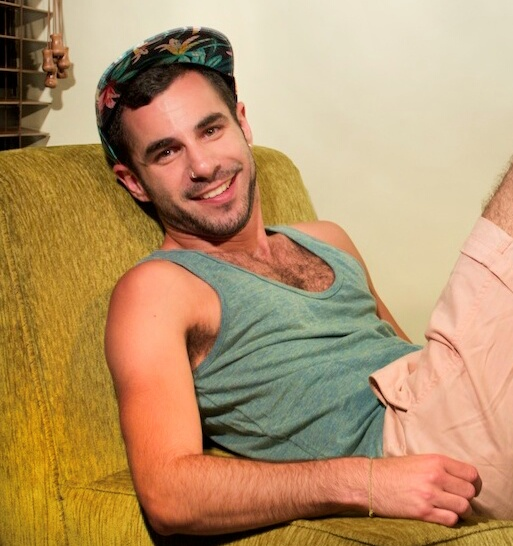
Matalon in 2013, photographed by Dekel Lazimi

Matalon joined the Israeli start-up Interacting Technology in 2012 as their VP of marketing, with Matalon working on marketing campaigns and managing the "brand ambassadors" for the global social network MOOVZ, which is owned by Interacting By April 2013 he organized an event to support Moovz in Israel, with fifteen international "ambassadors" participating. He has produced videos for the company as well, and traveled in July 2013 to fifteen countries over 28 days for the official Moovz campaign. As of May 2014, Divany in Hungary reported that Moovz had been dubbed "the gay Facebook" by journalists. In August 2014 Matalon was interviewed by Hungarian publication SZombat.

== Personal life ==
Openly gay since age nineteen, Matalon came out spontaneously to his parents while still in military service, meeting with support from both.

On July 3, 2021, Matalon became a father and welcomed his first daughter, Alma.

== Discography ==
=== Singles ===
Songs by Idan Matalon
Year	Title	Album	Release details
2012	"Love Fest Tel Aviv" (ft. Lihi Admon and Sean Barkat)	Single only	Self-released (Dec 31, 2012)

On February 8, 2020, Idan Matalon released an LGBT song in Spanish on Youtube, titled Me Vale

== See also ==
- Eliad Cohen
- Chris Salvatore
