= Jack Mizrahi =

American ballroom emcee, writer, and producer

- Born: May 28, 1972 (age 54); New York City, U.S.
- Occupations: Ballroom emcee; Television producer; Television writer; LGBTQ activist
- Years active: 1992–present
- Known for: Co-founder of House of Gorgeous Gucci; Producer on Legendary; Consultant and writer for Pose

Jack Mizrahi, also known as Jack Gorgeous Gucci, is an American ballroom emcee, writer, producer, and influential figure in ballroom culture. Mizrahi is the co-founder of the House of Gorgeous Gucci and has served as a co-executive producer on HBO Max's Legendary and as a writer and consultant for FX's Pose.

== Early life and background ==
Mizrahi was born and raised in New York City, the son of Haitian immigrants. Growing up in Queens, he developed a passion for entertainment, inspired notably by professional wrestling announcers. Mizrahi first encountered the ballroom scene in 1992, attending his first ball and joining the House of Mizrahi shortly thereafter.

== Ballroom career ==
Mizrahi quickly became a prominent figure within the House of Mizrahi, contributing significantly as an organizer and emcee. He co-established the New York Awards Ball and the ballroom Hall of Fame in 1993, institutions aimed at honoring ballroom pioneers. Mizrahi gained notoriety as an emcee for his dynamic commentary style, blending influences from professional wrestling, hip-hop, and traditional ballroom commentary. He is credited with popularizing certain ballroom phrases and nicknames, notably coining the title “Wonder Woman of Vogue” for Leiomy Maldonado. He mainly works in Harlem, Manhattan.

In late 2019, Mizrahi co-founded the House of Gorgeous Gucci, frequently referred to as the Gorgeous House of Gucci, serving as its founding father. The house gained additional prominence after appearing in the HBO Max series ‘‘Legendary’’.

== Contributions to ballroom culture ==
Mizrahi's contributions include institutionalizing ballroom history, creating the ballroom Hall of Fame, and innovating emceeing techniques that have defined modern ballroom commentary. His advocacy emphasizes protecting ballroom from exploitation and preserving its authenticity. Mizrahi has also served as a mentor, promoting self-confidence and community values.

== Television work ==
Mizrahi contributed to the authenticity of ballroom representation on television, notably with FX's drama series ‘‘Pose’’, where he consulted and later became a writer and made several on-screen appearances. The Emmy-winning character Pray Tell, portrayed by Billy Porter, was directly inspired by Mizrahi's real-life emceeing persona.

On HBO Max's ‘‘Legendary’’, Mizrahi served as a co-executive producer and primary ballroom consultant. He was instrumental in designing the show's competitive format, creating categories, and ensuring authenticity. Mizrahi has also appeared in and contributed to various documentaries and films, extending ballroom's reach into mainstream media.

== See also ==
- Ballroom culture
- Pose
- Legendary
