= Matthieu Jost =

Matthieu Jost may refer to:

- Matthieu Jost (figure skater)
- Matthieu Jost (entrepreneur)
