= Keiona Revlon =

Ivorian-French drag queen and ballroom dancer

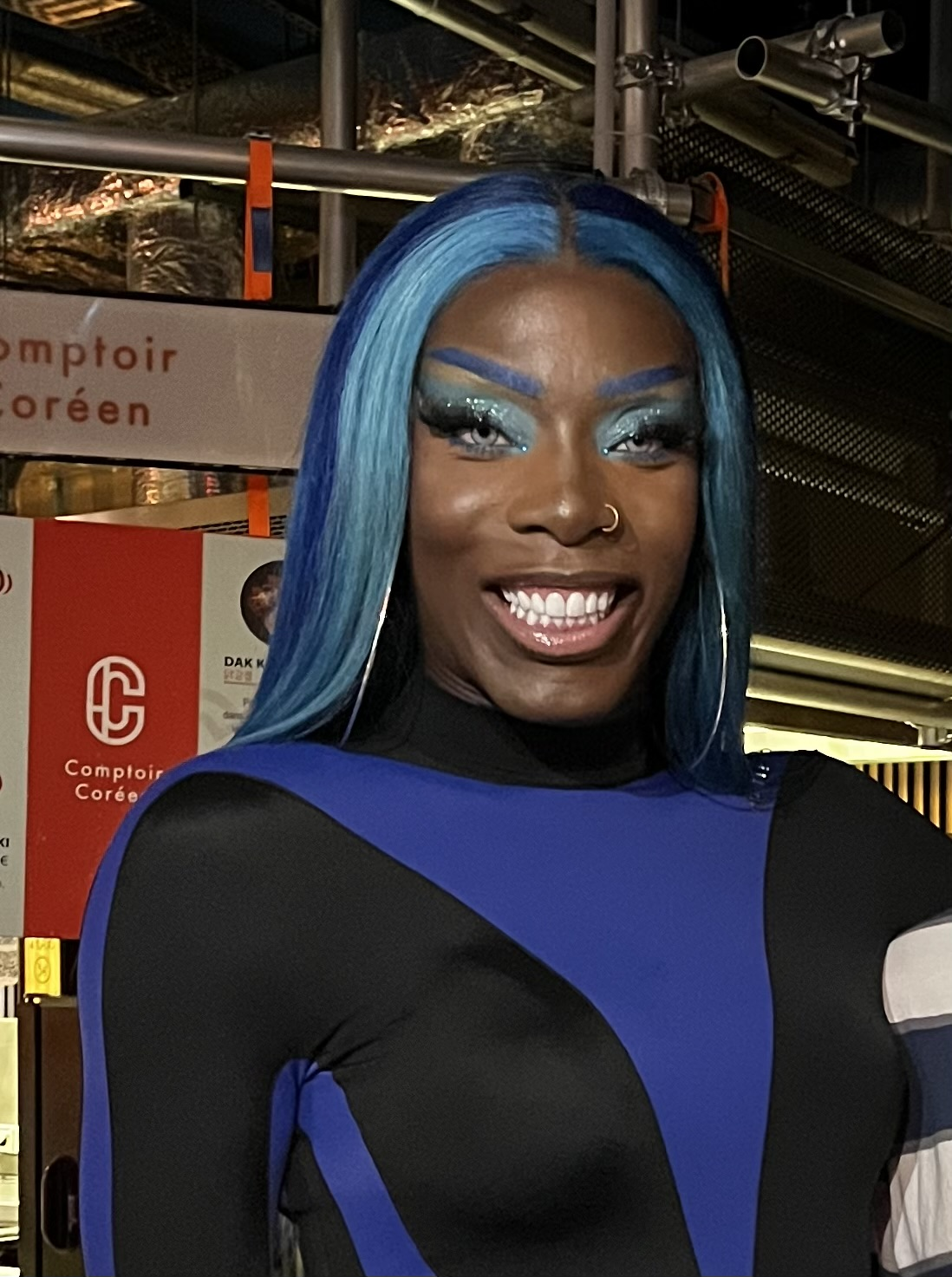
- Keiona in 2023
- Born: Kevin Kouassi; 4 January 1992 (age 34); Paris, Île-de-France, France
- Other names: Keiona; Mother Keiona Revlon
- Citizenship: French
- Occupations: Drag queen; dancer
- Television: Drag Race France (season 2)
- Height: 187 cm (6 ft 1 1/2 in)

Kevin Kouassi, best known by the stage name Keiona Revlon or mononymously as Keiona, is an Ivorian-French drag queen and ballroom performer best known for winning the second season of Drag Race France. Prior to competing on Drag Race, Keiona competed with the House of Revlon Paris on the third season of Legendary.

== Early life ==
=== Origins and family ===
Kevin Kouassi was born on January 4, 1992 in Paris' 20th arrondissement.

She is the eldest of a family of nine children, whose parents are separated. Her Ivorian father is a chartered accountant and has lived in the United States, in Maryland. Her family belongs to the Ivorian upper classes close to power who went into exile following the 2002 coup d’état.

Keiona got married in 2020 to a Brazilian man.

=== Childhood and professional career ===
She spent her adolescence between Draveil, in the Essonne department, and Abidjan, in Ivory Coast.

She successively worked as a sales advisor for Paco Rabanne, Versace, and Prada.

== Career ==
Her beginnings in drag took place within the Ballroom scene, although she had previously begun participating in balls while presenting in a masculine appearance.

She created the character Keiona, initially Keiona Mitchell in 2012. She chose this stage name in reference to the first name of her niece, born two years before she began her drag queen career.

Keiona is the Mother of the French chapter of the House of Revlon, which she leads alongside its Founder and Father, Vinii Revlon. She has organized balls since 2016 on the upper floor of the Gaîté-Lyrique with her collective House of Revlon. In 2018, she danced at the Élysée to celebrate the Fête de la musique. The following year, she took part in the Parisian drag competition Drag Me Up, hosted by Cookie Kunty.

In 2021, she took part in an edition of the program Les Reines du make-up on M6, a spin-off of Les Reines du shopping, which she won.

In 2022, Keiona Revlon came into the spotlight alongside the House of Revlon Paris as contestants on the third season of Legendary. The house faced elimination during the ninth episode, culminating in a third-place finish.

In 2023, she was revealed as one of the contestants on the second season of Drag Race France competing under the mononym Keiona. After a record-breaking trajectory in which she placed in the top for every competitive episode of the season and won two challenges, Keiona won the season and was crowned France's Next Drag Superstar. She won a crown and scepter valued at €40,000 from Y’Paris, a trip for two to New York City (which includes a stay at a five-star hotel, and tickets to a Broadway Show) courtesy of MisterB&B, a one-year supply of MAC Cosmetics, and an appearance on the cover of ELLE France Magazine.

In 2024, she took part in Danse avec les stars with Maxime Dereymez. She reached the semi-finals of the competition, finishing in fourth place.

== Filmography ==
=== Television ===
Year	Title	Role	Notes
2022	Queen	Drag queen	
2022	Legendary (season 3)	Contestant (House of Revlon Paris)	3rd Place
2023	Drag Race France (season 2)	Contestant	Winner
2024	Danse avec les stars (season 13)	Contestant	4th Place
2025	Drag Race Brasil (season 2)	Guest judge	

=== Cinema ===
Year	Title	Role	Notes
2022	Battle: Freestyle	Fabienne	

== Discography ==
=== Singles ===
==== As lead artist ====
- 2025 – Watch Me

==== As featured artist ====
- 2021 – Nobody's Dancing
- 2021 – Bailar
- 2023 – Vegan Girl
- 2023 – We Are Légendaires
- 2023 – Déjà Une Star
- 2023 – Nuit

== See also ==
- List of Ivorians
