= Ariel Goldenberg =

French theatre director (1951–2021)

- Born: 2 February 1951; Buenos Aires, Argentina
- Died: 14 July 2021 (aged 70); Nîmes, France
- Occupation: Theatre director

Ariel Goldenberg (2 February 1951 – 14 July 2021) was an Argentine-born French theatre director.

== Biography ==
Goldenberg moved to France in 1975 and was a judge at the Festival de Nancy, directed by Jack Lang. In 1989, he became head of MC93 Bobigny, where he served until 2000 to take the same position at the Théâtre national de Chaillot. He stayed at Chaillot until his retirement until 2008. In 2000, he became director of the Festival de Otoño a Primavera in Madrid.

Ariel Goldenberg died in Nîmes on 14 July 2021 at the age of 70.
