= Matthieu Jost (entrepreneur) =

French entrepreneur

- Born: Orsay
- Occupation: Entrepreneur
- Known for: Founder - misterb&b & MyGayTrip
- Website: www.brak.com Matthieu Jost

Matthieu Jost is a French entrepreneur and the founder and chief executive officer of the websites misterb&b and MyGayTrip. He has been ranked top 100 most inspirational and influential LGBTQ+ leader in the world by Out Magazine.

Jost founded the French media company Taplanete in 2003. The company published Internet sites for television shows and music and was purchased by AlloCiné in 2004. Later, Jost founded MyGayTrip which has been referred to as a TripAdvisor-type site for the LGBT community. MyGayTrip was a joint venture along with Marc Dedonder and the French magazine Têtu.

Jost founded misterb&b after a trip to Barcelona. He rented a room in a shared apartment and was treated badly by the owner, who was not expecting a gay couple. Feeling uncomfortable, Jost returned to Paris the next day. This experience inspired him to create a platform for people to travel to welcoming environments. Misterb&b started as a combination of MyGayTrip and the short-term apartment rental service Sejourning, and it has since developed into an Airbnb-like platform for the LGBT community.

Misterb&b now has over 300,000 hosts in 135 countries.

Matthieu Jost and misterb&b have been selected to join Expedia Group accelerator program, which aims to help undeserved communities travel more easily across the world.
