= Bonnie Banane =

French musician

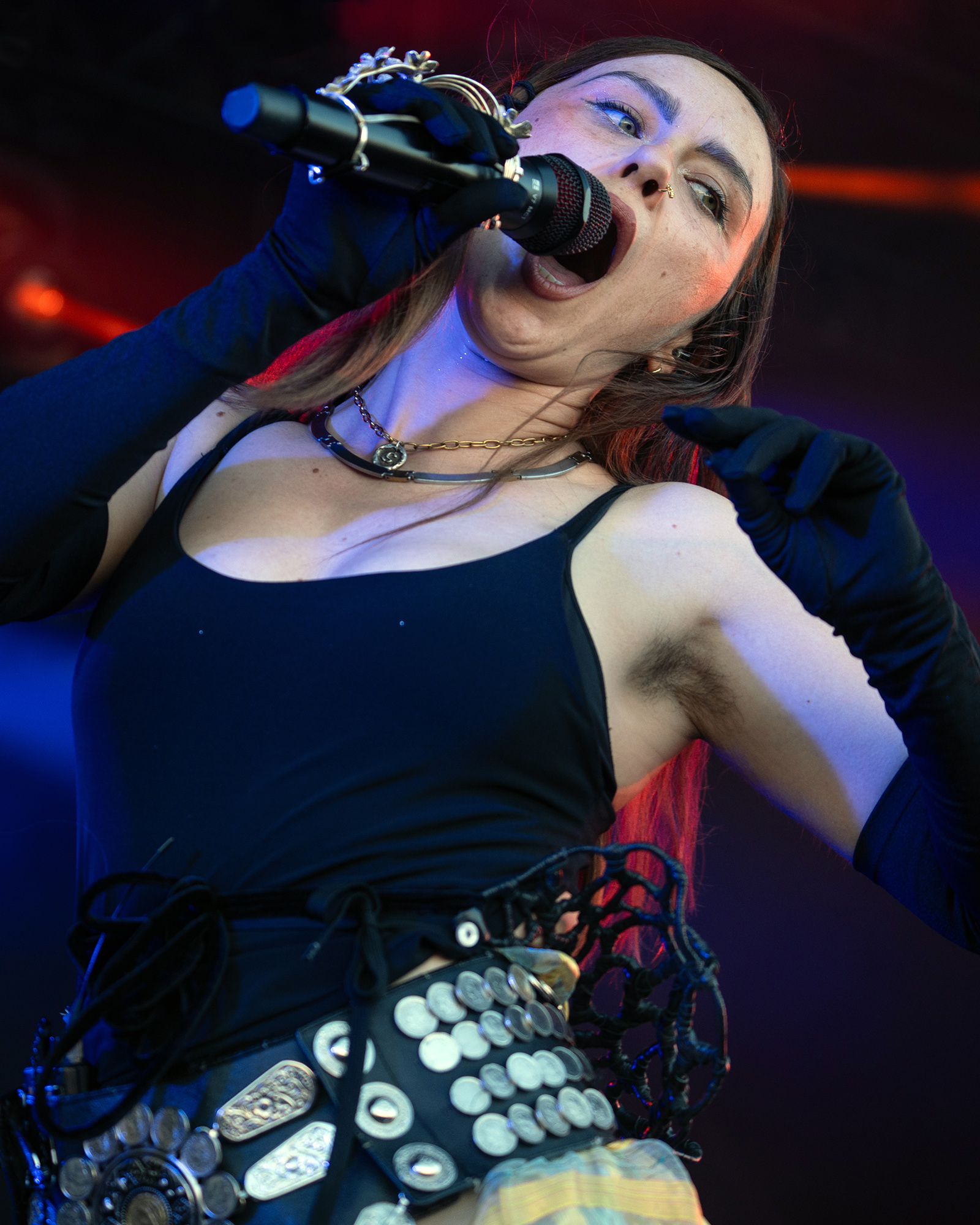

Background information
- Also known as: Bonnie Banane
- Born: 1987 (age 38–39)
- Origin: France
- Genres: experimental pop, alternative R&B
- Occupation: Singer-songwriter
- Instrument: Vocals
- Years active: 2013–present
- Website: Official website

Bonnie Banane (born 1987 as Anaïs Thomas) is a French alternative pop singer based in Paris. Since the release of her first track Muscles in 2012, she has worked alongside producers and artists such as Walter Mecca, Myth Syzer, Gautier Vizioz, Flavien Berger and Varnish La Piscine. She is known for her eccentric music videos, collaborations and appearances on the Colors platform.

== Style and influences ==
Banane blends R&B, soul with snippets of hip-hop and electronics. Her music could be described as experimental pop or alternative R&B.

== Discography ==
=== Albums ===
| Title | Studio album details |
| Sexy Planet | Released: November 23, 2020; Label: Péché Mignon; Formats: LP, CD, digital download |

=== EP ===
- Greatest Hits (2013)
- Rapt (2013)
- Soeur Nature (2015)

=== Singles ===
==== As lead artist ====
- Statue (2016)
- Mouvements (2017)
- Feu au lac (2018)
- La Clef ft. Myth Slazer
- La Lune & Le Soleil (2020)
- Flash (2020)
- Limites (2020)
- Mauvaise Foi (2020)

==== As featured artist ====
- Pollen The Hop ft. Bonnie Banane & Edge
- Le Code Myth Syzer ft. Bonnie Banane, Ichon & Monk
