= MyGayTrip =

myGayTrip
- Website type: Privately held company
- Founded: 2010; 16 years ago Paris, France
- Headquarters: Paris, {{{location_country}}}
- Founders: Matthieu Jost; Marc Dedonder
- Industry: Travel
- Products: Social networking service
- Current status: Offline

myGayTrip was a travel and lifestyle website aimed primarily at gay and lesbian travelers. It was founded in 2010 by French entrepreneurs, Matthieu Jost and Marc Dedonder.

== History ==
myGayTrip was founded as a joint venture between Matthieu Jost, Marc Dedonder, and Têtu, a French magazine for gay men. The site was launched as a response to the relative dearth of gay-friendly travel websites and, in particular, the closure of Attitude Travel in 2011. myGayTrip, Têtu, and Têtu Travels (a subsidiary travel agency under Têtu) worked closely to provide an improved travel experience for those in the LGBT community.

In 2011, the website achieved 50,000 unique visitors per month and 11,000 followers on Facebook. By 2013, those numbers had increased to over 100,000 and 50,000 respectively. The number of destinations and places featured in myGayTrip increased from 15,000 to 20,000 between 2012 and 2013. Also in 2013, myGayTrip entered into a partnership with short-term apartment rental website, Sejourning, to create Misterbnb, a gay-friendly homestay service similar to Airbnb.

By 2012, the website had 80,000 unique visitors each month.

In 2013, it merged to form misterb&b.

== Overview ==
The website was designed as a travel guide similar in style to TripAdvisor.

Users participated in rating and commenting on certain establishments and places, including hotels, bars, restaurants, beaches, and more.

The site also offered city guides and a full social networking experience. The goal was to provide in-depth information about locales that are gay-friendly and/or accepting of the gay community (including a poll that asks users to rank the most gay-friendly cities in the world).

Co-founders Jost and Dedonder attempted to make gay-friendly establishments more accessible and obvious to gay travelers by providing multi-colored logos to participating establishments.

The website also offered news relevant to gay tourism, travel, and other LGBT topics.
