= Misterb&b =

Travel and social networking website

misterb&b
- Type: Private
- Industry: Homestay, Social networking service
- Founded: Paris, France, 2014
- Founder: Matthieu Jost; François de Landes; Marc Dedonder; Julien Delon
- Headquarters: San Francisco, United States
- Parent: Pinklab360
- Website: www.misterbandb.com

misterb&b is a travel and social networking website that provides a searchable database of LGBTQ-friendly rentable lodging, including rooms, apartments, hotels, and homestays, primarily catering to gay men. It is accessible via a website and a mobile app.

It is considered the largest gay-focused booking app in the world. It launched a tool that helps LGBTQ+ users to connect.

misterb&b supports LGBTQ+ NGOs through its initiative "Mister for Good".

== History and formation ==
misterb&b started as a combination of gay travel website myGayTrip and short-term apartment rental service, Sejourning.

Co-founder Matthieu Jost had used services like Airbnb with mixed results. Jost suggested that it was difficult to screen potential hosts to see if they might be gay-friendly. After several uncomfortable experiences, Jost looked into starting a gay-friendly alternative.

The misterb&b website was launched in the spring of 2014.

In 2014, the site was temporarily blocked by Gogo, an in-flight Wifi service.

By 2015, misterb&b had 55,000 hosts in over 130 countries. By 2023 misterb&b partnered with over 200,000 cities worldwide.

The company was selected for and participated in 500 Startups, one of the largest early-stage accelerators in the world.

In May 2015, it was selected by The Next Web as one of the top notable startups from the accelerator. The company also raised $2 million in seed funding at that time.

In June 2017, the company raised a series A round of $8.5 million.

Joel Simkhai, the founder of Grindr, was an early investor.

As of February 2019, the site had over 200,000 properties in 135 countries with total funding of $13.5 million.

As of August 2019, it had over 300,000 hosts in over 135 countries.

It has been selected to join Expedia Group accelerator program to help underserved communities travel more easily across the world.

misterb&b launched Weere to help the LGBTQ community connect with locals and travelers at their destination or from home through shared interests, custom profiles, and real-time moods. Weere is a social hub for building relationships (friends or dates), participating in activities, or gay couch hopping with the global LGBTQ+ community.

== Operation ==
The main function of the website is to match prospective LGBTQ travelers with LGBTQ-friendly hosts worldwide.

The website encourages its hosts to make their apartments or rooms available during major LGBT events in their city. It also acts as a social networking service, travel guide, and online community for gay travelers.

There is no charge for posting an apartment or room for rent on misterb&b, but the site charges in average 10% on room fare from the host and in average 14% of the final bill from the guest.

Users can search using a number of parameters in their desired city. Some of these parameters include: willingness to accept pets, the choice between gay or simply straight allies, and an option for seeking out "unusual" apartments or rooms.

misterb&b reported that 60% of its hosts in Paris do not use other sharing accommodation websites. It also provides curated hotels on the platform and tools to help members stay safe such as misterb&b gift cards.

There has been a misconception that the service promotes a hookup culture.

Misterb&b encourages forming friendships between hosts and guests.

It offers a loyalty program. It also has safety features such as identity verification.

== Recognition ==
- Matthieu Jost, the CEO has been ranked top 100 most inspirational and influential LGBTQ+ leader in the world by Out Magazine.
- misterb&b app has been selected twice by Apple as App of the day
- Misterb&b won The One Show three times.
- misterb&b sponsored Drag Race France Season 2 and Season 3

== See also ==
- Homosocialization
