= Law Roach =

American fashion stylist (born 1978)

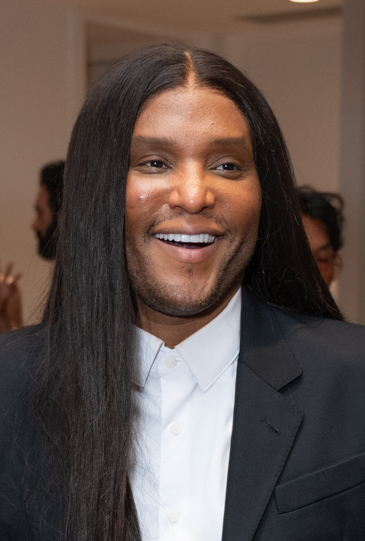
- Roach in 2024
- Born: July 20, 1978 (age 48); Chicago, Illinois, U.S.
- Education: Chicago State University (attended)
- Years active: 2009–present

Lawrence "Law" Roach (born July 20, 1978) is an American fashion stylist, self proclaimed “image architect,” and television personality best known for his work with artists such as Zendaya, Céline Dion, and Ariana Grande. Roach served as a primary judge on the HBO Max competition series Legendary (2020–2022). He announced his retirement from styling in 2023, dedicating himself to his creative relationship with Zendaya. He returned to styling in April 2025. Roach is also one of the main judges on RuPaul's Drag Race and Project Runway, starting on season 17 and season 21, respectively.

== Career ==
Law Roach grew up in Chicago, where he studied psychology at Chicago State University and started a clothing boutique, Deliciously Vintage, in Pilsen. He then moved to Los Angeles, where Zendaya became his first major client as a stylist.

For the 2021 Met Gala, Roach had the opportunity to style 10 celebrities, including Alton Mason, Kehlani, and Hunter Schafer.

He starred as a permanent judge on the HBO Max show Legendary with Megan Thee Stallion, Keke Palmer, Leiomy Maldonado, and Jameela Jamil.

As a stylist, some of his well-known clients are Celine Dion, Zendaya, Tom Holland, Kerry Washington, Anya Taylor-Joy, Ariana Grande, and Megan Thee Stallion. In 2016, Roach was announced as one of the judges for cycle 23 of America's Next Top Model, with Ashley Graham, Rita Ora and Drew Elliott. The following year, he partnered with Celine Dion to style her for Couture Week in Paris, and he became the first African-American stylist to cover the annual The Hollywood Reporter's issue of Stylist & Stars. Dion and Zendaya joined Roach for the cover.

He received the 2021 Gem Award for Jewelry Style. He received the inaugural stylist award for American Fashion at the 2022 CFDA Awards in New York.

Roach announced his retirement from styling via Instagram in March 14, 2023, stating that "if this business was just about clothes I would do it for the rest of my life but unfortunately it's not! The politics, the lies and false narratives finally got me! You win...I'm out." However, Roach later clarified that he still was working with Zendaya by stating "So y'all really think I'm breaking up with Z...we are forever!" and "She's my little sister and it's real love not the fake industry love." Roach later stated it was best for him to "walk away from the industry for a while" to focus on his mental and physical health.

In his March 17, 2023, interview with The Cut, Roach cited burnout and a desire to live a happier life as reasons for his retirement. Roach discussed the challenges he faces in the industry, including "false narratives perpetuated by gatekeepers and intermediaries". He expressed frustration at the loss of clients due to these narratives, which "are often untrue". Roach noted his love for fashion and his commitment to protecting his clients, but expressed a desire to be better taken care of in return. He also mentioned that he "got overwhelmed and never got a chance to properly grieve" the death of his nephew.

During Roach's hiatus from styling, he continued working with Zendaya exclusively. In April 2025, Roach announced his return to styling with "his new muse" Ryan Destiny. In January 2026 Roach began styling for Lauren Sánchez Bezos.

On May 14, 2026, Roach announced he would be in charge of styling for Ariana Grande's 2026 Eternal Sunshine Tour: "I am the costume designer for Ariana Grande’s tour. The new tour. I actually leave here very early in the morning to go back to L.A. to start fittings for that".

== Personal life ==
In 2023, Roach came out as aromantic.

Through a series of Instagram stories in 2021, Roach revealed the death of his three-year-old nephew. According to the Chicago Police Department Office of Communications, Roach's nephew died on November 23, 2021, after falling out of a window on the 17th story of a Chicago building with the screen drawn inward.

== Filmography ==
=== Film ===
Year	Title	Notes
2021	Malcolm & Marie	Costume Designer
2021	If I Can't Have Love, I Want Power	Costume Designer
2026	The Devil Wears Prada 2	Cameo as himself

=== Television ===
Year	Title	Role	Notes
2016–2018	America's Next Top Model	Main judge	Season 23–24 (30 episodes)
2018	Red Carpet Icons	Himself	Season 1
2020–2022	Legendary	Main judge	Season 1–3 (29 episodes)
2022–2023	The Drew Barrymore Show	Himself	Guest (Season 3, 2 episodes)
2024–present	RuPaul's Drag Race	Himself	Season 17–present; guest judge (Season 16, episode 6)
2024–present	RuPaul's Drag Race: Untucked!	Himself	Season 16–present; guest (Season 15, episode 6)
2025–present	Project Runway	Himself	Season 21–present; guest judge (Season 20, episode 13)
2025–2026	Running Point	Guest (2 episodes)	
2025–present	RuPaul's Drag Race All Stars	Main judge	Season 10–present
2025–present	RuPaul's Drag Race All Stars: Untucked!	Himself	Season 7–present

== Accolades ==
Award	Year	Category	Nominated work	Result
Queerties Awards	2025	Read	How to Build a Fashion Icon	Nominated
CFDA Fashion Awards	2022	Stylist award	Himself	Won
MTV Movie & TV Awards	2021	Best Fight	Legendary (Note: Shared with Dominique Jackson)	Nominated
InStyle Awards	2019	Stylist of the Year	Himself	Won
