= Cent Quatre =

Cultural center in Paris, France

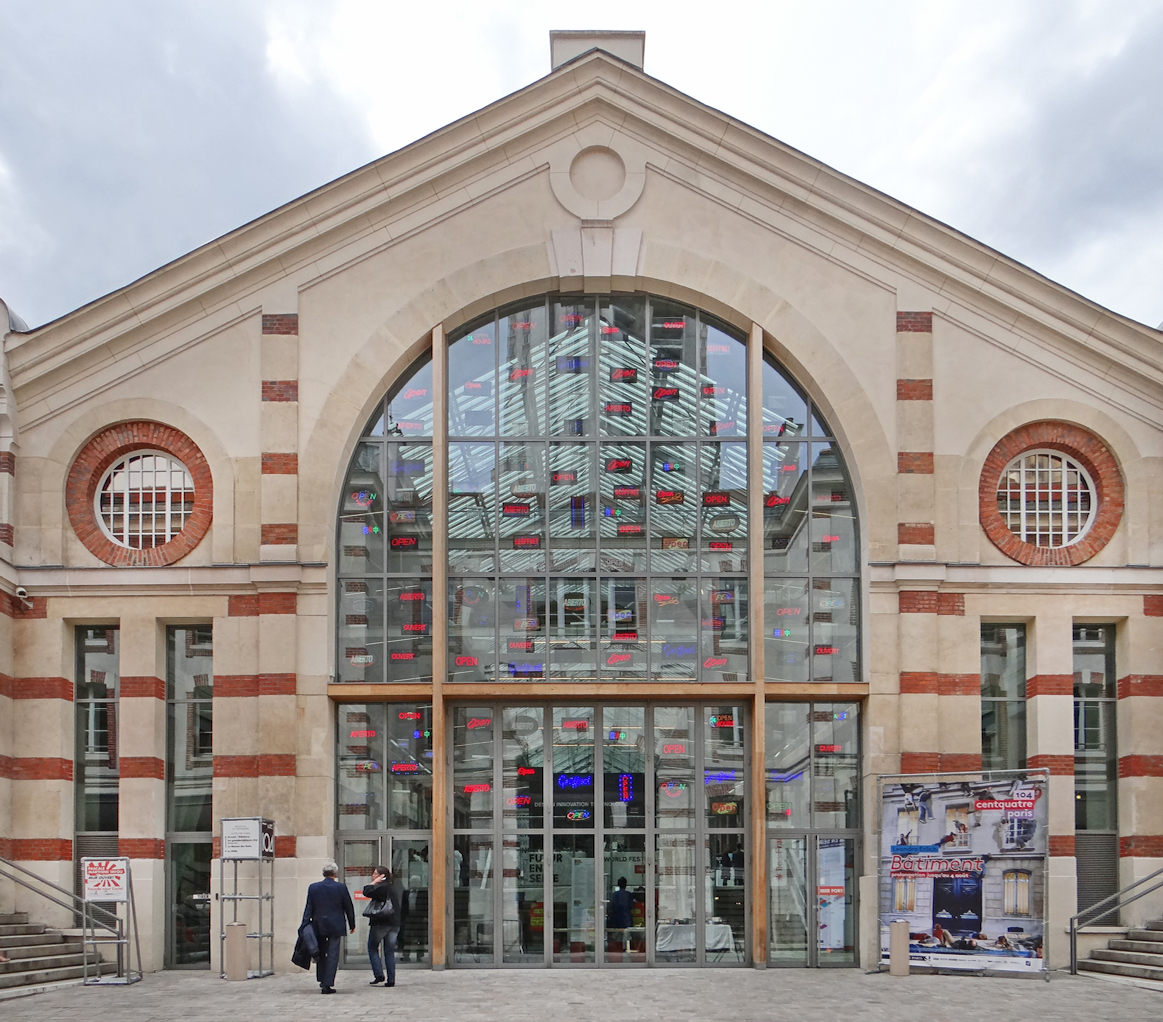
- Established: October 2008
- Location: Paris, France
- Coordinates: 48.89016667°N 2.369891667°E
- Collections: Modern art Sculpture Painting Graphic art Photography New media Film Architecture Design
- Director: José-Manuel Gonçalvès
- Website: www.104.fr

The Cent Quatre (pronounced [sɑ̃ katʁ], meaning "104") is a public cultural centre in Paris, which opened on 11 October 2008 on the site of a former municipal undertaker's at 104 rue d'Aubervilliers, in the 19th arrondissement of the city.

== History of the building ==
In 1870, the Archbishop of Paris, responsible for city burials, established a funeral service on a site known as les Petits Noyers. He ordered the construction of a new building on the site, covering an area of 26,000 m^{2} (280,000 sq ft), alongside the railtracks leading to the Gare de l'Est, between the rue des Vertus (now the rue d'Aubervilliers) and the rue Curial.

In 1874, after two years of work, the building was inaugurated. It was the work of the architects Édouard Delebarre de Bay and Godon, under the supervision of Victor Baltard, chief architect of Paris. The building was conceived in the style of the industrial architecture of the time (that of large train stations and exhibition halls), and constructed around a cast-iron frame using glass and brick. The surface area of the building was the same as the Place de la République. It consisted of two large canopied halls, loading bays, areas, stables and cellars, and was over 270 m (890 ft) long.

For over 120 years, the building housed the city undertakers for Paris. Over 1,000 people worked in the building, organising 150 funeral processions per day. The main hall on the rue d'Aubervilliers was used for the preparation of coffins and catafalques. The second, on the rue de Curial housed 80 hearses and around 100 funeral chariots on the ground floor and 300 horses in 28 stables in the basement, where over 6,000 coffins were also stored, along with horse-feed and a 50,000-litre water tank. The halls also contained a group of twelve shops offering funeral ornaments as well as workshops for carpentry, tapestry, painting and upholstery.

In 1905, following the separation of church and state in France, funeral services were taken on by the municipality. During the 20th century, the building reached the height of its activity, with 1,400 people working there (almost all men, with only around 40 women).

After World War II, funeral services became motorised and the hall on the rue Curial became a garage for 150 vans and 92 saloon cars, along with their workshops and mechanics. The building had no mortuary, and did not house bodies except during World War II, the First Indochina War and the Algerian War, when it received the repatriated bodies of soldiers. In May 1968, the undertakers did not strike, but self-managed for a month.

The public sector monopoly over funeral services ended in 1993, and activity at the site declined to such an extent that it was closed in 1998. The building has been registered as a historic monument since 21 January 1997. The Mayor of Paris placed the building within an urban renewal project in order to protect and restore it.

== Arts centre ==
In 2003 the city administration awarded the contract for the redevelopment of the site to the Paris-based architects Atelier Novembre, following a tendering process. Their proposal was judged as best respecting the character of the site. The Cent Quatre was inaugurated on 11 October 2008.

Two screening rooms with 200 and 400 seats respectively are situated at the centre of the building. The former stables in the basement have been renovated as event and exhibition space.

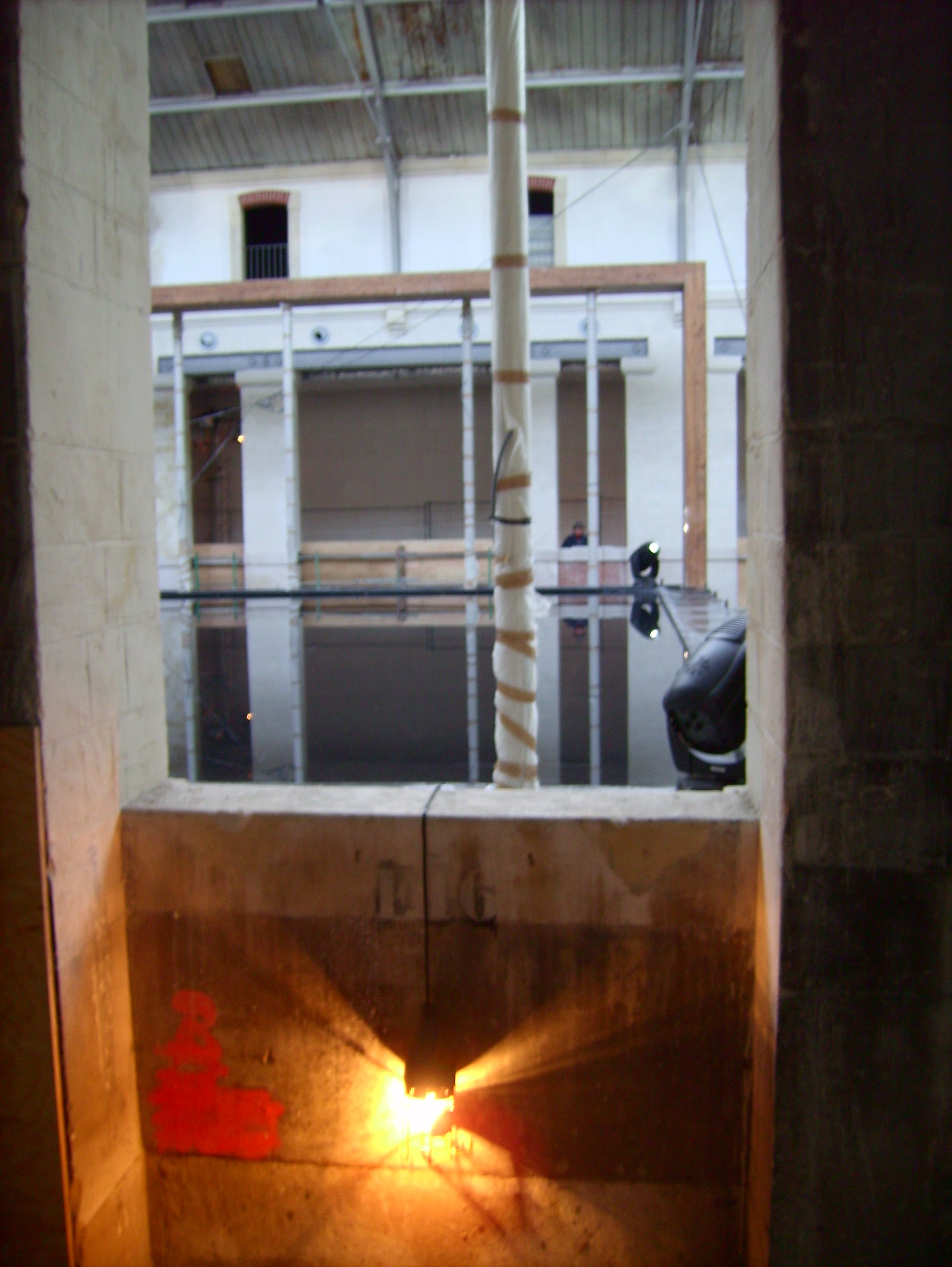
Photo taken at an open day during construction, 2007.

The Cent Quatre extends over an area of 15,848 m^{2} and the total surface area of its floors is 36,800 m^{2}, of which 25,000 m^{2} is usable exhibition space. The building is designed to accommodate 5,000 visitors at any one time. It has 200 artists in residence. 100% of the €110 million refurbishment costs were funded by the city, which also funds 75% of the building's €12 million annual running-costs.

The Cent Quatre is by law a "public institution for cultural cooperation", meaning it is managed at arm's length by local government. It has the official name "104 CENT QUATRE". Two directors, Robert Cantarella and Frédéric Fisbach, were nominated in 2005 by the mayor of Paris, Bertrand Delanoë. Their term ended in the spring of 2010, when a new director was publicly recruited. On 9 June 2010, José Manuel Gonçalves was named as the new director.

=== Activities ===
Artists of all disciplines are invited to work in studios on site, allowing the public to view their work in production. The Cent Quatre regularly presents contemporary art exhibitions and has become one of the meeting places of the parisian youth for urban dances and other artistic or audiovisual activities. It also operates as a business incubator for social and cultural enterprises which it seeks to integrate with the artistic life of the building. The building is situated close to relatively deprived areas of Paris and runs community engagement activities and work experience programmes.

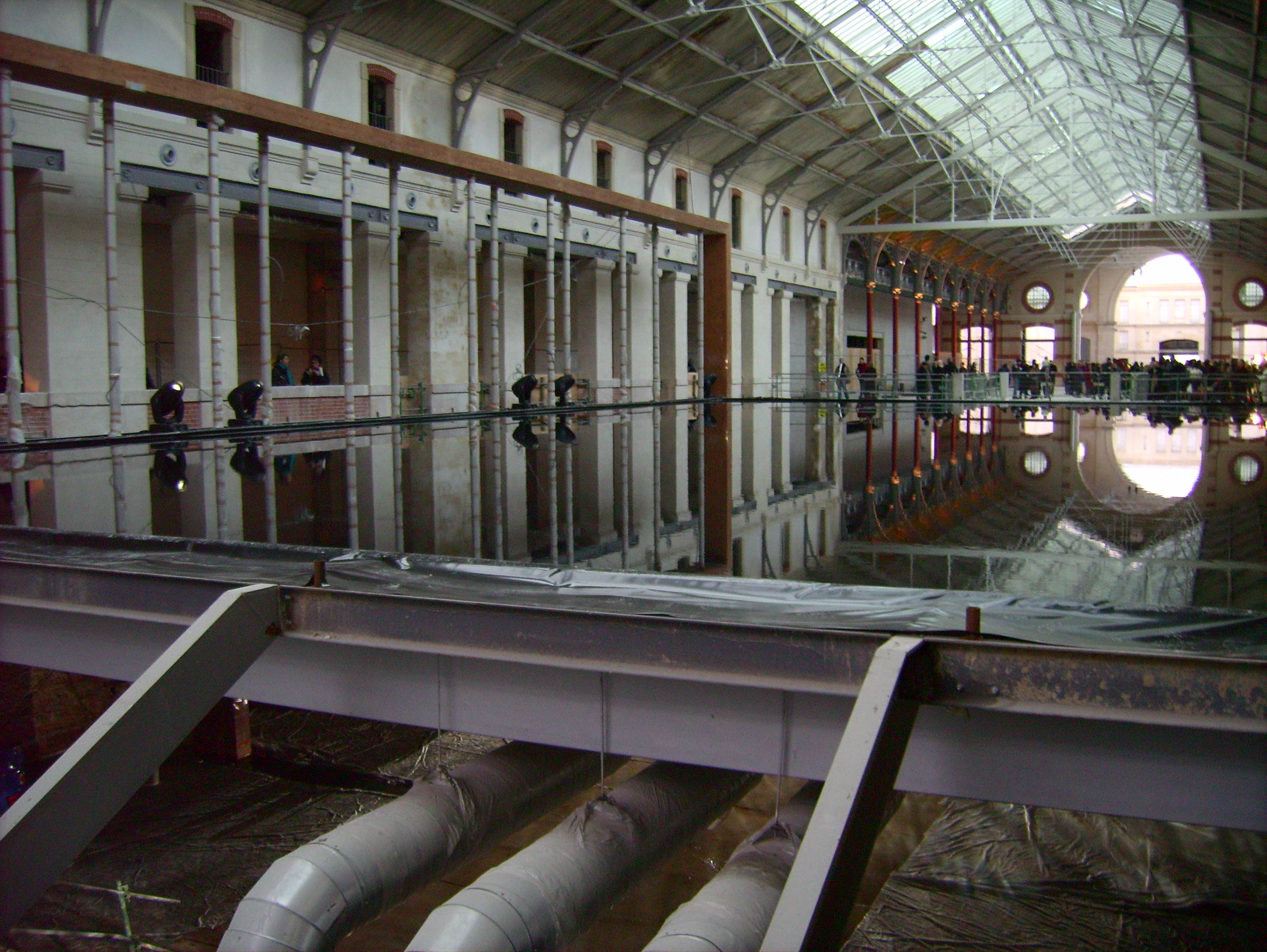
Photo taken at an open day during construction, 2007.

The Cent Quatre is part of a European network of similar projects. These include: RadialSystem V, a music and dance centre based in a former electricity sub-station in Berlin; Zone Attive, an arts centre opened in a former abattoir in Rome in 2008; Matadero Madrid, an arts centre also based in a former abattoir.
