= Régine Chopinot =

French dancer and choreographer

- Born: 1952 (age 72–73); Fort-de-l'Eau, Algeria
- Occupation(s): Choreographer, dancer
- Years active: 1976–present
- Website: cornucopiae.net

Régine Chopinot (born 1952), born at Fort-de-l'Eau (nowadays Bordj El Kiffan) in Algeria, is a French dancer and choreographer of Contemporary Dance.

== History ==
Since she was 5 years old, Régine Chopinot studied classical dance, and then discovered, in 1974, Contemporary Dance with Marie Zighera. She will later teach at Croix-Rousse in Lyon (Véronique Ros de la Grange was one of her students). In 1978, she founded her own company, Compagnie du Grèbe, in association with dancers, actors and musicians. She then signed her first choreographies. In 1981, three years later, she won the second prize of Concours chorégraphique international de Bagnolet for Halley's Comet.

Her creations, Délices et Via, will introduce multimedia and cinema in the dance world and use new lighting techniques. For Délices in 1983, Régine Chopinot met Jean-Paul Gaultier, a French tailor. Both artists will keep working together for 10 years, for Le Défilé (1985), K.O.K. (1988), Ana (1990), St Georges (1991) and Façade (1993).
