= MC93 Bobigny =

- Interactive map of MC93 Bobigny
- Address: 9, Boulevard Lénine; Bobigny
- Coordinates: 48.9066°N 2.439512°E
- Operator: Ministère de la Culture
- Type: Performance venue
- Capacity: Salle Oleg Efremov: 866 seats Nouvelle Salle: 220 seats Salle Christian Bourgois: 128 seats
- Current use: Theatre; Contemporary dance Music; Classical music

Construction
- Opened: February 19, 1980; 45 years ago

Website
- www.mc93.com

The Culture House of Seine-Saint-Denis in Bobigny, more commonly known as MC93 Bobigny, is an important performance venue in the Paris region. Its main activity is focused on the creation and presentation of French and international theatre performances, as well as dance, opera, and music.

== History ==
MC93 is a venue for creating and producing live performances that was envisioned in the late 1960s in Bobigny, Seine-Saint-Denis, as part of the decentralization movement promoted by the then Ministry of Culture, André Malraux. After evaluation and execution of the project, MC93 finally opened its doors on February 19, 1980. The main hall, Oleg Efremov, can accommodate 866 spectators, the smaller hall, Christian Bourgois, can seat 220 people, and there is also a rehearsal room with a capacity of 128 seats.

The primary activity of the institution is focused on theatrical productions, notably by Robert Wilson, Peter Sellars, Deborah Warner, and Lev Dodin, as well as promoting in France the stage directions of Jean-Michel Rabeux, Nicolas Bigards, Patrick Pineau, Jean-Yves Ruf, Georges Lavaudant, and Jean-René Lemoine. Since the end of the International Choreographic Competition in Bagnolet in 1988, MC93 has also hosted many contemporary dance performances during the International Choreographic Encounters of Seine-Saint-Denis that followed. MC93 also collaborates with other festivals in the department such as "Banlieues bleues" for jazz and "Africolor" for world music.

In 1990 and again in 1999, the building was expanded to allow MC93 to expand its programming.

In 2004, the International Theater Festival called "Standard Idéal" was created. Since 2007, MC93 has also developed a partnership with the Atelier lyrique of the Paris Opera for performances that train young singers.

In early October 2008, a project to install the troupe of the Comédie-Française at MC93 was announced. This decision, made jointly by the Ministry of Culture, local authorities, and the general administrator of the Comédie-Française Muriel Mayette without consulting Patrick Sommier, the director of Bobigny, aimed to develop additional and contemporary programs within this suburban institution. The project faced strong opposition from Bobigny's leaders, as well as the company of the Comédie-Française, which declared solidarity with MC93. This was supported by prominent figures in the profession such as Patrice Chéreau, Michel Piccoli, Anne Alvaro, and Jean-Pierre Dardenne.

From 2015 to 2017, MC93 was completely closed for deep renovation and restructuring work. The building was made asbestos-free, lead-free, and brought up to the latest standards (accessibility for people with reduced mobility, electricity, energy consumption, and emergency evacuation). The reception hall was enlarged (from 300 m² to 700 m²), remodeled, and provides direct access to a wide promenade opening onto the city. The soundproofing was completely redesigned to account for the proximity of the tramway line that did not exist when MC93 was built. The scenic arrangements were improved, with a new additional room, tiered seating, and entirely modular rooms. Internal circulation was completely rationalized and optimized.

The renovated MC93 was pre-inaugurated on May 23, 2017.

=== Directors ===
- Claude-Olivier Stern from 1972 to 1984
- Joël Chosson from 1984 to 1985
- René Gonzalez from 1985 to 1989
- Ariel Goldenberg from 1989 to 2000
- Patrick Sommier from 2000 to 2015
- Hortense Archambault since 2015

== Access ==
MC93 is located at 9, Boulevard Lénine in Bobigny. It is accessible by the Bobigny–Pablo Picasso station on Paris Métro Line 5 and by the Hôtel de Ville de Bobigny station on Île-de-France tramway Line 1.
