= Leiomy Maldonado =

Puerto Rican dancer and activist

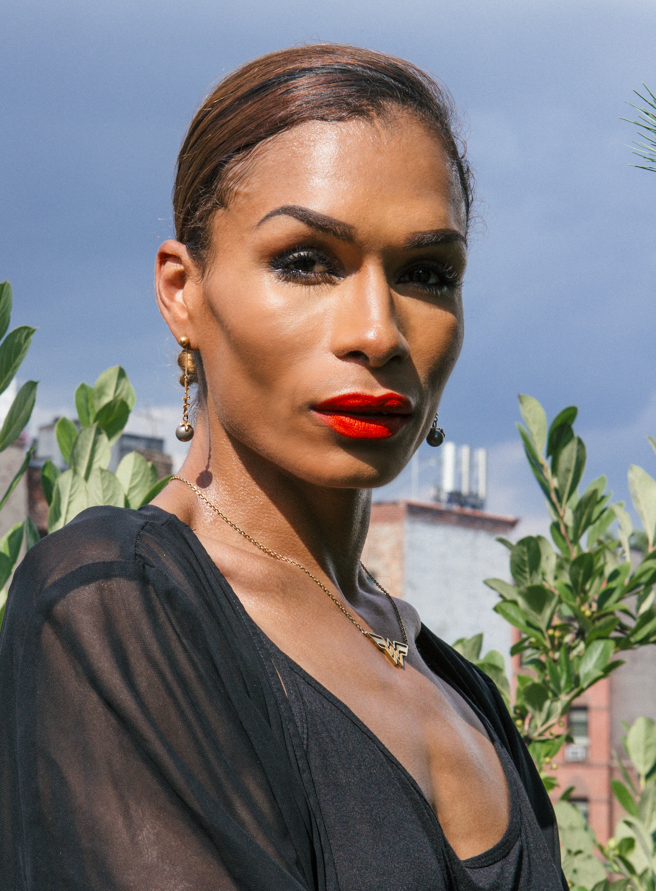
- Maldonado in 2016
- Born: April 28, 1987 (age 39); New York City, U.S.
- Other names: "Wonder Woman of Vogue"; "Amazon Mother"; "Amazon Leiomy"
- Occupations: Dancer; choreographer
- Years active: 2002–present

Leiomy Maldonado (born April 28, 1987), known as the "Wonder Woman of Vogue", is a transgender Puerto Rican-American dancer, instructor, model, activist, and ballroom dancer. She is the founder of the House of Amazon and is credited with developing a more athletic and dramatic style of voguing in early 2000s New York, including her signature hair flip move, "The Leiomy Lolly".

In 2009, Maldonado became the first openly transgender woman to appear on MTV's America's Best Dance Crew, competing as a member of Vogue Evolution during Season 4. She choreographed the ballroom scenes in the FX series Pose (2018–19) and was a judge on the HBO Max competition series Legendary (2020–22). In 2026, she made her Broadway debut as Macavity in CATS: The Jellicle Ball.

== Early life ==
Leiomy Maldonado was born on April 28, 1987, in the Bronx. Maldonado was first introduced to voguing at the age of 15 at the Kips Bay Boys & Girls Club in the Bronx. She has said that a mentor there introduced her by giving her a VHS tape:

I went home and I put that tape in and I was immediately intrigued by everything about voguing, everything I saw; the energy, the battling, and just the different personalities that you see through every girl that was on the VHS tape.

A year later at 16, she was introduced to the ballroom scene and became an active member of the community in New York. Ballroom is an underground subculture created by mostly impoverished Black and Latino LGBT youth, where they could safely express themselves through dance battles and pageantry. Maldonado cites Ballroom icons Yolanda Jourdan and Alloura Jourdan Zion as her main influences behind her vogue.

== Career ==
=== Television ===
She is the first-ever openly transgender woman to appear on MTV's America's Best Dance Crew Season 4 in 2009, where her crew made it to the top five. After appearing on TV, Maldonado's signature hair flip move, "The Leiomy Lolly", was adopted by musicians and celebrities, such as Janet Jackson, Beyoncé, Lady Gaga, and Britney Spears. While the moves she has created have become known worldwide, credit has not always been given to her as the originator.

Maldonado was the choreographer for the ballroom scenes in Pose and appeared in the show as the character Florida Ferocity.

Maldonado was one of the judges on the HBO Max show Legendary, a dance competition inspired by the world of ballroom. Ten houses competed against each other in weekly vogue battles, with a different theme for each episode. Maldonado appeared as a judge alongside actor Jameela Jamil, celebrity stylist Law Roach, and rapper Megan Thee Stallion. On joining the show, Maldonado stated, "I think they will learn how important ballroom culture is for us, for our community. They'll also experience how much hard work it takes for us to prepare for these balls and how important it is for us to be celebrated and have a platform to showcase our talent."

She appeared in the second episode of the docuseries My House and is the "mother" of Tati 007.

=== Music videos ===
Maldonado appeared in Willow Smith's "Whip My Hair" music video, doing her signature move. She went on to appear in other music videos, such as Icona Pop's "All Night" music video, which paid tribute to the 1991 documentary Paris is Burning, and the video of Russian pop singer Philipp Kirkorov "Цвет настроения синий" (Mood colour is blue).

=== Modeling ===
Maldonado was the star of the Nike "#BeTrue" advertisement, in support of Pride Month 2017; she is only the second transgender athlete to be featured in a Nike video advertisement. She also starred in Black Opal's beauty campaign as their first trans model.

Maldonado has also walked the runway in New York Fashion Week and in the Savage X Fenty Show in September 2021, a TV special about the fashion show of Rihanna's lingerie clothing line Savage X Fenty.

=== Stage ===
Maldonado made her Broadway debut as Macavity in CATS: The Jellicle Ball, the 2026 revival of Cats.

== Filmography ==
=== Television ===
Year	Title	Role	Notes
2009	America's Best Dance Crew	Herself	Season 4: Member of Vogue Evolution, 5th place (5 episodes)
2018	My House	Herself	Guest (1 episode)
2018–2019	Pose	Florida Ferocity	Recurring role (7 episodes); also Choreographer for show
2020–2022	Legendary	Herself	Judge

== See also ==
- LGBT culture in New York City
- List of LGBT people from New York City
- NYC Pride March
