= Amandine Gay =

French feminist, filmmaker, researcher and actress

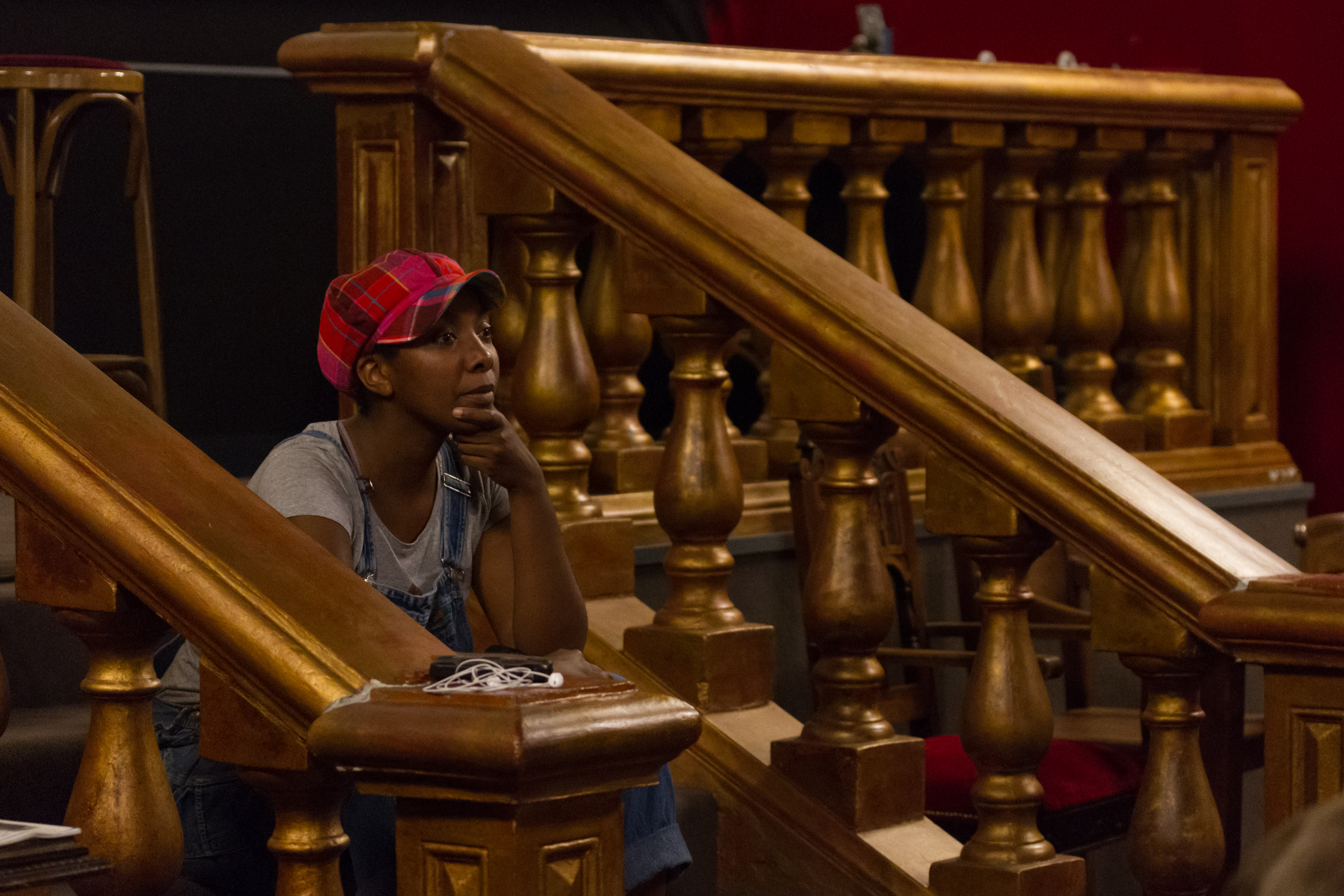
- Amandine Gay at a projection of Ouvrir la Voix in 2017
- Born: February 16, 1984
- Occupation: Filmmaker · Feminist · Actress

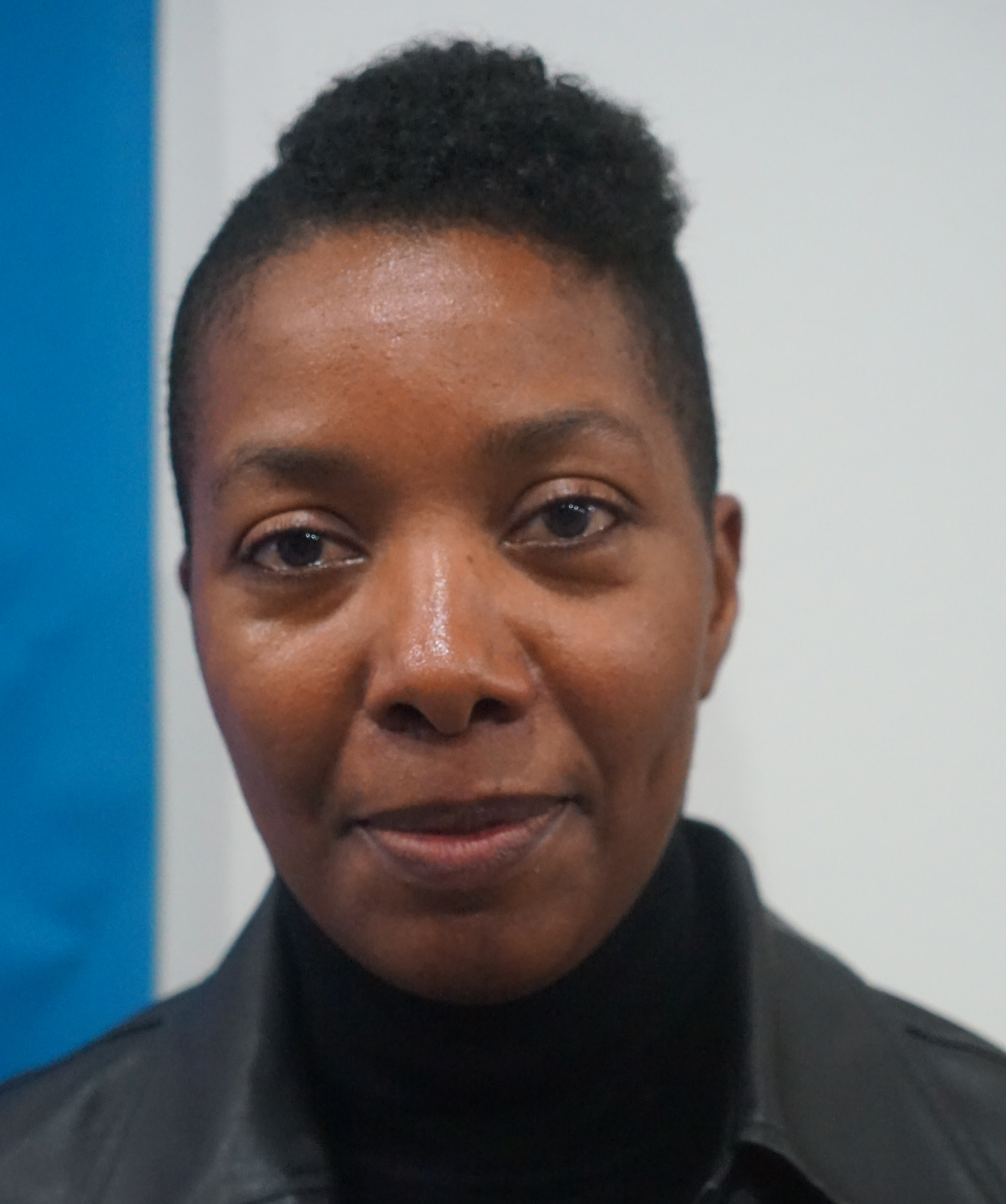
Amandine Gay, HEAD Cinema Festival 2025

Amandine Gay (French pronunciation: [amɑ̃din ɡɛ]; born October 16, 1984) is a French feminist, filmmaker, researcher and actress. Her first film Ouvrir la Voix is a documentary giving voice to Black women in France that aims to give an other approach of feminist movements.

== Biography ==
Amandine Gay is born of a Moroccan mother and an unknown father on October 16, 1984, in France. Her mother and her adoptive father, both white, are respectively a school teacher and a roadmender living in a village near Lyon. She plays basketball at a good level. She graduated from the Institut d'études politiques de Lyon in Communications, and then from the Conservatoire d'Art dramatique of the 16^{e} arrondissement de Paris, that she joins in 2008:

My entire education, I did it in white environments, surrounded by racist people. I tried to make efforts but I was only just a black person for them. I've been pissed at a very young age. However, I would say that activism came with a certain political awareness. When in 2005, deputies UMP tried to pass a law, Law on the recognition of the Nation and national contribution in favor of French repatriates (loi sur le rôle positif de la colonisation), I was so shocked I decided to work on « the stakes and approach of the colonial question » as my research subject during my last year as a student in Lyon's political science school.5.

After her studies she starts working as an actress, but after a few months of activity, she realizes that she is always interpreting the same stereotypical roles (drug addict, prostitute, illegal immigrant). Her agent tells her that although he is sending her profile for roles corresponding to her age, she receives answers only when the scenario is specifying that the role is for a Black character.

In five years of work, I obtained only two "normal" roles, a lawyer on a TF1 series and a theater role, in which I played several different characters. After 5 years, I had enough: I ceased my career to become a film maker."

From this experience stems her will to become a filmmaker to promote another vision of Black women and also to be able to play the roles that she appreciates. She starts to write short programs for television, though she finds it difficult to find funding. Amandine Gay explains that film producers are usually white men in their fifties. They don't recognize their societal experiences in the programs that she develops. She co-writes a fiction, a satire of feminine magazines called Medias Tartes. One of the characters is a Black lesbian wine steward meets the misunderstanding of potential investors, who tell her that such a person does not exist in France, then this character is inspired from her own life.

For these reasons, Amandine Gay starts working on her own documentary film Ouvrir la Voix, thanks to a crowdfunding campaign, without the support of the Centre national du cinéma et de l'image animée (CNC). In this film which was issued in 2016, Amandine Gay réunites 24 women of African origins, citizens, activists, engineers, researchers or bloggers to talk about their identity of Black women in France. The film received the Out d'or for artistic creation in 2017.

Since 2014, as she did not see herself founding a family "nothing that could make a black child proud", she lives in Montreal to continue her research and produce films concerning issues of minorities, specifically linked to racism, echoing her own experiences "adoption by white families of racialised children"

She was for a time an activist within Osez le féminisme !, then declaring:

Mais je n'aime pas l'idée d'une ligne de parti. Je ne me vois pas comme une militante, plutôt comme une auteure politique13

And again:

Je ne me suis pas retrouvée dans leur féminisme. J’étais la caution noire dans une association de bourgeoises majoritairement blanches.

She defines herself as of African descent, Black, born, afro-feminist, pansexual, antiracist, anti heteronormativity, afro-punk, pro-choice (abortion, veil, sex working), body-positive. She is an associated expert of the Berlin-based NGO Center for Intersectional Justice.

== Publications ==
Amandine Gay published two major autobiographical essays. Her latest book, Vivre, libre. Exister au cœur de la suprématie blanche (2025), examines the structures of white supremacy and the prospects for emancipation in a society shaped by racial oppression. Gay explores questions of resistance to systemic racism, framing white supremacy as a political regime rather than a purely individual or moral issue. She analyzes everyday experiences—adult supremacy, family, friendship, sexuality, and work—and considers how white supremacy perpetuates itself. Gay, as a keen observer of power relations, identifies "ordinary forms of racial violence" and proposes methods for emancipation through active antiracism.

Drawing on the philosopher Charles W. Mills, Gay discusses "white ignorance", a concept describing cognitive mechanisms among whites that render racial dominance invisible to them. According to Mills, whose theories trace back to Enlightenment thinkers, the origin lies in the seventeenth century "social contract," which in effect excluded large groups—non-Europeans—from full humanity. Mills qualifies the social contract as a racial contract, foundational yet tacit and widely unacknowledged.

Gay's first autobiographical work, Une poupée en chocolat (2021), addresses questions of adoption, loss, and identity. She recalls, "I am a person born under X, possessing nothing from my past: no medical history, no genealogy, no family memory. I must write my story so as not to remain a sum of silences, traumas, and dispossessions. This book is a trace, an archive, a piece of the puzzle I try to complete through political analysis."

Describing her motives in an interview, Gay stated: "In 2021, I decided to tell my story in an autobiographical essay on adoption... showing how adoption is a political issue. Growing up, there were very few adopted people in public life and prevailing discourses focused mostly on psychology and humanitarian or moral questions—rarely on topics such as racism, acculturation, or anonymity of birth mothers. For me, it was necessary to link these topics, making visible that adoption in itself often responds to the desires of adults in wealthy countries."

== Publications ==
- Vivre, libre. Exister au cœur de la suprématie blanche (La Découverte, 2025)
- Une poupée en chocolat (La Découverte, 2021)

=== Additional publications ===
- Nouveau départ (2023), a text titled Ceci n’est pas une postface.
- Preface: Lâche le micro ! 150 ans de luttes des femmes noires pour le droit à l'auto-détermination, in the French translation of bell hooks, Ne suis-je pas une femme ? Femmes noires et féminisme (2015). This preface introduces bell hooks's foundational work on Black feminism to a French audience.
- Chapter Je n’en ferai pas in Nullipares et alors ? (2025). Contributed a chapter titled Je n’en ferai pas (pp. 147–163) in this collective work discussing childlessness and societal expectations.
- Contribution to Venir au monde – autonomie, dignité et luttes pour une justice reproductive (2025). Contribution to this collective volume focused on autonomy, dignity, and reproductive justice.
- Essay Emulation or competition? in Wages for wages against – volume 3 (2024) (pp. 68–77) exploring precarity and selection processes in artistic fields.
- Essay Les blanc·he·s et les noir·e·s ont bien une place distincte dans la hiérarchie sociale en France, in Écrits féministes. II. de 1970 à nos jours (2023)(pp. 133–139), discussing racial hierarchies in French society.
- Contribution in La poudre – féminismes et cinéma. Le grand tournant raconté par les voix engagées du cinéma français. Tome 2 (2021) (pp. 47–70), reflecting on feminism and cinema.
- Essay What’s in a word? in Reach everyone on the planet: Kimberlé Crenshaw and intersectionality (2019) (pp. 63–66) about intersectionality theory.
- Essay La crise d’une utopie blanche ? in Éloge des mauvaises herbes (2018)(pp. 157–165), analyzing white utopia and social movements.
- Essay La réappropriation des moyens de production au service d’une esthétique autonome, in Décolonisons les arts ! (2018)(pp. 46–53).
- Essay Who’s claiming us in Black anthology: adult adoptees claim their space (2016) (pp. 80–87) on adoptees reclaiming agency.
- Preface to Lettres du Bangwe (2021) Pages 11–15, a collection focused on testimonies and letters.

== Film and Documentaries ==
Gay's documentary Ouvrir La Voix (2017) gives space to the testimonies of 24 French-speaking women of African descent. The film, self-produced and self-distributed, offers an intersectional exploration of gender and racial stereotypes lived by Black women in Europe, connecting their experiences to histories of colonialism and discrimination.

Her second feature documentary, Une Histoire à Soi (2021), is an archival film portraying international adoption via the stories of five adult adoptees from Brazil, Sri Lanka, Rwanda, South Korea, and Australia. The film addresses themes of racism, uprooting, "White Saviorism," and complex relationships within adoptive families.

Gay is also the director of the documentary series Ballroom (2025) (France Télévisions) which explores the lively and activist ballroom scene of Greater Paris, following the House of Revlon—a collective of LGBTQIA+ and racialized performers. The series, consisting of five 30-minute episodes, presents the hybrid challenges and aspirations of its protagonists as they navigate marginalization and visibility.

== Other Projects ==
Since 2018, Amandine Gay has organized the "Month of the Adopted" (Le Mois des Adopté·es), an annual series of events taking place in November across France, Switzerland, Belgium, and Quebec. Inspired by the National Adoption Awareness Month in Anglophone countries, the project offers panels, film screenings, and workshops aimed at reclaiming the narrative for adoptees—now mostly adults. Events address not only psychological and familial issues, but also political, economic, and racial dimensions, including the high cost of international adoption and the directionality of child transfers (predominantly from the Global South to the Global North).

Gay also regularly lectures on afrofeminism, cultural industries, intersectionality, and adoption.
