= Legendary (TV series) =

American reality competition television series

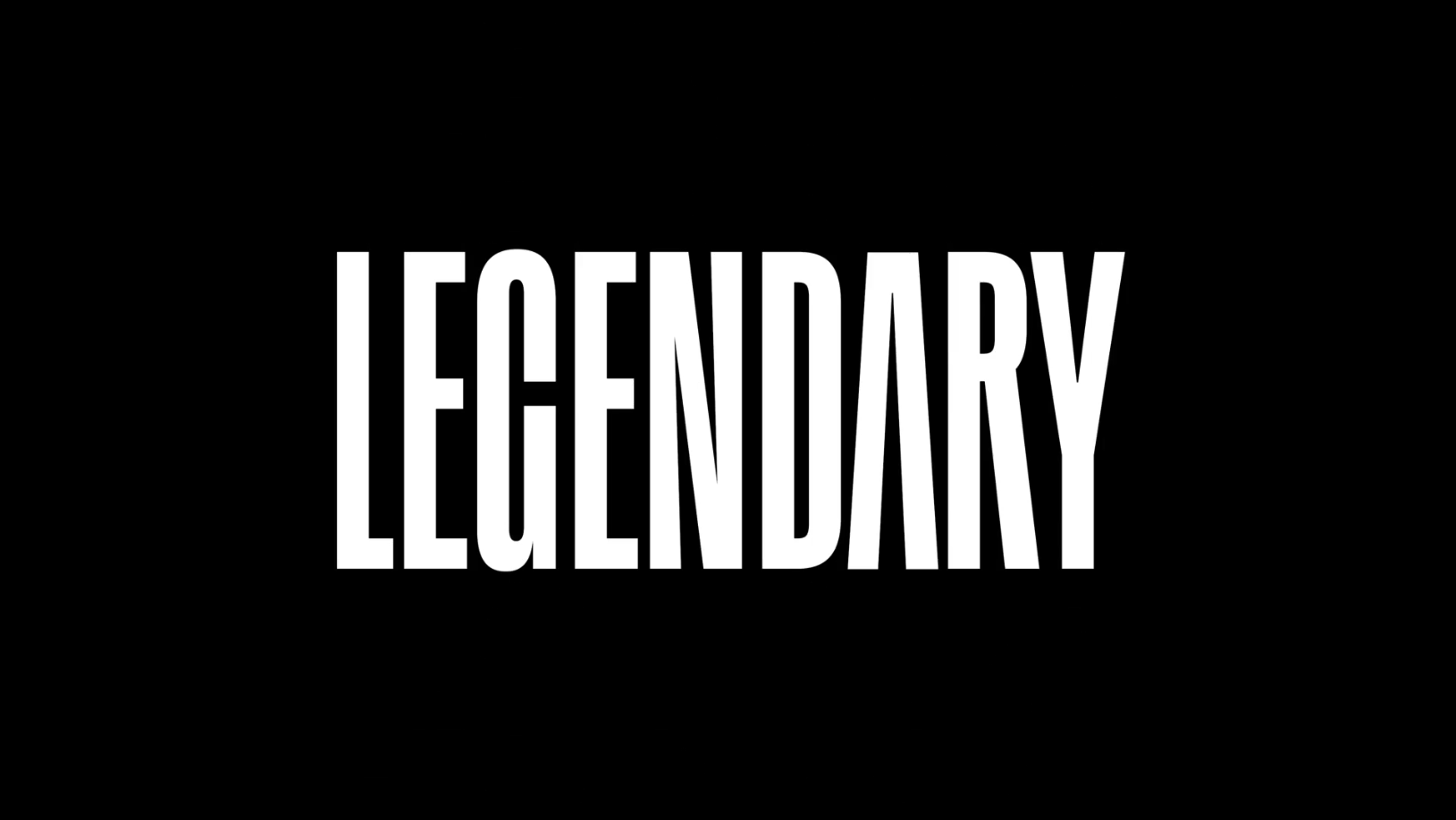
- Genre: Reality competition
- Directed by: Rik Reinholdtsen
- Presented by: Dashaun Wesley
- Judges: Jameela Jamil; Law Roach; Leiomy Maldonado; Megan Thee Stallion; Keke Palmer
- Theme music composer: MikeQ; James Blake; Ash B
- Country of origin: United States
- No. of seasons: 3
- No. of episodes: 29

Production
- Executive producers: David Collins; Michael Williams; Rob Eric; Jane Y. Mun; Josh Greenberg; Renata Lombardo; Shant Tutunjian
- Cinematography: Bob Aumer; Clint Childers
- Running time: 50 minutes
- Production company: Scout Productions

Original release
- Network: HBO Max
- Release: May 27, 2020 – June 9, 2022

Legendary is an American voguing reality competition television series, exploring the world of ball culture. It premiered on HBO Max on May 27, 2020. The series follows LGBTQ house members—predominantly from eight to ten houses—as they navigate through nine balls (dancing/voguing/walking events), with US$100,000 prize for the winning house. As such, the series was praised by GLAAD for featuring queer and trans artists "from the New York ballroom scene."

In July 2020, HBO Max renewed the series for a second season. It premiered on May 6, 2021.

In June 2021, HBO Max renewed the series for a third season. It premiered on May 19, 2022.

After three seasons, HBO Max canceled the series in December 2022 and removed it from their streaming service. On January 31, 2023 it was announced that the series would be released on The Roku Channel and Tubi.

== Cast ==
Each episode features a fashion and performance coaches responsible for polishing the houses' looks and moves on the dancefloor.

- Dashaun Wesley as Master of Ceremonies
- MikeQ as DJ
- Johnny Wujek as Fashion Coach (seasons 1–2)
- Tanisha Scott as Performance Coach
  - Jamari Balmain as Assistant Choreographer (season 2)

Judges on Legendary
Judge	Season		
Judge	1	2	3
Jameela Jamil	Main	Main	Main
Law Roach	Main	Main	Main
Leiomy Maldonado	Main	Main	Main
Megan Thee Stallion	Main	Main	
Keke Palmer			Main

== Format ==
The contestants compete in groups named Houses, from which members perform individually or in groups in pre-assigned categories in front of a panel of judges. For seasons 1 and 2, each House is allowed to include five members, including a leader called the Mother or Father of the House. The panel is composed by four permanent judges and a fifth guest judge that changes on each episode.

Most categories involve a qualifying round, in which the member or group representing each house first perform for the judges, who according to ballroom terminology show their approval by giving them a "ten", or their disapproval by giving them a "chop". To advance, a contestant must receive no chops from any judges. In the second round, contestants face each other in knockout battles until only one of them remains, who is named the winner of the category. The winner of each battle is decided by a majority of the votes from the judges.

As an exception, when a category involves all the members of a House, instead of a qualifying round and a battle round each house performs in front of the judges and receives critiques, and then a winner is determined by consensus from the judges.

After all categories are judged, the judges deliberate to decide which House had the best performance overall and name them the Superior House of the Week, and which two Houses had the worst performance. The Mother or Father of each House in the bottom names a member of the House to participate in a vogue redemption battle to be decided by the judges. The House of the winner of the redemption battle is allowed to remain in the competition, while the House of the loser of the battle is eliminated.

In the second season, a format change was introduced, with judges scoring each performance and the sum of the scores from the judges being used to determine the standing of the Houses.

== Episodes ==
Season	Episodes	Originally released	
Season	Episodes	First released	Last released
1	9	May 27, 2020	July 9, 2020
2	10	May 6, 2021	June 10, 2021
3	10	May 19, 2022	June 9, 2022

== Awards and nominations ==
Year	Award	Category	Nominee(s)	Result	Ref.
2021	Critics' Choice Real TV Awards	Best Competition Series: Talent/Variety	Legendary	Nominated	
2021	GLAAD Media Awards	Outstanding Reality Program	Legendary	Nominated	
2021	Guild of Music Supervisors Awards	Best Music Supervision – Reality Television	Matthew Hearon-Smith	Nominated	
2021	MTV Movie & TV Awards: Unscripted	Best Competition Series	Legendary	Nominated	
2021	MTV Movie & TV Awards: Unscripted	Best Fight	Law Roach vs. Dominique Jackson	Nominated	
2021	Primetime Creative Arts Emmy Awards	Outstanding Contemporary Hairstyling for a Variety, Nonfiction or Reality Program	Jerilynn Stephens, Kimi Messina, Dean Banowetz, Kathleen Leonard, Suzette Boozer, Dwayne Ross, Tamara Tripp, and Johnny Lomeli (for "Pop Tart")	Nominated	
2021	Primetime Creative Arts Emmy Awards	Outstanding Contemporary Makeup for a Variety, Nonfiction or Reality Program (Non-Prosthetic)	Tonia Green, Tyson Fountaine, Silvia Leczel, Jennifer Fregozo, Glen Alen Gutierrez, Sean Conklin, Valente Frazier, and Marcel Banks (for "Pop Tart")	Nominated	
2021	Realscreen Awards	Competition – Talent & Studio-Based Competition	Legendary	Nominated	
2021	Television Critics Association Awards	Outstanding Achievement in Reality Programming	Legendary	Nominated	
2021	Webby Awards	Top Television & Film (Series & Campaigns): Social	HBO Max for HBO Max's TikTok #LegendaryChallenge	Nominated	
2021	Webby Awards	Top Diversity & Inclusion (Series & Campaigns): Social	HBO Max's Legendary Voices	Nominated	
2022	Hollywood Critics Association TV Awards	Best Streaming Reality Show or Competition Series	Legendary	Nominated	
2022	Make-Up Artists and Hair Stylists Guild Awards	Best Contemporary Makeup in a Television Special, One-Hour or More Live Program Series or Movie for Television	Tonia Nichole Green, Tyson Fountaine, Glen Alen, and Valente Frazier	Nominated	
2022	Make-Up Artists and Hair Stylists Guild Awards	Best Period and/or Character Make-Up in a Television Special, One-Hour or More Live Program Series or Movie for Television	Tonia Green, Tyson Fountaine, Silvia Leczel, and Jennifer Fregozo	Nominated	
2022	Make-Up Artists and Hair Stylists Guild Awards	Best Special Make-Up Effects in a Television Special, One-Hour or More Live Program Series or Movie for Television	Tonia Nichole Green, Tyson Fountaine, Sean Conklin, and Marcel Banks	Nominated	
2022	Make-Up Artists and Hair Stylists Guild Awards	Best Contemporary Hair Styling in a Television Special, One-Hour or More Live Program Series or Movie for Television	Jerilynn Stephens, Kimi Messina, Kathleen Leonard, and Dean Banowetz	Nominated	
2022	Make-Up Artists and Hair Stylists Guild Awards	Best Period Hair Styling and/or Character Hair Styling in a Television Special, One-Hour or More Live Program Series or Movie for Television	Jerilynn Stephens, Kimi Messina, Kathleen Leonard, and Dean Banowetz	Won	
2022	Primetime Creative Arts Emmy Awards	Outstanding Contemporary Makeup for a Variety, Nonfiction or Reality Program (Non-Prosthetic)	Tonia Green, Tyson Fountaine, Sean Conklin, Marcel Banks, Jennifer Fregozo, Silvia Leczel, and Glen Alen (for "Whorror House")	Won	
2022	Television Critics Association Awards	Outstanding Achievement in Reality Programming	Legendary	Won	
2022	Dorian Awards	Best Reality Show	Legendary	Nominated	
2023	Make-Up Artists and Hair Stylists Guild Awards	Best Contemporary Makeup in a Television Special, One-Hour or More Live Program Series or Movie for Television	Tonia Green, Tyson Fountaine, Silvia Leczel, Sean Conklin	Won	
2023	Make-Up Artists and Hair Stylists Guild Awards	Best Period and/or Character Make-Up in a Television Special, One-Hour or More Live Program Series or Movie for Television	Tonia Green, Tyson Fountaine, Jennifer Fregozo, Glen Alen	Nominated	
2023	Make-Up Artists and Hair Stylists Guild Awards	Best Special Make-Up Effects in a Television Special, One-Hour or More Live Program Series or Movie for Television	Tonia Green, Tyson Fountaine, Marcel Banks, Sean Conklin	Nominated	
2023	Make-Up Artists and Hair Stylists Guild Awards	Best Contemporary Hair Styling in a Television Special, One-Hour or More Live Program Series or Movie for Television	Jerilynn Stephens, Kimi Messina, Dean Francis Banowetz, Lalisa Turner	Won	
2023	Make-Up Artists and Hair Stylists Guild Awards	Best Period Hair Styling and/or Character Hair Styling in a Television Special, One-Hour or More Live Program Series or Movie for Television	Jerilynn Stephens, Kimi Messina, Johnny Lomeli, Suzette Boozer	Nominated	
2023	GLAAD Media Awards	Outstanding Reality Competition Program	Legendary	Nominated	
