= Aariana Rose Philip =

Antiguan-American model and activist

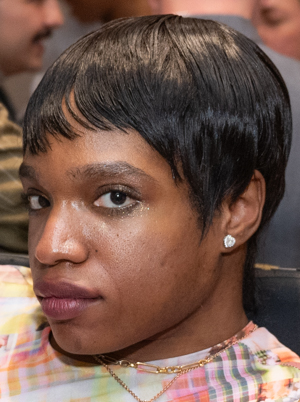
- Philip in 2024
- Born: March 15, 2001 (age 25); Antigua
- Occupations: Model, musician, artist, author
- Years active: 2018–present
- Modeling information
- Height: 5 ft 4 in (1.63 m)
- Hair color: Black
- Eye color: Brown
- Agency: Community New York (New York), Supreme Management New York (New York), Supreme Management Paris (Paris), The MiLK Collective (London), D'Management Group (Milan)

Aariana Rose Philip (born March 15, 2001) is an Antiguan-American model, activist and musician.

In 2018, she became the first Black, transgender, and physically disabled model to be represented by a major modeling agency, and has since modeled in several fashion photo shoots and campaigns. In 2021, Philip debuted as an exclusive for Moschino's spring/summer 2022 fashion show—making her the first model using a wheelchair to walk for a major luxury fashion brand.

== Career ==
In 2016 at age 14, Philip published a memoir called This Kid Can Fly: It's About Ability (Not Disability) detailing her experiences during childhood with quadriplegic cerebral palsy. The book was co-written with writer Tanya Bolden and published by HarperCollins.

Philip has modeled for W, i-D, Dazed, ELLE, Allure, and Paper magazines, as well as Refinery29 and Now This. In 2018, Philip was profiled in The New York Times, which hailed her career as a sign of a more diverse fashion industry.

In 2019, Philip appeared on the cover of Paper magazine's "Pride" issue, interviewed by supermodel Naomi Campbell. In that same year, she also appeared on the September issue cover of S Moda for El Pais. In 2021, Philip was featured on the spring/summer 2021 cover of INDIE Magazine. Philip has appeared in editorials for Vogue Italia, Vogue Polska and Vogue Portugal, and has appeared in campaigns for Dove, Sephora, Outdoor Voices, and Nike.

Philip made her first runway appearance in 2019, when she closed a show for Willie Norris Workshop. She has modeled for American fashion brand Collina Strada's runway shows and lookbooks. In 2019, Marc Jacobs collaborated with Philip on several media projects. That same year, she made her late night talk-show television debut on TBS's Full Frontal with Samantha Bee, wearing Runway Marc Jacobs. In 2020, Jeremy Scott, former creative director of Italian luxury fashion brand Moschino, tapped Philip as the face of the brand's fall/winter 2020 campaign, shot by photographers Luigi and Iango. In 2021, she debuted exclusively for Moschino's spring/summer 2022 runway show at New York Fashion Week, making her the first model using a wheelchair to walk in a runway show for a major luxury fashion brand.

In 2023, Philip appeared on the cover of British Vogue's May issue alongside actor Selma Blair, writer and disability advocate Sinéad Burke, model Ellie Goldstein, and ASL interpreter/performer Justina Miles.

Later in 2023, Philip's physical likeness was featured in the Metropolitan Museum of Art Costume Institute's Women Dressing Women exhibit as a custom mannequin sculpture in collaboration with American fashion brand Collina Strada. In 2024, Philip signed with Supreme Management New York. In 2025, she signed with Supreme Management Paris.

In 2025, Philip began self-releasing alternative electronic and experimental music, producing and writing her own material independently. That same year, she began an NTS Radio guest artist residency, highlighting her sonic direction.

In October 2025, Philip appeared on the cover of Vogue Netherlands alongside photographer, model and socialite Richie Shazam and model Valentine Alvarez. Later in 2025, Philip was featured in Vogue's coverage of the CFDA/Vogue Fashion Fund's adaptive fashion design challenge as the muse and collaborator of designer Bach Mai, with whom she co-created the look presented for the challenge.

She attended the Met Gala in 2026, becoming the first wheelchair user to do so. She wore Collina Strada.

== Personal life ==
Philip was born in Antigua and Barbuda and diagnosed with quadriplegic cerebral palsy as a baby. She and her family relocated to the United States when she was three years old, and have resided in New York City since. Philip is known for her prolific social media presence, most notably starting out on her former blog as a child.

== Recognition ==
Philip was listed as part of Teen Vogue's 21 Under 21 for 2018 and 2020.

In 2019, Out magazine named Philip and Teddy Quinlivan as Out100 Models of the Year.

Philip was recognized as a Dazed 100 model in 2019, which recognizes prominent influences in youth culture.

In February 2020, Philip was featured on Beyoncé's website as a part of the "This is Black History" series of #BEYGOOD.

== See also ==
- LGBTQ culture in New York City
- List of LGBTQ people in New York City
- Transgender culture of New York City
