= Geena Rocero =

Filipino-American trans model (born 1983)

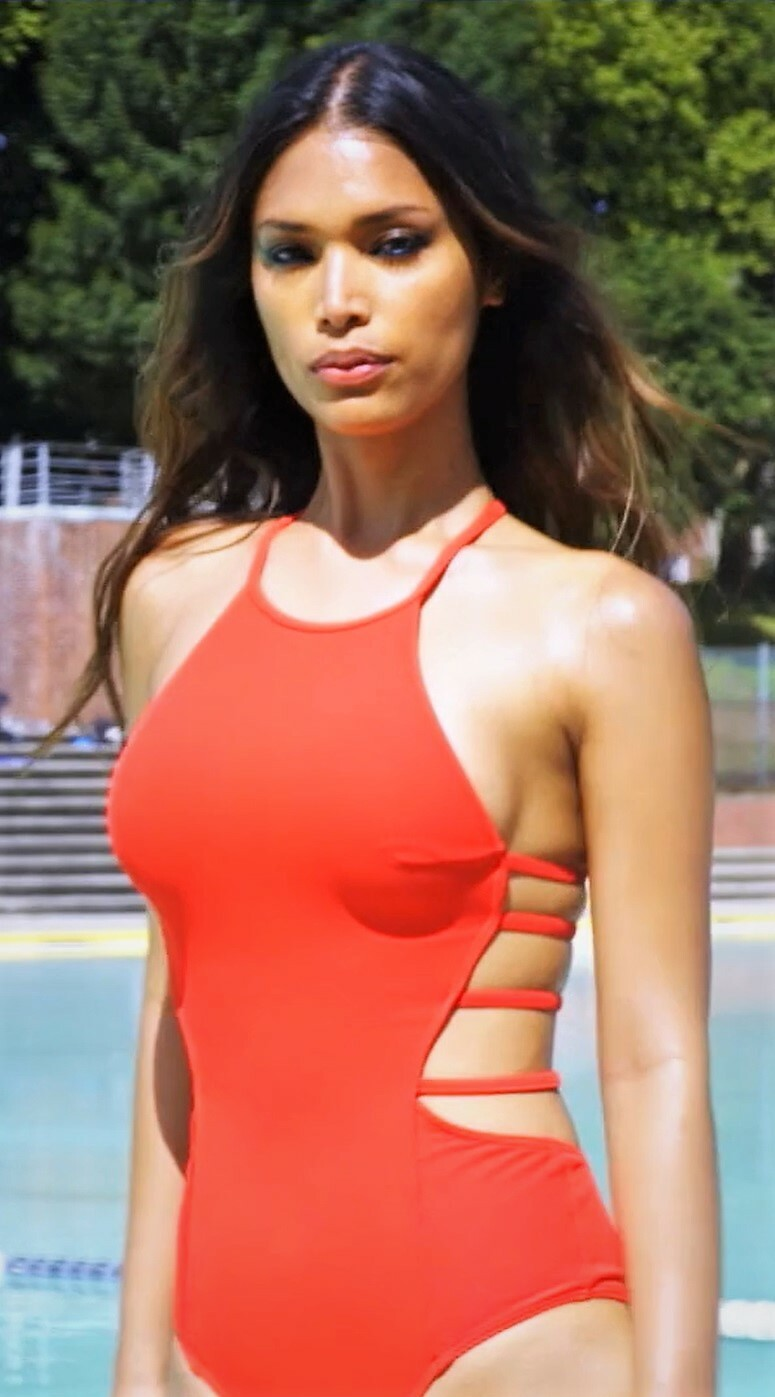
- Rocero advertising for Chromat in 2018
- Born: 1983 (age 42–43); Manila, Philippines
- Occupation: Model
- Years active: 2002–present
- Organization: Gender Proud

Geena Rocero (born 1983) is a Filipino-born American model, TED speaker, and transgender advocate based in New York City. Rocero is the founder of Gender Proud, a media production company that tells stories of the transgender community worldwide to elevate justice and equality. Rocero has spoken about transgender rights at the United Nations Headquarters, the World Economic Forum, and the White House.

== Early life ==
Geena Rocero was born in Manila to a working-class family. She started competing in beauty pageants at age 15. Rocero immigrated to San Francisco, California, at age 17. In 2005, she moved to New York City, and she became a U.S. citizen in 2006.

== Career ==
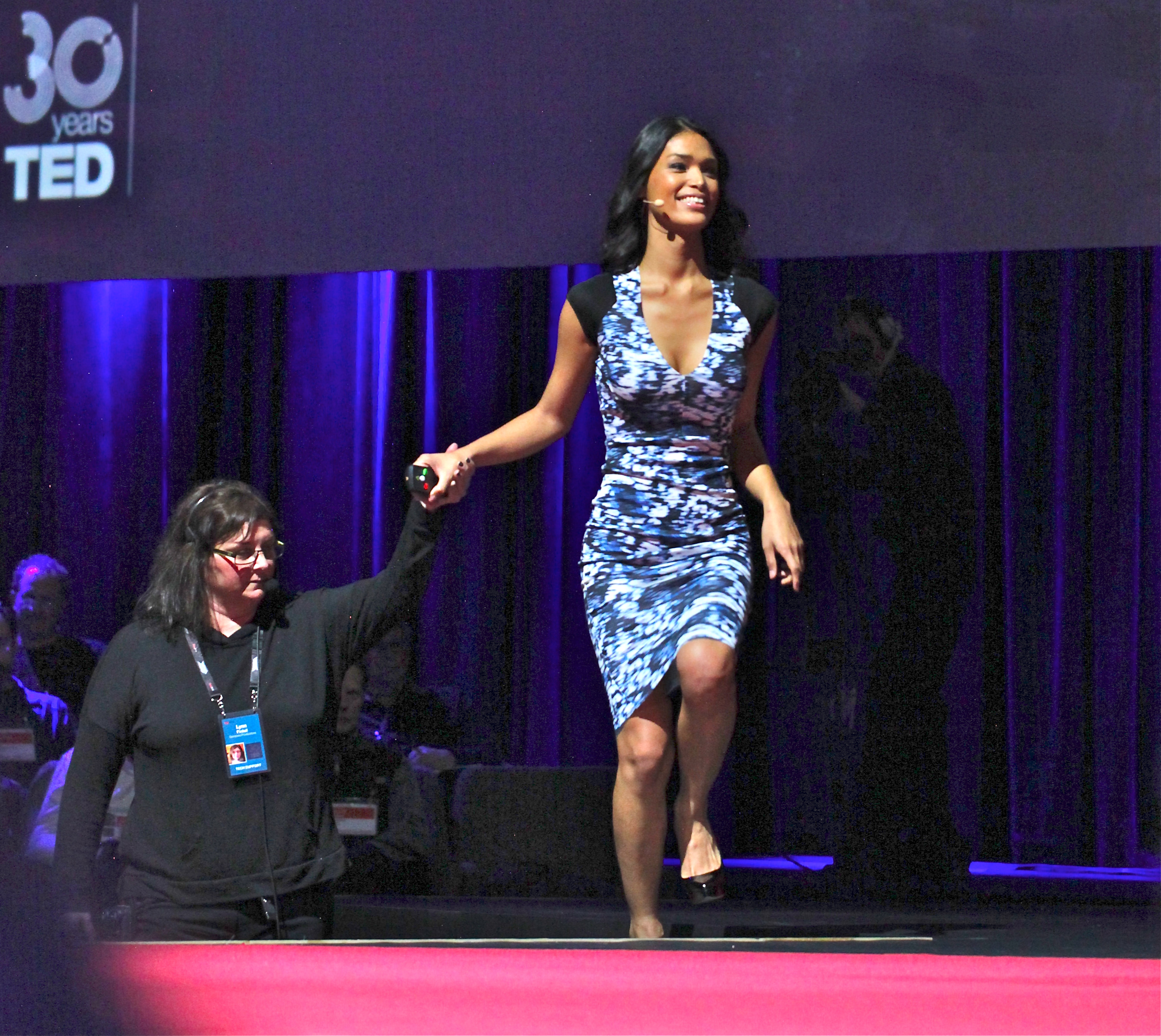
Rocero takes the stage in Vancouver to come out as transgender on International Transgender Day of Visibility, March 2014

Rocero was discovered by a fashion photographer in a restaurant on the Lower East Side of Manhattan when she was 21 years old. She was then signed to NEXT Model Management and spent 12 years modeling for international swimsuit and beauty editorials, earning herself a large fan base.

She made history as the first trans woman to be part of the iconic Playboy Playmates of the Year in 2020.

In 2014, Rocero was featured on the fifth anniversary cover of C☆NDY magazine along with 13 other transgender women: Janet Mock, Carmen Carrera, Laverne Cox, Isis King, Gisele Alicea (Gisele Xtravaganza), Leyna Ramous, Dina Marie, Nina Poon, Juliana Huxtable, Niki M'nray, Pêche Di, Carmen Xtravaganza and Yasmine Petty.

Adding to her résumé in 2015, Rocero became Executive Producer of "Beautiful As I Want To Be", a digital series for Logo focused on transgender youth. The show spotlights young trans people, and pairs them with a coach or mentor in the trans community. In the first episode, Zeam, a young trans man and artist, is paired with Caitlyn Jenner. Jenner in the episode mentions Rocero as "the first trans person I ever met". Rocero has also been featured on Jenner's show I Am Cait.

In 2016 Rocero and Tracey Norman became the first two openly transgender models to appear on the cover of an edition of Harper's Bazaar. She became the Playboy Playmate of the Month for August 2019. She was the first openly transgender Asian-Pacific Islander model to pose for Playboy magazine.

Rocero made her directorial debut for the 2021 four-part documentary series "Caretakers," highlighting Filipino-Americans during the COVID-19 pandemic.

== Activism ==
In 2014, Rocero launched Gender Proud, "an advocacy & awareness campaign that aims to advance the rights of all transgender individuals". On March 31, 2014, in honor of International Transgender Day of Visibility, Rocero came out as transgender while giving a TED talk in Vancouver, Canada. On September 19, 2014, excerpts of Rocero's TED talk were featured on NPR's TED Radio Hour podcast.

Rocero is the founder of Gender Proud, which is a media production company that tell stories about transgender and what it means to be gender nonconforming. Rocero and her production company have produced and presented "Beautiful as I want to Be", which talks about transgender youth. Another film is called" Willing and Able", which talks about transgender employment and athletes. The two-film won a GLAAD Media award. She's a board member of NY LGBT Center and An Ambassador for The Stonewall.

== See also ==
- Filipinos in the New York metropolitan area
- LGBT culture in New York City
- List of LGBT people from New York City
- List of LGBT rights activists
- NYC Pride March
- Transgender culture of New York City
