= Carmen Carrera =

American actress and model (born 1985)

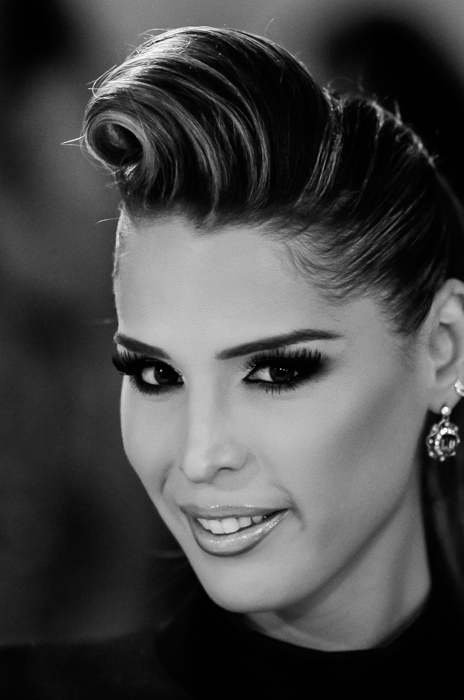
- Carmen Carrera at New York Fashion Week in September 2011
- Born: April 13, 1985 (age 41); Elmwood Park, New Jersey, U.S.
- Other name: Gabriella Carrera
- Occupations: Model, actress, showgirl
- Years active: 2011–present
- Spouse: Adrian Torres (m. 2015–2021)
- Modeling information
- Height: 5 ft 10 in (1.78 m)
- Agency: Wilhelmina Models
- Website: carmencarrera.com

Carmen Carrera (born April 13, 1985) is an American reality television personality, model, burlesque performer, and actress, known for appearing on the third season of the Logo reality television series RuPaul's Drag Race, as well as its spin-off series RuPaul's Drag U. Carrera is a transgender woman and transgender rights activist.

== Life and career ==
Carrera was born in Elmwood Park, New Jersey. In 2011, she appeared in the third season of the reality television competition show, RuPaul's Drag Race. Carrera is the second contestant in the history of the show (after season three castmate, Shangela) to rejoin the cast after being eliminated, and along with Raja, Manila Luzon, and Delta Work, was part of the clique known as the "Heathers", which took its name from the 1988 film, Heathers. In episode 10, "RuPaul-a-Palooza", Carrera was eliminated for her performance while lip-syncing to a reggae-inspired cover of RuPaul's song "Superstar". Judges Michelle Visage, Santino Rice, and Billy Brasfield voted to re-invite Carrera to the competition in episode 12, "Jocks in Frocks". Subsequently, Carrera was eliminated in that episode after styling a muscular male athlete in her own signature "nude"-style of drag.

The November 2011 issue of W featured a series of fictional products in realistically styled advertisements as part of an issue-wide art project. Carrera was featured in the series as the face for the fictional fragrance La Femme. In 2011, Carrera, along with third season Drag Race contestants Manila Luzon and Shangela Laquifa Wadley, appeared in a television commercial for the travel-related website Orbitz.

Carrera has also been active in AIDS awareness and activism. After being featured in a Gilead Sciences ad titled "Red Ribbon Runway" with fellow Drag Race co-stars Manila Luzon, Delta Work, Shangela Laquifa Wadley, and Alexis Mateo, the dress she wore was auctioned by Logo in commemoration of World AIDS Day. Proceeds from the auction were donated to the National Association of People with AIDS.

Carrera appeared as a "drag professor" in two episodes of the second season of RuPaul's Drag U. In the episode "80s Ladies", she gave singer Stacey Q a confidence-boosting makeover. Carrera appeared in recording artist Lovari's music video for "Take My Pain Away".

In an episode of the ABC news program Primetime: What Would You Do? that aired on May 4, 2012, Carrera portrayed the role of a transgender server working in a New Jersey diner. An actor playing a customer berates Carrera's character regarding his past experience of being served by her when she had presented as male, prompting other customers to come to Carrera's defense. This program also marked the first occasion in which Carrera publicly revealed herself to be transgender.

On June 11, 2012, Carrera appeared in an episode of the TLC series Cake Boss, "Bar Mitzvah, Beads & Oh Baby!", in which she unknowingly participated in a prank involving "Cousin Anthony" Bellifemine, the cousin of "Cake Boss" Buddy Valastro, who was set up with a date with Carrera. The punchline of the joke had Valastro tell Bellifemine that "... that's a man, baby!" Carrera, however, originally agreed to appear on the program to promote equality for the transgender community, not aware that she would be involved in a joke. Following the airing of the program, Carrera rebuked the situation on Facebook. Valastro subsequently apologized for the incident. The following day, on June 12, 2012, TLC announced that "Bar Mitzvah, Beads & Oh Baby!" had been pulled from rotation indefinitely, with the network planning to re-edit the episode for future broadcasts.

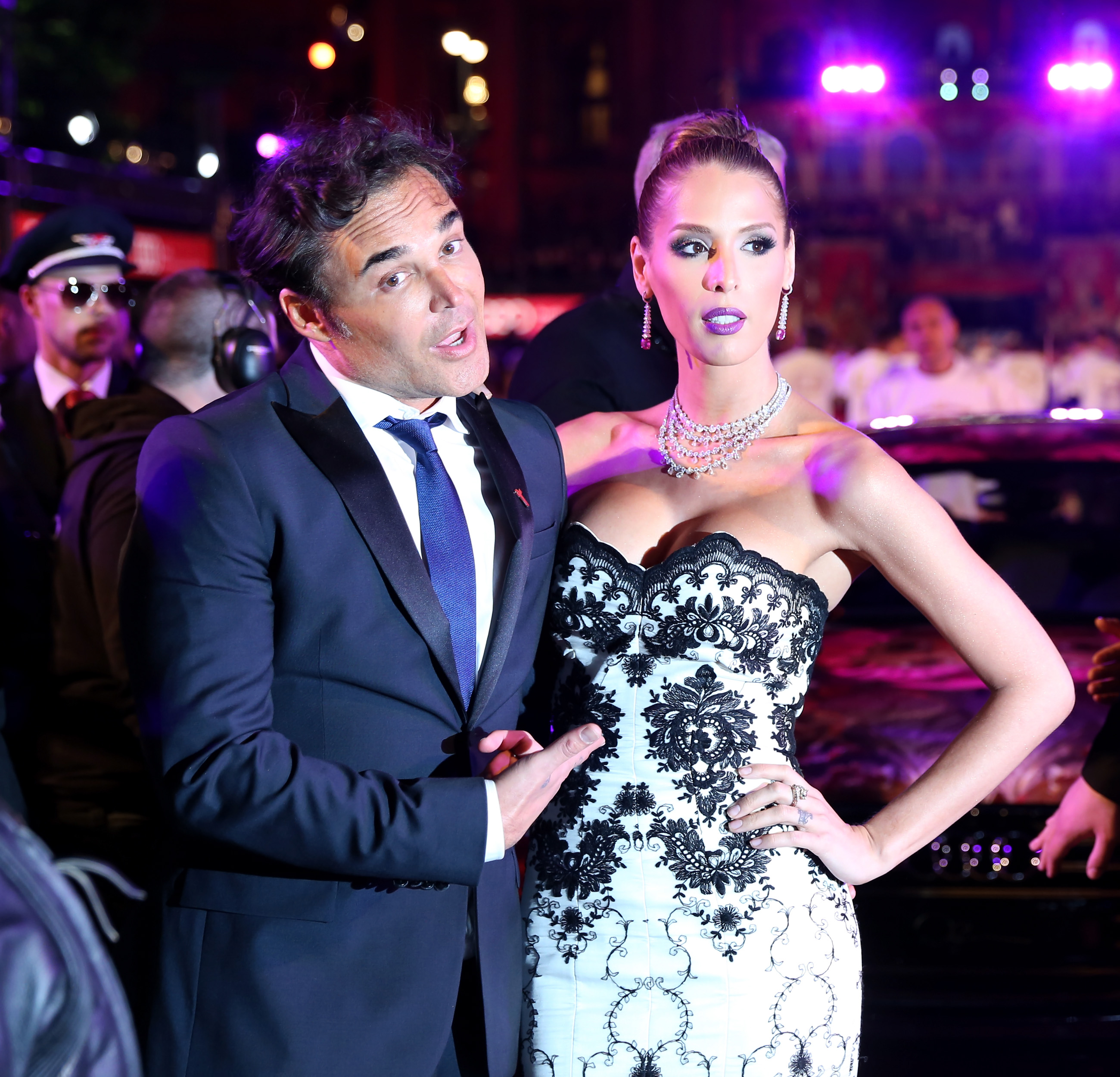
Carrera with David LaChapelle at Life Ball 2014

A petition started requesting that Carrera serve as a model during the 2013 Victoria's Secret Fashion Show, but despite media coverage and approximately 45,000 signatures, the petition was unsuccessful.

In March 2014, Carrera openly criticized RuPaul for use of the pejorative "she-male" on a RuPaul's Drag Race episode. She continued to be critical of RuPaul when the issue arose again in 2015, after Logo pulled the "Female or SheMale" game from Drag Race, which prompted RuPaul to defend the use of the word "tranny". Carrera's continued protests led to accusations by others that she was biting the hand that fed her. Carrera responded that, while she appreciates the opportunity to compete on Drag Race, she ultimately earned her status through her efforts and those of her agent, friends, fans, and family, and that she was not beholden to support RuPaul's use of transphobic language.

Carrera was featured in the work of photographer David LaChapelle. She posed for a poster for Life Ball, which has two versions; each depicts her with different genitalia to represent the blurring of gender identity.

In 2014, Carrera was included as part of the Advocate's annual "40 under 40" list and made a cameo appearance on Jane the Virgin's premiere episode.

Also in 2014, Carrera was featured on the fifth anniversary cover of C☆NDY magazine along with thirteen other transgender women: Janet Mock, Laverne Cox, Geena Rocero, Isis King, Gisele Alicea, Leyna Ramous, Dina Marie, Nina Poon, Juliana Huxtable, Niki M'nray, Pêche Di, Carmen Xtravaganza, and Yasmine Petty.

In 2023, Carrera was a part of AT&T's "Turn Up The Love" Pride Month campaign in Dallas, Texas alongside musicians Years & Years and Wrabel. The same year, she walked in the Nike, Natalia Fedner, Lila Nikole Rivera, and Michael Costello's fashion shows at Miami Swim Week.

== Personal life ==
Carrera was in a domestic partnership with Adrian Torres from 2009, but she announced in 2013 that they had separated. By 2015, the two had reunited, receiving relationship counseling while being filmed for the Couples Therapy television show. They wed on June 10, 2015, during filming for the show, which aired as the season finale on December 9, 2015. They later divorced in 2021.

Carrera had publicly identified as a gay man, and continued to present as such during filming of the third season of RuPaul's Drag Race, but began her gender transition when she concluded filming. She is of Puerto Rican-Peruvian ancestry.
