= Yasmine Petty =

American model

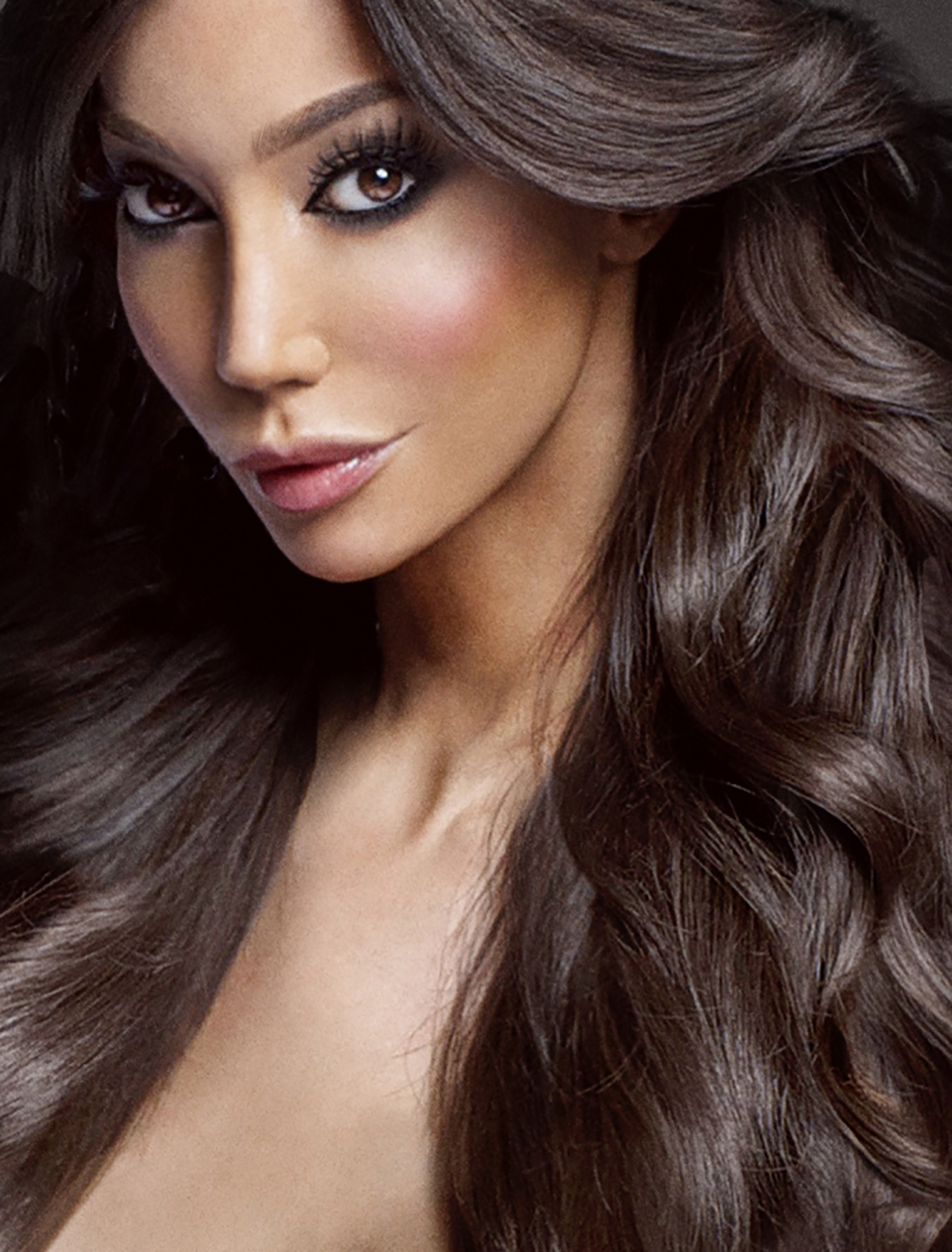
- Petty in 2014
- Born: San Diego, California, U.S.
- Other name: Jennifer Paris
- Occupation: Fashion model
- Modelling information
- Height: 5 ft 9 in (1.75 m)
- Hair colour: Brown
- Eye colour: Brown
- Website: www.yasmine-petty.com

Yasmine Petty is an American model. Petty mostly works as a runway and editorial fashion model in addition to having worked as an actress and photographer. Petty has modeled at international events such as New York Fashion Week and Life Ball. In 2014, Petty was featured on the fifth anniversary cover of C☆NDY magazine along with 13 other transgender women – Janet Mock, Carmen Carrera, Geena Rocero, Isis King, Gisele Alicea (Gisele Xtravaganza), Leyna Bloom, Dina Marie, Nina Poon, Juliana Huxtable, Niki M'nray, Pêche Di, Carmen Xtravaganza, and Laverne Cox. Petty studied photography at the International Center of Photography in New York City and fashion design at De Anza College in Cupertino, California.

== Filmography ==
- 2014: Dragula Yasmine Petty as Milla a hot club girl (short film) Directed by Frank Meli & Adam Shankman
- 2017: Bun in the Oven

== See also ==
- LGBT culture in New York City
- List of LGBT people from New York City
- NYC Pride March
- Transgender culture of New York City
