= Isis King =

American model, actress, and fashion designer (born 1985)

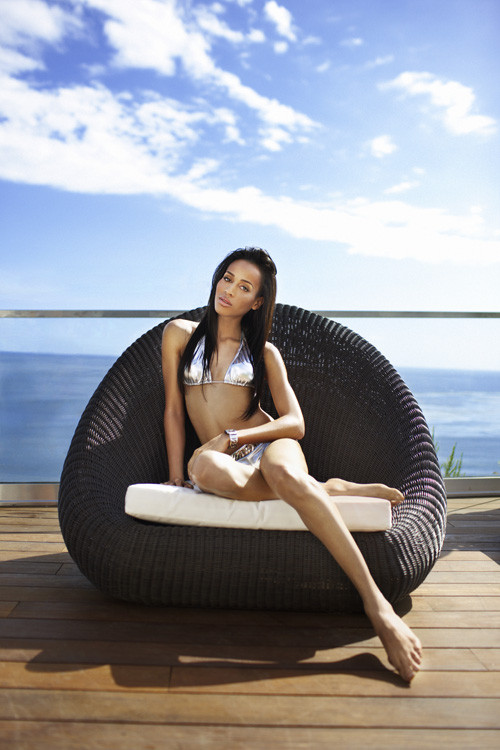
- King in 2008
- Born: October 1, 1985 (age 41); Prince George's County, Maryland, U.S.
- Modeling information
- Height: 5 ft 7 in (1.70 m)
- Website: kingisis.com

Isis King (born October 1, 1985) is an American model, actress, and fashion designer. King is most widely known for her role on both the eleventh cycle and the seventeenth cycle of the reality television show America's Next Top Model. She was the first openly trans woman to compete on the show, and became one of the most visible transgender people on television. King starred as Sol Perez on the Amazon Prime Video romantic comedy series With Love between 2021 and 2023.

== Biography ==
King was born as a male but has stated, "mentally and everything else" she was "born female." She has stated, people might refer to her as "transgender" or "transsexual", but she prefers the phrase "born in the wrong body". While in high school, King came out as "gay" but later felt it was not an accurate label for her.

King has an associate degree in design and illustration from the Art Institute of Philadelphia. King moved to New York to begin her transition, but didn’t earn enough money to afford rent, and her family opposed her transition. As a result, she moved into the Ali Forney Center for homeless LGBTQ youth.

In 2007, King appeared in an MSNBC special titled Born in the Wrong Body, which documented the lives of transgender teens from across the United States. King began hormone replacement therapy in the summer of 2007, as part of her transitioning process. She had gender reassignment surgery in 2009, which she stated on America's Next Top Model: All-Stars.

== Early career ==
King had been runway modeling for seven years before participating in America's Next Top Model. Her experience included competing in the underground ball culture scene. In a promotional interview for ANTM, King stated she was looking forward to runway as she had been "walking" for seven years.

She has also worked as a receptionist at a hair salon, and as a program assistant for a nonprofit organization.

== America's Next Top Model ==
=== America's Next Top Model Cycle 10 ===
King was living at the Ali Forney Transitional Living Program when she learned about an upcoming photo shoot for the tenth cycle of America's Next Top Model.

=== America's Next Top Model Cycle 11 ===
King asked ANTM art director Jay Manuel whether she could be accepted as a girl "born in the wrong body" if she were to audition as a contestant for the program. After the shoot, show host and producer Tyra Banks had her staff search out King to encourage her to audition based on her performance in the photo shoot. King was the twelfth finalist selected (just before Clark Gilmer and Joslyn Pennywell filled the final two places) for the top fourteen to compete on the reality television show America's Next Top Model Cycle 11. She received one second call-out (after Marjorie Conrad) and survived the bottom two over Nikeysha Clarke. She became the fifth eliminated overall in her second bottom two appearance after eventual runner up, Samantha Potter, survived for the first time ever.

Isis King began posing for a photography set primarily concentrated on youth homelessness, which became the catalyst for her returning for cycle 17.

=== America's Next Top Model Cycle 17: All-Stars ===
After her first appearance on the show, King was selected to return to America's Next Top Model along with former fellow contestant Sheena Sakai to both represent their Cycle together on the first All-Star edition of the show along with twelve other returning models from past America's Next Top Model cycles. During her time on the show, she received one first call-out in the first week and was eliminated third after former Cycle 12 semifinalist and Cycle 14 contestant Angelea Preston survived her first-ever bottom two appearance.

Taz Tagore, co-founder of the Reciprocity Foundation, said that King had an agenda when participating in Cycle 17, she wanted to break the stigma and destroy the barriers for those who identify with the LGBTQ+ community. She became a role model for women in that community.

== After ANTM ==
King appeared on The Tyra Banks Show twice. In her first appearance she discussed her life story further, along with fellow contestant Clark Gilmer. Banks surprised King by introducing her to Marci Bowers, a fellow trans woman and top gender reassignment surgeon, who offered her an all-expenses-paid surgery which was conducted in 2009. New shots were taken after the surgery, which were revealed in King’s second appearance. King's transition to being anatomically female was deemed "complete." She also appeared on Larry King Live on July 25, 2009. King competed in the seventeenth overall and first 'All Star' cycle of America's Next Top Model, which aired on the September 14, 2011. She was eliminated.

Since then King has worked with American Apparel, making her the first transgender person to do so.

In July 2015, Isis was a guest star on multiple episodes of the soap opera The Bold and the Beautiful.

King played Gia in a guest role on season 7 of the Showtime show Shameless.

In Fall 2016, King's docu-series Strut, executive produced by Whoopi Goldberg, aired on the Oxygen Network. It followed five trans models, and documented King's move from New York to Los Angeles.

In 2019, she starred in the Netflix series When They See Us, created by Ava DuVernay, a series about the real story of the Central Park Five. She plays Marci, the deceased older sister of Korey Wise. King said that playing this role is ‘like a magnifying glass on the world right now’(express online). King’s role is “relatable to who she is as a person.” She feels like transgender women of color are especially at risk of being the victim of murder, as Marci Wise suffered.

In August 2019, King was the subject of a Deadline interview. In it she discussed trans visibility, acceptance, and other matters.

On July 3, 2020, King appeared on fellow America's Next Top Model star Jay Manuel's weekly web chat, Jays Chat, to discuss the show's Cycle 11, on which she made her debut.

King is now signed with AEFH Talent for Theatrical, and A3 Artist Agency for commercial work in Los Angeles.

=== Print work ===
King appeared in Us Weekly (September 2008), Seventeen magazine (December 2008/January 2009), Out magazine, Mallard International magazine, and the cover of the Spring 2010 Swerv magazine. King also did a variety of test shots that were used to promote her visit to The Tyra Banks Show. In 2012 she became American Apparel's first openly transgender model. However, Media Advocates Giving National Equality to Transsexual & Transgender People (MAGNET), an anti-defamation organization dedicated to educating the media about transsexual, transgender, and intersex issues, launched an education campaign against the t-shirts King modeled because they say "Gay O.K.", which some feel is misleading since King is a straight transgender woman. Chanel Jessica Lopez, a transsexual and transgender communities based counselor at New York City's Anti-Violence Project, called for a boycott of the t-shirts for the same reason.

In 2014, King was featured on the fifth anniversary cover of C☆NDY magazine along with 13 other transgender women: Janet Mock, Carmen Carrera, Geena Rocero, Laverne Cox, Gisele Alicea, Leyna Ramous, Dina Marie, Nina Poon, Juliana Huxtable, Niki M'nray, Peche Di, Carmen Xtravaganza, and Yasmine Petty.

== Cultural impact ==
King is one of a small but growing number of transgender people and characters in film and television, and her inclusion on ANTM has been called an "unprecedented opportunity" by Neil Giuliano, president of GLAAD. By competing on the show, King has brought national and prime time attention to issues of gender transitioning and gender expression. New York magazine has called King the cause célèbre of Cycle 11, comparing her to previous contestant "issues" featured on the show such as Cycle 9 contestant Heather Kuzmich's Asperger syndrome. ANTM executive producer Ken Mok stated her casting was done in support of "redefin[ing] what beauty is," one of "Tyra's original missions" for the show.

Due to the intimate nature of the program, which films the contestants living together during the several weeks of the competition, GLAAD spokesman Damon Romine noted "the show deals head on with the contestants confronting their own phobias. Facets of King's transitioning process have been portrayed in the show, such as her hormone injections and subsequent nausea. There's going to be support, and the reverse of that. It opens the door for the other girls and the viewers to get to know King and the transgender community." Some of King's fellow contestants revealed prejudices and misunderstandings about transgender issues, and others commented about how her gender transitioning would be poorly received in their own small communities or in the southern United States. Contestants have referred to King pejoratively as a "he/she" and a "drag queen".

New York magazine noted that King is one of few transgender models in history to rise to public prominence, comparing her to Teri Toye, former club kid Amanda Lepore, and the gender-bending club promoter and model André J. Simon Doonan, creative director of Barneys New York, told ABC News that the time may be right for a transgender supermodel: "Maybe it's time for a tranny [sic] to end up on the cover of Vogue."

== Personal life ==
King is a practising Christian, and attends Mosaic Church in Los Angeles.

Her younger sister Chanel died as a baby after being born with all of her organs outside of her body. Because of that, Isis King has participated in the Catwalk for Cause, where all the proceeds go to Johns Hopkins Children's Center in Baltimore.

In 2016, she began to focus on her acting and modeling skills and moved to Los Angeles.

She is a motivational speaker and shares her experiences to schools across the country.

King identifies as being on the asexual spectrum.

== Filmography ==
=== Film and television ===
Year	Title	Role	Note
2007	Born in the Wrong Body 2: On the Edge	Herself	
2008	America's Next Top Model	Self	Cycle 11; 10th place
2010	Bella Maddo	Cassandra	Short film
2011	America's Next Top Model: All Stars	Self	Cycle 17; 12th place
2013	Hello Forever	Rommy	Film
2015	The Bold and the Beautiful	Sonja	3 episodes
2016	Strut	Self	6 episodes
2016	Shameless	Gia	Episode: "Own Your Sh*t"
2017	The Heart of a Woman	Rosie	Short film
2017-21	Hey Qween!	Self	Celebrity guest
2018	Grown	Bea	Episode: "Viral"
2019	Dark/Web	Jersey	Episode: "Chapter Two"
2019	When They See Us	Marci Denise Wise	Miniseries
2019	Savage X Fenty Show	Herself	Amazon Prime Video fashion special
2019	Stonewall Outloud	Self	Documentary short
2020	Equal	Alexis	HBO Max docuseries
2021	Good Trouble	Brooke	Episode: "Arraignment Day"
2021	The L Word: Generation Q	Claudia Hanson	Episode: "Launch Party"
2021-23	With Love	Sol Perez	Amazon Prime Video series; Main role

=== Podcasts ===
Year	Title	Role	Notes
Dec. 4, 2017	LGBTQ&A	Herself	"Isis King: Paris is Burning Changed My Life"
unknown	Not So Glamorous	Herself	"I'm A Trans Model w/ Isis King"

== See also ==
- List of transgender characters in film and television
- List of transgender people
