= House of Ladosha =

American hip hop group

House of Ladosha is a New York City-based artistic collective and LGBT rap duo including Antonio Blair ("Dosha Devastation aka La Fem LaDosha") and Adam Radakovich ("Cunty Crawford"). Other members include Neon Christina Ladosha (Christopher Udemezue), Magatha Ladosha (Michael Magnan), YSL Ladosha (Yan Sze Li), General Rage Ladosha (Riley Hooker), and Juliana Huxtable. Many of the members met as freshmen at Parsons School of Design. The group was founded in 2007. They have opened for Azealia Banks and performed with SSION. The last recorded time that House of Ladosha was in-person for an event was April 10, 2019. Member Juliana Huxtable has been in Berlin while being unable to perform, joining local protests against racism and police brutality.

House of Ladosha proposes chic, politically conscious designs for the world that the LGBT community wants. Members of the House of Ladosha work in video installation, performance art, drag, and music. On occasion, the members of the House of Ladosha collaborate and work on content together. House of Ladosha create diverse content that makes one think about the content that they are looking at or listening to. Some members are inspiration for other members, while some members help each other with technical problems. Their music has been cited as a "deconstruction of hip-hop masculinity and sexuality" and Blair and Radakovich have referenced the film Paris is Burning as a major influence on their music as well as clothing.

In summer of 2007, House of Ladosha started posting music to online platforms such as MySpace, Youtube, and Soundcloud, and after gaining a following, they began performing shows around New York City. Their music incorporates heavy aspects of New York ballroom culture, with their raps specializing in fashion and sex references that uniquely explore the LGTBQ+ culture and experience. During shows, they are said to perform in a mixture of drag and androgynous attire. Some of their most popular songs include “Rollin’,” “Witches of Bushwick,” and “BMF - Black/Model/Famous.” Antonio Blair hopes to continue to build the brand and movement, while the House of Ladosha, as a collective, has since shifted into more individual visual projects.

== In popular culture ==
- Rihanna has been photographed wearing a "Cunt Life" shirt designed by the group.
- In 2017, House of Ladosha was included in the New Museum's exhibition "Trigger: Gender as a Tool and a Weapon."
- In 2022, Beyoncé mentioned the collective in her BREAK MY SOUL (THE QUEENS Remix) featuring Madonna.

== See also ==
- LGBT culture in New York City
- List of LGBT people from New York City
- NYC Pride March
