= Bryan Llenas =

American television news correspondent (born 1988)

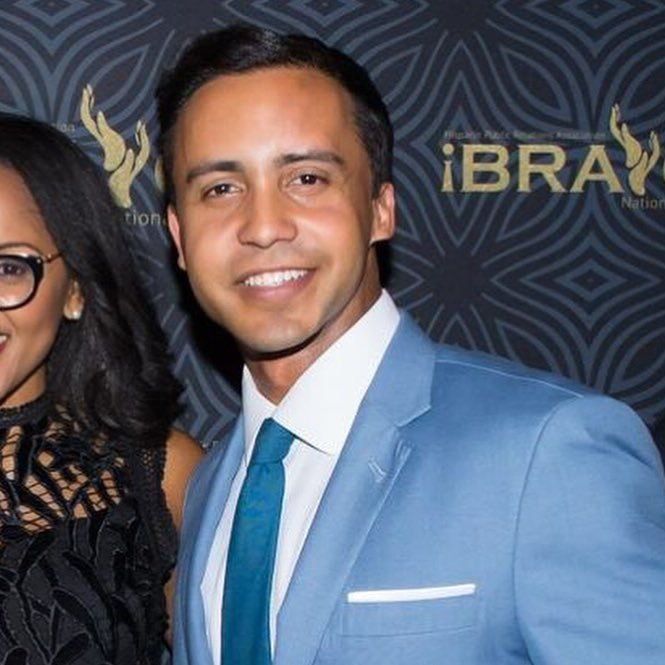
- Llenas in 2019
- Born: July 12, 1988 (age 38); Boca Raton, Florida, U.S.
- Education: University of Miami
- Occupation: National Correspondent
- Employer: Fox News

Bryan Llenas (born July 12, 1988) is an American television news correspondent on the Fox News Channel. He has covered both national and international stories, including mass shootings, terror attacks and natural disasters.

== Early life ==
Llenas is from Boca Raton, Florida. He attended the University of Miami and graduated in 2010 with a degree in broadcast journalism and political science. There he was inducted into the Iron Arrow Honor Society, the “highest honor attained at the University of Miami,” and in 2017 won the University of Miami "Communicator of the Year" Award.

== Journalism career ==
Llenas is a correspondent at Fox News. Some of his first stories covered at Fox News were the 2014 World Cup in Brazil, the inauguration of Pope Francis in Rome, and the Pope's visit to the United States.

He has reported on the trial of Mexican Drug lord Joaquin 'El Chapo' Guzman in New York, the Bill Cosby trial, the Trump administration family separation policy, the mass shooting at a church in Sutherland Springs, Texas, Hurricane Irma and Hurricane Maria in Puerto Rico, President Donald Trump's transition team, and the September 2016 terrorist bombings in both Manhattan and New Jersey.

== Personal life ==
Llenas is gay and has talked openly about working for a conservative company as a gay minority and being accepted at Fox News.

== See also ==
- LGBT culture in New York City
- List of LGBT people from New York City
- New Yorkers in journalism
