= Lila Nikole Rivera =

American costume designer

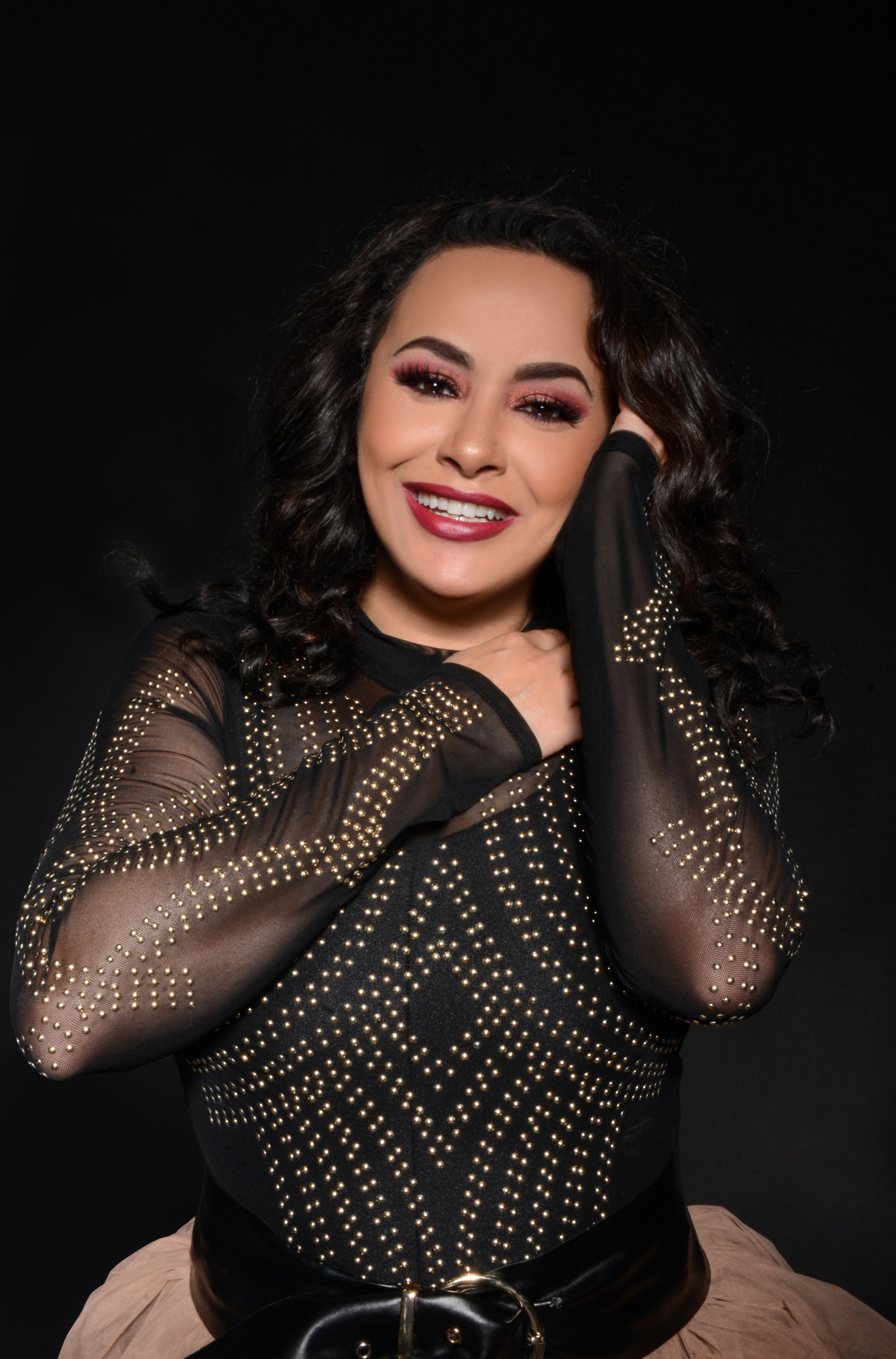
- Born: March 29, 1979 (age 47); Queens, New York, U.S.
- Other name: Lila Nikole
- Occupation: Costume designer
- Years active: 2006–present

Lila Nikole Rivera (born March 29, 1979) is an American costume designer. She is known for her eponymous brand the Lila Nikole Collection. She is the first Latin Costume designer to design all costumes and manage the wardrobe department for The Super Bowl Half Time Show featuring The Weeknd.

== Early life ==
Rivera was born in Queens, New York to Puerto Rican parents Millie and Hector Rivera. She graduated Magna Cum Laude from the Art Institute of Fort Lauderdale with Bachelors in science in the year 2005. She was nominated in the Hall of fame at the Art Institute of Fort Lauderdale as a values alumnus in the year 2007.

== Career ==
In her college days she used to design and create swimwear for fellow students which became much popular. Rivera then started her career as a professional costume designer from 2006 under the brand name, Amaya Swimwear. She changed the name to the eponymous brand, the Lila Nikole Collection, in the year 2009. The Lila Nikole Collection has been featured in New York Fashion Week, Los Angeles Fashion Week, Mercedes-Benz Fashion Week Swim Miami Swim Week, Swim Miami and Rip The Runway. Her collections have appeared in several magazine and magazine covers including Vogue, Elle, Sports Illustrated, Harper's Bazaar, Cosmopolitan, WWD, GQ etc. Rivera has also collaborated with ten National Football League and two National Basketball Association teams for designing the swimwear for the cheerleader's swimsuit calendar for the respective teams. Her designs were also displayed in The Rock & Roll Hall of Fame and The NFL Museum. On various occasions, Rivera has worked as a swimwear and costume designer for Will Smith, Kim Kardashian, Keyshia Cole, Serena Williams, Sara Underwood, Jenny McCarthy, Gigi Hadid, Patti Labelle, DJ Khalid, Cardi B, Toni Braxton, Chrissy Tiegen, Emily Ratajkowski etc. Rivera has served as the lead wardrobe stylist and costume designer for TV programs like The Grammys, Soul Train Awards, BET Awards, and Black Girls Rock show.

== Philanthropy ==
Lila Nikole founded the Project Save Imagination in 2012, which is a 501 C organization with the aim to provide financial support the students who are passionate about arts.
