= Transgender culture of New York City =

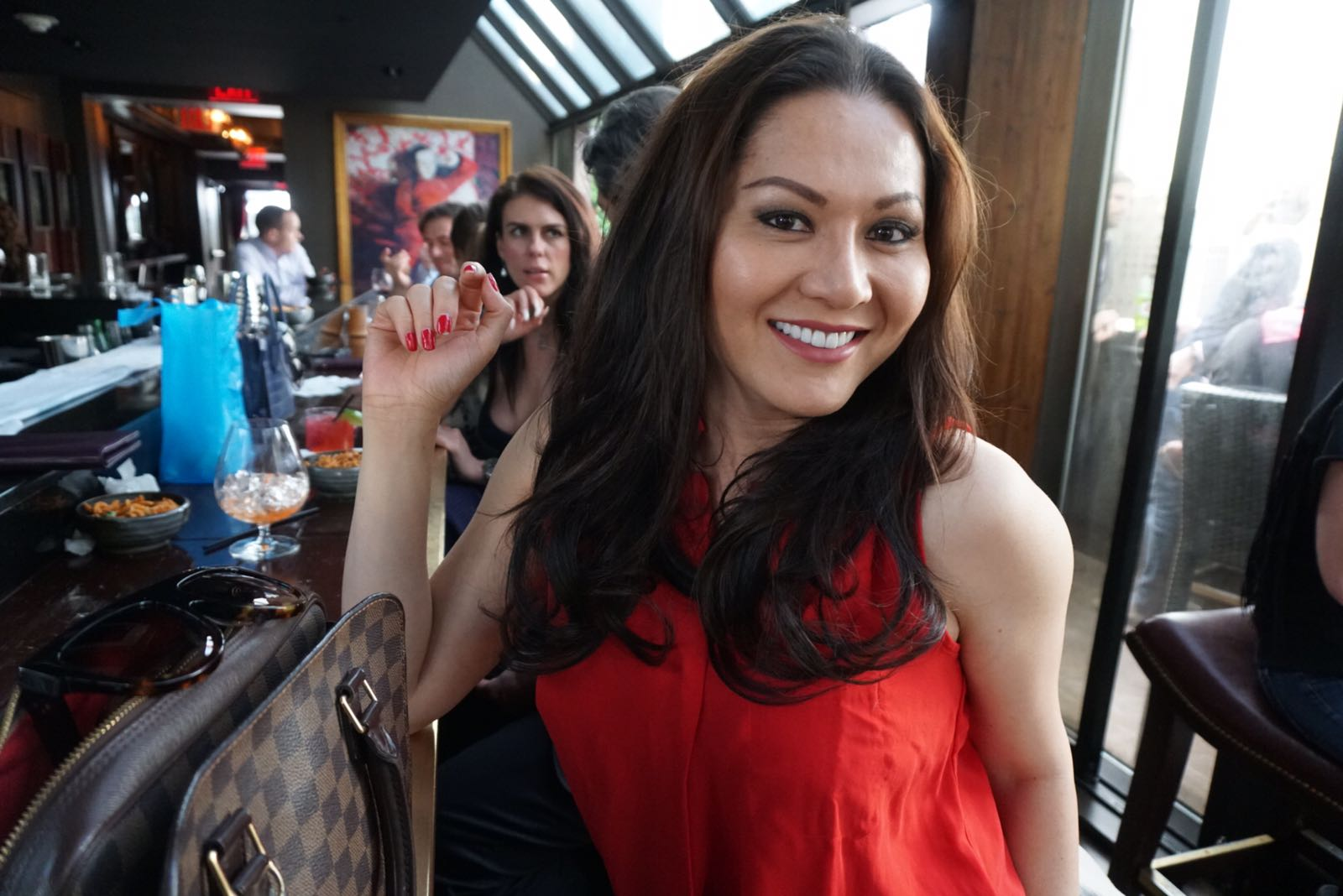
Indonesian transgender actress Solena Sulin celebrating her birthday at The Peninsula New York hotel in 2017.

New York City is home to the largest metropolitan transgender population in the world and is often called the "trans capital of the world". The transgender community was estimated at more than 70,000 in 2024, with the highest concentrations in Manhattan, Brooklyn, and Queens. The Brooklyn Liberation March, the largest transgender rights demonstration at the time, took place on June 14, 2020, in Brooklyn, focused on supporting Black transgender rights and drew an estimated 15,000 to 20,000 participants.

Despite playing a significant role in advocating for LGBTQ equality since the 1969 Stonewall riots and beyond, the transgender community in New York City has frequently been marginalized and abandoned by the city's broader gay, lesbian, bisexual, and queer communities. Since Stonewall, particularly in the 21st century, New York City's transgender community has grown in both size and prominence.

== History ==
=== 1960s and 70s ===
During the Stonewall riots, when violence erupted, the women and transmasculine people held at the New York Women's House of Detention down the street joined in by chanting, setting fire to their belongings, and tossing them onto the street below.

According to Transgender History by Susan Stryker, the Stonewall riots exerted significant effects on transgender rights activism. Sylvia Rivera and Marsha P. Johnson founded the Street Transvestite Action Revolutionaries (STAR) in response to what they saw as inadequate representation of trans people within the Gay Activists Alliance and the Gay Liberation Front. They established politicized versions of "houses," a concept originating from Black and Latino queer communities, to provide shelter for marginalized transgender youth.

In addition to STAR, other organizations such as Transvestites and Transsexuals and the Queens Liberation Front (QLF) were also formed. QLF, founded by Lee Brewster and Barbara de Lamere (formerly known as Bunny Eisenhower), participated in Christopher Street Liberation Day marches and advocated for trans visibility and against drag erasure.

=== 1990s and 2000s ===
Drawing inspiration from Johnson and Rivera's "houses", activist Rusty Mae Moore created Transy House, an informal shelter at her rowhouse in Park Slope. Transy House operated from the 1990s through the 2000s. Residents included Sylvia Rivera.

The Okra Project, founded in 2018, is a Brooklyn organization that combats food insecurity among Black trans people.

=== 2020s ===
Originally, the U.S. National Park Service website for the Stonewall National Monument had included references to transgender and queer communities. Following the signing of Executive Order 14168 by U.S. president Donald Trump in 2025, which directed federal agencies and federally funded entities to cease promotion of gender ideology, all mentions of transgender and queer individuals were removed from the website.

On the same day, The Stonewall Inn Gives Back Initiative and the Stonewall Inn issued a joint statement criticizing the removal of content, highlighting the role of trans people, particularly non-white trans women, in the Stonewall riots and the broader LGBTQ+ rights movement. The statement specifically mentioned Marsha P. Johnson, Sylvia Rivera, and other transgender and gender-nonconforming individuals as central figures in the historical events.

Efforts since successfully emerged to restore references to transgender and queer history on the Stonewall National Monument website. Meanwhile, New York State's official LGBTQ monument on the Hudson River shoreline has maintained its inclusion of transgender and queer historical narratives.

Singers, a Brooklyn bar which opened in 2022, is popular among trans patrons. The bar hosted the "Twinks vs. Dolls Olympics", a competition between queer and trans men ("twinks") and trans women ("dolls"). Contests ranged from cigarette-smoking races to wrestling matches in a kiddie pool filled with lubricant.

In 2023, dozens of trans and gender non-conforming people convened for a party on Fire Island called the "Doll Invasion". Organizer Fran Tirado expressed her intention to make Fire Island, a popular tourist destination for cisgender gay men, more welcoming to trans people. The event occurred again in 2024.

== Ball culture ==
Ball culture is an underground subculture of mostly Black and Latino LGBTQ people, originating in Harlem. Cross dressing balls have existed in the city since the 1800s; the Hamilton Lodge Ball in 1869 is the first recorded drag ball in US history.

In the 1970s, Crystal LaBeija and her friend Lottie (both Black queens) founded the House of LaBeija, the first house.

The subculture's distinctive system of gender categorization reflects the presence of transgender people. Transgender women are classified as "Femme Queens", and transgender men are generally classified as "Butch", alongside other female-assigned people with a masculine appearance. Some trans men who identify as gay men move into the "Butch Queen" (gay man) category.

Notable transgender members of the New York City ball scene include Venus Xtravaganza, a femme queen who appeared in the 1990 documentary Paris is Burning, and Angie Xtravaganza, the founder of the House of Xtravaganza.

== Notable locations ==
For decades, the Christopher Street Pier has served as an informal gathering place for transgender New Yorkers. Documentaries such as Paris is Burning (1990) and Pier Kids (2019) feature footage of the pier and interviews with transgender people who socialize there. In 2000, FIERCE formed as a community organization for LGBT youth in the surrounding waterfront area, producing a documentary that highlighted problems like frequent youth interactions with security personnel and a lack of investment in services for homeless people, which they contrasted with the city's investment in a redevelopment project.

== Notable figures ==
Notable figures of the trans community in New York City

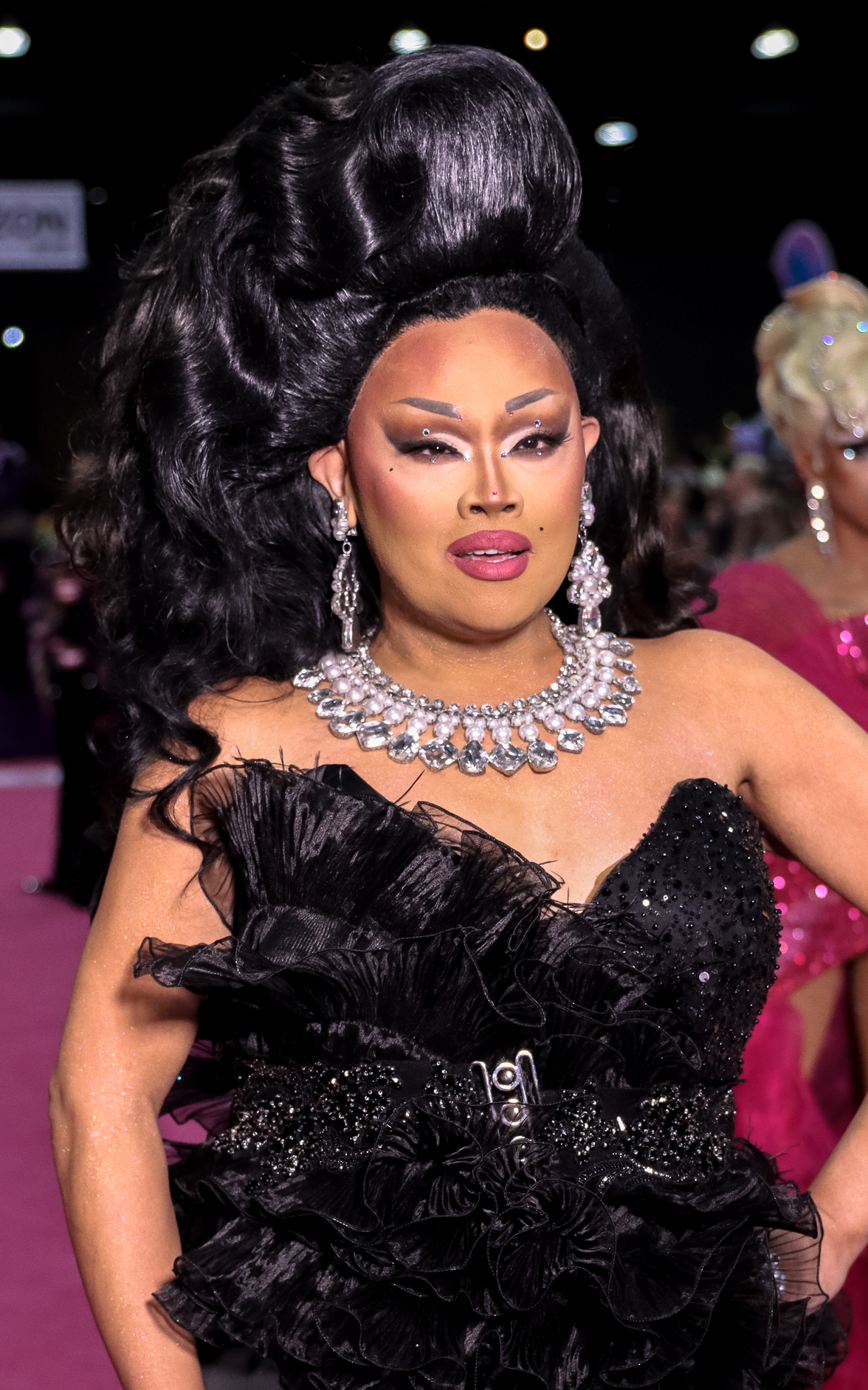
Jiggly Caliente

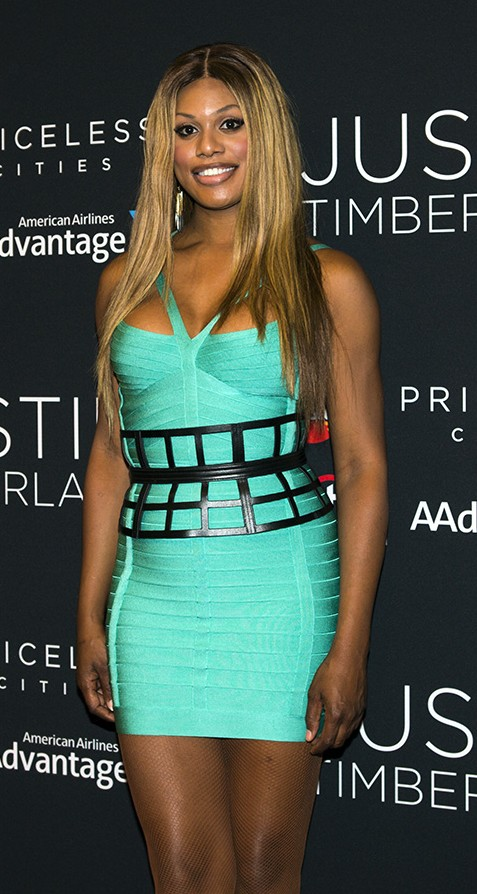
Laverne Cox

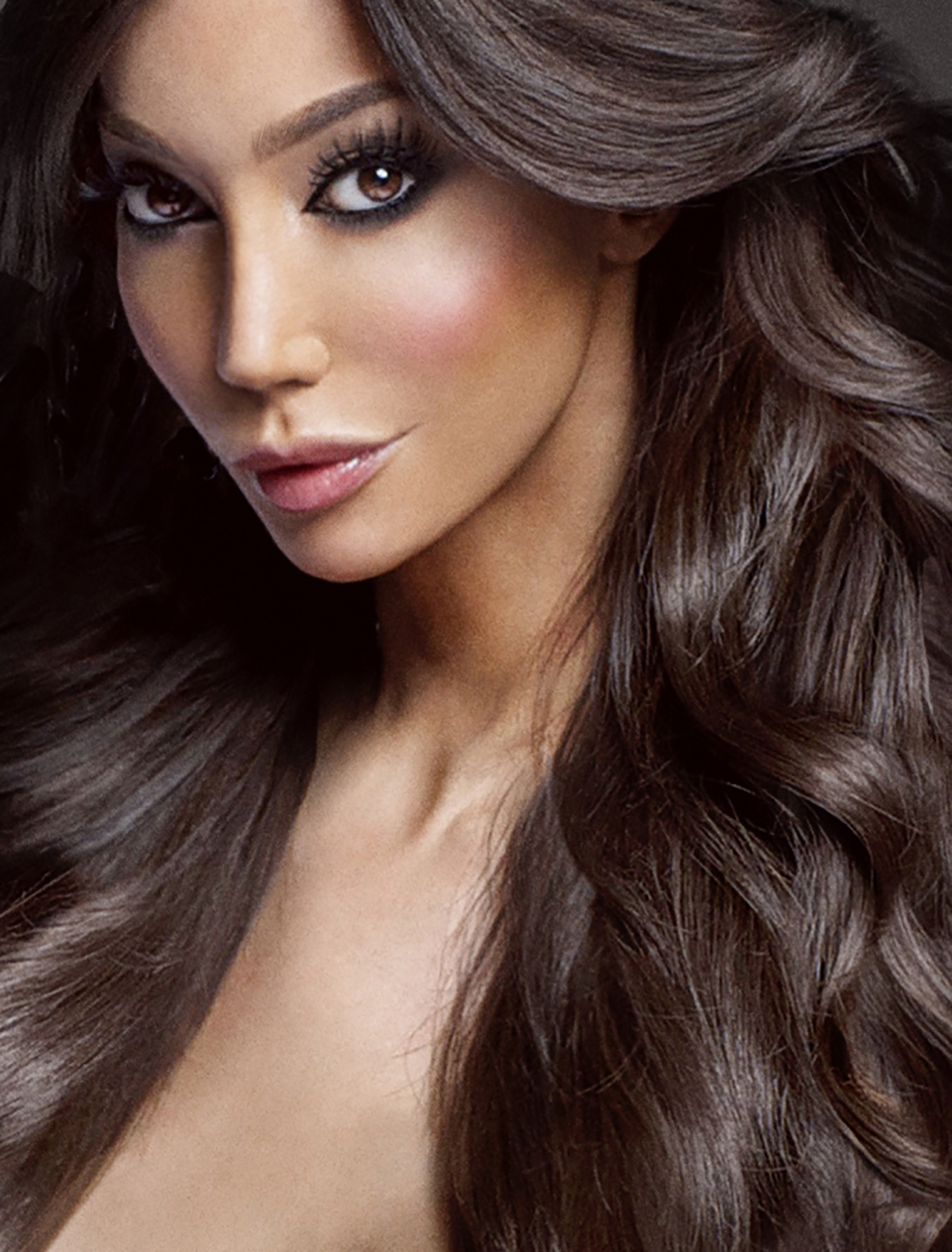
Yasmine Petty

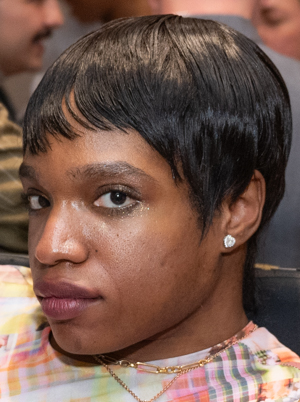
Aariana Rose Philip

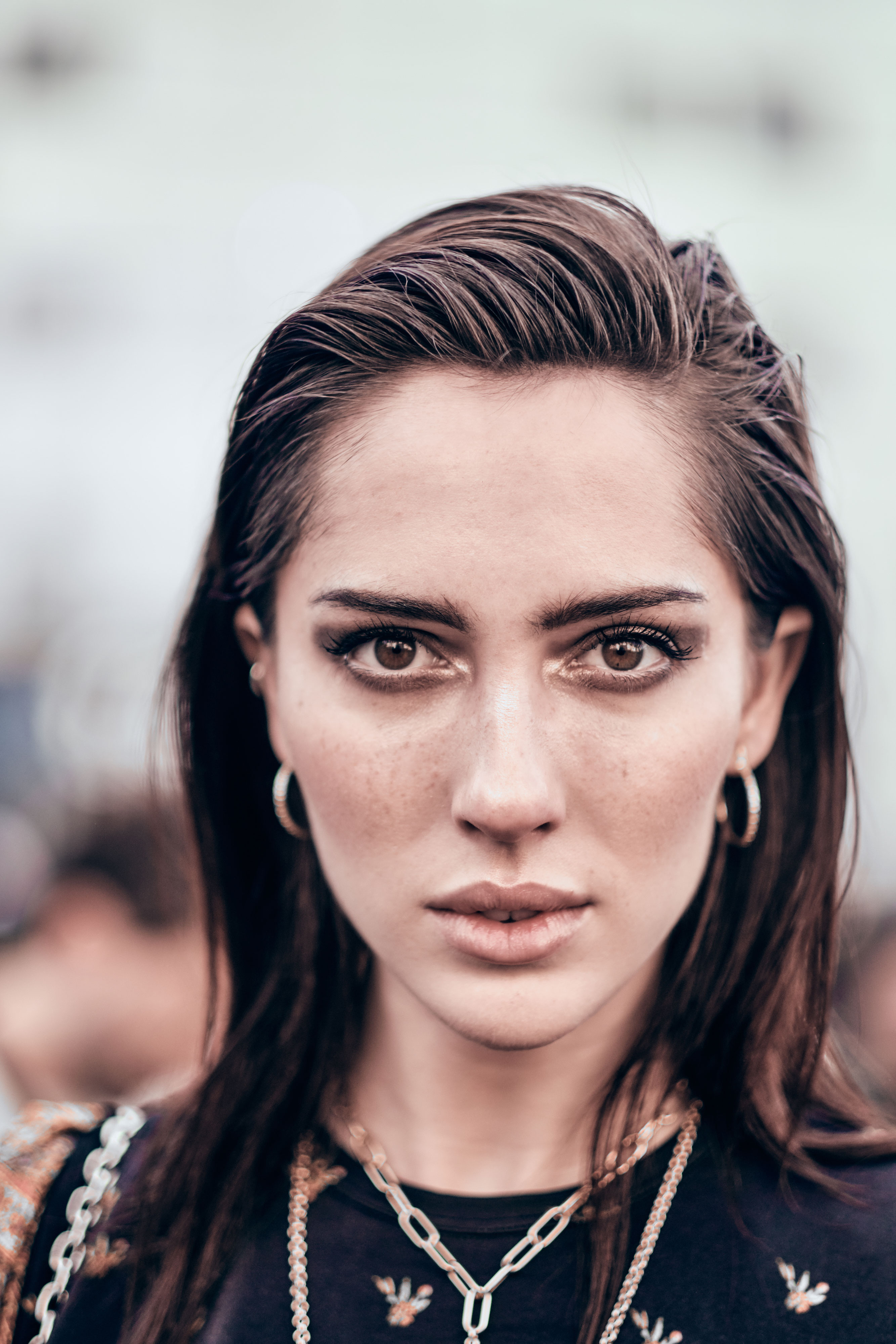
Teddy Quinlivan

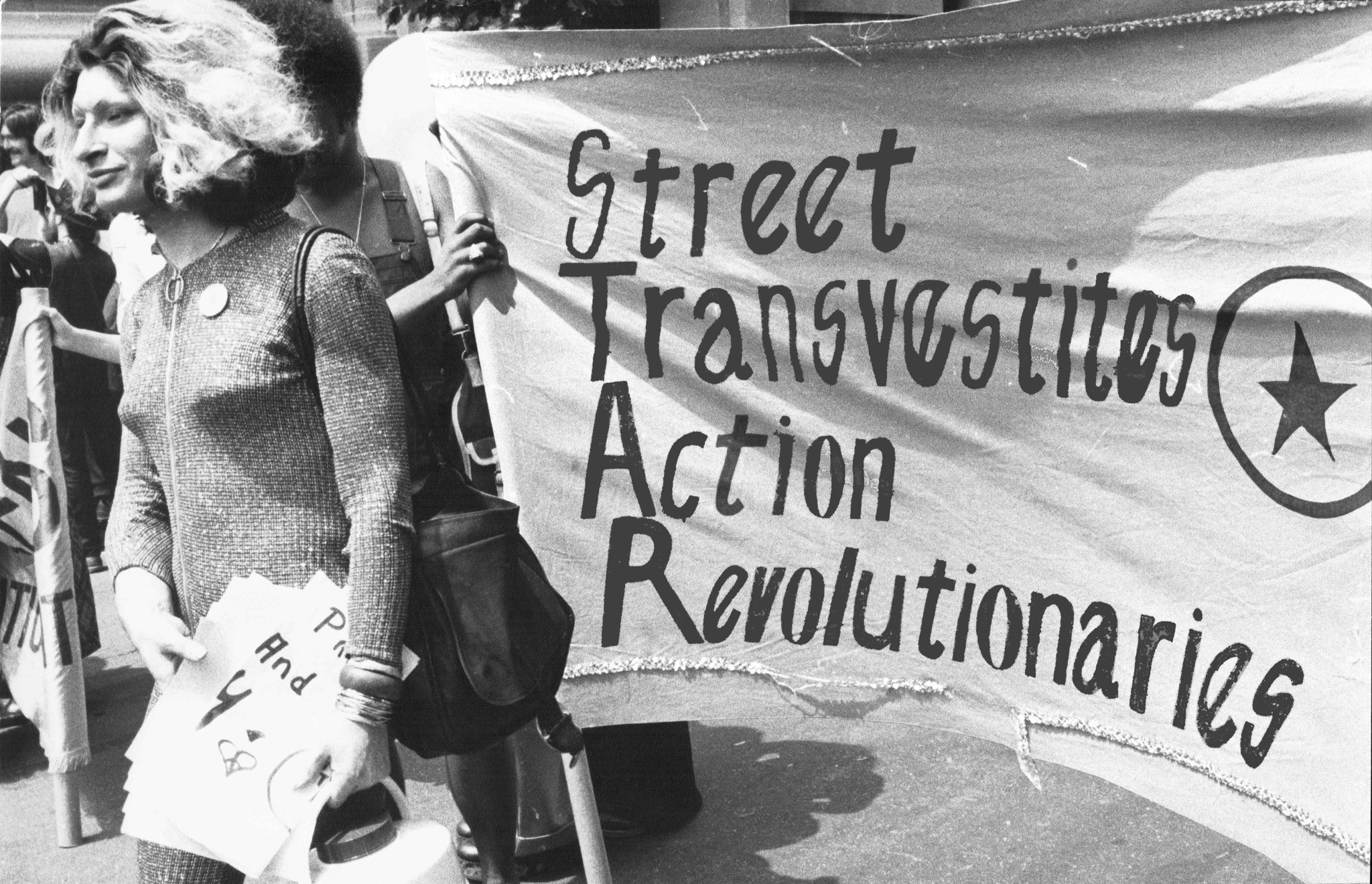
Sylvia Rivera

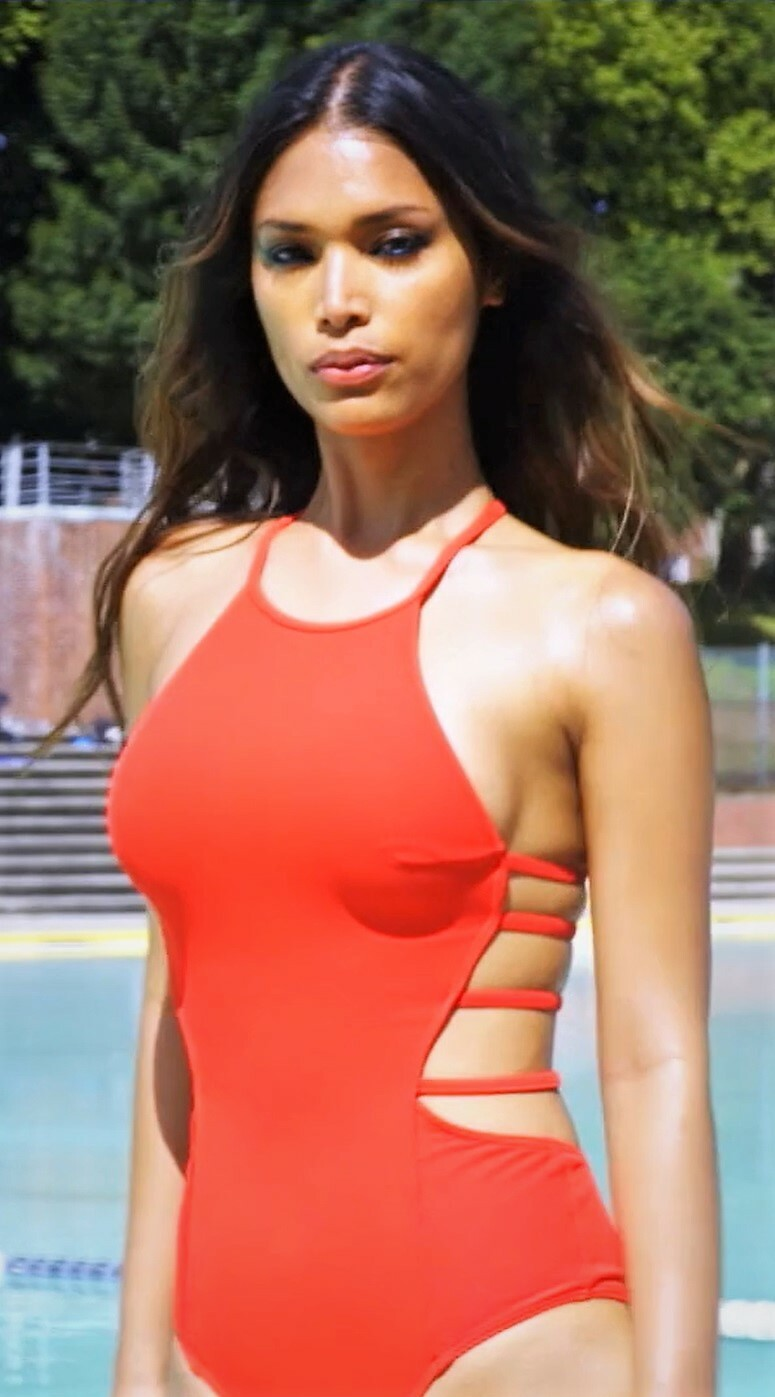
Geena Rocero

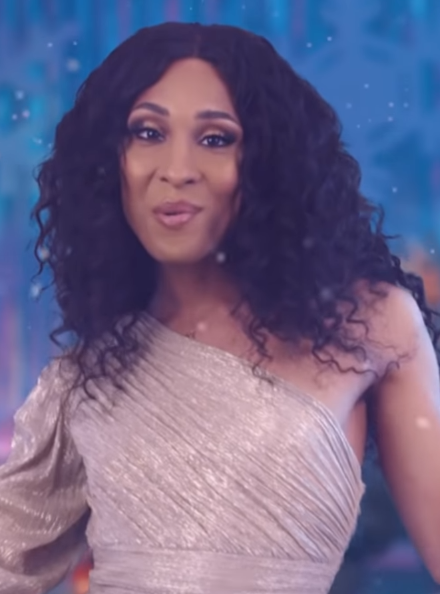
Michaela Jaé Rodriguez

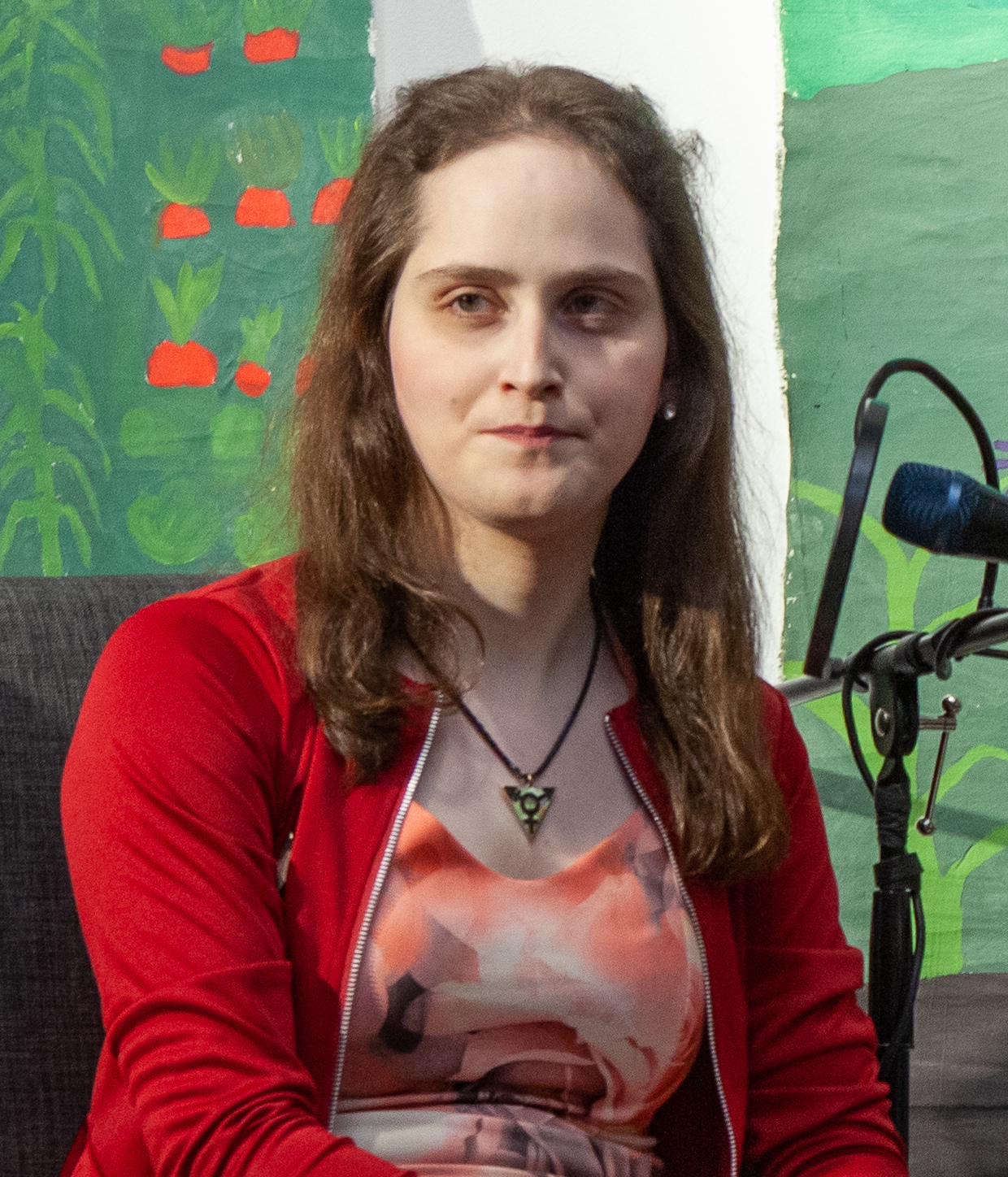
Abby Stein

== See also ==
- Drag culture in New York City
- LGBTQ culture in New York City
- List of LGBTQ people from New York City
- NYC Drag March
- NYC Pride March
