= List of LGBTQ people in New York City =

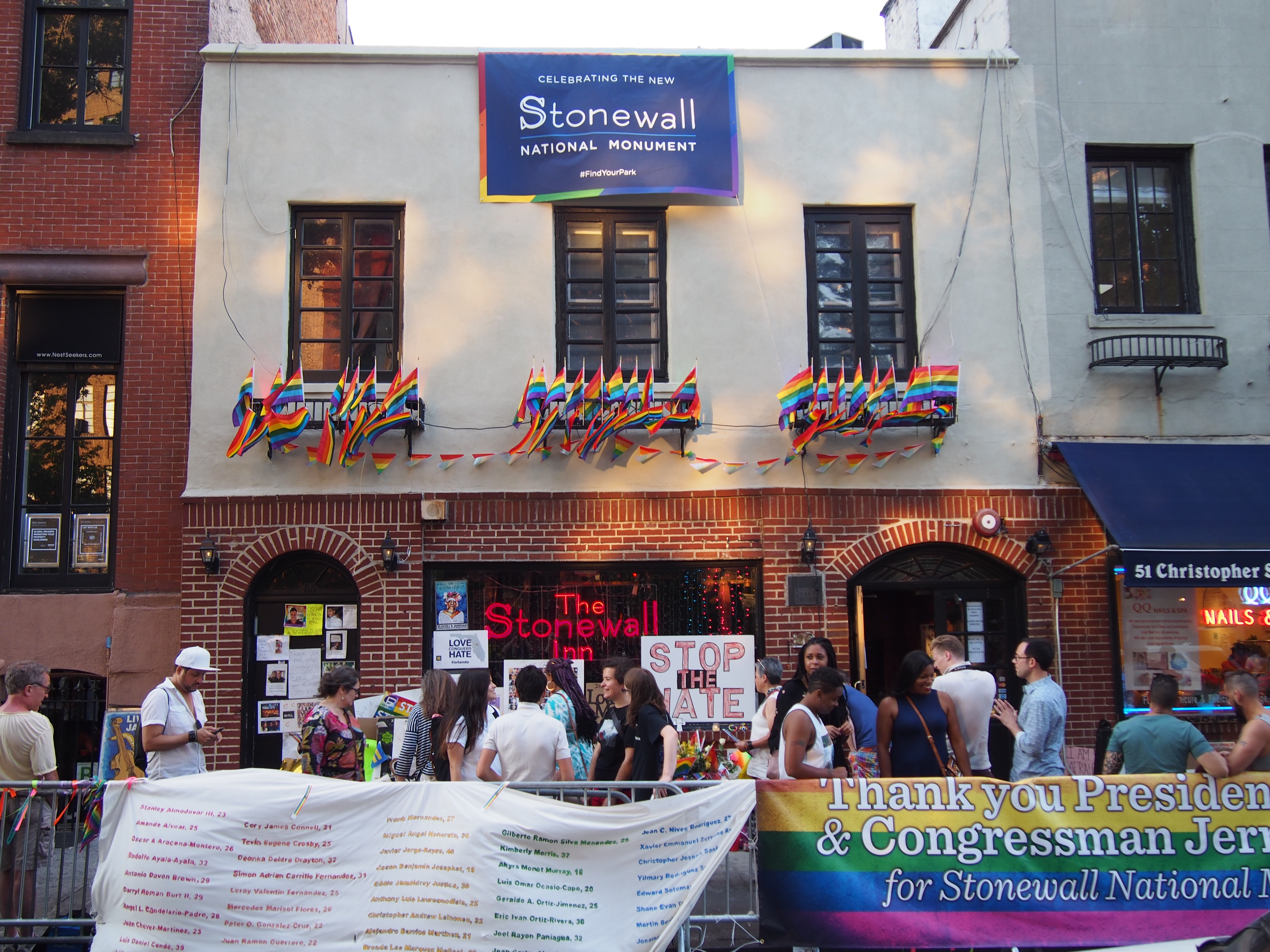
The Stonewall Inn in the gay village of Greenwich Village, Manhattan, the cradle of the modern gay rights movement

New York City has been described as the gay capital of the world and the central node of the LGBTQ sociopolitical ecosystem. It is home to the most prominent and one of the world's largest LGBTQ populations. LGBTQ Americans in New York City constitute the largest self-identifying lesbian, gay, bisexual, transgender, and queer communities by a significant margin in the United States. Greenwich Village in Lower Manhattan was the site of the 1969 Stonewall uprising, and then spawned several foundational organizations in the emerging gay liberation movement. These events are widely considered to be crucial to the founding of the modern gay rights movement in the United States, as well as having worldwide impact. As of 2005, New York City was home to an estimated 272,493 self-identifying gay and bisexual individuals. The New York metropolitan area had an estimated 568,903 self-identifying LGBTQ residents. New York City is also home to the largest transgender population in the United States, estimated at 50,000 in 2018, concentrated in Manhattan and Queens.

Brian Silverman, the author of Frommer's New York City from $90 a Day, writes that the city has "one of the world's largest, loudest, and most powerful LGBTQ communities", and "Gay and lesbian culture is as much a part of New York's basic identity as yellow cabs, high-rises, and Broadway theatre". LGBTQ travel guide Queer in the World states, "The fabulosity of Gay New York is unrivaled on Earth, and queer culture seeps into every corner of its five boroughs". In 2022, LGBTQ advocate and entertainer Madonna stated metaphorically, "Anyways, not only is New York City the best place in the world because of the queer people here. Let me tell you something, if you can make it here, then you must be queer". Comedian Jerrod Carmichael joked, "That's actually why I live here... if you say you're gay in New York, you can ride the bus for free and they just give you free pizza; if you say you're gay in New York, you get to host Saturday Night Live. This is the gayest thing you can possibly do. We're basically in an Andy Warhol fever dream right now." In 2022, New York City Mayor Eric Adams announced a billboard campaign to woo Floridians to a significantly more supportive environment for LGBTQ residents in New York.

The following represents a partial list of notable LGBTQ New Yorkers:

== List of LGBTQ New Yorkers ==
=== Academia and research ===
- Andrew Dolkart – co-founder, NYC LGBT Historic Sites Project; professor, historic preservation, Columbia Graduate School of Architecture, Planning and Preservation (GSAPP)
- Kevin Nadal – professor of psychology and researcher at John Jay College of Criminal Justice and The Graduate Center of the City University of New York

=== Architecture ===
- Charles Renfro – architect, partner at Diller Scofidio + Renfro, faculty member at School of Visual Arts

=== Aviation and military ===
- Robina Asti – late Navy pilot who ran reconnaissance missions out of Midway Island in World War II; born in Queens and longtime Manhattan resident; transitioned post-war, and remained a pilot her whole life; Guinness world record holder for oldest active flight instructor in 2020, when she was 99

=== Dance ===
- Bill T. Jones – dancer and choreographer
- Shen Wei – choreographer, artist, and director

=== Entrepreneurship and technology ===
- Bradford Shellhammer – entrepreneur and designer, founding editor of Queerty
- Joel Spolsky – software engineer

=== Fashion ===
==== Design ====
- Andrew Bolton – fashion curator for the Costume Institute wing of the Metropolitan Museum of Art
- Thom Browne – fashion designer
- Drew Elliott – creative director and consultant
- Prabal Gurung – fashion designer
- Marc Jacobs – fashion designer
- Calvin Klein – fashion designer
- Michael Kors – fashion designer
- Derek Lam – fashion designer
- Humberto Leon – fashion designer
- Phillip Lim – fashion designer
- Isaac Mizrahi – fashion designer
- Todd Oldham – fashion designer
- Zac Posen – fashion designer
- Christian Siriano – fashion designer
- Alexander Wang – fashion designer
- Jason Wu – fashion designer

==== Modeling ====
- J. Alexander – model and fashion designer
- Leyna Bloom – fashion model and transgender activist
- Cara Delevingne – supermodel and actress
- Peche Di – transgender model; started the first transgender modeling agency in the U.S., in New York City
- Dilone – model
- Rain Dove – model and activist
- Shay Neary – transgender model, first transgender plus-size model featured in a major fashion campaign
- Yasmine Petty – transgender model
- Aariana Rose Philip – transgender model
- Teddy Quinlivan – transgender model
- Miriam Rivera – late transgender model and first openly trans reality television star
- Geena Rocero – supermodel and transgender activist
- Abby Stein – transgender model and rabbi

=== Film and television ===
- Desiree Akhavan – film director, producer, and screenwriter
- Ted Allen – television personality and author
- Casper Andreas – director, writer, and actor
- Brian Balthazar – co-executive producer, The View
- Sandra Bernhard – actress, singer, and author
- Matt Bomer – actor and director
- Joel Kim Booster – actor, comedian, producer, and writer
- Jerrod Carmichael – actor, comedian, and filmmaker
- Candis Cayne – transgender actress
- Bill Condon – director, screenwriter, and producer
- Laverne Cox – transgender actress
- Lee Daniels – director, screenwriter, and producer
- Casey Donovan – late gay pornography actor
- Fredrik Eklund – real estate broker, co-star of Million Dollar Listing New York
- Rodney Evans – director and screenwriter
- Tim Gunn – fashion consultant, television personality and actor
- Dominique Jackson – transgender actress and model
- Punkie Johnson – actress, comedian, writer, Saturday Night Live
- Jari Jones – transgender filmmaker and producer
- Michael Patrick King – director, writer, and producer
- Carson Kressley – television personality, former host of Queer Eye for the Straight Guy
- John Krokidas – director, writer, and producer
- James Charles - influencer
- Jennie Livingston – documentary filmmaker
- Chella Man – artist, actor, and transgender model
- Rob Marshall – director, choreographer and producer
- Kate McKinnon – comedian, actor
- John Cameron Mitchell – director, writer, and actor
- Janet Mock – TV host, writer, and transgender rights activist
- Indya Moore – transgender actor and model
- Lauren Morelli – screenwriter
- Cynthia Nixon – actress
- Wolé Parks – actor
- Stacie Passon – director, screenwriter, and producer
- Sarah Paulson – actress
- Kal Penn – actor
- Patrik-Ian Polk – director, screenwriter, and producer
- Antoni Porowski – television personality, cook, actor, model, and author
- Zachary Quinto – actor and producer
- Dee Rees – director, screenwriter, and producer
- Erik Rhodes (James Elliott Naughtin) – late gay pornography actor, amateur bodybuilder
- Yoruba Richen – documentary filmmaker
- Michaela Jaé Rodriguez – transgender actress
- Harmony Santana – transgender actress
- Greta Schiller – documentary filmmaker
- Jonathan Van Ness – non-binary television personality
- Rutina Wesley – actress
- Samira Wiley – actress and model
- Bowen Yang – writer and actor, Saturday Night Live

=== Law ===
- Roy Cohn – late closeted lawyer who prosecuted those accused of being homosexuals and communists during the Lavender scare and Second Red Scare
- Paul Feinman – first openly gay judge confirmed to the New York State Court of Appeals, in June 2017

=== Literature ===
- Hilton Als – writer and theater critic
- Ellis Avery – late author
- James Baldwin – late novelist, playwright, essayist, poet, and activist
- James Beard – late culinary author and chef
- Bruce Benderson – author
- Jennifer Finney Boylan – trans author and journalist
- Augusten Burroughs – author, memoirist
- Regie Cabico – poet and spoken-word artist
- Michael Cunningham – author
- Samuel R. Delany – author
- Nicole Dennis-Benn – author
- Thomas M. Disch – late author
- Mark Doty – poet and memoirist
- Martin Duberman – biographer and historian
- Cyrus Grace Dunham – author
- David Ebershoff – author and editor
- Allen Ginsberg – late poet, philosopher, and writer
- Paul Lisicky – author and memoirist
- Jaime Manrique – poet, essayist, and translator
- Eric Marcus – author
- Lesléa Newman – author and editor
- Frank O'Hara – late New York School poet
- Rakesh Satyal – author
- Ariel Schrag – cartoonist and television writer
- Sarah Schulman – author
- Charles Silverstein – author, therapist, and gay activist
- Susan Sontag – late writer, filmmaker, philosopher, teacher, and political activist
- Colm Tóibín – author, journalist, critic
- Edmund White – author, critic, and memoirist

=== Media ===
- Jack Anderson – late dance critic and author
- Rose Arce – journalist and producer
- Michael Ausiello – journalist, multiple media platforms
- Josh Barro – journalist and senior editor, Business Insider
- Keith Boykin – syndicated columnist
- Ben Brantley – journalist and chief theater critic, The New York Times
- Kristen Browde – journalist, formerly of NBC 4 News and CBS News, and attorney
- Frank Bruni – journalist and op-ed columnist, The New York Times
- Sam Champion – meteorologist and television weather anchor
- Sewell Chan – senior fellow at the Annenberg Center on Communication Leadership & Policy
- Andy Cohen – television personality
- Anderson Cooper – journalist and television anchor, CNN
- Angela Dimayuga – food critic for The New York Times, chef
- George Dorris – editor and writer
- David W. Dunlap – journalist, The New York Times
- Ronan Farrow – journalist and lawyer
- Stephanie Gosk – journalist, NBC News
- Mark Harris – journalist, multiple media platforms
- Perez Hilton – blogger
- Charles Kaiser – journalist and author
- Sally Kohn – journalist, political commentator
- Steve Kornacki – writer and political correspondent with NBC News
- Don Lemon – journalist and television anchor, CNN
- Bryan Llenas – journalist, Fox News
- Michael Lucas – journalist, The Advocate and HuffPost; director, businessman, actor, and activist
- Rachel Maddow – journalist and television anchor, MSNBC
- Stephen Morgan – meteorologist, Fox Weather
- Adam Moss – writer and editor, New York magazine
- Michael Musto – journalist
- Rosie O'Donnell – television personality
- Richard Quest – journalist, CNN International
- Robin Roberts – journalist and television anchor, Good Morning America
- Thomas Roberts – TV journalist and news anchor
- Steven Romo – anchor, NBC News, MSNBC
- Nate Silver – writer, statistician, and founder/editor of FiveThirtyEight
- Shepard Smith – journalist and anchor, formerly of FOX News and CNBC
- André Leon Talley – late fashion journalist, Vogue
- Andy Towle – blogger, political commentator, and founder of Towleroad
- Jann Wenner – co-founder and publisher, Rolling Stone
- Jenna Wolfe – journalist and TV news host

=== Music ===
- Adult Mom – singer and songwriter
- Michael Alig – late musician, club promoter, convicted murderer
- Mykki Blanco – transgender rapper, performance artist, poet, and activist
- Mal Blum – singer and songwriter
- Dai Burger – rapper
- Cakes da Killa – rapper
- Cazwell – rapper
- Jayne County – glam-rock musician
- Angel Haze – rapper and songwriter
- House of Ladosha – rap duo (Antonio Blair and Adam Radakovich) and artistic collective
- Dev Hynes – musician
- DJ Keoki – electronic musician
- Lady Gaga – singer and songwriter
- Le1f – rapper and producer
- Larry Levan – late, pioneering house DJ and producer
- Stephin Merritt – musician and songwriter with The Magnetic Fields, writer of the music and lyrics of Coraline
- Jonte' Moaning – singer, songwriter, dancer, and choreographer
- Princess Nokia – rapper and musician
- Lou Reed – late musician
- Moi Renée – late singer and performer, known for the house music single "Miss Honey" (1992)
- Arthur Russell – late avant-garde musician
- Jake Shears – singer and songwriter
- Will Sheridan – singer and musician
- St. Vincent – singer-songwriter, musician
- Sufjan Stevens – singer and songwriter
- Brad Walsh – singer and music producer

=== Nightlife ===
==== Ballroom ====
- Erickatoure Aviance – ballroom performer (House of Aviance)
- Kevin Aviance – drag queen, musician, and performance artist (House of Aviance)
- Mother Juan Aviance – ballroom performer (founder of the House of Aviance)
- Crystal LaBeija – late drag queen (founder of the House of LaBeija)
- Pepper LaBeija – late drag queen and fashion designer (House of LaBeija)
- Leiomy Maldonado – transgender ballroom performer (House of Amazon)
- Willi Ninja – late ballroom performer known as "the godfather of voguing" (founder of the House of Ninja)
- Hector Xtravaganza – late dancer, choreographer, and voguer (House of Xtravaganza)
- Venus Xtravaganza – late transgender performer and voguer (House of Xtravaganza)

==== Drag ====
- Acid Betty – drag queen (contestant on the eighth season of RuPaul's Drag Race and tenth season of RuPaul's Drag Race All Stars
- Aja – drag queen (contestant on the ninth season of RuPaul's Drag Race, the third Season of RuPaul's Drag Race All Stars and the tenth season of RuPaul's Drag Race All Stars) and rapper
- Alexis Michelle – singer and drag queen (contestant on the ninth season of RuPaul's Drag Race and the eighth season of RuPaul's Drag Race All Stars)
- Amanda Tori Meating – drag performer, and actor (contestant on the sixteenth season of RuPaul's Drag Race)
- Aquaria – drag queen and performance artist (winner of the tenth season of RuPaul's Drag Race)
- Joey Arias – drag queen and performance artist
- Kevin Aviance – drag queen
- Bianca Del Rio – drag queen
- Blair St. Clair – drag queen and singer (contestant on the tenth season of RuPaul's Drag Race and the fifth season of RuPaul's Drag Race All Stars)
- Bob the Drag Queen – drag queen; performance artist (winner of the eighth season of RuPaul's Drag Race; host of We're Here and contestant on the third season of The Traitors; author
- Lee Brewster – late drag queen, homophile, transvestite activist, founder of Queens Liberation Front
- Brita Filter – drag queen (contestant on the twelfth season of RuPaul's Drag Race), actor, and star of Shade: Queens of NYC
- Dallas DuBois – former drag queen
- Dawn – drag performer (contestant on the sixteenth season of RuPaul's Drag Race)
- Dusty Ray Bottoms – drag performer (contestant on the tenth season of RuPaul's Drag Race)
- Erickatoure Aviance – drag queen and member of the House of Aviance
- Hedda Lettuce – drag queen and singer
- Honey Davenport – activist, singer, and drag queen (contestant on the eleventh season of RuPaul's Drag Race)
- Ivy Winters – drag performer, sing, and actor (contestant and Miss Congeniality of the fifth season of RuPaul's Drag Race)
- Jackie Cox – drag queen (contestant on the twelfth season of RuPaul's Drag Race)
- Jan Sport – drag queen (contestant on the twelfth season of RuPaul's Drag Race and the sixth season of RuPaul's Drag Race All Stars)
- Jasmine Kennedie – drag queen (contestant on the fourteenth season of RuPaul's Drag Race)
- Jax – drag queen and dancer (contestant on the fifteenth season of RuPaul's Drag Race)
- Jiggly Caliente – late transgender singer, actress, activist, and drag queen (contestant on the fourth season of RuPaul's Drag Race and the sixth season RuPaul's Drag Race All Stars and judge of Drag Race Philippines)
- Kandy Muse – drag queen, contestant on the thirteenth season of RuPaul's Drag Race and eighth season of RuPaul's Drag Race All Stars
- Lady Bunny – drag queen and founder of Wigstock event
- Lagoona Bloo – drag queen and singer
- Lana Ja'Rae – drag performer (contestant on the seventeenth season of RuPaul's Drag Race)
- Lemon – drag queen (contestant on the first season of Canada's Drag Race the first series of RuPaul's Drag Race: UK vs. the World and winner of second season of Canada's Drag Race: Canada vs. the World)
- Lypsinka – drag queen, writer, musician, and performance artist
- Manila Luzon – drag queen (contestant on the third season of RuPaul's Drag Race the first season, the fourth season of RuPaul's Drag Race All Starsand the host and judge of Drag Den)
- Marcia Marcia Marcia – drag performer (contestant on the fifteenth season of RuPaul's Drag Race)
- Megami – drag queen and cosplayer (contestant on the sixteenth season RuPaul's Drag Race)
- Milan – drag queen (contestant on the fourth season of RuPaul's Drag Race)
- Milk – drag performer (contestant on the sixth season of RuPaul's Drag Race and the third season of RuPaul's Drag Race All Stars) and fashion model
- Mimi Imfurst – drag performer (contestant on the third season of RuPaul's Drag Race and first season of RuPaul's Drag Race All Stars)
- Miss Fame – drag queen (contestant on the seventh season of RuPaul's Drag Race)
- Miz Cracker – drag queen (contestant on the tenth season of RuPaul's Drag Race and the fifth season of RuPaul's Drag Race All Stars)
- Monét X Change – drag queen (contestant and Miss Congenialty of the tenth season of RuPaul's Drag Race and winner of the fourth season of RuPaul's Drag Race All Stars and the seventh season of RuPaul's Drag Race All Stars)
- Murray Hill – drag king and performance artist
- Nicky Doll – drag queen (contestant on the twelfth season of RuPaul's Drag Race and host of Drag Race France)
- Nymphia Wind – drag queen (winner of the sixteenth season of RuPaul's Drag Race)
- Olivia Lux – drag performer (contestant on the thirteenth season of RuPaul's Drag Race and the tenth season of RuPaul's Drag Race All Stars)
- Paige Turner – drag performer and star of Shade: Queens of NYC
- Pearl – drag queen (contestant on the seventh season of RuPaul's Drag Race)
- Peppermint – drag queen (contestant on the ninth season of RuPaul's Drag Race) star of Head Over Heels judge of Call Me Mother and contestant on the second season of The Traitors (American TV series)
- Phi Phi O'Hara – former drag queen (contestant on the fourth season of RuPaul's Drag Race and the second season of RuPaul's Drag Race All Stars)
- Plasma – drag performer (contestant on the sixteenth season of RuPaul's Drag Race)
- Rosé – drag queen, contestant on the thirteenth season of RuPaul's Drag Race
- RuPaul – drag queen and star of the RuPaul's Drag Race series
- Sahara Davenport – late singer and drag queen (contestant on the second season of RuPaul's Drag Race)
- Sasha Velour – drag performer (winner of the ninth season of RuPaul's Drag Race and host of We're Here)
- Scarlet Envy – drag queen (contestant on the eleventh season of RuPaul's Drag Race the sixth season of RuPaul's Drag Race All Stars and the series 2 of RuPaul's Drag Race: UK vs. the World)
- Shequida – drag artist, writer, and opera singer
- Sherry Pie – drag performer (contestant on the twelfth season of RuPaul's Drag Race)
- Sherry Vine – drag queen and musician
- Shuga Cain – drag queen (contestant on the eleventh season of RuPaul's Drag Race)
- Suzie Toot – drag performer (contestant on the seventeenth season of RuPaul's Drag Race)
- Thorgy Thor – drag queen (contestant on the eighth season of RuPaul's Drag Race and the third season of RuPaul's Drag Race All Stars)
- Tina Burner – drag queen (contestant on the thirteenth season of RuPaul's Drag Race, and the tenth season of RuPaul's Drag Race All Stars and star of Shade: Queens of NYC)
- Vivacious – drag queen (contestant on the sixth season of RuPaul's Drag Race)
- Vivienne Pinay – drag performer (contestant on the fifth season of RuPaul's Drag Race)
- Xunami Muse – drag performer (contestant and Miss Congeniality on the sixteenth season of RuPaul's Drag Race)
- Yuhua Hamasaki – drag queen (contestant on the tenth season of RuPaul's Drag Race, and on Drag Race Philippines: Slaysian Royale)

==== Other ====
- Juliana Huxtable – transgender performer, artist, and writer
- Amanda Lepore – transgender performance artist
- Klaus Nomi – late countertenor and nightlife performance artist

=== Politics ===
- Erik Bottcher – member of the New York City Council (2022–present)
- Tiffany Caban – elected to the New York City Council representing western Queens (2022–present)
- David Carr – first openly gay Republican member of the New York City Council (2021-present) and Council Minority Leader (2026-present)
- Daniel Dromm – member of the New York City Council (2010–2022)
- Thomas Duane – first openly gay member of the New York State Senate, 1999–2012; former New York City Council member (1991–1999)
- Sarah Kate Ellis – CEO, GLAAD
- Deborah J. Glick – member of the New York State Assembly, the 66th Assembly District in Manhattan (1991–present)
- Brad Hoylman-Sigal – current Manhattan borough president and former Democratic senator for the New York State Senate from Manhattan's 27th district
- Crystal Hudson – elected to the New York City Council, representing Brooklyn (2022–present)
- Corey Johnson – speaker of the New York City Council (2018–2022) and member of the NYC Council (2014–2022)
- Kristin Richardson Jordan – elected to the New York City Council, representing northern Manhattan (2022–present)
- Ed Koch – late mayor of New York City, 1978–1989
- Margarita López – first openly lesbian and female Puerto Rican elected to the New York City Council, 1998–2006
- Carlos Menchaca – member of the New York City Council (2014–2022); first Mexican-American elected to a statewide New York political office
- Rosie Méndez – member of the New York City Council (January 2006– January 2018)
- Daniel J. O'Donnell – first openly gay man elected as a member of the New York State Assembly (2002–present), the 69th district in Manhattan
- Chi Ossé – youngest ever member of the New York City Council to be elected, in 2021, at age 23
- Antonio Pagán – first openly gay male and Puerto Rican elected to the New York City Council, 1994–1998; former New York City commissioner of Small Businesses (1998–2002)
- Christine Quinn – first female and first openly lesbian or gay speaker of the New York City Council (2006–2014) and member of NYC Council (1999–2014)
- Phil Reed – first openly gay male and African-American elected to the New York City Council (1998–2006)
- George Santos – U.S. congressman from New York's 3rd district (2023–2023)
- Tony Simone – member of the New York State Assembly, the 75th Assembly District in Manhattan (2023–present)
- Matthew Titone – elected Richmond County Surrogate Court judge of Staten Island in 2018 and member of the New York State Assembly (2006–2018) from the 61st District, on Staten Island
- Ritchie Torres – U.S. congressman from New York's 15th district (2019–present); city councilor (2014–2019)
- James Vacca – former member of the New York City Council
- Jimmy Van Bramer – majority leader of the New York City Council
- Randi Weingarten – president, American Federation of Teachers

=== Social activism ===
- Stormé DeLarverie – drag king, M.C., security worker, believed by many to have instigated the Stonewall uprising
- Desmond is Amazing – LGBTQ rights activist
- Brian Ellner – LGBTQ rights activist and executive vice president for public affairs at Edelman
- Marsha P. Johnson – late gay liberation activist, Stonewall combatant, member of the Gay Liberation Front (GLF), co-founder of Street Transvestite Action Revolutionaries (STAR)
- Rose Montoya – transgender activist
- Sylvia Rivera – late gay liberation and trans activist, participant in GLF actions, co-founder of Street Transvestite Action Revolutionaries
- Craig Rodwell – LGBT activist
- Kiara St. James - Transgender activist, co-founder of New York Transgender Advocacy Group

=== Sports ===
- Brian Anderson – skateboarder
- Travis Shumake – NHRA Top Fuel drag racer; first openly gay driver in the top level of any global touring motorsports league

=== Theatre ===
- Edward Albee – late playwright
- Michael Arden – director, actor, and singer
- Jon Robin Baitz – playwright, screenwriter, and producer
- Anne Bogart – director
- David Burtka – Broadway and television actor, chef
- Charlie Carver – Broadway and television actor
- Jenn Colella – actress
- Roberta Colindrez – actress and writer
- Gavin Creel – late actor and singer
- Quentin Crisp – late stage actor, raconteur, and writer
- Mart Crowley – late playwright
- Jim David – comedian, actor, playwright
- Robin de Jesús – actor
- Harvey Fierstein – actor, playwright, and screenwriter
- Jason Forbach – actor, singer, playwright and filmmaker
- Richard Greenberg – playwright and screenwriter
- Jonathan Groff – Broadway and television actor, co-star, Glee
- Jeremy O. Harris – actor and playwright
- Neil Patrick Harris – Broadway and television actor, producer, singer, comedian, magician, and television host
- Brian Hutchison – actor
- Cheyenne Jackson – actor and singer
- Larry Kramer – late playwright, author, producer, and LGBT rights advocate
- Tony Kushner – playwright and screenwriter
- Matteo Lane – comedian
- Nathan Lane – actor and comedian
- Joe Langworth – performer, director and choreographer
- Joe Mantello – director and actor
- Michael Mayer – Broadway theatre director
- Keith McDermott – actor, director and memoirist
- Terrence McNally – late playwright
- Danny McWilliams – actor and comedian
- Andy Mientus – actor, Broadway musicals
- Dylan Mulvaney – transgender actress and comedienne
- Javier Muñoz – actor, singer, and HIV/AIDS activist
- Rory O'Malley – actor and singer
- Lee Pace – actor
- Jim Parsons – Broadway and television actor, co-star, The Big Bang Theory
- Anthony Perkins – late Broadway and film actor
- Billy Porter – actor and singer
- Conrad Ricamora – multiple-award-winning Broadway and screen actor
- Ben Levi Ross – actor
- Jordan Roth – majority owner, Jujamcyn Theaters on Broadway
- Michael Rupert – actor, singer, composer, and director
- Wesley Taylor – actor and writer
- Taylor Trensch – actor
- Tuc Watkins – stage and screen actor
- BD Wong – actor

=== Visual arts ===
- Cass Bird – photographer and artist
- Andrew Bolton – head curator, the Metropolitan Museum of Art's Costume Institute
- Nancy Brooks Brody – founding member of fierce pussy, a lesbian feminist art collective
- Paul Cadmus – late artist, magical realist
- Joy Episalla – founding member of fierce pussy, visual artist
- Anthony Goicolea – artist chosen in 2017 to design the official New York State LGBT monument
- Keith Haring – late artist
- Peter Hujar – late artist
- Annie Leibovitz – photographer
- Zoe Leonard – founding member of fierce pussy, visual artist
- J.C. Leyendecker – late illustrator, creator of the Arrow Collar Man
- Robert Mapplethorpe – late photographer
- Susan Mikula – photographer and artist
- Larry Rivers – late painter, sculptor
- Carter Smith – fashion photographer
- Sam Wagstaff – art curator
- Andy Warhol – late artist
- Lucian Wintrich – artist and photographer.
- Carrie Yamaoka – founding member of fierce pussy, visual artist

== See also ==
- Culture of New York City
- Drag ball culture
- Drag culture in New York City
- Gay Asian & Pacific Islander Men of New York
- Homosocialization
- LGBTQ Americans
- LGBTQ culture in New York City
- LGBTQ history in New York
- LGBTQ rights in New York
- LGBTQ rights in the United States
- New York City demographics
- New York City Gay Men's Chorus
- New York City Drag March
- NYC Pride March
- Queens Liberation Front
- Pose
- The Queen
- The Boys in the Band
- Transgender culture in New York City
- Wigstock
