= Jonte' Moaning =

American choreographer and dancer

Jonte' Demarcus Moaning
- Born: October 9, 1982 (age 43); Portland, Oregon, United States
- Occupations: Choreographer; dancer; singer

Jonte' Moaning (born October 9, 1982, in Portland, Oregon), also known as Jonte', is an American choreographer, dancer, singer-songwriter, and model.

== Life and career ==
Jonte' was born on October 9, 1982, in Portland, Oregon. He began his dance career at the age of 13, enrolling in the Oregon Ballet Theatre. After graduating from high school, Jonte' moved to New York City to train with the Alvin Ailey American Dance Theater. In 2004, he performed as a backup dancer for Janet Jackson in the controversial Super Bowl XXXVIII halftime show. He is perhaps best known for his work with Beyoncé Knowles as a choreographer on her 2007 world tour, The Beyoncé Experience. He also choreographed a number of Beyoncé music videos, most notably "Freakum Dress."

Jonte' is also active in the Japanese entertainment industry. He first visited Japan when he was invited to teach dance workshops in Hiroshima in 2004, and since then has worked as a choreographer for major Asian pop artists and groups including Jolin Tsai, Namie Amuro, Double, Wonder Girls, 2PM, Miss A, and T-ara. In addition to choreography and modeling work, Jonte' has also makes frequent appearances in Japanese television programming and advertising campaigns, most notably for Lotte brand Ice Breakers and Tokyo Mode Gakuen, an academy of fashion and design. He was also featured in the promotional video for the J-Pop group GReeeeN's 2013 single "A-I-U-E-Ongaku," which was used as the opening theme for the anime Line Offline: Salaryman and Linetown, though he is perhaps most recognized for his appearance in the end credits to the long-running NHK children's program Tensai Terebi-kun.

Jonte' released his first solo single, "Bitch You Betta" in 2008. He has stated that he was inspired to become a solo artist while working with performing artists and feeling that he "could do it better."

As a performer, Jonte' is known for his androgynous look and trademark high heels. He is openly gay, and although sometimes referred to as a drag queen, does not identify as such. In an interview with Out magazine, he describes his own gender identity as follows: "I'm just an androgynous male. That's it. I look good in women's clothes so I might as well wear them, you know? That's what it is. I'm really not a drag queen. Although I love drag queens, that's really not me."

== Discography ==
- "Bitch You Betta" - 2008
- "Ya Rude!" - 2011
- "High Kick Pow" (EP) - 2011
- "Tiger" (featuring Dai Burger and Ansoni) - 2013
- "Alcoholic" - 2013
- "Dejavux" - 2013
- "Klassy" (Collaboration with Jack Rayner)- 2020

== See also ==
- LGBT culture in New York City
- List of LGBT people from New York City
- List of LGBT people from Portland, Oregon
- NYC Pride March
