= Juliana Huxtable =

American artist

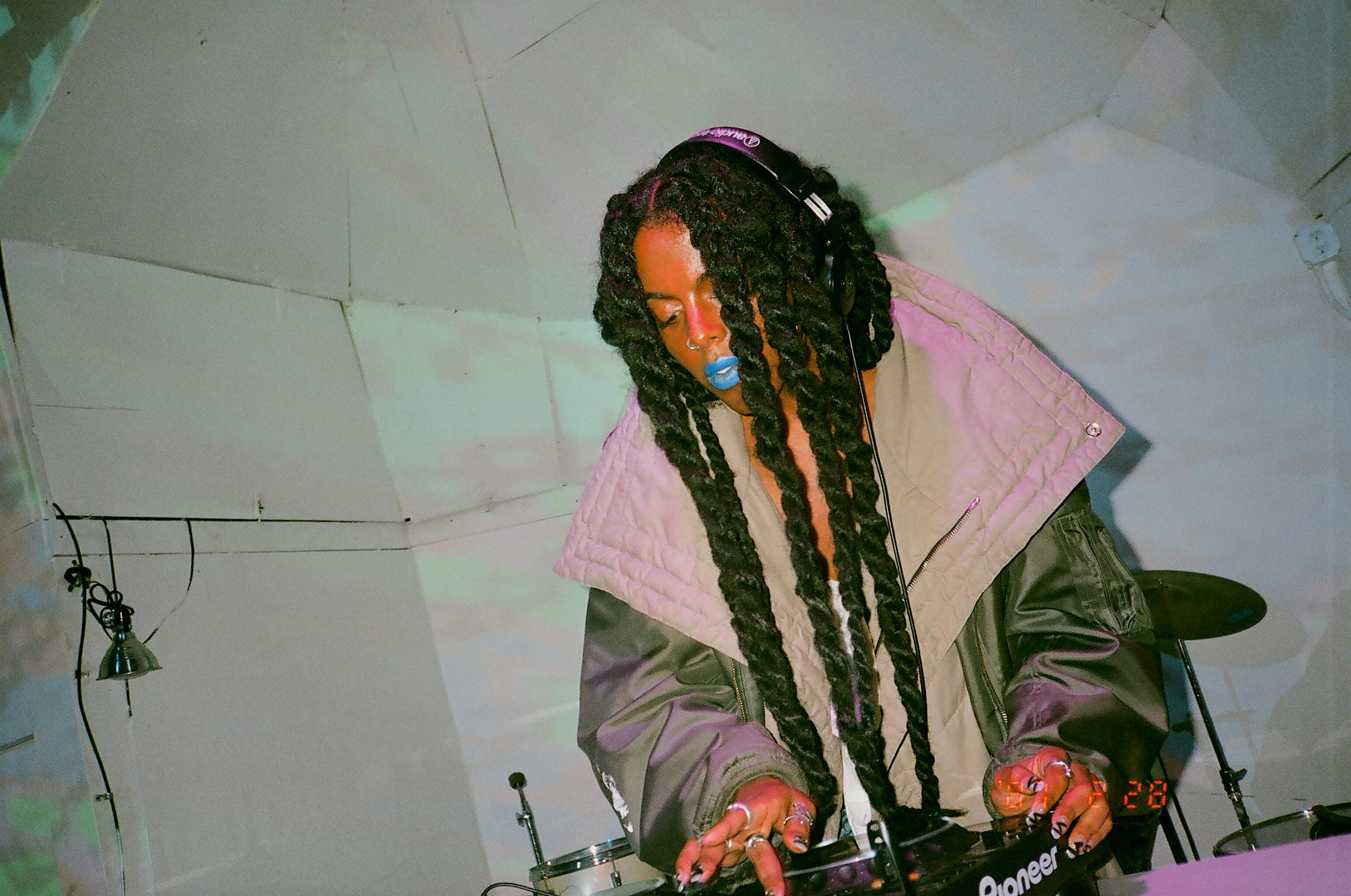
- Born: December 29, 1987 (age 38); Bryan-College Station, Texas, U.S.
- Education: Bard College (BA)

Juliana Huxtable (born December 29, 1987) is an American artist, writer, performer, DJ, and co-founder of the New York–based nightlife project Shock Value. Huxtable has exhibited and performed at a number of venues including Reena Spaulings Fine Art, Project Native Informant, Artists Space, the New Museum, the Museum of Modern Art, Portland Institute for Contemporary Art, and Institute of Contemporary Arts. Huxtable's multidisciplinary art practice explores a number of projects, such as the internet, the body, history, and text, often through a process she calls "conditioning." Huxtable is a published author of two books and a member of the New York City–based collective House of Ladosha. She is on the roster of the talent agency Discwoman, a New York based collective and talent agency that books DJs for parties and events around the world. She previously lived and worked in New York City, and has been based in Berlin since 2020.

== Early life and education ==
Huxtable was born in Bryan-College Station, Texas. She has described her hometown as a typical "conservative Bible Belt town in Texas." Huxtable's mother, Kassandra, raised Huxtable and her two siblings alone after Huxtable's parents divorced.

Huxtable was born intersex and began her transition after college. She notes that struggles with gender conformity and sex identity started earlier in life.

Huxtable moved to New York to attend Bard College and graduated in 2010.

Huxtable has spoken about her desire to be a painter while growing up and enrolled in several painting classes during college. She abandoned the medium after professors criticized her for her "obsession with" formal technique and identity. In an interview with artist Lorraine O'Grady, Huxtable mentioned studying literature and gender studies.

== Emerging in New York ==
Huxtable moved to New York to work as a legal assistant for the ACLU's Racial Justice Program after college. While at the ACLU, Huxtable amassed a significant following on Tumblr, posting long stream-of-consciousness poems and self-portraits that experimented with fashion and Nuwaubian imagery.

After leaving her position at the ACLU, Huxtable began DJing. In August of 2013 Huxtable DJ'd at the Studio Museum in Harlem's Uptown Fridays party series. The same year Huxtable participated in the House of Ladosha's show The Whole House Eats (stylized as THE WHOLE HOUSE EATS) at Superchief Gallery. During her time as a DJ, Huxtable integrated her poetry into DJ mixes. Huxtable's poetry was featured in the song "Blood Oranges" from Le1f's mixtape Tree House as well as the runway soundtrack for the Hood by Air 2014 Fall/Winter fashion show "10,000 Screaming Faggots" by Total Freedom.

Huxtable's interest in fashion led her to model for a number of fashion houses and campaigns. In 2014, she was featured on the fifth anniversary cover of C☆NDY magazine along with a number of other transgender women – Janet Mock, Carmen Carrera, Geena Rocero, Isis King, Leyna Ramous, Yasmine Petty, and Laverne Cox. Huxtable has modeled for DKNY, Eckhaus Latta, Chromat, and French fashion house Kenzo.

In August 2014, Huxtable performed in the video for the Hercules and Love Affair song "My Offence." The video features excerpts of conversations with figures from New York City's queer nightlife scene such as Honey Dijon. The band's primary member, Andrew Butler, described the song and its video as an examination of his "relationship to taboo words and the use of 'cunt' amongst NYC's gay community to relay flattery, empowerment and strength".

== Work ==
=== New Museum Triennial and Performa 15 Biennial ===
In early 2015, Huxtable was selected to present work in the 2015 New Museum Triennial Surround Audience, curated by Lauren Cornell and artist Ryan Trecartin. Huxtable included two text-based works and two self-portraits, each an inkjet print from the series Universal Crop Tops For All The Self-Canonized Saints of Becoming. These works, along with a sculpture by fellow Triennial artist Frank Benson that depicted a life-sized Huxtable rendered in iridescent colors, were prominent works in the show. Vogue Writer Mark Guiducci dubbed Huxtable the "Star of the New Museum Triennial".

She premiered on season two of Ovation TV's web-based talk show, Touching the Art, hosted by fellow 2015 Triennial artist Casey Jane Ellison. Artist K8 Hardy and New Museum curator Shelley Fox Aarons were also guests in the same episode.

Later that year, Huxtable was selected to showcase a new performance piece in the Performa 15 Biennial. The hour-long performance titled, There Are Certain Facts That Cannot Be Disputed, was presented at the Museum of Modern Art. It included poetry, audio and voice over, video elements, and live-music with fellow collaborators and explored the complicated relationship between the ephemeral nature of digital information and the drive for historical documentation on the internet. As described by the festival's organizers, Huxtable's performance considered "cyberspace as a twilight zone of precariousness and preservation, traversing closed servers, bounced URLs, and Google cache as human and digital characters".

=== Shock Value, House of Ladosha, and other projects ===
Huxtable is a founder and DJ for Shock Value, a weekly New York City–based nightlife collective run by women artists, DJs, writers, and fashion icons. She is also member of the New York City–based collective House of Ladosha. Members include Cunty Crawford Ladosha (Adam Radakovich), Neon Christina Ladosha, Paws Off Ladosha (Riley Hooker), Magatha Ladosha (Michael Magnan), La Fem Ladosha (Antonio Blair), and YSL Ladosha (Yan Sze Li). In January 2016, House of Ladosha showcased various art projects in This Is Your Brain. In 2017, the collective was selected to participate in the group exhibition Trigger: Gender as a Weapon and a Tool at the New Museum. They were also featured in Issue 7 of the magazine Gayletter.

Huxtable currently sits on the editorial board for Topical Cream, a New York–based platform that supports a community of artists, writers, designers, and technologists through digital publishing and public programming initiatives.

In 2016, Huxtable was a Visiting Artists Program lecturer at the School of the Art Institute of Chicago.

Huxtable has participated in multiple panels and lectures, including Basquiat and Contemporary Queer Art hosted by the Schomburg Center for Research in Black Culture, Transgender in the Mainstream hosted by Art Basel Miami Beach, Body Work: Performance and Practice hosted by Art Basel and Open Score: Generation You presented by the New Museum and Rhizome.

Also in 2016, Huxtable headlined the opening night performance of the Portland Institute for Contemporary Art's Time-Based Art Festival in Portland, Oregon.

=== Solo exhibitions ===
Huxtable's first solo exhibition, A Split During Laughter at the Rally, opened at Reena Spaulings in New York City in May 2017. The exhibition featured several posters with DIY-inspired magnets, a video piece featuring members from House of Ladosha, and a flow chart. The show explored "the aesthetics of conspiracy and American paranoia" through various modes of resistance, alienation, and irony. Huxtable notes that the posters in the exhibition were formally inspired by American artist Emory Douglas.

Huxtable's second solo exhibition, Juliana Huxtable, opened at Project Native Informant in London, England in October 2017. The exhibition featured three photographs of a black subject with various (often conflicting) tattoos, four sculptural paintings made of military-style clothing, and ten pamphlet-sized posters recounting, "a brawl between Antifa leftist skinheads and Nazi skinheads outside of a Fred Perry sample sale in Paris". The show continues Huxtable's exploration into conspiracy theories and paranoia, subcultures, and identity but on a more humorous note. Fashion also plays a major role throughout Huxtable's practice as this show highlights. Huxtable has referenced Jose Esteban-Muñoz's "Disidentification" as a major inspiration.

=== Books ===
Huxtable has produced two books and contributed to a number of chapbooks and artist's writing anthologies.

Her first book, Mucus in My Pineal Gland, was published in 2017 by Capricious. The book is a collection of previously performed poems, like UNTITLED (FOR STEWART) and THERE ARE CERTAIN FACTS THAT CANNOT BE DISPUTED, as well as a number of new poems. The book is written in her typical all-caps style and blue font.

Huxtable's second book, Life, was co-written with artist Hannah Black. The novel is a work of science-fiction and is written in both English and German. It was released in 2017 by König.

=== Music ===
Huxtable has collaborated with renowned producer SOPHIE, forming a music duo called Analemma. The duo produced two tracks on Locus Error, an acid techno concept album released through Nina Kraviz's Trip Records. Huxtable also contributed vocals to one of the two tracks, "Plunging Asymptote", which would later appear on SOPHIE's posthumous self-titled album.

== Awards ==
Huxtable received a 2019 United States Artists Fellowship.

== Themes ==
Huxtable's practice is interdisciplinary by nature and thus explores a range of topics. Earlier works explore ideas of identity, the body, and text, with influences from Afrofuturism and science fiction. Huxtable's more recent works explore language, conspiracy theories, fashion (Baroque costumes, military surplus, punk aesthetics, etc.), and various countercultures. Huxtable's visual practice includes, "examining and remixing enduring imagery that, in her observations, retain 'symbolic power.'"

Steven Zultanski writes of Huxtable's Mucus in My Pineal Gland, "...doesn't idealize genrelessness, it moves between genres, unmooring moments of personal experience and speculative thought from literary conventions in order to situate them in the world outside of the text, while reflecting on and enjoying those conventions." Huxtable often, "references her use of digital spaces, including Tumblr," chat rooms, social media, online sexual subcultures, Encarta, and Afripedia as well as childhood, fashion, consumer culture, and the African diaspora.

Huxtable has noted a range of influences including writers Octavia Butler and Samuel R. Delany, theorists Luce Irigaray and Jose Esteban-Muñoz, and the visual aesthetics of video director Hype Williams, bands TLC and Blaque, and singer Aaliyah. Nuwaubian culture has often been a major source of inspiration for her as well. Huxtable's Mucus in My Pineal Gland is dedicated to "Herculine, Borges, LaDosha, and Pickaninny Punks."

== Exhibitions and performances ==
Solo exhibitions

- Juliana Huxtable: USSYPHILIA, at Fotografiska Berlin, Germany, 2023-24
- INTERFERTILITY INDUSTRIAL COMPLEX: SNATCH THE CALF BACK, Reena Spaulings Fine Art, New York, NY, 2019
- Juliana Huxtable, Project Native Informant, London, England, 2017
- A Split During Laughter at the Rally, Reena Spaulings Fine Art, New York, NY, 2017

Group exhibitions

- Dirge, JTT, New York, NY, 2017
- Perverts, Cell Project Space, London, 2017
- Time-Based Art Festival 2016, Portland Institute for Contemporary Art, Portland, OR, 2016
- Seduction of a Cyborg, Human Resources, Los Angeles, CA, 2016
- DISSENT: what they fear is the light, Curated by Shoghig Halajian and Thomas Lawson, Los Angeles, CA, 2016
- Bring Your Own Body: transgender between archives and aesthetics, 41 Cooper Gallery, Cooper Union, New York City, New York, 2015
- 2015 Triennial: Surround Audience, New Museum, New York, NY, 2015

Selected online exhibitions

- New Black Portraiture, Curated by Aria Dean, Rhizome.org
- Collection Online at Solomon R. Guggenheim Museum.

Performances

- Stewart Uoo presents It's Get Better V, Institute of Contemporary Arts, London, England, 2017
- Bring Your Own Body, Organized by Jeanne Vaccaro with Stamatina Gregory, 41 Cooper Gallery, New York, NY, 2015
- Step and Repeat, Museum of Contemporary Art, Los Angeles, CA, 2015
- There Are Certain Facts That Cannot Be Disputed, Performa 15 Biennial co-commissioned by Museum of Modern Art, New York, NY, 2015
- Leigha Mason & Casey Jane Ellison present Inner Space, MoMA PS1, Queens, NY, 2014
- 1NVERS1ONS, in collaboration with Nick Mauss, Kim Gordon, Juliana Huxtable, Northern Ballet, and National Youth Ballet of Great Britain, Frieze Projects, London, England, 2014
- Stewart Uoo presents It's Get Better II, Artists Space, New York, NY, 2014
- Take Ecstasy with Me, Organized by Alexandro Segade (of My Barbarian) & Miguel Gutierrez, Whitney Museum of American Art, New York, NY, 2014
- Looking Back: The Eighth White Columns Annual – Selected by Pati Hertling, White Columns, New York, NY, 2014
- Stewart Uoo presents It's Get Better, Artists Space, New York, NY, 2013

== Discography ==
- "Lionsong" (Björk remix, 2015, One Little Indian Records) (Lionsong included the remix by Juliana Huxtable.)
- Black History Month in 3D Mix with Dedekind Cut fka Lee Bannon 2016

== See also ==
- LGBT culture in New York City
- List of LGBT people from New York City
- NYC Pride March

== Bibliography ==
- Life: a novel, co-written with Hannah Black (König, 2017). OCLC 988257749
- Mucus in My Pineal Gland (Capricious and Wonder, 2017). OCLC 987796847
- Social medium: artists writing 2000–2015 (Paper Monument, 2016). OCLC 957598488
- Future Perfect, edited by Andrew Durbin (BGSQD, 2014). OCLC 876708570
- The Animated Reader: Poetry of 'Surround Audience' (New York: New Museum: in association with McNally Jackson, 2015). OCLC 949731062
- New Art Dealers Alliance Contemporary Poetry Zine, curated by Sam Gordon (Brooklyn: Sam Gordon, 2013) OCLC 892560607
