= Teddy Quinlivan =

American model (born 1994)

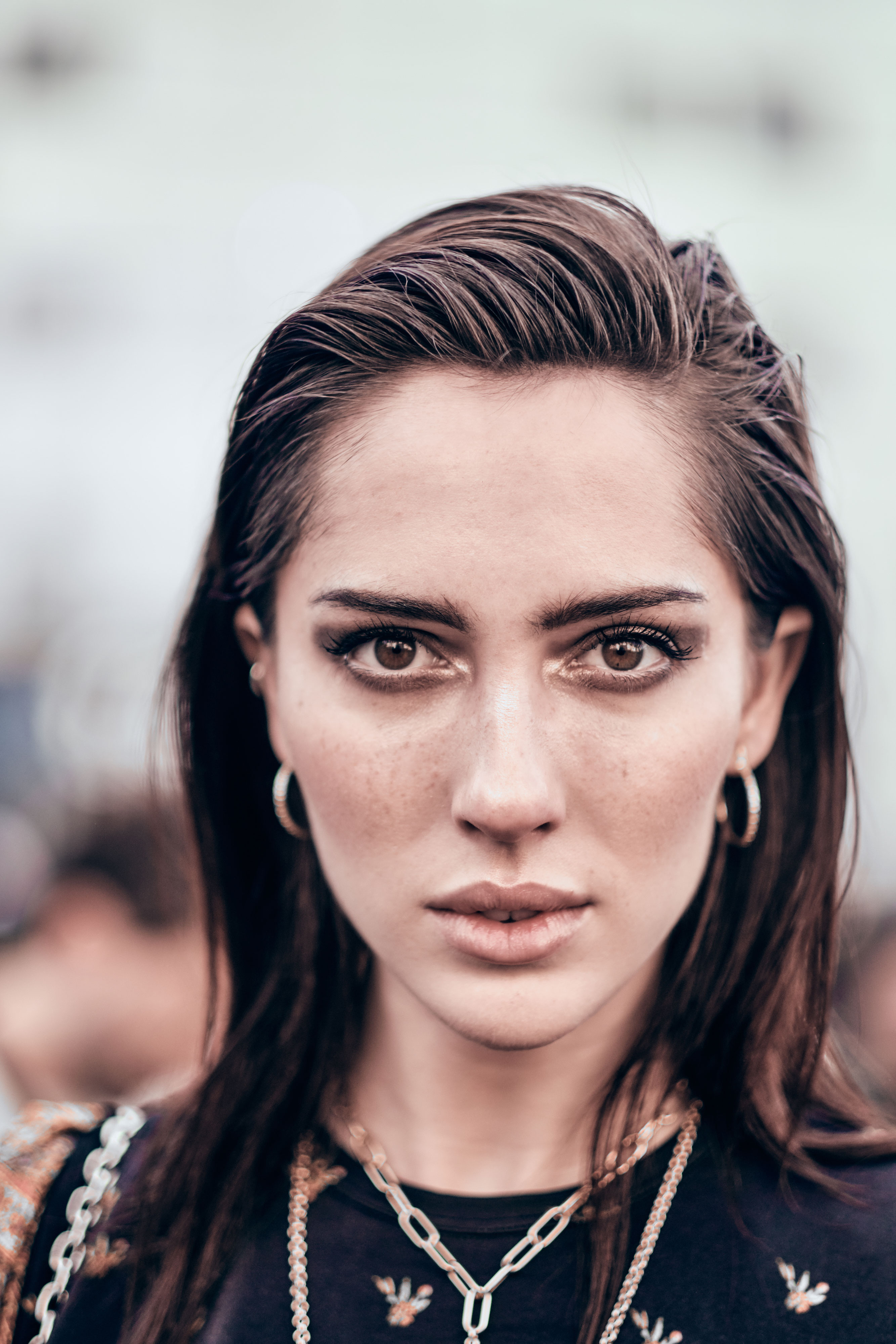
- Born: 22 June 1994 (age 31); Shrewsbury, Massachusetts, U.S.
- Occupation: Fashion model
- Modeling information
- Height: 1.80 m (5 ft 11 in)
- Hair color: Brown
- Eye color: Brown
- Agency: VISION Los Angeles; Supreme Management (New York); Premium Models (Paris); Monster Management (Milan); Select Model Management (London); Scoop Models (Copenhagen)

Theodora "Teddy" Quinlivan is an American model. She was discovered in 2015, by Nicolas Ghesquière, Louis Vuitton's creative director.

== Career ==
In September 2017, Quinlivan came out as transgender. Her announcement was praised by Ghesquière, designer Marc Jacobs, make-up artist Pat McGrath, and others in the fashion industry.

She has walked for designers including Carolina Herrera, Jeremy Scott, Jason Wu, Dior, Louis Vuitton, and Saint Laurent.

In 2019, Quinlivan became the first openly transgender model to be hired by Chanel.

She was ranked as one of the "Top 50" models by models.com.

Quinlivan vowed to stop working for any designer or brand who worked with people accused of sexual misconduct after experiencing it herself.

While in New York, Quinlivan got involved in the downtown nightlife scene. She served as Creative Engagement Director of a recurring party called "INFERNO" with partner Dante Cardenas. In 2024, Quinlivan launched her own weekly party at restaurant Jean's in New York City. The party, dubbed "Electric Pussycat," ran for several months before she moved to Paris in May 2025.

== Personal life ==
Quinlivan grew up in Shrewsbury, Massachusetts. She studied art at Walnut Hill School for the Arts. She resided in New York City for several years before relocating to Paris in 2025.

She is Catholic.

== See also ==
- LGBTQ culture in New York City
- List of LGBTQ people from New York City
- Transgender culture of New York City
