= Justina Miles =

American Sign Language performer (2002-)

- Born: Justina Taylor Miles; September 12, 2002 (age 23)
- Years active: 2020–present
- Known for: Super Bowl LVII halftime show

Justina Taylor Miles (born September 12, 2002) is a Deaflympics athlete and American Sign Language (ASL) performer. She won a silver medal at the 2021 Summer Deaflympics and in 2023 she became the first deaf woman to perform American Sign Language at the Super Bowl pre-game and halftime shows.

== Biography ==
Justina Miles is from Philadelphia. She graduated from the Model Secondary School for the Deaf in Washington D.C. She is attending Bowie State University studying nursing.

Miles was part of Team USA at the 2021 Summer Deaflympics (held May 2022) in Caxias do Sul, Brazil, where she received a silver medal for 4 × 100 m women's relay. She also competed in the 100 m and 200 m events.

Miles's performance in ASL of Lil' Kim's "Crush on You" went viral on TikTok in 2020. She has signed for various live music events, such as the Super Bowl LVII halftime show and pre-show in 2023. Her performance at the Super Bowl LVII halftime show, where she translated various songs by Rihanna such as "Bitch Better Have My Money", "Work", "Umbrella", and "Diamonds", was the first ever Super Bowl performance by a Black deaf woman and went viral with millions of views on social media.

In November 2023, Miles was named to the BBC's 100 Women list.
