= Swim Miami =

Annual swimming event in Florida, U.S.

Swim Miami logo.

Swim Miami is an open-water swimming event held annually in south Florida. Races typically take place in March or April every year. Today the event is owned and operated by the H2Os Foundation, a foundation dedicated to eradicating drowning in south Florida. The swim also helps to develop open-water swimming as an Olympic-style sport in Florida.

== History ==
The original Swim Miami began in 1989 by Jimmy Woodman, founder of Active.com, in conjunction with Florida Sports Magazine and continued successfully through 1998. In 2005, Miami Sports International, a subsidiary of Swim Gym Aquatics, led by four-year University of Florida swimming captain Jonathan Strauss, then restored the event and adapted it to the future of open water swimming.

The original idea and concepts for Swim Miami came about due to a demand to bring open-water swimming to the forefront of aquatic sports with intentions of developing it into an Olympic sport. It was also created as a way for swimmers to give back to the sport that was able to give them a life of health and fitness.

Swim Miami's growth and popularity can largely be accredited to its focus on Olympic-style swimming and its elite swim field. Past Olympians and professionals to swim in the event have included Gary Hall, Jr., Milorad Čavić, George Bovell, Ricardo Monasterio, Anthony Ervin, Ed Moses, Nathan Adrian, Robert Strauss, and Tiffany Cohen.

== Current day ==
Swim Miami takes place annually in April. Originally staged at the Miami Rowing Club in Key Biscayne, FL, the event moved to the Miami Yacht Club on Watson Island (Miami) in 2011. Swim Miami currently consists of four swims: a ten-kilometer swim, a five-kilometer swim, the Miami Mile, and an eight-hundred meter swim. In 2017, the event returned to its original location at the Miami Rowing Club.

Once restored, Swim Miami was first sponsored by the brand Speedo in 2005 and 2006. Sponsorship has since switched to the Nike Swim brand, licensed and owned by Perry Ellis International.

Due to strong popular branding of both the swim and its location, the event is well patronized by the general public, attracting upwards of 2,000 combined participants and spectators in the four race categories.

In 2015, the success of the Swim Miami race led organizers to create two additional events for the South Florida area, Swim Miami Beach and Swim Fort Lauderdale Beach. Those races ran annually through 2018 before the series reverted to a single race in 2019.

In 2020, the race was held on a "virtual" basis due to the COVID-19 pandemic, with swimmers swimming the various race distances on their own and then submitting their times to be recorded by the event staff. The race returned to its traditional in-person competitive format in 2021.
