= Peche Di =

American model

Peche Di is a transgender model, dancer, actress, videographer, and modeling agent. She started the first transgender modeling agency in the U.S., in New York City. Di was born in Bangkok, Thailand. After winning several pageants, she entered America’s Next Top Model competition in New York City.

In 2014, Di was featured on the fifth anniversary cover of C☆NDY magazine along with 13 other transgender women.

Di founded Trans Models NYC, a modeling agency focusing on transgender representation in modeling, in May 2015.

== See also ==
- LGBTQ culture in New York City
- List of LGBTQ people from New York City
- NYC Pride March
