= Golightly =

Golightly is a surname. Notable people with the surname include:

- Gage Golightly (born 1993), American actress
- Holly Golightly (disambiguation), several people, including
  - Holly Golightly (illustrator) (born 1964), comic book writer and artist
  - Holly Golightly (singer) (born 1966), British singer-songwriter
- John Golightly (born 1936) Welsh actor
- Velveta Golightly-Howell (born 1957), American lawyer
- W. L. Golightly, college basketball head coach

== Fictional characters ==
- Emilia Golightly, fictional Irish presenter
- Holly Golightly (character), protagonist of Truman Capote's novel, Breakfast at Tiffany's
- Reverend Mervyn Golightly, fictional character in the Endeavour, Series 4, Episode Canticle
- Reverend Arnold Golightly, fictional character in Doctor Who, Series 4, Episode 7: The Unicorn and the Wasp
- Sheriff Golightly, fictional character in the 2nd episode of Season 2 of Fringe, "Night of Desirable Objects"
- James Golightly, one of the names of the main character of Percival Everett’s novel James
- Sweetpea Golightly, fictional character in Season 3 of Industry

== See also ==
- GoLite, an American clothing manufacturer
- GoLYTELY, a macrogol solution for bowel irrigation
- Mr Golightly's Holiday, a novel by Salley Vickers
