= Dallas DuBois =

American actor and drag queen

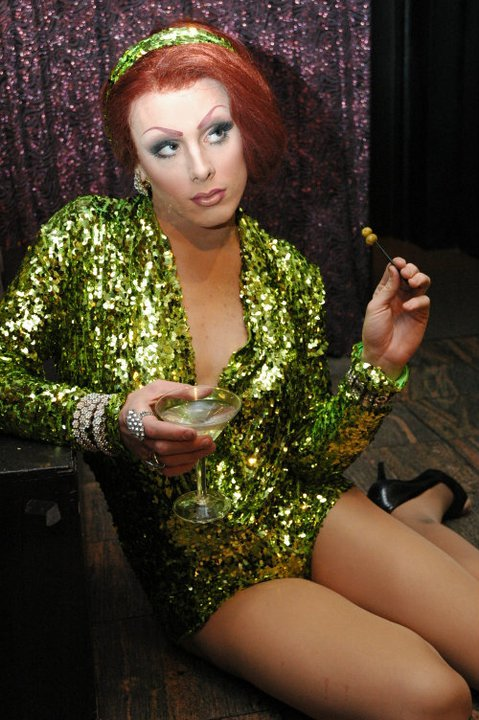
- Born: Daniel Logan; June 9, 1986 (age 40); Long Island, New York
- Occupations: Actor, drag queen

Daniel Logan, better known by his stage name Dallas DuBois, is an American actor and drag queen.

== Early life ==
Daniel Logan was born on Long Island on June 9, 1986 and grew up in Seaford, New York.

== Career ==
Logan first started doing drag in 2008. He had previously used the drag name "Madonna Manson."

DuBois was featured in the web series Queens of Drag: NYC by gay.com in 2010. The series featured fellow New York drag queens Bianca Del Rio, Hedda Lettuce, Lady Bunny, Mimi Imfurst, Peppermint, Acid Betty, Epiphany Get Paid and Sherry Vine.

He is the founder of the theatre group Pure Imagination and the nonprofit charity Broadway to Benefit. Both groups educate about HIV/AIDS. Logan is HIV-positive.

In 2013, DuBois competed in the Miss'd America pageant, placing second runner-up. Victoria "Porkchop" Parker was the winner. He had previously competed in the pageant in 2011.

== Filmography ==
=== Film ===
Year	Title	Role	Notes
2004	Dead End Massacre	Tim Baker	
2010	Children of the Dune		Short film
2012	The Coffee Shop	Bea Reasonable	
2012	The Replacement	Bea Reasonable	Short film
2013	Lady Peacock	Broccoli Spears	
2013	Gay Positive	Himself	Documentary

=== Television ===
Year	Title	Role	Notes
2006	Six Degrees	Drunk teen	Episode 4: "The Puncher"
2007	General Hospital: Night Shift	Patient #3	Season 1, Episode 3: "Paternity Ward"
2011	Primetime: What Would You Do?	Himself	
2013	Threesome	Himself	Season 2, Episode 1 Season 2, Episode 4 Season 2, Episode 6 Season 2, Episode 9

=== Web series ===
Year	Title	Role	Notes
2010	Queens of Drag: NYC	Himself	Produced by gay.com

=== Music video appearances ===
Year	Song	Director
2010	"Lucille" (Ariel Aparicio)	N/A

== Theatre ==
Year	Title	Role	Theatre
2010	She'll Be Dying		Bowery Poetry Club
2010	Mayo on Your Breakfast at Tiffany's		Bowery Poetry Club

== See also ==
- Drag culture in New York City
- LGBTQ culture in New York City
- List of LGBTQ people from New York City
- NYC Drag March
- NYC Pride March
- Transgender culture in New York City
