= New York City Drag March =

Annual drag protest and visibility march

NYC Drag March
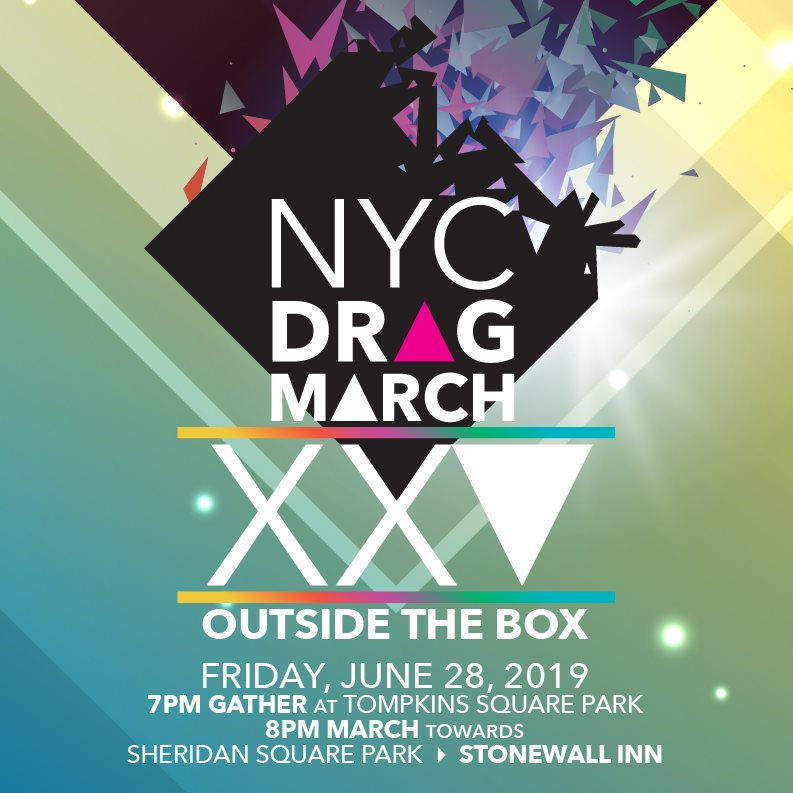
- Promotion for the 25th anniversary of the first Drag March.
- Frequency: annual; Friday prior to last Sunday in June
- Location: New York City
- Inaugurated: June 24, 1994
- Organizer: Grassroots collective
- June 26, 2026

The New York City Drag March, or NYC Drag March, is an annual drag protest and visibility march in New York City, held during LGBTQ pride month in June. Organized to coincide ahead of the NYC Pride March, both demonstrations commemorate the 1969 riots at the Stonewall Inn, widely considered the pivotal event sparking the gay liberation movement, and the modern fight for LGBTQ rights.

The Drag March takes place on Friday night as a kick-off to NYC Pride weekend. The event is purposefully non-corporate, punk, inclusive, and largely leaderless, starting in Tompkins Square Park and ending outside the Stonewall Inn.

== Background ==
New York City is home to the world's largest drag community and is known as the "Drag capital of the world". During preparations for Stonewall 25 in 1994, NYC Pride organizers announced neither leathermen nor drag queens would be allowed in the official ceremonies. Having recently moved to the city from San Francisco, California, activist Gilbert Baker, creator of the rainbow Pride flag and member of the drag nun troupe Sisters of Perpetual Indulgence, helped to organize the alternate drag march, alongside Brian Griffin, a.k.a. Harmonie Moore Must Die.

While creating a mile-long rainbow flag, the world's largest at the time, Baker came up with the idea, while Harmonie, working in Baker's shop, had grassroots organizational skills from work with ACT UP and Women's Health Action and Mobilization (WHAM), to organize the drag march. Harmonie was also a member of Church Ladies for Choice, an activist drag troupe that countered the anti-abortion group Operation Rescue. The Church Ladies were inspired by the San Francisco-based Sisters of Perpetual Indulgence (who didn't yet have a New York house) to collect and parody church pamphlets advertising the 1994 march with the slogan “Jesus Loves Drag,” they passed out the materials in gay bars.

== Starting location ==
Participants were directed to Tompkins Square Park as the starting point, chosen to honor the rebellious spirit of two previous riots that had taken place. The Tompkins Square Park riot of 1988 where city officials attempted to remove squatters and punks who had been living in the park, and the Tompkins Square Park riot of 1874, over a hundred years prior where “thousands of unemployed New Yorkers demonstrated to demand that the government establish public works programs following the Panic of 1873 and the ensuing depression”.

== First march ==
The first drag march had an estimated 10,000 participants spread over ten blocks. The start was marked by The Church Ladies singing "God Is a Lesbian," another new tradition. During the march the participants chanted sometimes absurd organizing calls, and at one point the entire march sang “Love Is All Around”, the theme from The Mary Tyler Moore Show opening sequence, a tradition that has continued. Organizers painted a banner stating “It’s just a drag march, you may applaud,” and Stonewall 25 tourists joined in from across the nation. At the Stonewall Inn the entire march joined to sing “(Somewhere) Over the Rainbow,” originally performed by gay icon Judy Garland in the 1939 film The Wizard of Oz. Garland's death, and subsequent funeral held in New York City, occurred days before the Stonewall Riots. (Note: In the years since the riots occurred, the death of Judy Garland earlier in the week on June 22, 1969 has been attributed as a significant factor in the riots, but no participants in Saturday morning's demonstrations recall Garland's name being discussed. No print accounts of the riots by reliable sources cite Garland as a reason for the riot, although one sarcastic account by a heterosexual publication suggested the riot was linked to the gay icon. (Carter, p. 260.) Although Sylvia Rivera recalls she was saddened and amazed by the turnout at Garland's funeral on Friday, June 27, she said that she did not feel like going out much but changed her mind later. (Duberman, pp. 190–191.) Bob Kohler used to talk to the homeless youth in Sheridan Square, and said, "When people talk about Judy Garland's death having anything much to do with the riot, that makes me crazy. The street kids faced death every day. They had nothing to lose. And they couldn't have cared less about Judy. We're talking about kids who were fourteen, fifteen, sixteen. Judy Garland was the middle-aged darling of the middle-class gays. I get upset about this because it trivializes the whole thing." (Deitcher, p. 72.))

== 1995 to present ==
Harmonie continued to organize the event for the next few years before moving out of state, New York City Radical Faeries stepped in with Hucklefaery, a Radical Faerie and Sister of Perpetual Indulgence, becoming involved in 1998. The Faeries added rituals and centeredness. Hucklefaery stated, “we are unifying our intentions: to honor our ancestors; to celebrate those of us present at the March; and by being present, we are catalysts for a future yet unrealized.”Baker died in March 2017, and that year's march was dedicated to him.

The 25th anniversary of the first Drag March was celebrated in grand fashion on June 28, 2019, coinciding with Stonewall 50 – WorldPride NYC, the largest international LGBTQ event in history. The following year the Drag March had a notably smaller scale due to the coronavirus pandemic. The protest march resumed its usual "loud music, lots of dancing, cheeky chants... and hundreds of amazing outfits" in 2021. The 2022 Drag March coincided with the news that Roe v. Wade had been overturned. Satirical chants during the 2023 march drew criticism from conservatives. Political chants and messages of solidarity continued at subsequent marches.

== See also ==
- Drag culture in New York City
- LGBTQ culture in New York City
- List of largest LGBTQ events
- List of LGBTQ people from New York City
- NYC Pride March
- Queens Pride Parade
- Queer Liberation March
- Transgender culture of New York City

== Sources ==
- Carter, David (2004). Stonewall : the riots that sparked the gay revolution (1st ed.). New York: St. Martin's Press. ISBN 0312200250. OCLC 54079526.
- The question of equality: lesbian and gay politics in America since Stonewall. Deitcher, David. New York: Scribner. 1995. ISBN 0684800306. OCLC 32346596.
- Duberman, Martin B. (1993). Stonewall (First ed.). New York. ISBN 0525936025. OCLC 26854943.
