= Paige Turner =

Paige Turner may refer to:

- Paige Turner (drag queen)
- Paige Turner (musician)

== See also ==
- Page Turner (disambiguation)
