= Page Turner =

Page Turner may refer to:

== Arts and entertainment ==
- Page-turner, a person who turns pages of sheet music for a musician during a performance
- The Page Turner, a 2006 French film
- Page Turner (TV series), a 2016 South Korean teen drama
- "Page Turner" (CSI: NY), a 2008 TV episode
- "Page Turner" (Star vs. the Forces of Evil), a 2016 TV episode
- Page Turner, an annual festival hosted by the Asian American Writers' Workshop

== Other uses ==
- Sir Gregory Page-Turner, 3rd Baronet (1748–1805), English landowner and politician

== See also ==
- Paige Turner (disambiguation)
