= Hedda Lettuce =

American drag queen, comedian and singer

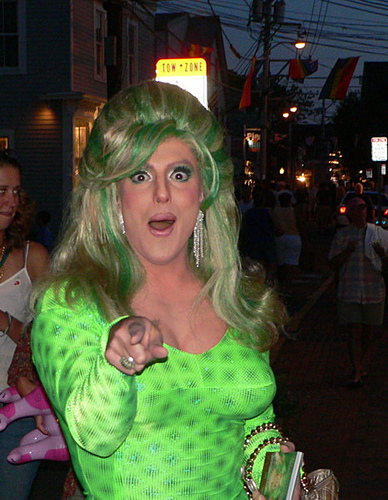
- Hedda Lettuce in Provincetown in August 2006
- Born: Steven Polito c. 1969-1970 (aged 55-57); New York City, NY
- Occupations: Actor; singer; comedian; presenter
- Years active: 1991 – present
- Website: www.heddalettuce.com

Hedda Lettuce (c. 1969/1970) is the stage name of Steven Polito, an American drag queen, actor, comedian, singer and presenter.

Polito debuted his character Hedda Lettuce in 1991 on the Manhattan Cable TV show The Brenda and Glennda Show. Lettuce's appearances include MTV, Comedy Central, The People's Court, and a cameo on Sex and the City as Samantha's ex-beau turned Bingo Drag impersonator. Lettuce's film appearances include To Wong Foo, Thanks for Everything! Julie Newmar; Cruise Control, The Look, Red Lipstick, and Musical Chairs. Pickle considers Hedda Lettuce an influence.

== Early life ==
Hedda Lettuce was born c. 1969-1970 as Steven Polito in New York City and raised on Long Island. He went to Commack North High School. Polito earned a bachelor's degree at the Fashion Institute of Technology. His first performance in drag was with a friend at Sheridan Square to raise money for Queer Nation. Polito later became an assistant to Lypsinka.

== Filmography ==
=== Film ===
Year	Title	Role	Notes
1995	To Wong Foo Thanks for Everything, Julie Newmar	Himself	
2000	Red Lipstick	Bonnie	
2001	Cruise Control		Short film
2003	The Look	Himself	
2005	Dangerous Liaisons	Himself	
2006	The Making of Michael Lucas' Dangerous Liaisons	Himself	
2009	Ptown Diaries	Himself	
2009	What's the Name of the Dame?	Himself	
2010	Stand-Up 360: Inside Out	Himself	
2010	Stood Up	Himself	Short film
2010	Violet Tendencies	Himself	
2011	Go Go Crazy	Himself	
2011	Musical Chairs	Drag Queen #1	

=== Television ===
Year	Title	Role	Notes
1997	The People’s Court	Self	
1999	Sex and the City	Drag Queen #1	Episode 21: "Old Dogs, New Dicks"
2004	Cooking's a Drag	Himself	
2008	Project Runway	Himself	Episode 6: "Good Queen Fun"
2008	Hot Gay Comics	Himself	Episode 3
2009	The Tyra Banks Show	Himself	
2010	Queens of Drag: NYC	Himself	
2010	Ugly Betty	Himself	Episode 13: "Chica and the Man"
2011	One Night Stand Up	Himself	Episode 10: Dragtastic NYC
2011	Unleashed by Garo	Himself	Episode 1

== See also ==
- Drag culture in New York City
- LGBTQ culture in New York City
- List of LGBTQ people from New York City
- NYC Drag March
- NYC Pride March
- Transgender culture in New York City
