= Drag culture in New York City =

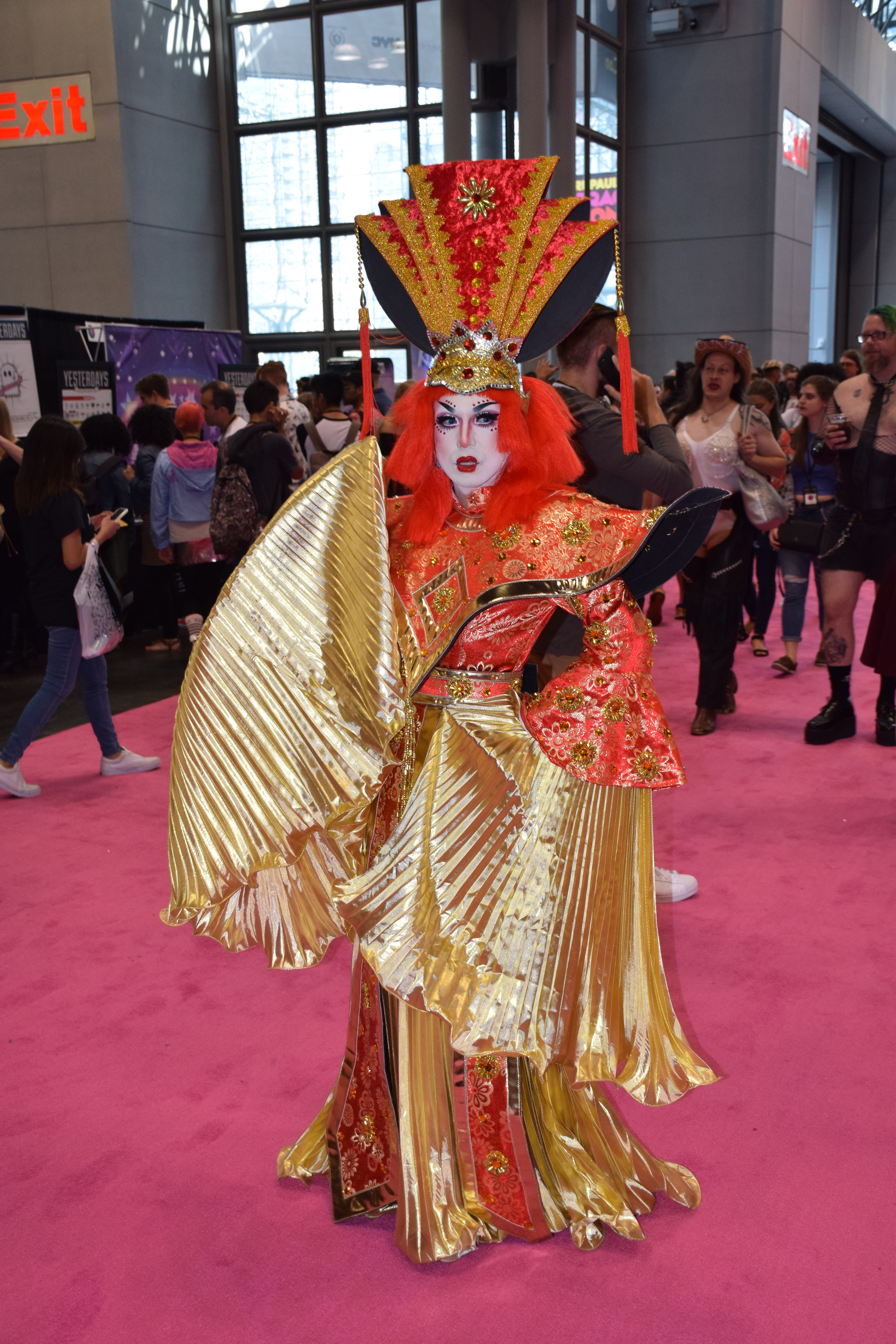
RuPaul's DragCon NYC, 2017

New York City is home to the world's largest drag community and is known as the "drag capital of the world". New York's drag culture and ballroom culture have both displayed a prominent presence within the overall LGBTQ culture of New York City itself. RuPaul's DragCon NYC is known as the world's largest celebration of drag culture and attracts over 100,000 attendees over multiple-day festivities annually.

== In Media ==
Both the film Paris is Burning from 1990 and the more recent television series Pose have portrayed the fabric of both drag and ballroom culture in New York City. Paris is Burning and Pose bring attention to the queer joy and liberation that Drag culture gives to those involved. They also creates awareness around how queer and transgender culture are strongly intertwined with Drag. For any of the queens involved in these pieces of media, Ball culture is the only place they can express themselves. In 2009, RuPaul's Drag Race launched its first episode, founding a show that became a key part of queer culture. As it gained popularity it actively helped paved the way for LGBTQIA+ voices, through its conversations around gender and sexuality. The show also gave platform to Drag queens, a population of people who are often silenced.

== History of Drag Culture in New York City ==
Drag culture in NYC has developed across several eras and communities. It was first seen as female impersonation and in drag balls during the late nineteenth century. Then, as we entered the 1920s Jazz Age, we saw a rise in queer nightlife in NYC. Drag became an important part of the LGBTQ+ community and a place to express queerness. There are many performers and venues around all five boroughs in NYC, and just like the rest of NYC, drag culture changes with the times. Therefore, the history of drag in New York City represents both entertainment and places where performers can express gender identity.

== Ballroom Culture ==
Ballroom culture is one part of NYC’s history of drag, and it is very significant to the Black and Latino LGBTQ+ community in Harlem. As a result of racial discrimination in earlier drag competitions, ballroom was created. In addition to creating its own competitions, ballroom also had the house-ballroom system and its own categories. Drag houses can be considered like a chosen family, making LGBTQ+ individuals have a place to belong and feel welcomed. Realness, for example, was a category in which participants would compete to see who could better perform specific genders, classes, and social identities. Some scholars have said that by performing these ideas about race, class, sexuality, and gender, participants are creating ways to understand how they construct and express these concepts. Voguing is another dance form that started within NYC's Black and Latino LGBTQ+ ballroom community before being more widely recognized through popular culture.

== Brooklyn Drag Culture and Social Media ==
Brooklyn has also developed its own drag community. Performers use both physical performance spaces and digital media to create and maintain a shared identity for this community. The relationship between the surrounding city and performers’ contribution to this community has been studied. Social media has changed how drag performers communicate with audiences and with each other. While many performers have separate social-media accounts so they can distinguish between everyday life identities and performing personas, online platforms can be used to promote and build a community. These practices illustrate the ways that NYC drag culture adapts to changing communication technologies.

== Contemporary Challenges ==
Black and transgender drag performers in NYC continue to experience racism alongside financial instability associated with performance work. The high cost of housing in NYC, unpredictable income, and reduction of available performance spaces make it hard for performers to sustain a career doing drag in NYC. However, at the same time, drag and ballroom cultures provide spaces for creativity, acceptance of self and identity, personal agency, and empowerment for many LGBTQ+ individuals. For example, research on Black LGBTQ+ youth participating in NYC’s ballroom culture finds that participants experience personal agency and empowerment within these spaces.

== New York City Drag March ==
The New York City Drag March, or NYC Drag March, is an annual drag protest and visibility march taking place in June, the traditional LGBTQ pride month in New York City. Organized to coincide ahead of the NYC Pride March, both demonstrations commemorate the 1969 riots at the Stonewall Inn, widely considered the pivotal event sparking the gay liberation movement, and the modern fight for LGBT rights.

The Drag March takes place on Friday night as a kick-off to NYC Pride weekend. The event starts in Tompkins Square Park and ends in front of the Stonewall Inn; it is purposefully non-corporate, punk, inclusive, and largely leaderless.

In 2019, the 25th Drag March coincided with Stonewall 50 – WorldPride NYC 2019, the largest international LGBTQ event in history, with many as four million people attending in Manhattan alone; the Drag March took place June 28.

== Notable people ==
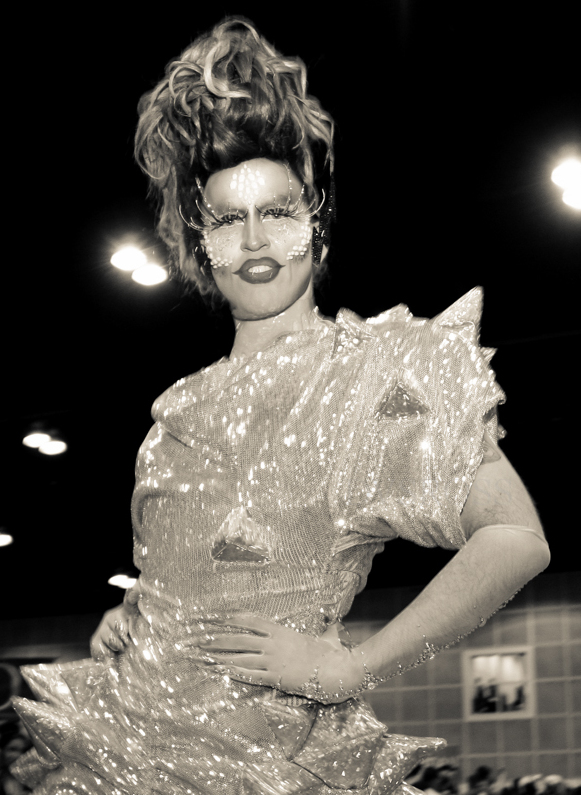
Acid Betty

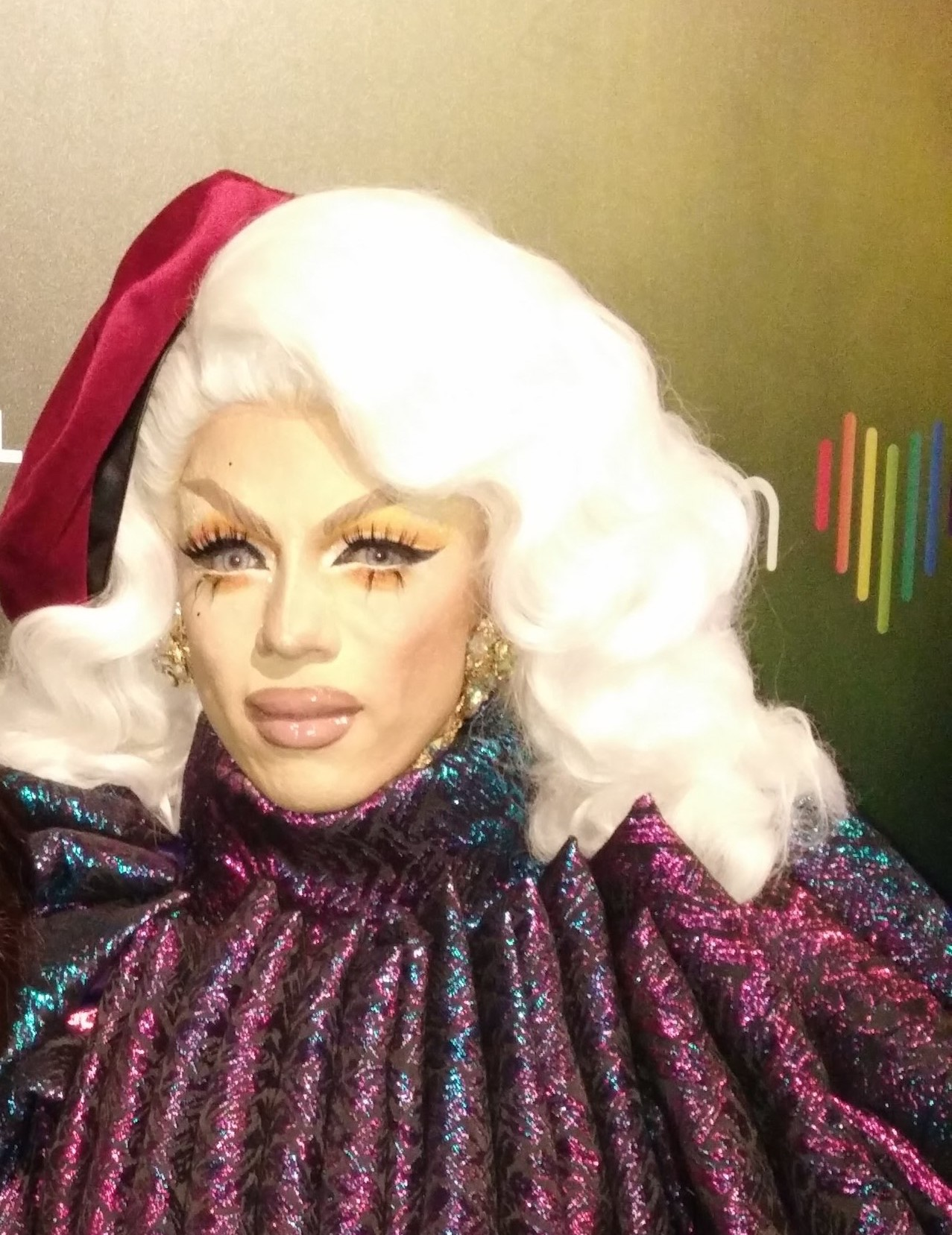
Aja

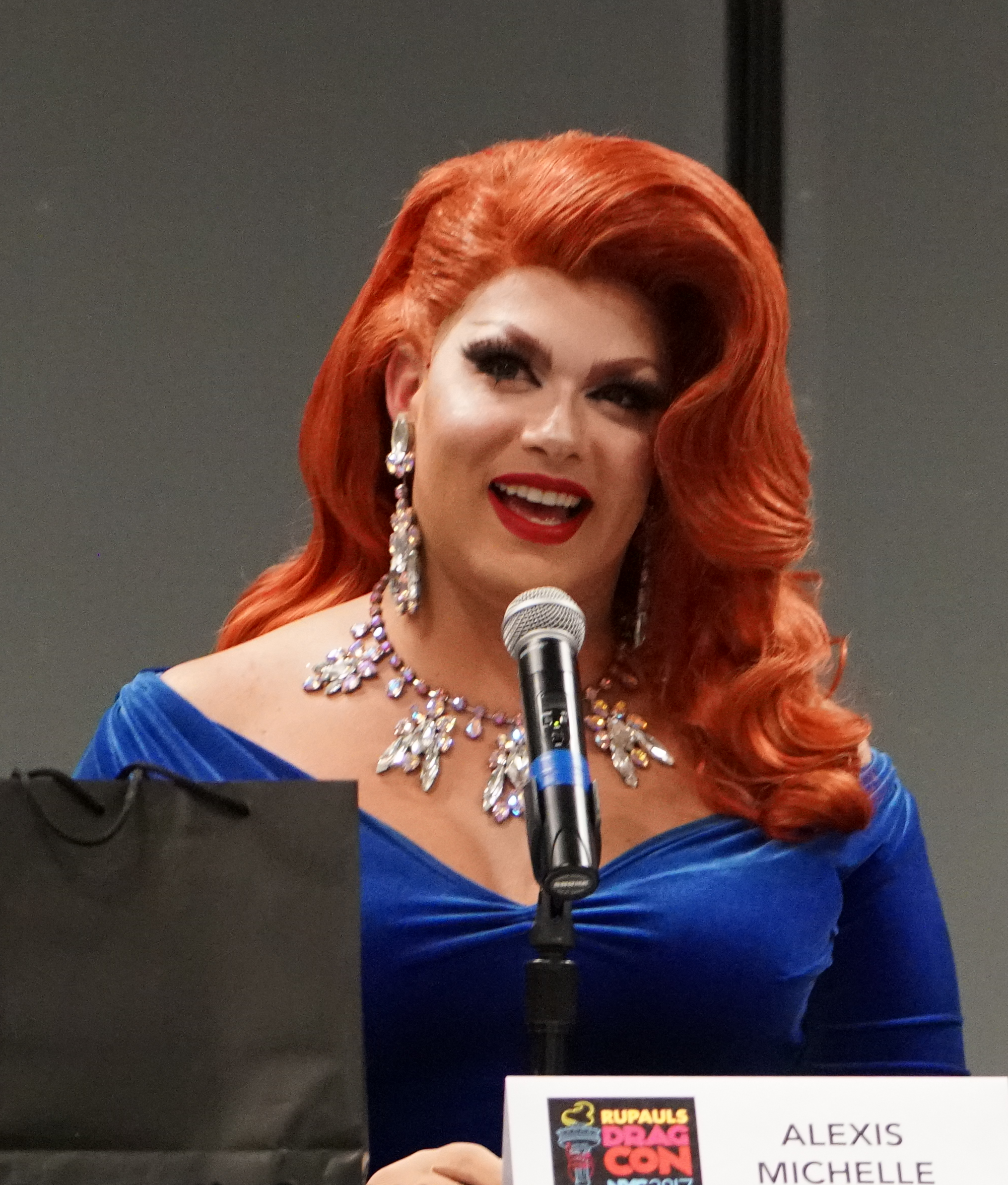
Alexis Michelle

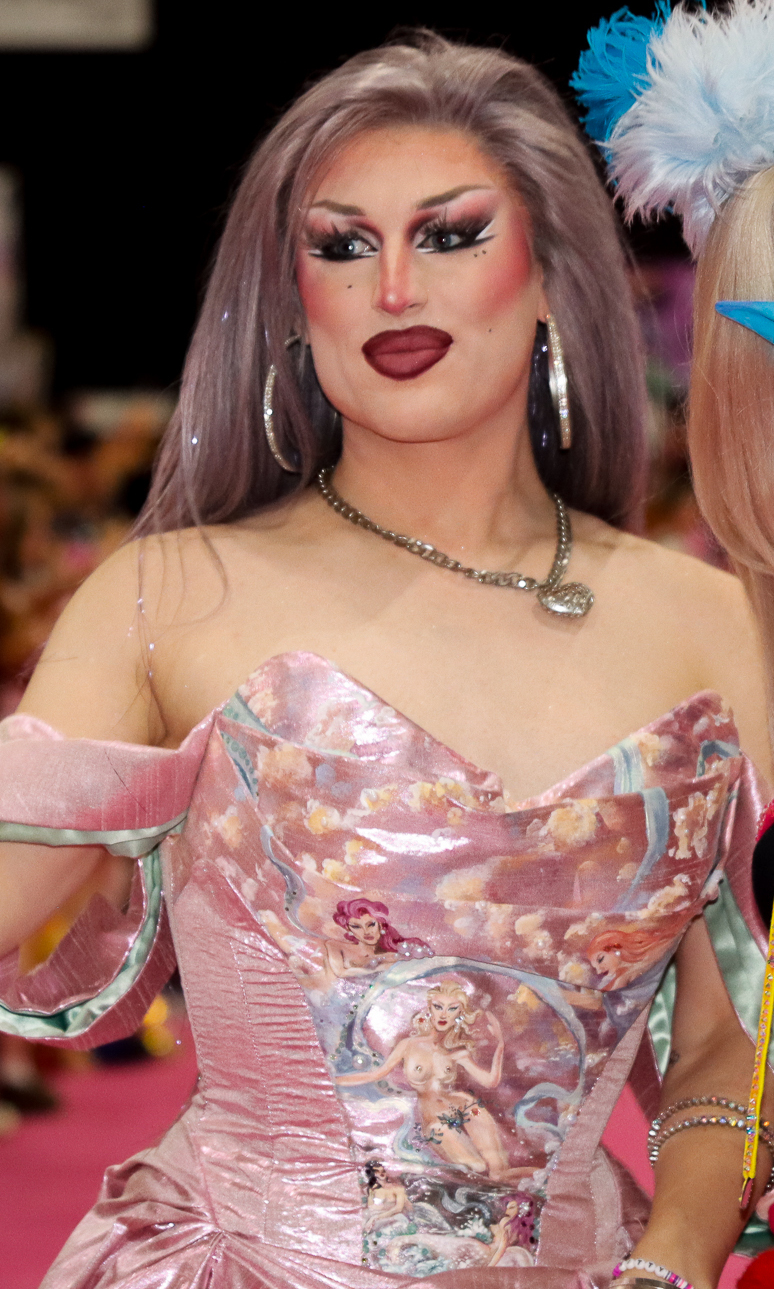
Amanda Tori Meating

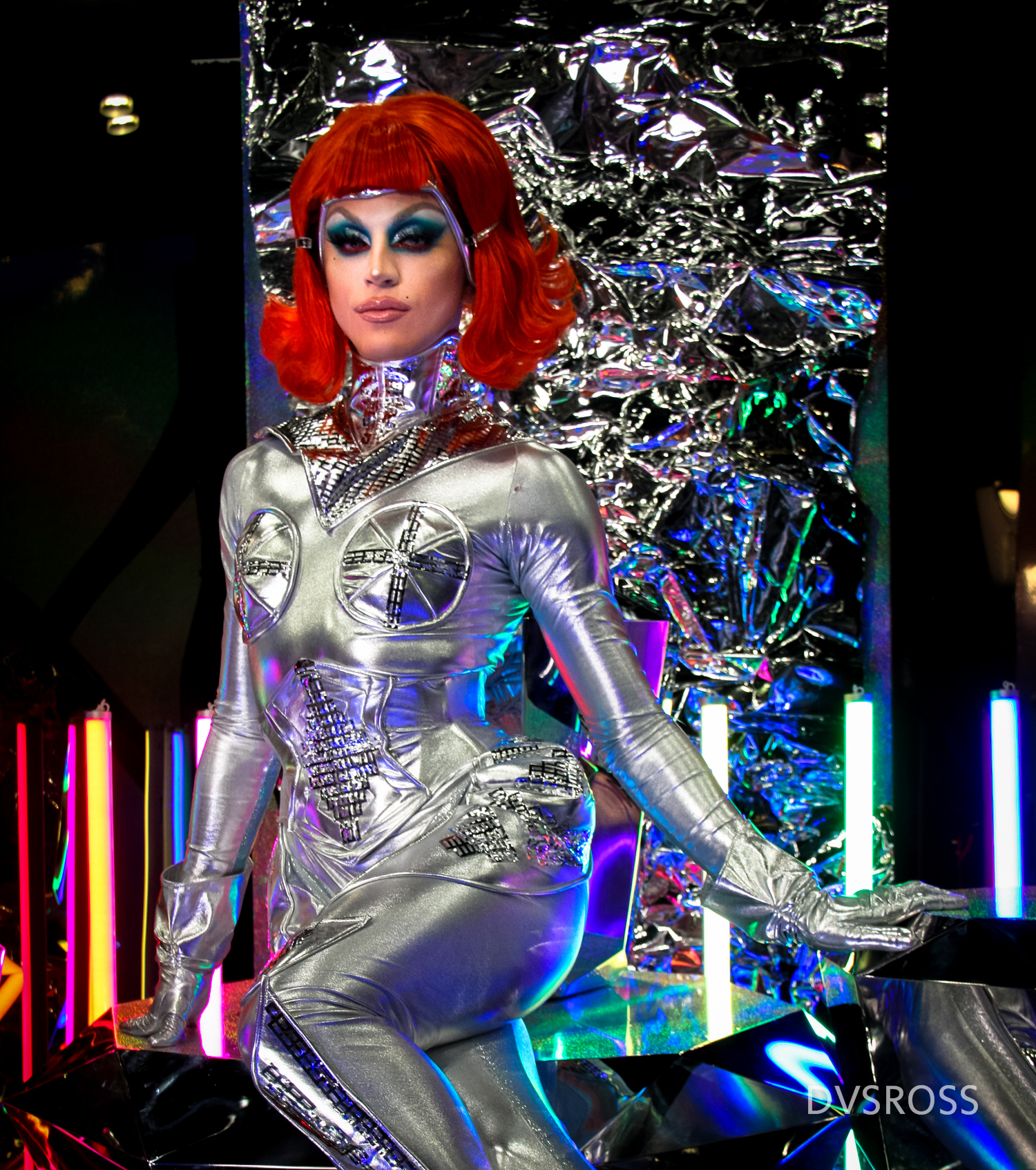
Aquaria

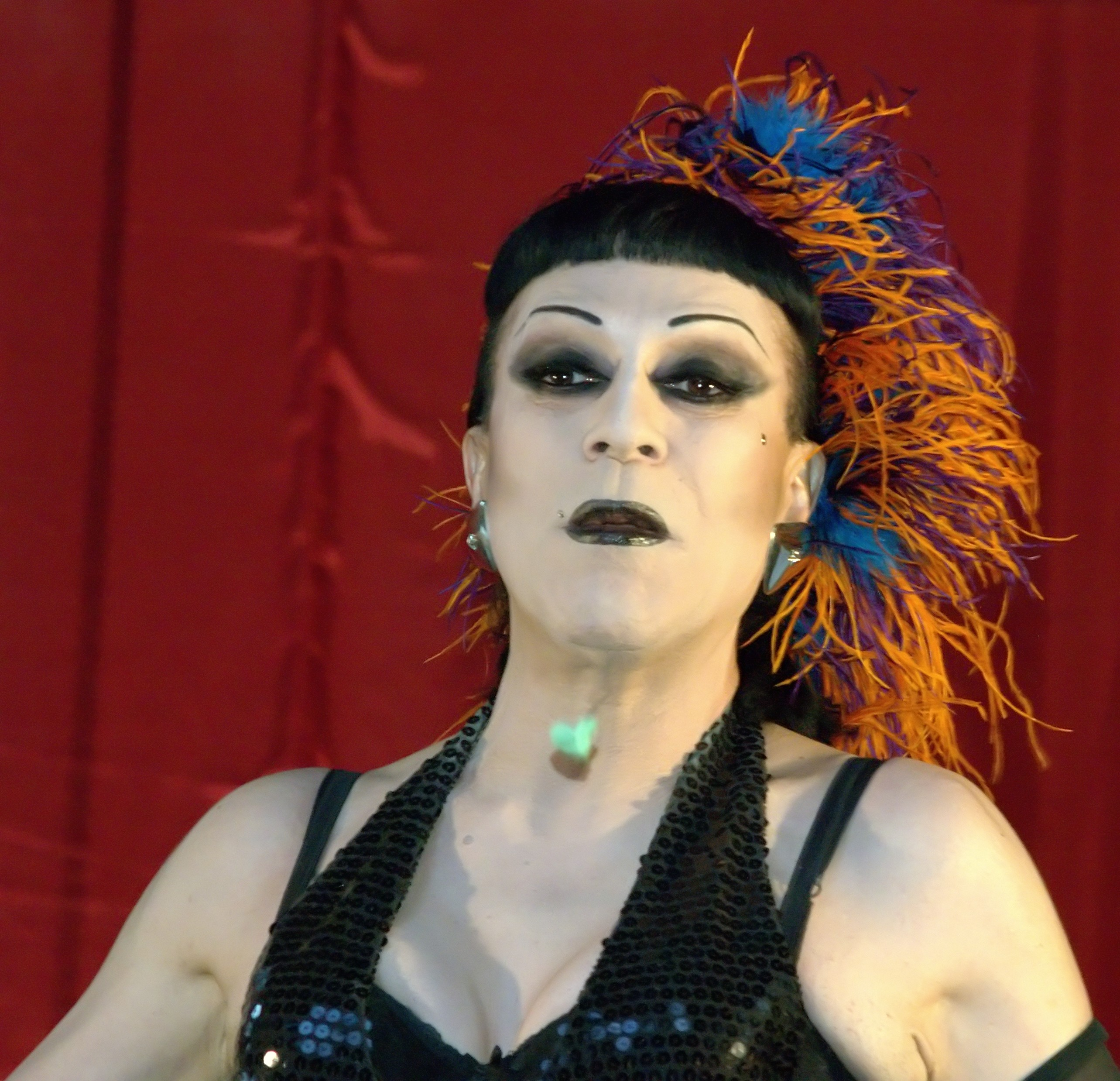
Joey Arias

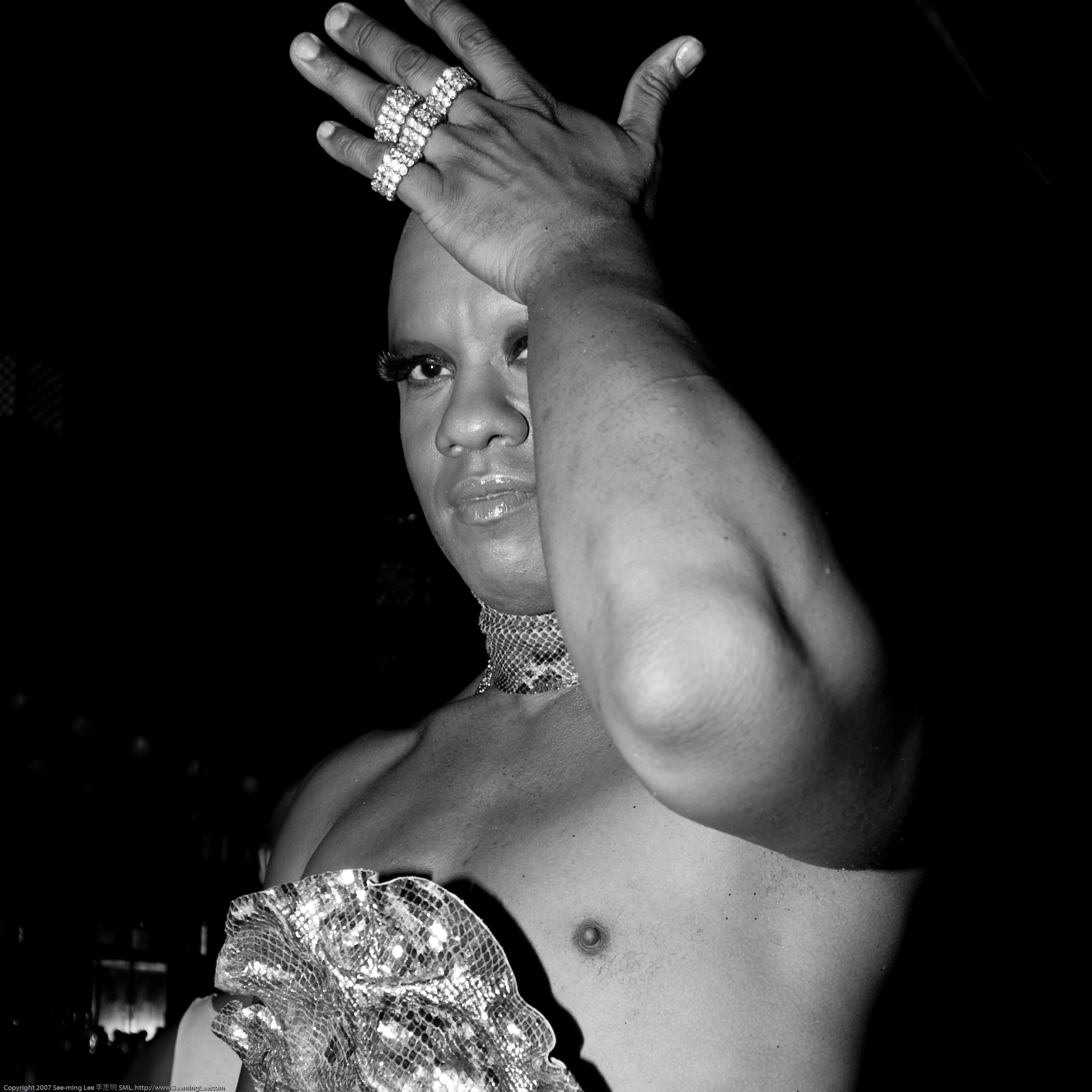
Kevin Aviance

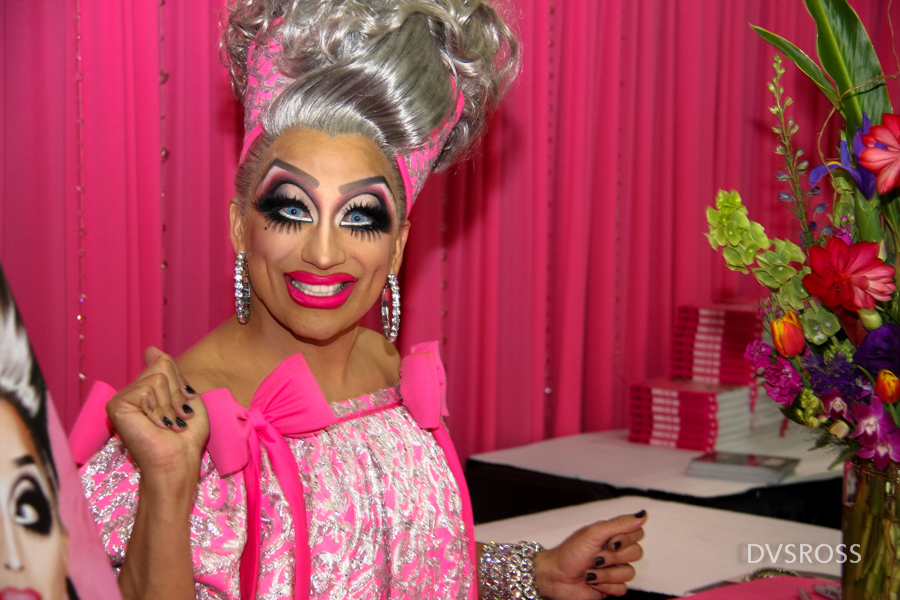
Bianca Del Rio

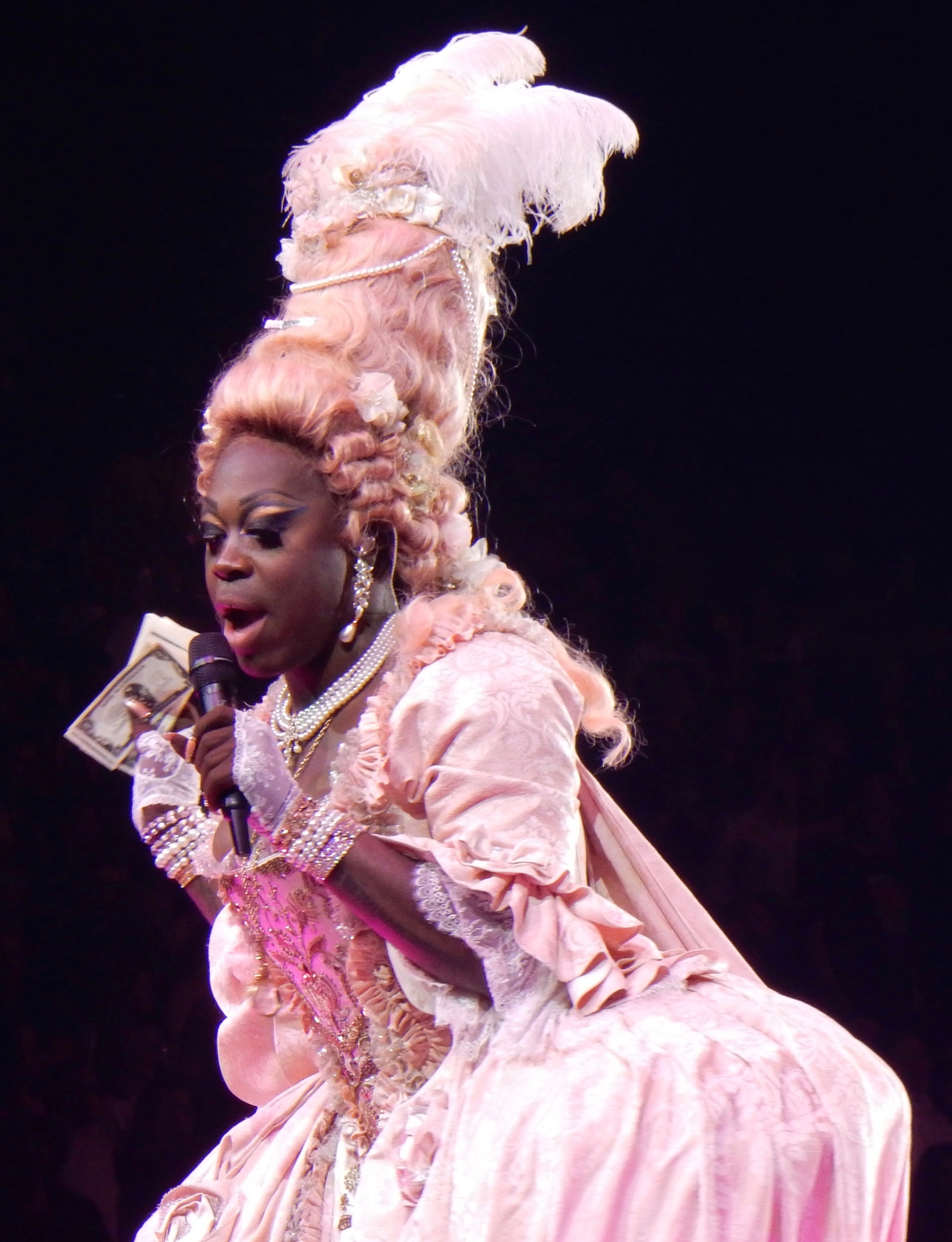
Bob the Drag Queen

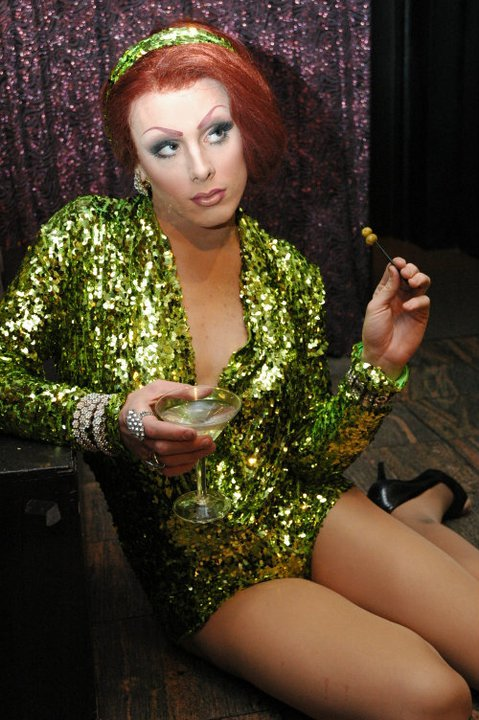
Dallas DuBois

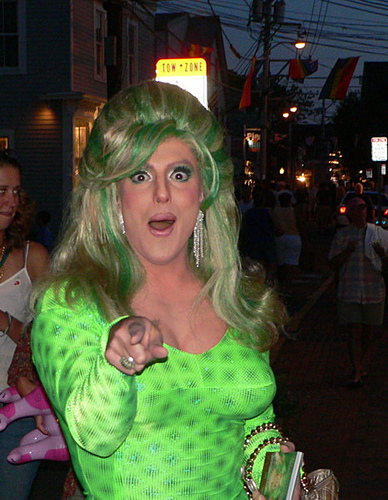
Hedda Lettuce

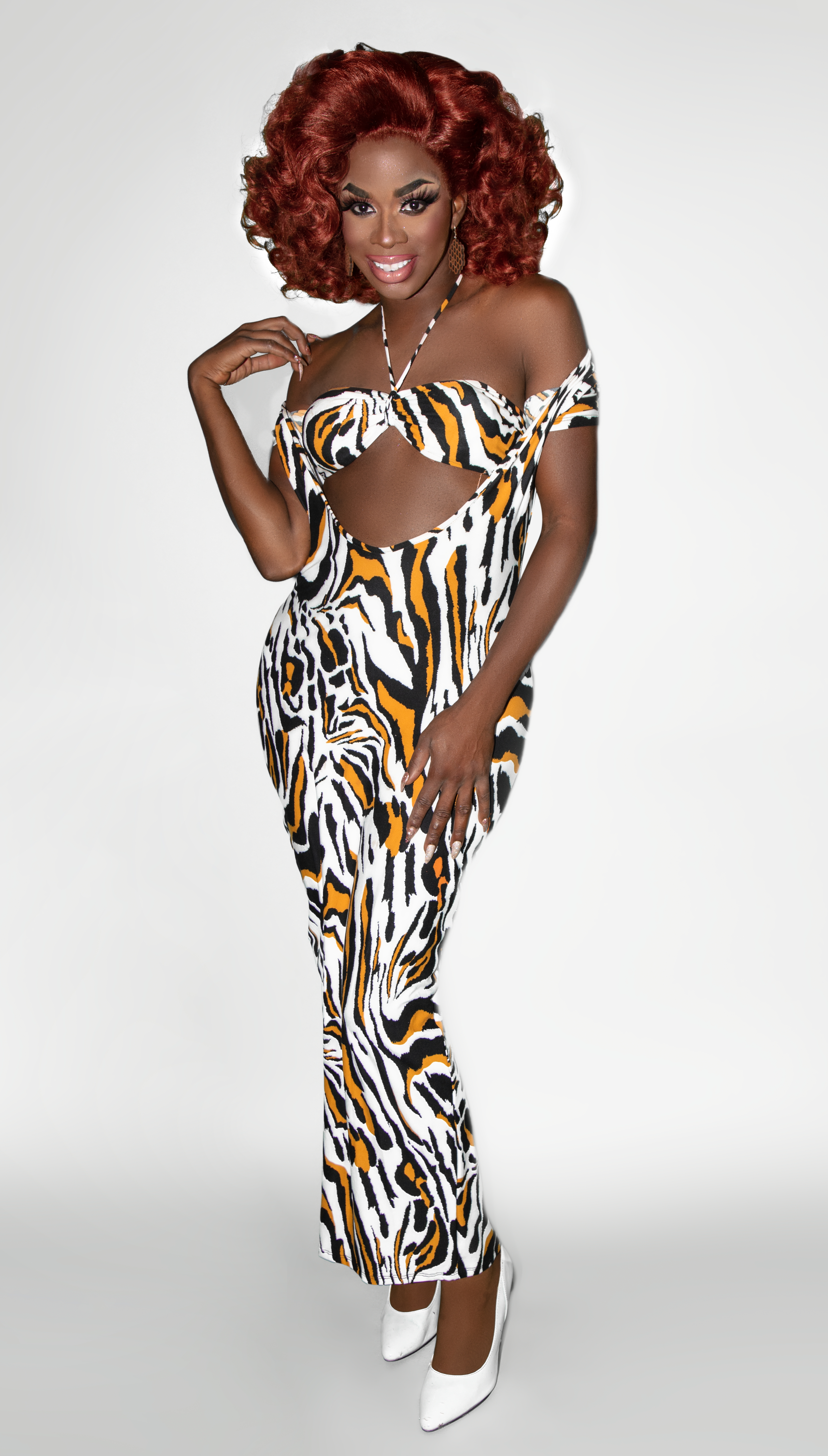
Honey Davenport

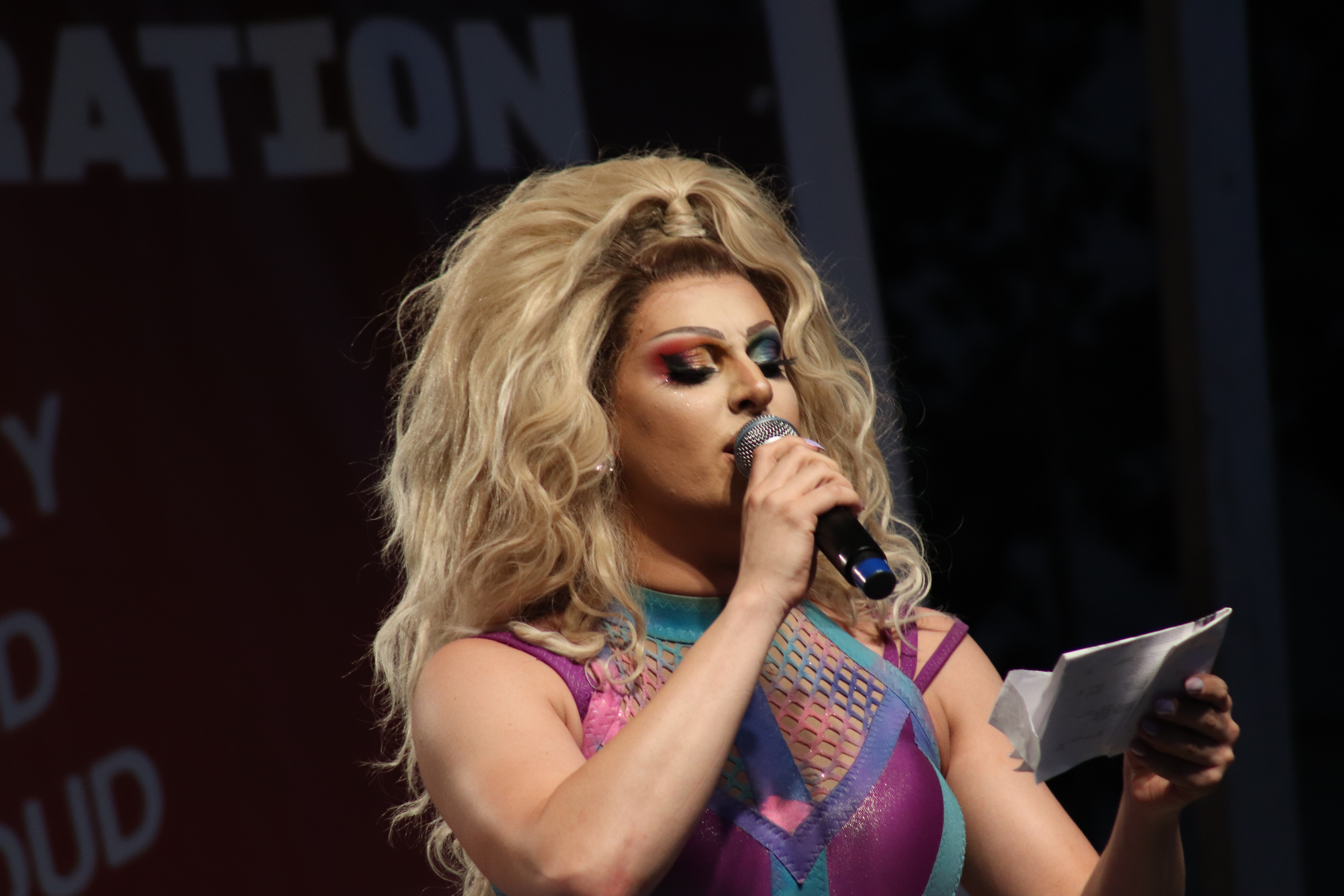
Jan Sport

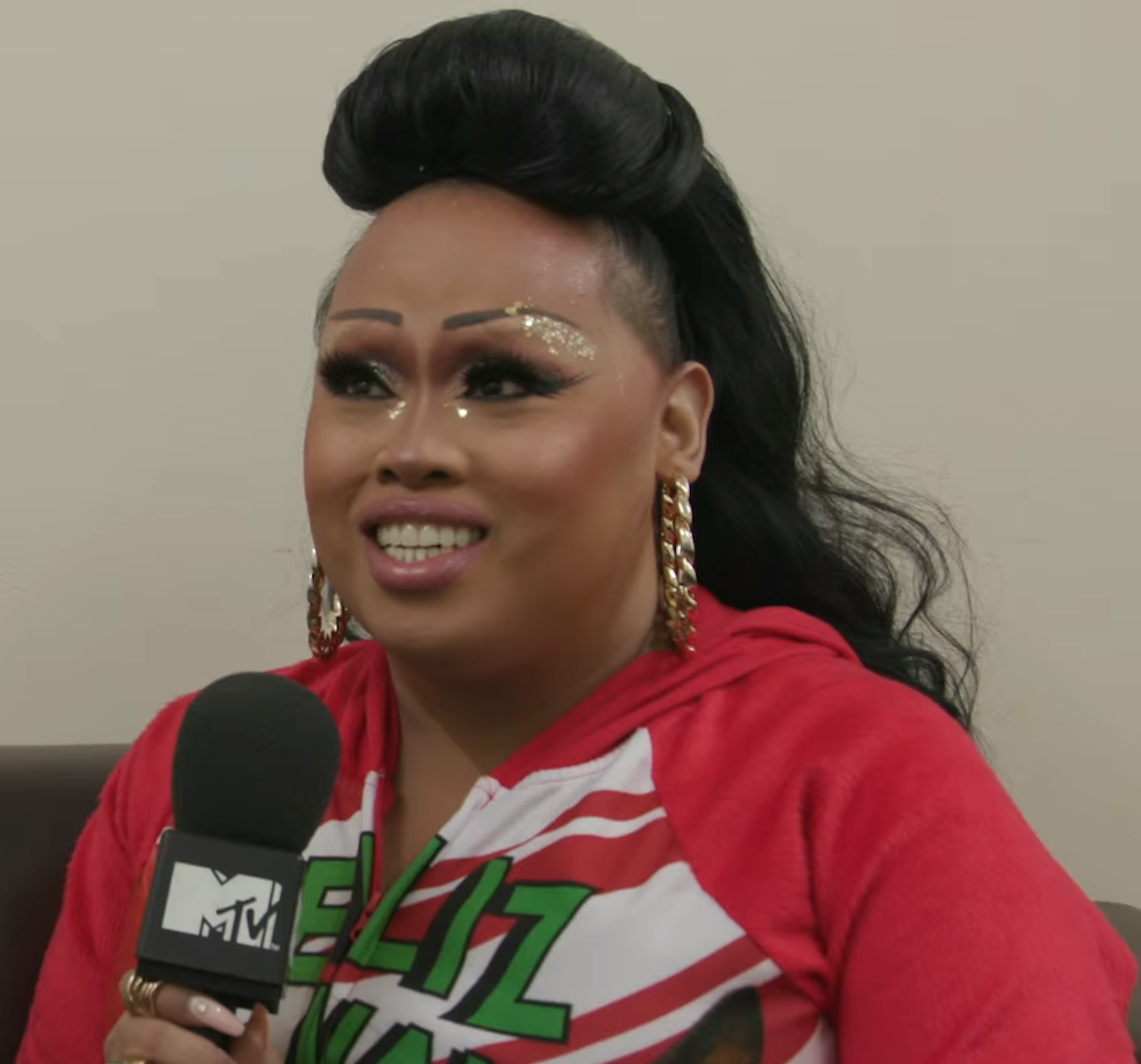
Jiggly Caliente

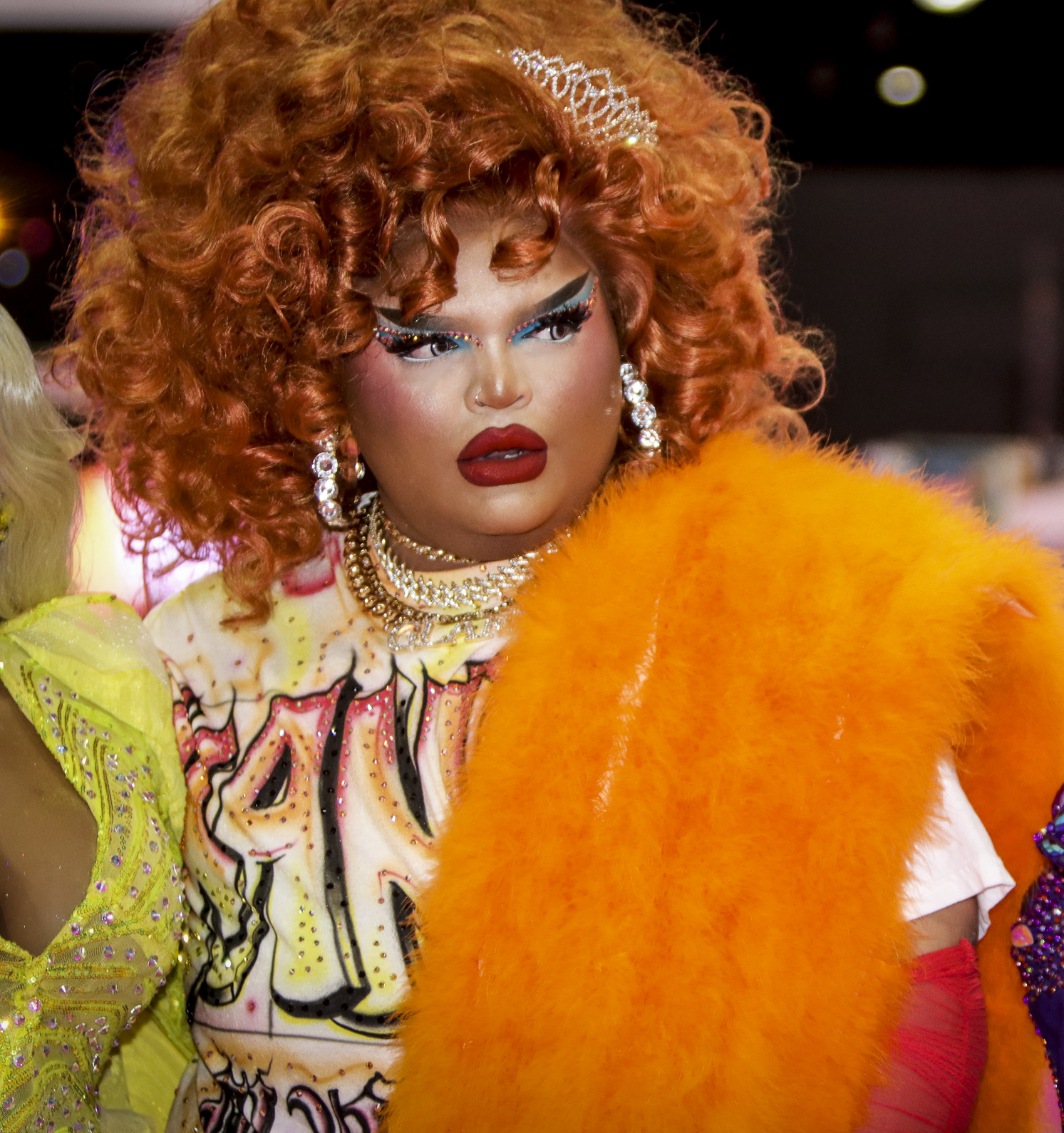
Kandy Muse

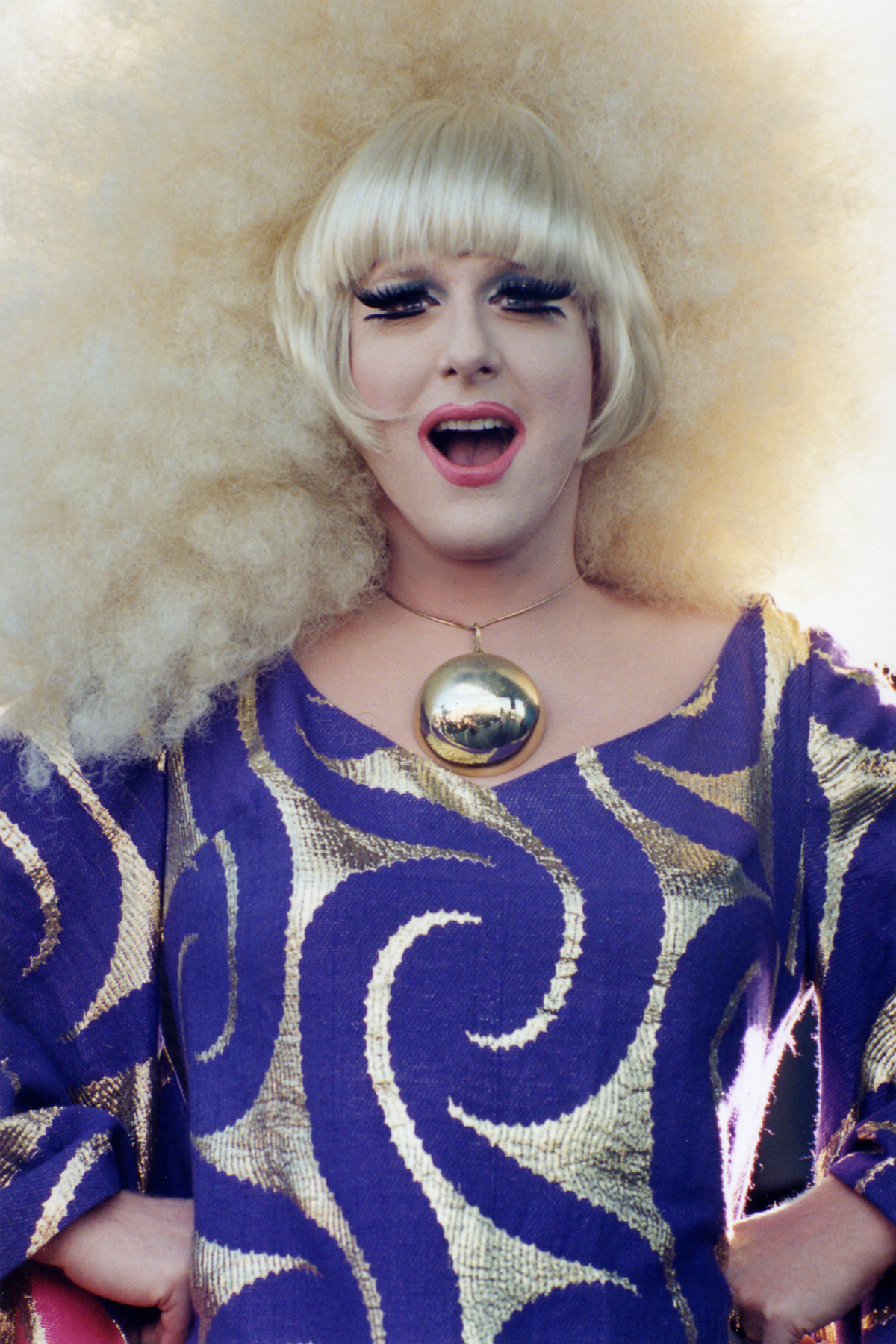
Lady Bunny

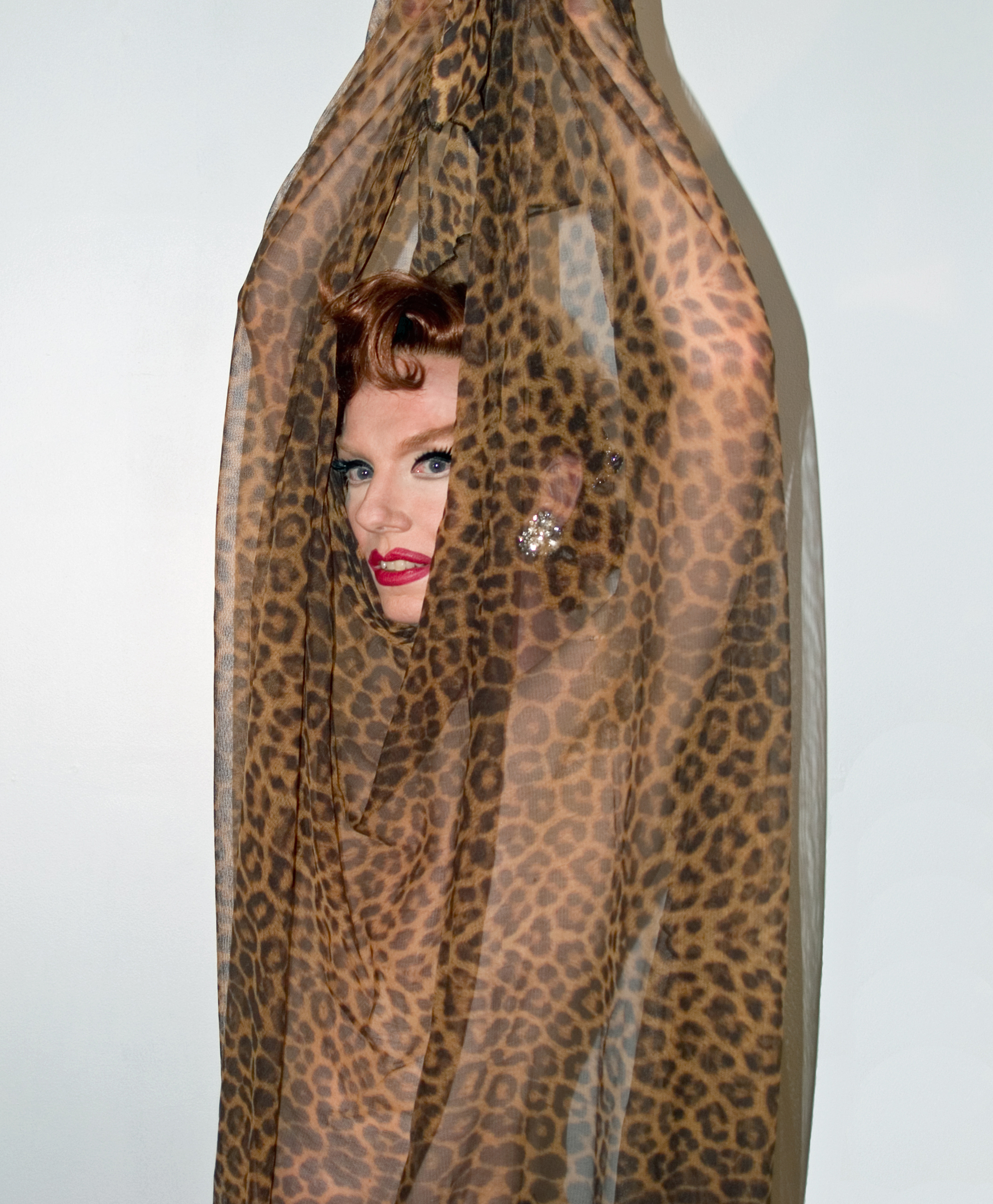
Lypsinka

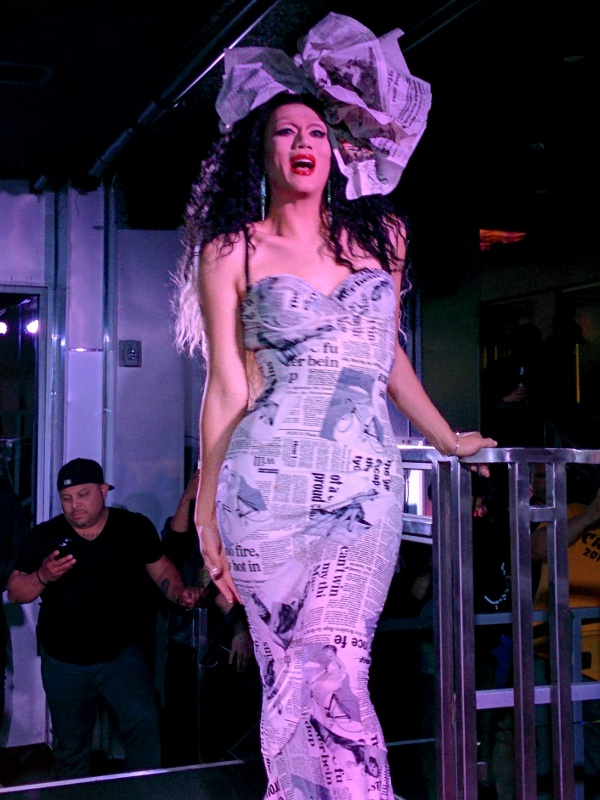
Manila Luzon

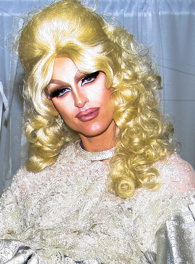
Milk

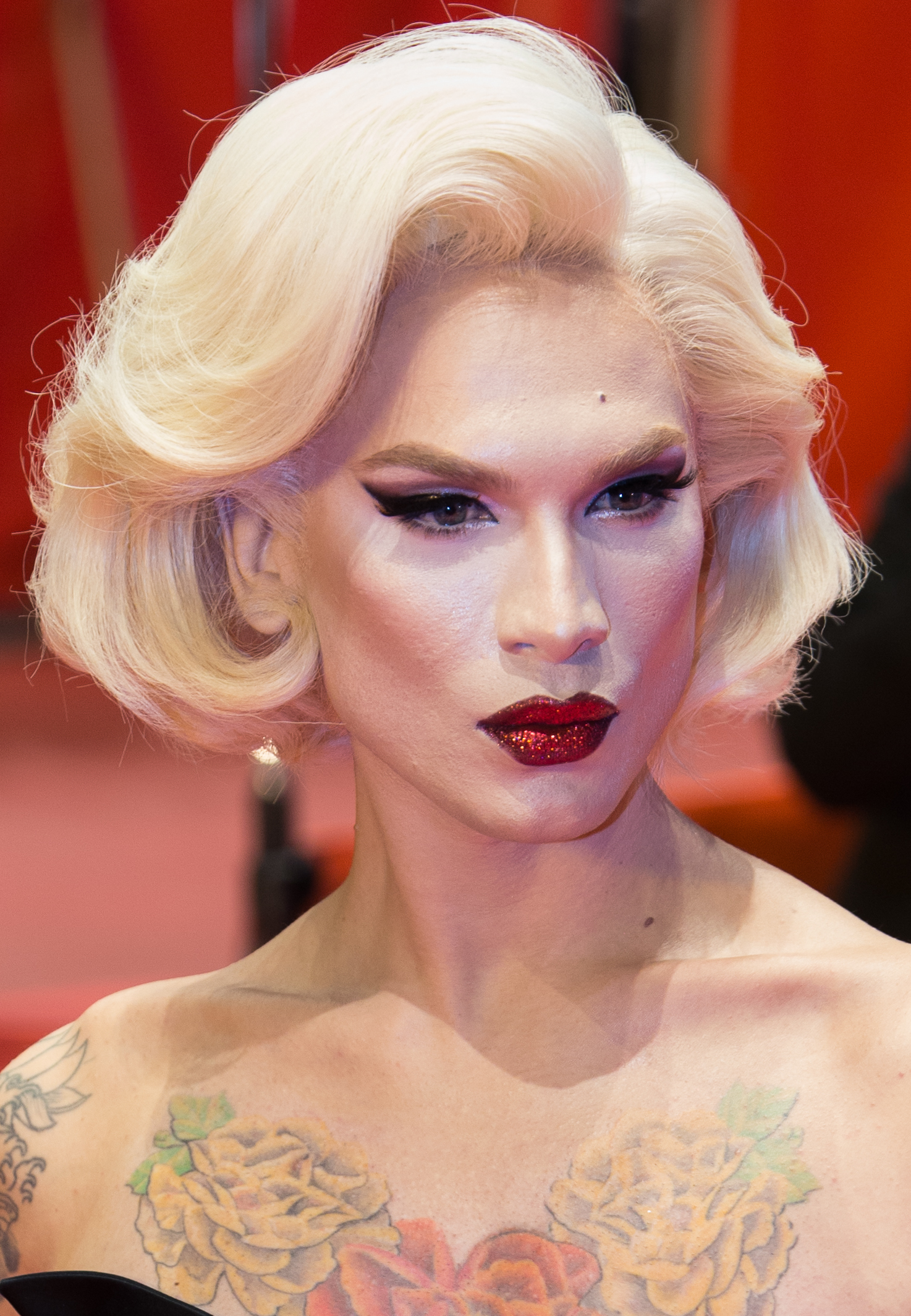
Miss Fame

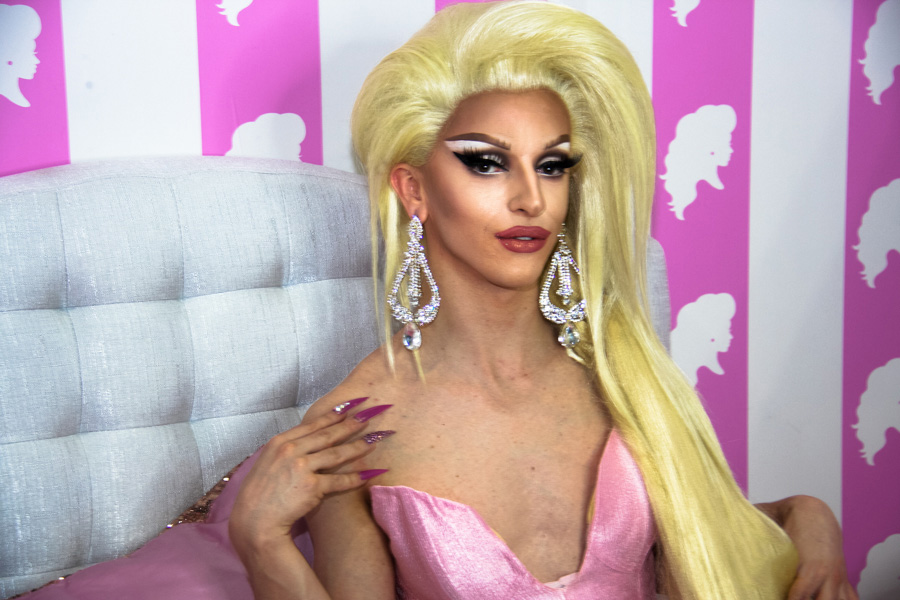
Miz Cracker

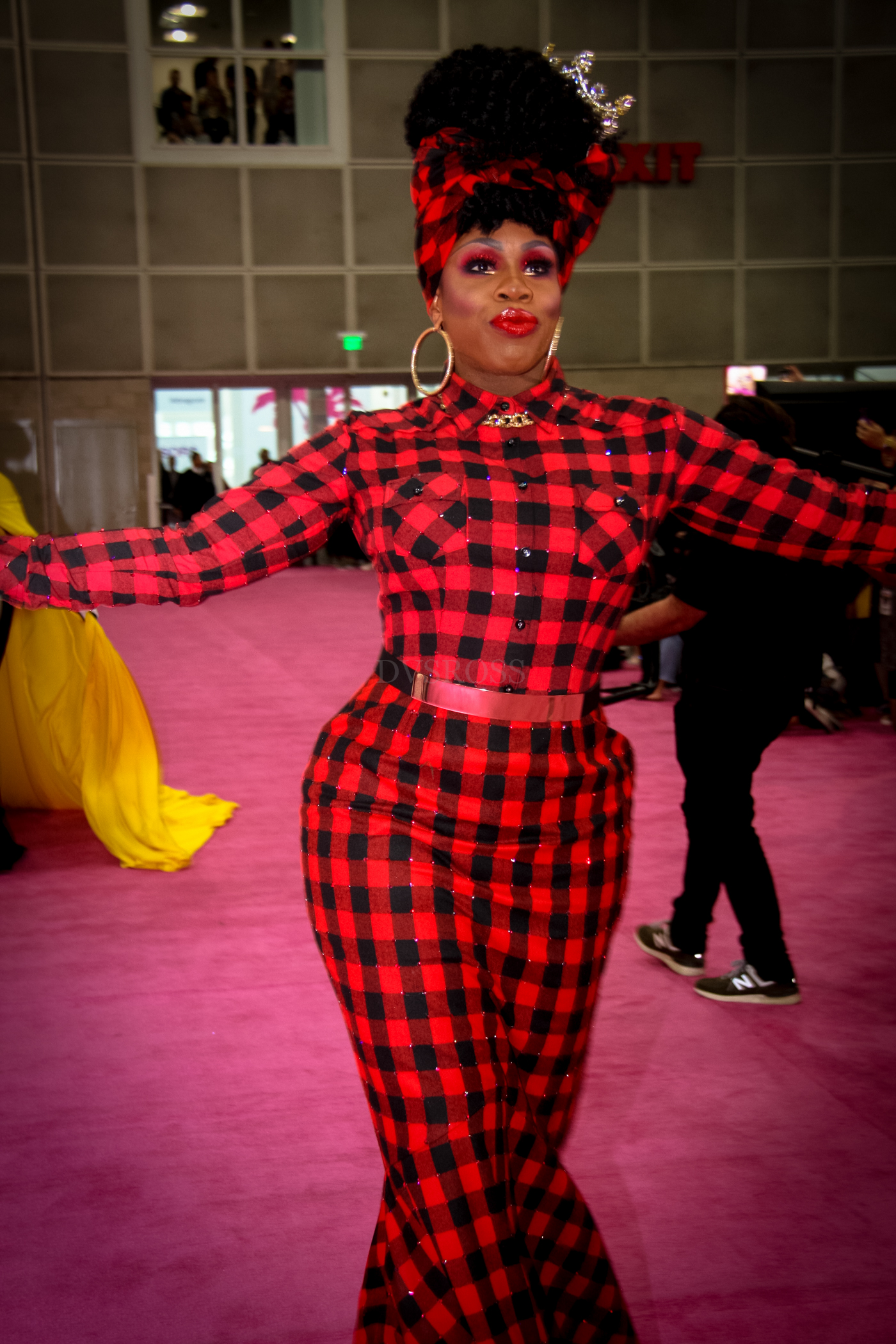
Monét X Change

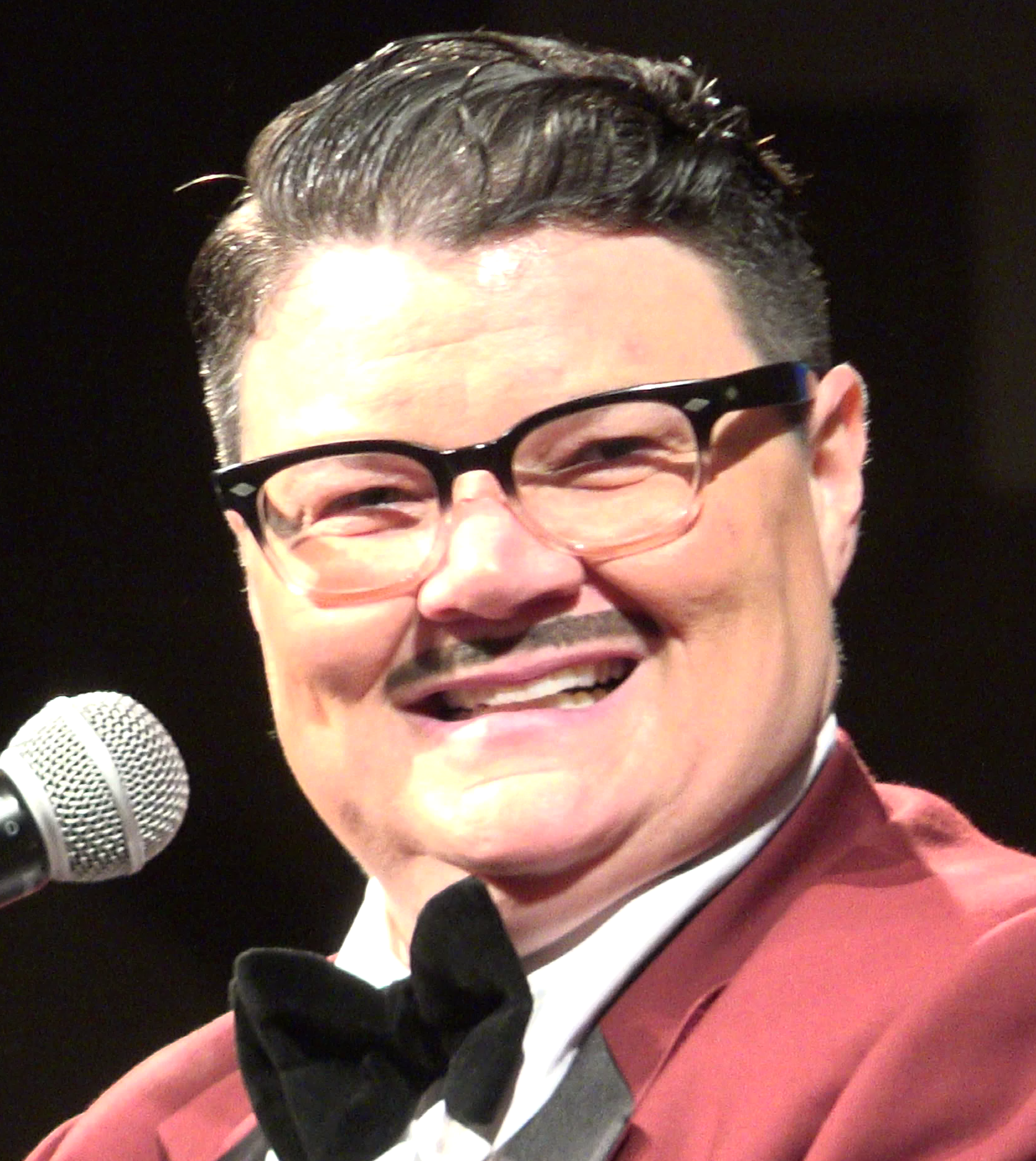
Murray Hill

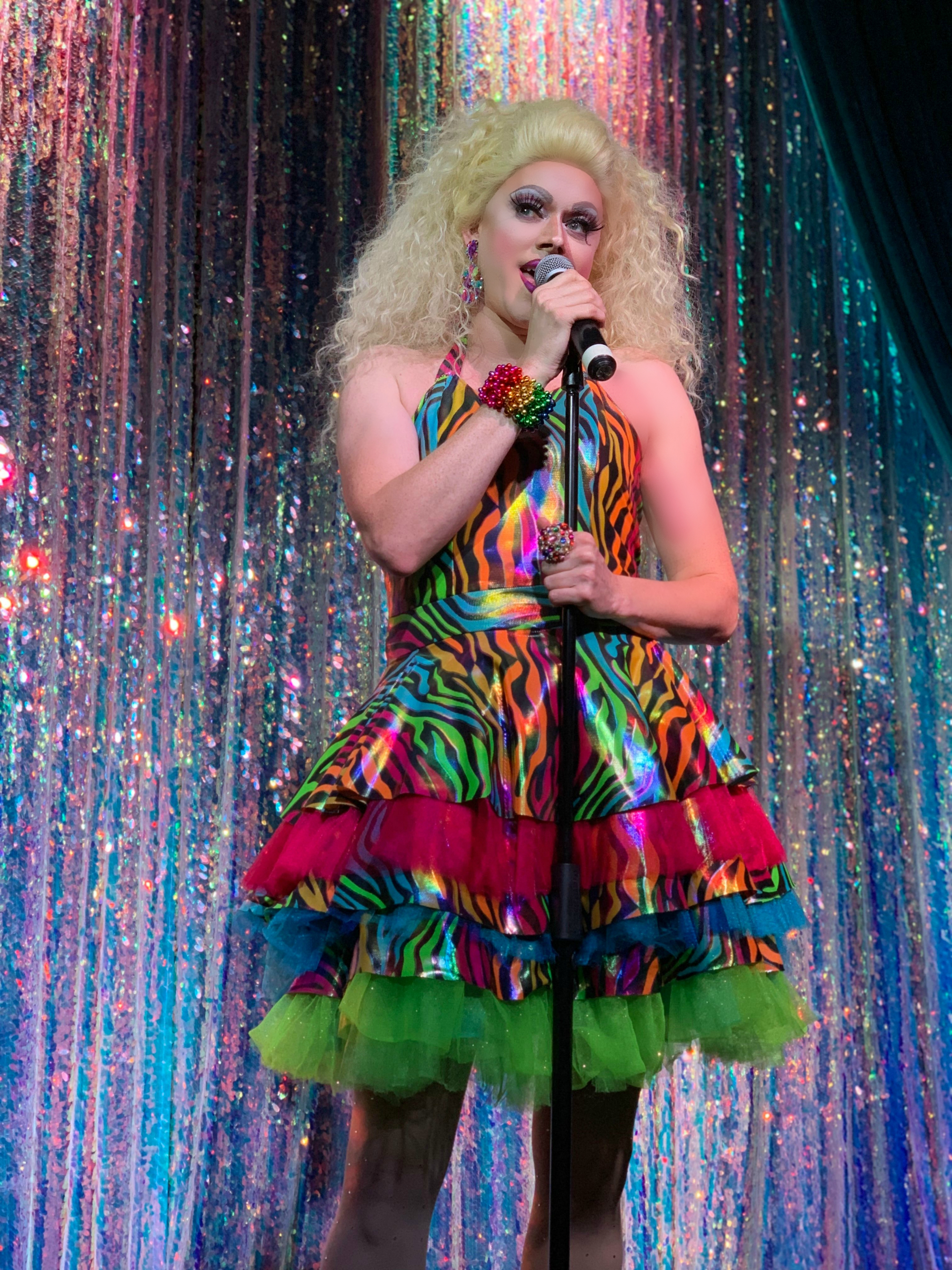
Paige Turner

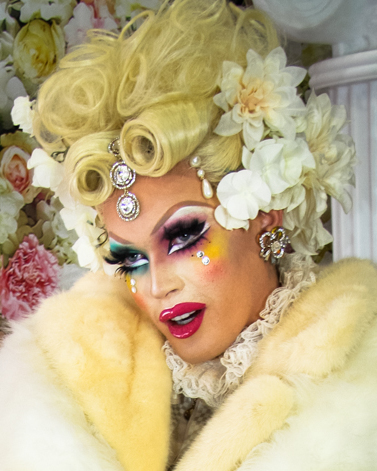
Pearl

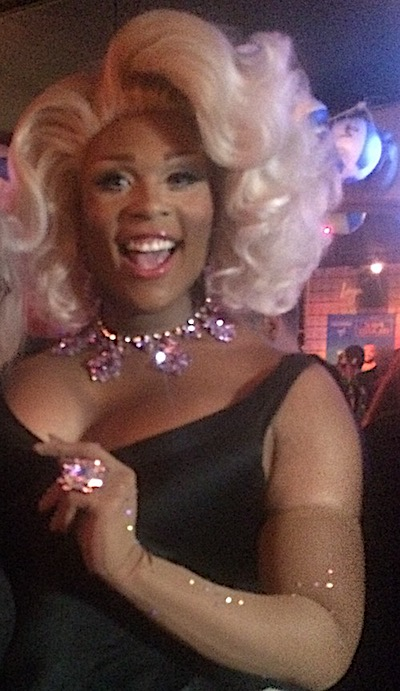
Peppermint

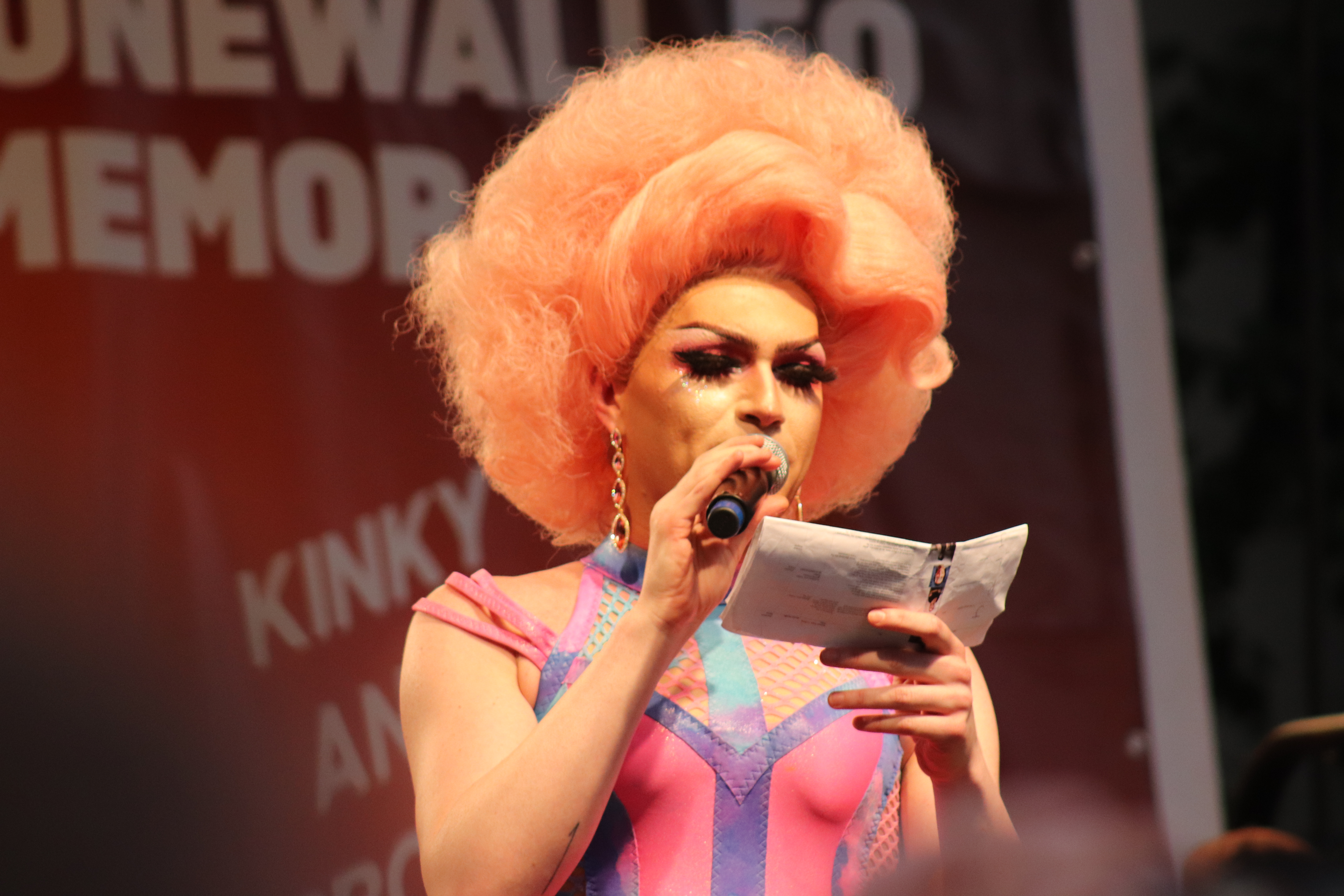
Rosé

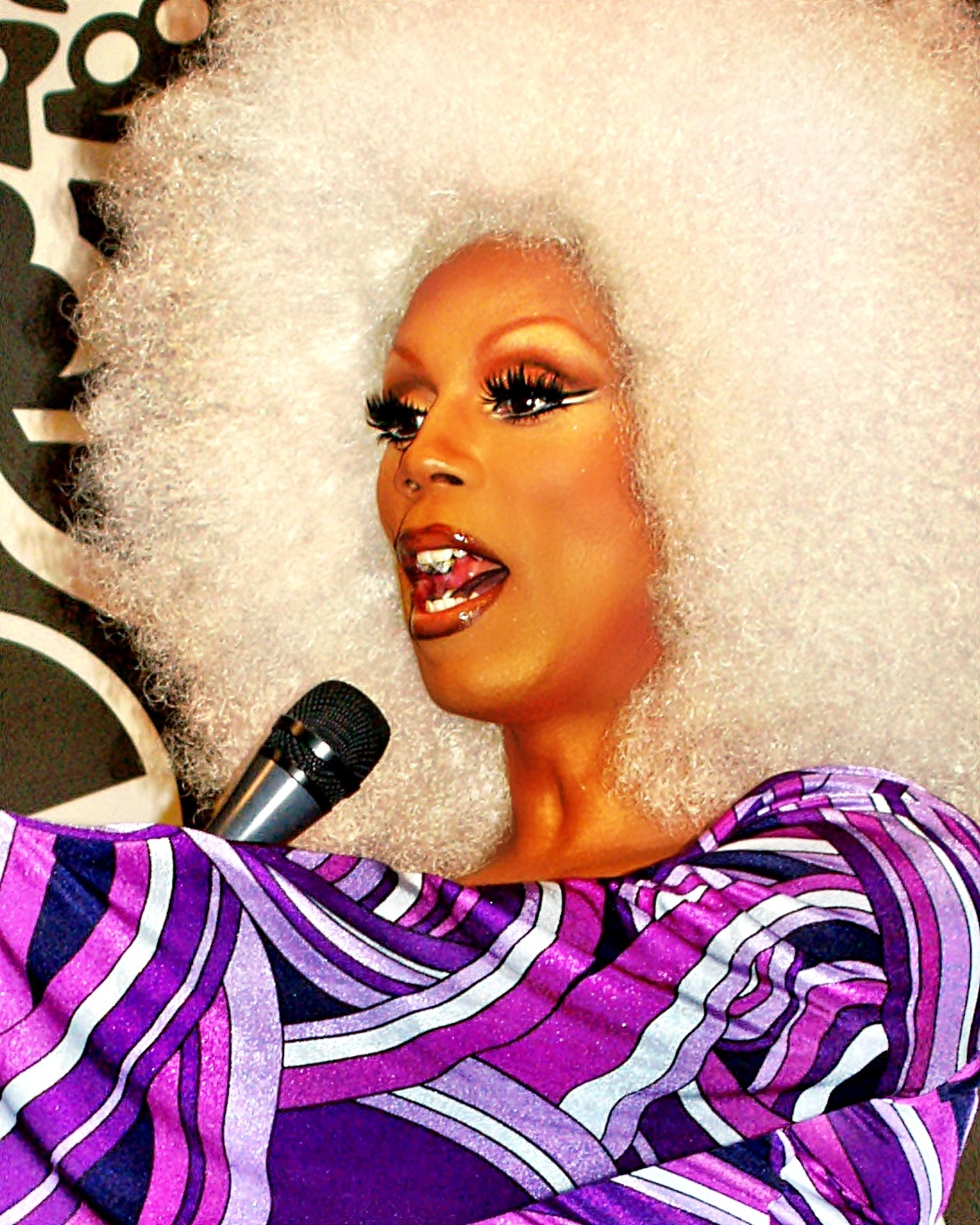
RuPaul

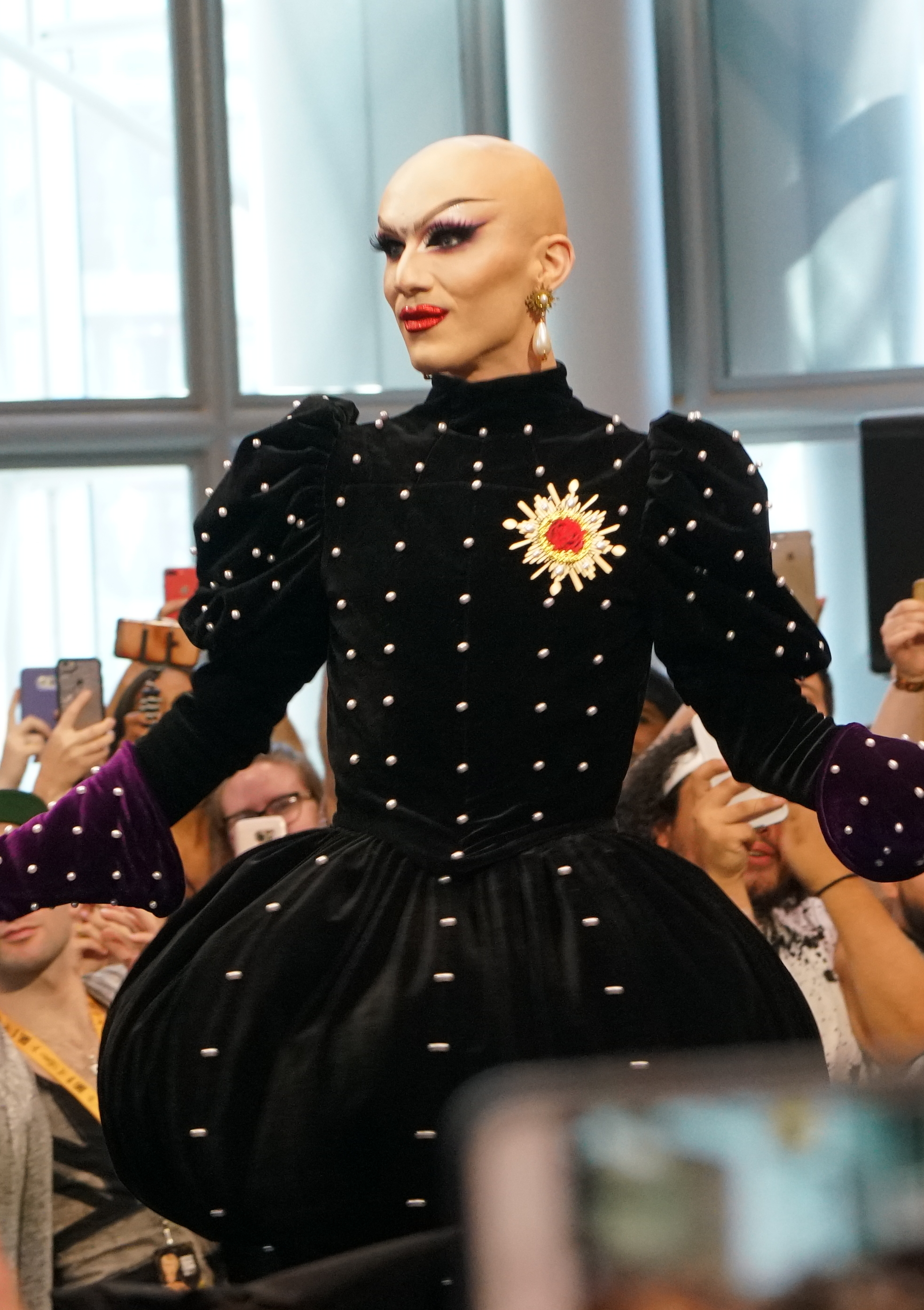
Sasha Velour

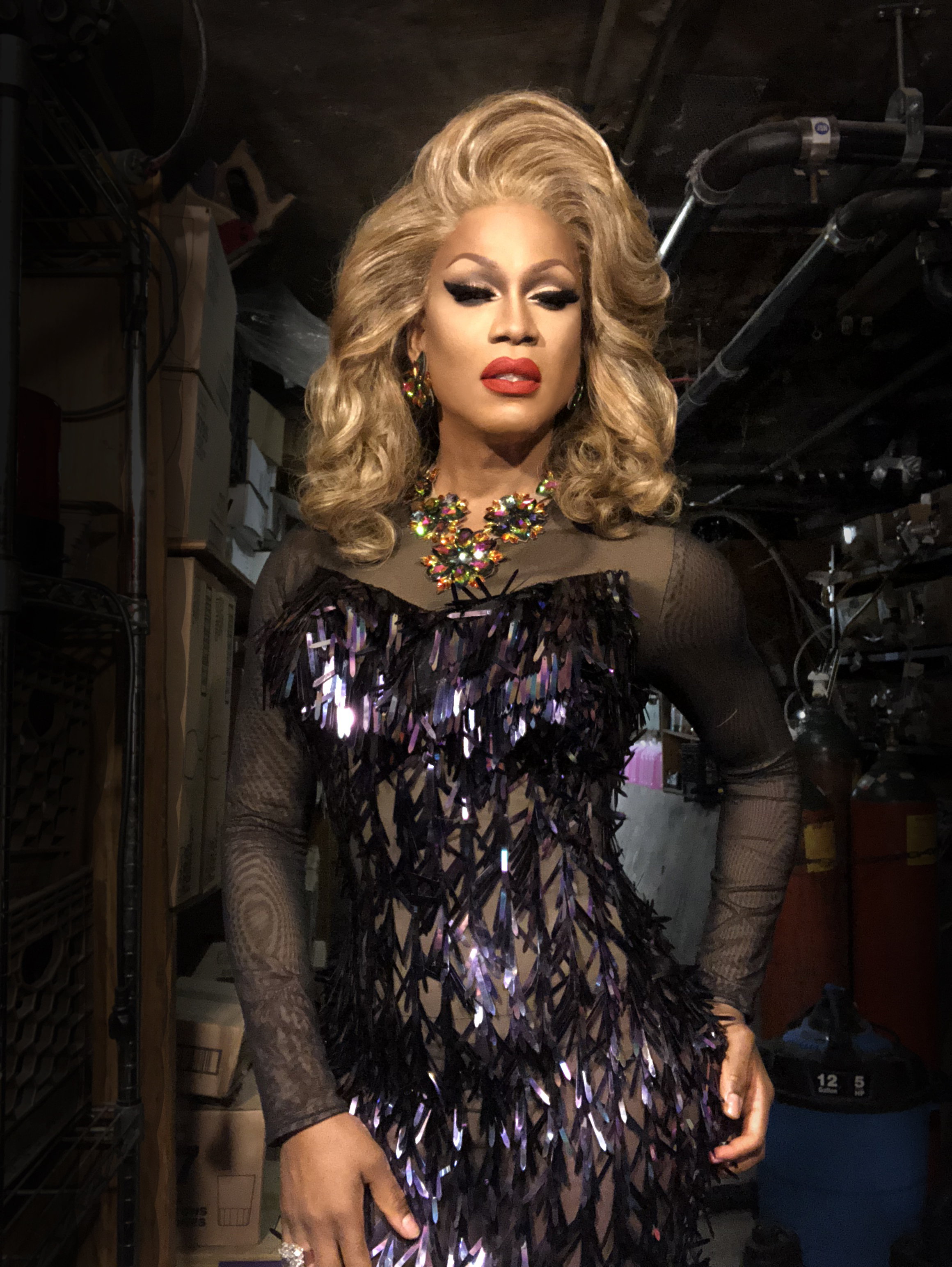
Shequida

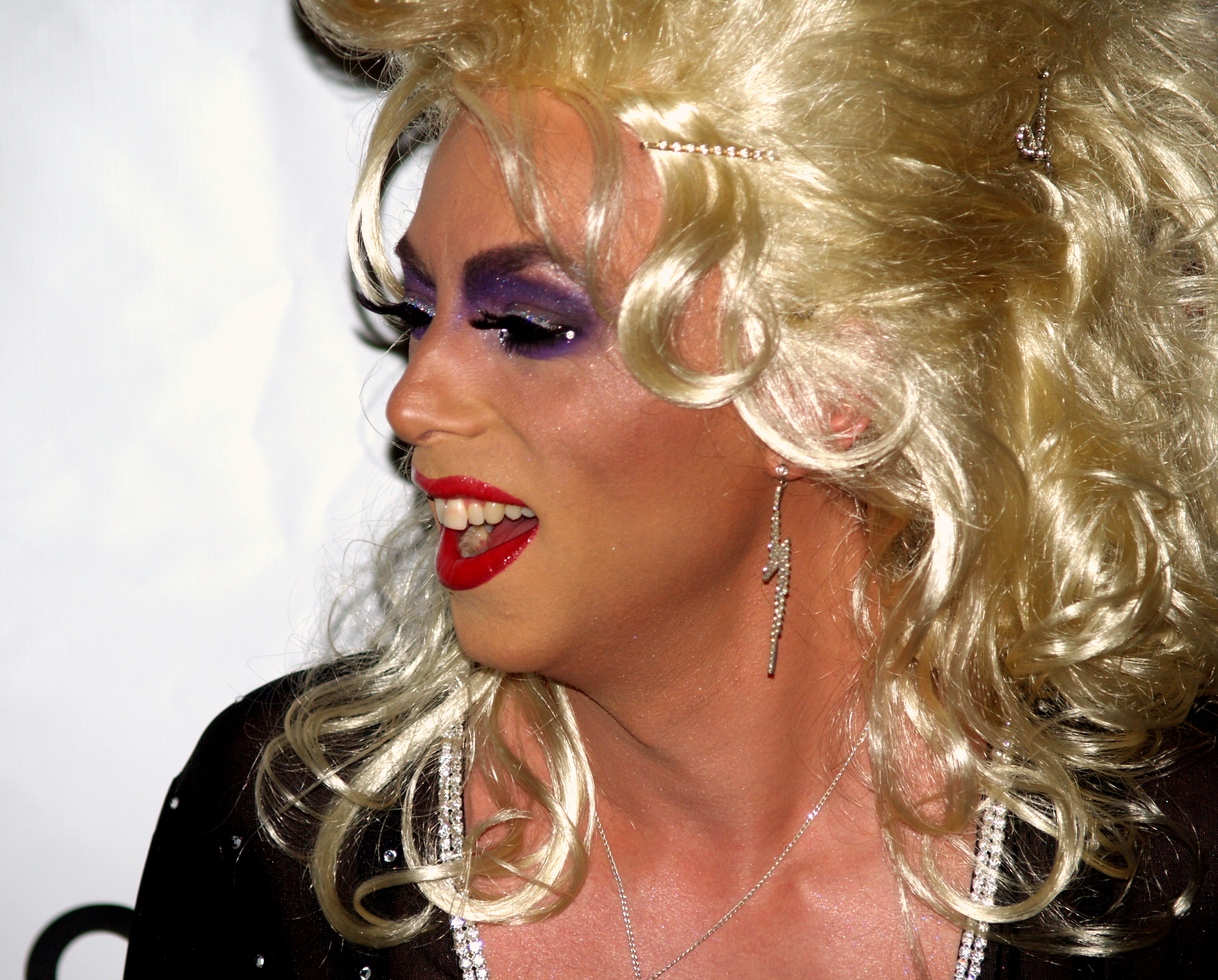
Sherry Vine

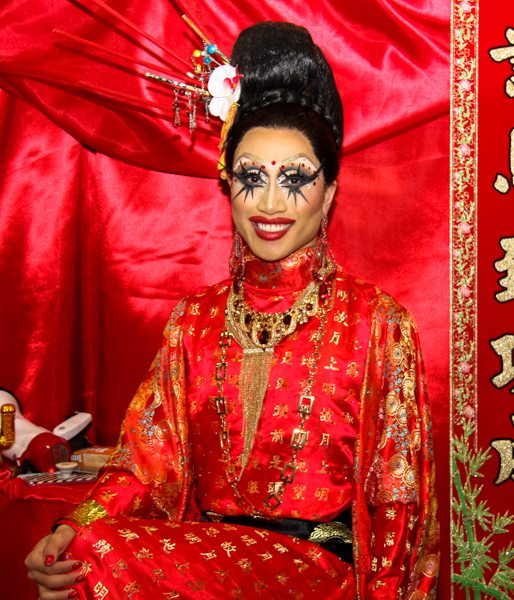
Yuhua Hamasaki
LGBTQ New Yorkers – Drag
- Acid Betty – drag queen (contestant on the eighth season of RuPaul's Drag Race and tenth season of RuPaul's Drag Race All Stars
- Aja – drag queen (contestant on the ninth season of RuPaul's Drag Race, the third Season of RuPaul's Drag Race All Stars and the tenth season of RuPaul's Drag Race All Stars) and rapper
- Alexis Michelle – singer and drag queen (contestant on the ninth season of RuPaul's Drag Race and the eighth season of RuPaul's Drag Race All Stars)
- Amanda Tori Meating – drag performer, and actor (contestant on the sixteenth of RuPaul's Drag Race)
- Aquaria – drag queen and performance artist (winner of the tenth season of RuPaul's Drag Race)
- Joey Arias – drag queen and performance artist
- Kevin Aviance – drag queen
- Bianca Del Rio – drag queen
- Blair St. Clair – drag queen and singer (contestant on the tenth season of RuPaul's Drag Race and the fifth season of RuPaul's Drag Race All Stars)
- Bob the Drag Queen – drag queen; performance artist (winner of the eighth season of RuPaul's Drag Race; host of We're Here and contestant on the third season of The Traitors; author
- Lee Brewster – late drag queen, homophile, transvestite activist, founder of Queens Liberation Front
- Brita Filter – drag queen (contestant on the twelfth season of RuPaul's Drag Race), actor, and star of Shade: Queens of NYC
- Dallas DuBois – former drag queen
- Dawn – drag performer (contestant on the sixteenth season of RuPaul's Drag Race)
- Dusty Ray Bottoms – drag performer (contestant on the tenth season of RuPaul's Drag Race)
- Hedda Lettuce – drag queen and singer
- Honey Davenport – activist, singer, and drag queen (contestant on the eleventh season of RuPaul's Drag Race)
- Ivy Winters – drag performer, sing, and actor (contestant and Miss Congeniality of the fifth season of RuPaul's Drag Race)
- Jackie Cox – drag queen (contestant on the twelfth season of RuPaul's Drag Race)
- Jan Sport – drag queen (contestant on the twelfth season of RuPaul's Drag Race and the sixth season of RuPaul's Drag Race All Stars)
- Jasmine Kennedie – drag queen (contestant on the fourteenth season of RuPaul's Drag Race)
- Jax – drag queen and dancer (contestant on the fifteenth season of RuPaul's Drag Race)
- Jiggly Caliente – late transgender singer, actress, activist, and drag queen (contestant on the fourth season of RuPaul's Drag Race and the sixth season RuPaul's Drag Race All Stars and judge of Drag Race Philippines)
- Kandy Muse – drag queen, contestant on the thirteenth season of RuPaul's Drag Race and eighth season of RuPaul's Drag Race All Stars
- Lady Bunny – drag queen and founder Wigstock event
- Lagoona Bloo – drag queen and singer
- Lana Ja'Rae – drag performer (contestant on the seventeenth season of RuPaul's Drag Race)
- Lemon – drag queen (contestant on the first season of Canada's Drag Race the first series of RuPaul's Drag Race: UK vs. the World and winner of second season of Canada's Drag Race: Canada vs. the World)
- Lypsinka – drag queen, writer, musician, and performance artist
- Manila Luzon – drag queen (contestant on the third season of RuPaul's Drag Race the first season, the fourth season of RuPaul's Drag Race All Starsand the host and judge of Drag Den)
- Marcia Marcia Marcia – drag performer (contestant on the fifteenth season of RuPaul's Drag Race)
- Megami – drag queen and cosplayer (contestant on the sixteenth season RuPaul's Drag Race)
- Milan – drag queen (contestant on the fourth season of RuPaul's Drag Race)
- Milk – drag performer (contestant on the sixth season of RuPaul's Drag Race and the third season of RuPaul's Drag Race All Stars) and fashion model
- Mimi Imfurst – drag performer (contestant on the third season of RuPaul's Drag Race and first season of RuPaul's Drag Race All Stars)
- Miss Fame – drag queen (contestant on the seventh season of RuPaul's Drag Race)
- Miz Cracker – drag queen (contestant on the tenth season of RuPaul's Drag Race and the fifth season of RuPaul's Drag Race All Stars)
- Monét X Change – drag queen (contestant and Miss Congenialty of the tenth season of RuPaul's Drag Race and winner of the fourth season of RuPaul's Drag Race All Stars and the seventh season of RuPaul's Drag Race All Stars)
- Murray Hill – drag king and performance artist
- Nicky Doll – drag queen (contestant on the twelfth season of RuPaul's Drag Race and host of Drag Race France)
- Nymphia Wind – drag queen (winner of the sixteenth season of RuPaul's Drag Race)
- Olivia Lux – drag performer (contestant on the thirteenth season of RuPaul's Drag Race and the tenth season of RuPaul's Drag Race All Stars)
- Paige Turner – drag performer and star of Shade: Queens of NYC
- Pearl – drag queen (contestant on the seventh season of RuPaul's Drag Race)
- Peppermint – drag queen (contestant on the ninth season of RuPaul's Drag Race) star of Head Over Heels judge of Call Me Mother and contestant on the second season of The Traitors (American TV series)
- Phi Phi O'Hara – former drag queen (contestant on the fourth season of RuPaul's Drag Race and the second season of RuPaul's Drag Race All Stars)
- Plasma – drag performer (contestant on the sixteenth season of RuPaul's Drag Race)
- Rosé – drag queen, contestant on the thirteenth season of RuPaul's Drag Race
- RuPaul – drag queen and star of the RuPaul's Drag Race series
- Sahara Davenport – late singer and drag queen (contestant on the second season of RuPaul's Drag Race)
- Sasha Velour – drag performer (winner of the ninth season of RuPaul's Drag Race and host of We're Here)
- Scarlet Envy – drag queen (contestant on the eleventh season of RuPaul's Drag Race the sixth season of RuPaul's Drag Race All Stars and the series 2 of RuPaul's Drag Race: UK vs. the World)
- Shequida – drag artist, writer, and opera singer
- Sherry Pie – drag performer (contestant on the twelfth season of RuPaul's Drag Race)
- Sherry Vine – drag queen and musician
- Shuga Cain – drag queen (contestant on the eleventh season of RuPaul's Drag Race)
- Suzie Toot – drag performer (contestant on the seventeenth season of RuPaul's Drag Race)
- Thorgy Thor – drag queen (contestant on the eighth season of RuPaul's Drag Race and the third season of RuPaul's Drag Race All Stars)
- Tina Burner – drag queen (contestant on the thirteenth season of RuPaul's Drag Race, and the tenth season of RuPaul's Drag Race All Stars and star of Shade: Queens of NYC)
- Vivacious – drag queen (contestant on the sixth season of RuPaul's Drag Race)
- Vivienne Pinay – drag performer (contestant on the fifth season of RuPaul's Drag Race)
- Xunami Muse – drag performer (contestant and Miss Congeniality on the sixteenth season of RuPaul's Drag Race)
- Yuhua Hamasaki – drag queen (contestant on the tenth season of RuPaul's Drag Race, and on Drag Race Philippines: Slaysian Royale)

== See also ==
- LGBTQ culture in New York City
- List of LGBTQ people from New York City
- NYC Pride March
- RuPaul's DragCon NYC
- Transgender culture in New York City
- Wigstock
