= Shequida =

American musician

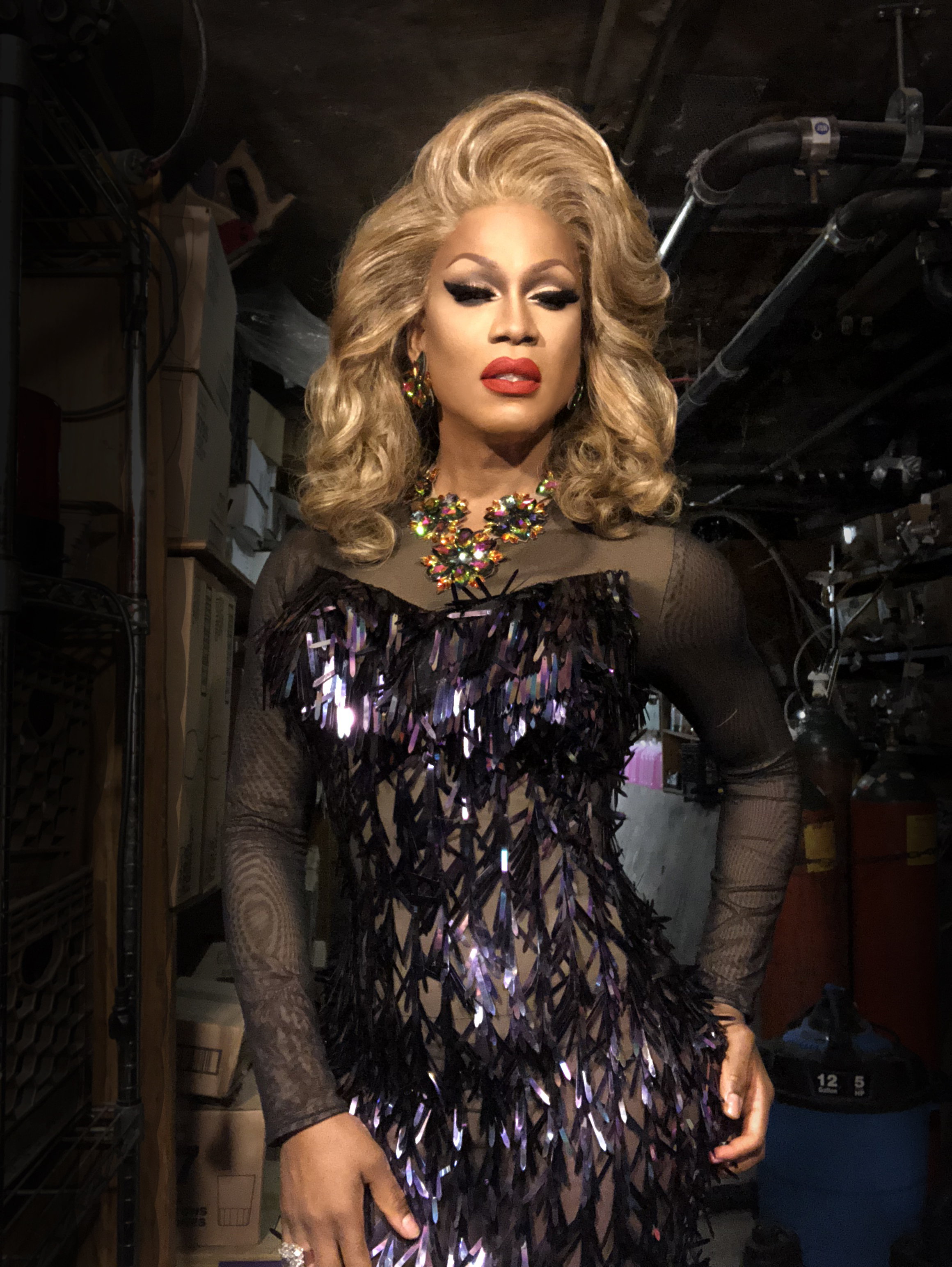
Shequida in 2019

Gary Hall, also known as Shequida Hall or mononymously as Shequida, is a Jamaican-American classically trained opera singer, songwriter, playwright, and drag artist based in New York City. His stage name is a take-off the Colombian singer Shakira.

He attended the Juilliard Music School in Manhattan, where he studied with noted bass-baritone Simon Estes.

As the female character Shequida, he has been the USA Network's spokesperson for Latin America. From 1997 to 1998, he played Wendi Mercury on the daytime television show One Life to Live. He starred in Daron Hagen's Vera of Las Vegas for its world premier in 2003.

His off-Broadway show, Opera for Dummies, garnered a positive review in The Boston Phoenix, and was nominated for a GLAAD Media Award.

In 2008, Shequida appeared on the TV reality competition America's Got Talent, getting into the Top 40 for the third season, but was eliminated, later saying in an interview that the experience "was very weird."

Shequida headlined in summer shows in Cherry Grove on Long Island in 2013 and 2014.

== See also ==
- Drag culture in New York City
- LGBT culture in New York City
- List of LGBT people from New York City
- NYC Pride March
