= Pickle (drag queen) =

American drag artist (born 1993)

- Born: Joseph Marcellus Faragher; 1993 (age 32–33)
- Education: Sarah Lawrence College
- Occupation: Drag performer
- Website: pickledragqueen.com

Pickle (né Joseph Marcellus Faragher; born 1993) is an American drag queen. She is the City of West Hollywood's first Drag Laureate.

== Early life ==
Pickle, born Joseph Marcellus Faragher, was raised in Country Club Park and Arlington Heights, Los Angeles. She loved playing dress-up as a child, often gender-bending while doing so. She attended Hamilton High School, starring in a production of A Funny Thing Happened on the Way to the Forum, in which she played a character who ends up in drag. It was then that she had an awakening to the drag world. She attended Sarah Lawrence College in New York where she further dabbled in drag and began organizing drag shows at the school.

== Career ==
Pickle got her professional start in the drag scene at gay western saloon Flaming Saddles West Hollywood, first as a guest, then host of all their weekend drag shows. She began her live singing act there. She chose her stage name based on her and her stepmother's In-N-Out order, which was a Number 2 with no onions and extra pickles; and Pickle also wanted to pay subtle tribute to drag queen Hedda Lettuce in choosing the name Pickle.

Pickle is the director of the Los Angeles Chapter of Drag Queen Story Hour. She has brought the story hour programming to The Academy Museum of Motion Pictures, the Los Angeles County Museum of Art, the Aquarium of the Pacific, Tinder, the Los Angeles Music Center, Independent Shakespeare Company, the City of West Hollywood, and the Los Angeles Public Library.

On July 1, 2023, Pickle took the post of the City of West Hollywood's first Drag Laureate. Her job description involved "enhanc[ing] the presence and appreciation of drag culture and arts in West Hollywood; promot[ing] partnerships with West Hollywood business and community organizations; celebrat[ing] the spirit and special qualities of the City of West Hollywood and its residents; and inspir[ing] an emerging generation of drag artists by celebrating and promoting drag history." She served her term until June 30, 2025.

== Personal life ==
In June 2023, Pickle clarified on the topic of her gender and sexuality: "I don't identify as transgender. I am a cisgender male. But it would be inaccurate to say that I am not gender fluid in some way as I practice professionally in drag. But it is an important distinction. I don't speak for the transgender community."

== Filmography ==
=== Television ===
Year	Title	Role
2023	The Weakest Link (NBC)	
	Dodgeball Thunderdome (Discovery Channel)	
	Sistas	
