= GoLite =

GoLite, LLC
- Company type: Private
- Industry: Sporting goods and outdoor gear
- Founded: Seattle, WA
- Headquarters: United States
- Products: Apparel

GoLite is an outdoor hiking and backpacking gear company that relaunched as an apparel manufacturer under new ownership in 2018. Humanitarian and environmental initiatives are a key part of the new ownership. As of 2018, GoLite has donated 14,000 uniforms to help health care workers in Uganda and Guatemala using company fabric resources. The new sustainable clothing collection is intended to combine outdoor performance and athletic functionality. GoLite is headquartered in Seattle, WA.

== History ==
In 1998 GoLite was founded by Kim and Demetri Coupounas as an outdoor equipment and clothing manufacturer.

During 16 years of operations of the original corporation, GoLite positioned itself as an innovator in lightweight outdoor products with a focus on technical performance, simplicity, and sustainable business practices. GoLite was widely viewed as the spark and driving force behind the ultralight backpacking movement and the overall shift towards lighter gear from other outdoor manufacturers that occurred in the decade after GoLite was founded.

In 2012, after achieving success with a growing e-commerce business, GoLite switched to a direct-to-consumer model, rapidly opening storefronts and continuing holiday warehouse sales across the country.

At one time, GoLite outdoor products were sold in retail shops in 23 countries and in over 20 wholly owned retail stores in the United States. However, in October 2014, GoLite filed for Chapter 11 bankruptcy reorganization.

In 2018, Outside Online interviewed a former employee, Andrew Skurka, concerning the demise of the original company. The article reported that the GoLite's 2014 bankruptcy stemmed from its overextension into athletic and lifestyle apparel to provide inventory for its brick-and-mortar stores. Skurka stated that “One mistake of the original GoLite was changing their identity every year or two” By 2014, the company had tied up too much cash in lifestyle apparel it couldn’t sell and moved to dissolve the business.

== Current operations ==
In May 2018, GoLite relaunched under new ownership.
