= Women's Health Action and Mobilization =

American activist organization

Women's Health Action and Mobilization (WHAM!) was an American activist organization based in New York City, established in 1989 in response to the U.S. Supreme Court ruling in Webster v. Reproductive Health Services that states may bar the use of public money and public facilities for abortions. WHAM! started as the direct action committee of the Reproductive Rights Coalition, but soon broke away to form its own organization.

WHAM! used direct action tactics such as draping the Statue of Liberty with two protest banners and disrupting the confirmation hearings of Supreme Court Justice David Souter. The first banner on the statue's crown said "No Choice, No Liberty" and the second banner hanging from the pedestal said "Abortion is Healthcare, Healthcare is a right."

In 1989 members of WHAM! and ACT UP took part in a controversial action at Saint Patrick's Cathedral to protest the church's position on homosexuality, safe-sex education and the use of condoms. WHAM! helped to form two additional activist groups, the New York Clinic Defense Task Force and the Church Ladies for Choice.

The organization disbanded between 1994 and 1995.

== Archives and history ==
As of 2007 there were approximately 40 boxes of WHAM! materials, categorized but not indexed, at the Tamiment Library, one of the special collections at New York University. In addition, interviews of past WHAM! participants were conducted in 2005 by Tamar W. Carroll, a doctoral candidate in History at the University of Michigan, for a dissertation concerning WHAM!, ACT UP, The National Congress of Neighborhood Women, and Mobilization For Youth. The resulting dissertation was titled "Grassroots Feminism: Direct Action Organizing and Coalition Building in New York City, 1955–1995". As part of her oral history research a forum on WHAM! was held at the Tamiment Library on October 15, 2005, with panel members, and most of the audience, consisting of former WHAM! activists. The forum was videotaped, and a recording of the forum is in the WHAM! collection at Tamiment, along with materials from the interviews conducted by Carroll.

A photograph of the protest banners on the Statue of Liberty was taken by Meryl Levin.
