= Church Ladies for Choice =

Queer and feminist activist performance group

Church Ladies for Choice is an activist performance group that uses parody, drag, and satire to advocate for abortion rights and critique religious conservatism. The group is known for its activism starting in the late 1980s and early 1990s in cities like Pittsburgh, New York City, Washington, D.C., Philadelphia, and internationally in Calgary. The group continues to perform at events such as the annual Dyke March in New York City.

== Origins ==
The earliest documented appearance of a group calling itself "Church Ladies for Choice" occurred in November 1989 in Pittsburgh. According to an Associated Press report, eight men dressed as women attended a city council meeting to protest Councilman Otis Lyons Jr.'s opposition to abortion in cases of rape and incest. The demonstrators, wearing dresses, hats, and heavy makeup, "taunted" Lyons for his statements and read a letter demanding his resignation and an apology "to women, especially the victims of rape and incest." One of the demonstrators, Michael Malinchak, said the costumes were inspired by The Church Lady from Saturday Night Live and that the participants were members of local gay and lesbian rights organizations.

In the early 1990s, the group appeared in New York City and Washington, D.C., connected to feminist and queer activist groups such as Women's Health Action and Mobilization (WHAM!) and the AIDS Coalition to Unleash Power (ACT UP). Activist Elizabeth Meixell, a member of both groups, is often credited with forming the New York City chapter, which brought together queer and feminist activists for theatrical protests in support of reproductive rights.

== Activities and performance style ==
Members of Church Ladies for Choice performed in exaggeratedly feminine attire, flowered dresses, pearls, and wide-brimmed hats in what they described as "bad drag." Their performances parodied pious Christian womanhood while delivering pro-choice messages and songs rewritten with feminist or queer themes. The group frequently participated in clinic defense actions, counter-protesting outside abortion clinics where anti-abortion activists were present. Their use of humor and camp was intended to defuse tension, mock religious hypocrisy, and increase queer visibility within feminist reproductive-rights spaces.

== International chapters ==
By 1994, the Church Ladies for Choice concept had spread to Canada, where a group formed in Calgary, Alberta. According to the Calgary Herald, members using names such as "Aunty Therapy," "Sister Honor Perversity," and "Sister Divinity Fudge" performed satirical hymns and parodies at International Women's Day celebrations and other progressive events.

== Continuing presence ==
The New York City Church Ladies for Choice have continued to appear at reproductive rights and queer pride events into the 21st century. The group has been photographed performing at the annual Dyke March, where they sing parodic hymns such as "God Is a Lesbian."

== See also ==
- ACT UP
- Women's Health Action and Mobilization
- Drag (entertainment)
