= Paige Turner (drag queen) =

American comedian and singer

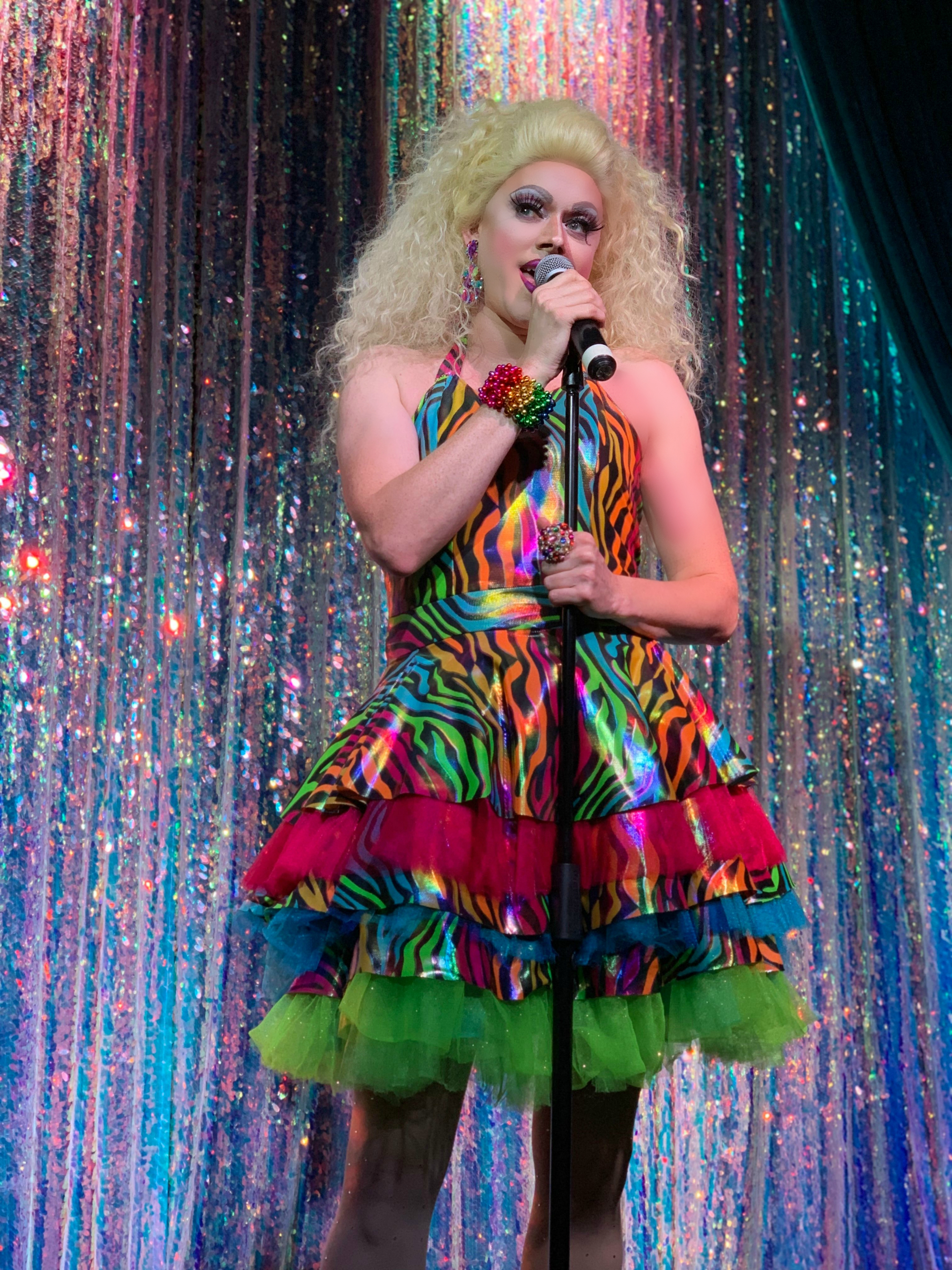
- Turner singing live at the Palm Cabaret in Puerto Vallarta in 2019
- Born: Daniel Frank Kelley
- Occupations: Drag performer, singer-songwriter, actor
- Website: www.paigeturnernyc.com

Daniel Frank Kelley, also known by the stage names Paige Turner and Showbiz Spitfire, is an American drag queen, comedian, and singer who lives in New York City. Kelley, a stage actor, created the character Paige Turner in 1996 at East of Eighth restaurant in Manhattan. Turner's fictitious parents are said to be Pee Wee Herman and Barbie. Turner sings live and lip synchs during her over the top comedic performances.

== Career ==
Paige Turner is one of the original creators, producers, and host of So You Think You Can Drag at New World Stages in Midtown Manhattan. Billed as NYC's live drag reality show, SYTYCD completed its 5th season Fall 2014 with celebrity judges including Adam Lambert, Charles Busch, Zach Booth, and Jackie Hoffman.

Turner also performs parodies on YouTube which have included parodies of Carly Rae Jepsen's Call Me Maybe, One Direction's What Makes You Beautiful and the Grindr Connection a parody of the Muppet's Rainbow Connection.

Grindr Connection won a 2015 GLAM AWARD for Best Music Video. She recently made her Provincetown debut at the legendary "Crown & Anchor" with her one-woman show and will return there summer of 2015.

Turner is usually referred to as "Showbiz Spitfire Paige Turner" and is known as the Holly Golightly of drag.

Turner coined the catch-phrase Slurp! Which is her term for cute sexy thangs and is the name of her long running show in NYC and also has spawned a line of merchandise.

Turner was the official host of the original LGBT Expo 2015. and will headline at the 1st Annual Austin International Drag Festival in May 2015.

== See also ==
- LGBT culture in New York City
- List of LGBT people from New York City
- NYC Pride March
