= Amelia Golightly =

Amelia Golightly was the presenter of a three-minute parody of RTÉ's A Prayer at Bedtime, (a late night TV spot which was overtly Christian in presentation) on the late night 2FM radio show (), Moloney After Midnight, which ran in the late 1990s.

The format of the show invariably followed the exploits of protagonist Amelia Golightly, who used events in her daily life as parables to preach virtues such as tolerance and charity. The events which Golightly relayed were usually relating to sex, alcohol or other vices and the segment drew much of its humour from the contrast between the saccharine message being broadcast and the circumstances under which Golightly discovered this message.

Each slot followed the same format:

- Golightly would talk about some event that had happened during her daily routine which would inevitably result in a thought suddenly striking her. This thought usually struck her when she was writhing around naked in some public place.
- She would then draw a comparison between this event and life in the shows catch phrase ("Liiiiiiiiiiiiiife" pronounced repeatedly).
- The bulk of the segment would then consist of Amelia discussing how the event made her think about her life and how she was ultimately better for this event.
- The segment would end with Amelia asking her audience to improve their lives by following her advice, followed by a drawn-out 'Goodbye'.

The segment was best known for Golightly's extremely long and drawn out way of saying the word "life", which she did in every episode, drawing comparisons between various topics (such as having sex with your neighbour or getting a new computer) and life. It was also infamous for her comments on topical characters on RTÉ programming, particularly Cynthia Ni Murchu, Claire McKeown and Twink. There were many running gags and recurring motifs. One such running gag was that Golightly had abducted Irish singer/songwriter Enya and was holding her captive around the house. Enya would often be chained to a radiator, locked in the cupboard under the stairs or in some other unfortunate predicament.

As the series of shorts developed Golightly's catchphrases grew more bizarre and eventually ended up having more emphasis than the main story. Initially the words 'Life' and 'Goodbye' were pronounced normally but they became elongated and experimental as time progressed. Golightly's reflections also became more abstract, disjointed and darker as time went on.

It has never been publicly revealed who voiced Golightly, however according to her agency résumé, Fiona Looney was responsible for the over 2000 nightly reflections as the character.
