= Holly Golightly =

Holly Golightly may refer to:

- Holly Golightly, the main character of Truman Capote's 1958 novella Breakfast at Tiffany's, the 1961 film adaptation, and the 1966 musical
- Holly Golightly (illustrator) (born 1964), comic book writer and artist, earlier known as Fauve and Holly G.
- Holly Golightly (singer) (born 1966), British singer-songwriter
- Holly (Golightly), a girl in the novel The Lovely Bones (2002) and its film adaptation
