= Occupational inequality =

Unequal treatment in the workplace

Occupational inequality is the unequal treatment of people based on gender, sexuality, age, disability, socioeconomic status, religion, height, weight, accent, or ethnicity in the workplace. When researchers study trends in occupational inequality they usually focus on distribution or allocation pattern of groups across occupations, for example, the distribution of men compared to women in a certain occupation. Secondly, they focus on the link between occupation and income, for example, comparing the income of whites with blacks in the same occupation.

Some consequences of occupational inequality include things like economic 8, reduced well-being, the undermining of trust in institutions and the hampering of overall economic growth and productivity. Ways to address it include promoting inclusivity and diversity in the hiring process as well as the researching and addressing of biases in recruitment, pay, and promotion.

== Effects ==
Occupational inequality greatly affects the socioeconomic status of an individual which is linked with their access to resources like finding a job, buying a house, etc. If an individual experiences occupational inequality, it may be more difficult for them to find a job, advance in their job, get a loan or buy a house. Occupational standing can lead to predictions of outcomes such as social standing and wealth which have long-lasting effects on the individual as well as their dependents. Segregation by gender in the labor force is high, hence the reason why there remain disparities and inequalities among men and women of equitable qualifications. The division of labor is a central feature for gender based inequality. It influences the structure both based on its economic aspects and construction of identities. However, studies show that the general overall picture of gender and labor has not been evaluated. The importance of these issues is pertinent for the future structure of our labor force.

== History ==
The enactment of federal equal employment opportunity (EEO) laws were passed in the 1960s to enforce equal employment opportunities and to eradicate past discrimination against women and minority men in the workplace. In the 1960s and 1970s, the US saw a tremendous decrease in occupational inequality; however, in the 1980s and 1990s, it began to rise again.

== Theories ==
Richard A. Miech poses that occupational inequality could diminish over time. He states that race and sex discrimination is inefficient in a competitive world because it calls for only white men to be employed. White men, however, will demand a higher salary than women or people of other races who have the same education and abilities, and thus discriminating employers lose more money. Non-discriminating employers can gain an edge in the competitive market by hiring women and minorities, thereby reducing occupational inequality.

According to the process of "aging effects", occupational inequality will continue with advancing age. According to this theory, the labor market consists of two sectors of jobs; one is the "primary" core of good jobs with good working conditions, advancement opportunities and job safety. The other is the "peripheral" sector of bad jobs with bad working conditions, low advancement opportunities and little job safety. Mobility between these two groups is difficult. Women and minorities are disproportionately placed into the peripheral sector early on in their careers with little chance of moving into the primary group to achieve equal occupational status.

The theory of "homosocial reproduction" suggests those in high positions tend to pick the employees who have similar social backgrounds as their own for advancement. Since the majority of managers are men, women are less chosen for career advancement.

== Measurement ==
The Duncan Socioeconomic Index (SEI) has been most commonly used to measure Occupational Status. It is based on two factors, occupational earnings and occupational education.

One way occupational inequality is measured is by the index of dissimilarity (D). The equation is as follows:

D=½ε_{i}|X_{i}-Y_{i}|

where X_{i} equals the percent of race or sex group X in the labor force in occupation i and Y_{i} equals the percent of race or sex group Y in occupation i. D is the measure of one half the sum of the absolute difference between the percentage distributions. The values range from 0 to 100 and measures the relative separation or integration of groups across an area. If the value equals 0% it means the area is distributed evenly. If the value is 100% it means the area is completely segregated. If the value is 60%, for example, it means 60% of workers would have to change occupations to make the distributions equal.

== Occupational segregation ==
Occupational inequality is often linked with occupational segregation in a work place. The greater the segregation in a workplace, the greater the occupational inequality. This is true specifically for jobs dominated by a certain minority or women. They often have bad work environments and less income than white males who usually make up the managerial positions with better work environments and more pay.

== Gender inequality ==
Some common inequalities that can exist in the workplace are the gender-based imbalances of individuals in power and command over the management of the organization. Sometimes women do not move up into higher paid positions as quickly as men though this can be due to a number of factors including career breaks due to having children, less motivation to apply for promotion or discriminatory attitudes or behaviour. Some organizations have more inequality than others, and the extent to which it occurs can differ greatly. In the workplace the men usually hold the higher positions and the women often hold lower paid positions such as secretaries. Gender inequality can also be understood when looking at transgender workers. Workers have different experiences when transitioning at the workplace. Power that was held previously can be lost when transitioning to a woman while workers transitioning to a man can experience a power gain.

== Racial inequality ==
Ethnicity has a large influence on the quality of jobs as well as the amount of money an individual will make in the workforce. Today, African American men working full-time and year-round have 72 percent of the average earnings of comparable white men. Between African American and white women, the wage ratio is 85 percent. The black unemployment rate is typically at about double the rate among white people. White men have multiple substantial advantages in the workplace. They are offered a larger variety of job opportunities. The positions that earn the most money and have the most power are usually occupied by white men. Though this type of inequality has been lowered in the last 20 years, it is still common.

== Causes ==
There are organizing processes that produce class, racial, and gender inequalities. A number of inequalities occur because of implicit bias. Some people have argued that the women gain their social position from the men around them, such as their fathers and their husbands. This is because womanhood has, throughout history, been attributed to child bearing and raising a family. Employment, and the benefits that came with it, always came after their family life. In the workplace it is required that a worker shows up on time and works continuously for the entire workday, which usually consists of eight hours in western countries. Since women were responsible for raising children, they had much less time and flexibility to partake in full-time jobs, and thus women in the workforce were generally only seen in part-time positions. Others maybe have been kept permanently part-time as a labour loophole. This trend is part of what leads to modern-day inequality.

== Inequality in education ==
As the occupational pipeline, the educational background and environment in which people develop profoundly shape the direction in which their career path will follow. Historically, there has been a significant gender imbalance in fields of study. Women have always dominated the humanities, while men have held a sizeable difference when it comes to science, technology, engineering, and mathematics (STEM) fields. Some of the primary factors leading to gender imbalances in collegiate fields of study include differences in pre-college preparation, personal preference for a field of study, and career prospects.

== Getting a job: skills, networks, and discrimination ==
Low socioeconomic status correlates with an individual's human capital, defined by the Organization of Economic Cooperation and Development (OECD) as the "knowledge, skills, competencies and other attributes that are relevant to economic activity". The term capital-skill complementarity describes the close relationship that exists between access to human capital and skills development. The existence of this complementarity indicates that the socioeconomic status, by means of its direct effect on access to human capital, determines employee skill sets and employability.

Existing disparities between socio-economic groups continue the perpetuation of a workforce divided into unskilled and skilled workers and ensures that low SES Americans will continue to lack the human capital they need to develop employable skills. Evidence from research conducted by the OECD shows that the skills-education gap has widened in Africa, South America, Eastern Europe and most developed OECD countries. Because skills facilitate the diffusion of technical knowledge and innovation and human capital is key to the individuals' ability to assimilate new technology and to develop institutional knowledge as well as to increase access to high-quality connections low SES has been shown to contribute to inequalities in skill building and thus depresses the employability of low-income Americans.

=== Skills and employment: job placement and employment trends ===
An integral part of anyone's ability to obtain a job lies in his or her skills and ability to perform that job successfully and efficiently. And beyond simply attaining a job, the skills they are able to acquire over time along with the skills they possessed previously also affect their wages once they have a job. However, it is difficult to discuss the role of skill in the workplace without discussing its relationship to racial and gender discrimination. The sections on discrimination will talk about more specifically about how the ability to get hired and the gaps in wages are affected by race and gender, but in the context of skill, the two relate in the context of educational opportunities and resources. In nationwide studies, skill supply can often be incorrectly measured because people assume that any standard level of educational achievement (such as high school graduate) should provide a common standard for skill; however, minorities that only have access to local, less academically rigorous schools are likely to be less skilled than whites that are at the same standard educational level. Furthermore, differences in wages between racial groups can be attributed to differences in skill that began during early education. According to human capital theory, there is a positive correlation between a worker's skill supply and their wage earnings. The more skilled the worker and the better they are at their job, the more they will get paid. There is also a correlation between skill and education, suggesting that the more educated a worker is, the more skilled they will be. Therefore, there will be wage gaps between racial groups because of the differences in education and therefore, skill.

With the evolving role of education in skill-acquisition, regulators now require professionals to have education to get jobs than they had to in the past. E.g., nurses are now required to hold a bachelor's degree in nursing to work in several jurisdictions. This leads to increased enrolment in nursing courses at colleges, and forces nurses to return to school to fulfil the new requirements. Additionally, with increasing role of technology in the workplace, they must have specialized skill-sets. Companies today are subdividing labor into a complex networks of individual, specialized tasks. Specialization makes it difficult to find jobs, particularly for older workers who are not familiar with modern technology. Employees were able to have a more general skill set encompassing multiple aspects of a business, but must be highly specialized in specific skills now. More skilful workers can command a higher wage, making it even more difficult to bridge the racial and gender wage and employment gaps.

=== Introduction to discrimination ===
Discrimination is the unfair treatment of an individual based on different characteristics such as age, race, or sex. Title VII of the Civil Rights Act of 1964 specifically addresses protection against discrimination in regard to employment, outlawing employment discrimination of an individual "because of such individual's race, color, religion, sex, or national origin". With the passage of the Equal Employment Opportunity Act of 1972, the Equal Employment Opportunity Commission regulates the compliance to Title VII of employers with fifteen or more employees. The EEOC investigates and, if deemed necessary, files suit against employers who face charges of discrimination. A brief overview of the forms of discrimination the EEOC investigates shows the advances in equal opportunity legislation over the years.

Age discrimination outlaws unfair treatment of individuals who are age forty or older. Discrimination practices may include excessive harassment of an individual or limiting an individual's work opportunities based on their age. Disability discrimination policies protect individuals covered by the Americans with Disabilities Act or the Rehabilitation Act from unfair treatment. Policies require the employer to provide "reasonable accommodation" (example: wheelchair accessibility) for disabled individuals, unless the employer provides sufficient reasons for why changes would cause "undue hardship".

Equal pay and compensation policies state that employers must provide men and women in the same workplace equal pay (this includes all types of salary) for equal work. Based on content, the jobs must be "substantially" equal, but not necessarily identical.

Genetic information (including family medical history) must remain confidential information. Employers are prohibited from discriminating against an individual based on genetic information or requiring the disclosure of genetic information.

National origin policies prohibit discrimination against an individual because of their real or assumed ethnicity, accent, or geographic roots. These policies also protect against discrimination toward individuals associated with people from particular national origins or groups.

Pregnancy policies state that women who are temporarily unable to perform their regular duties at work due to pregnancy or childbirth must receive the same benefits and treatment that a temporarily disabled employee would receive. This may include such opportunities as unpaid leave, alternative work assignments, or disability leave.

Race/color discrimination includes the unfair treatment of an individual based on race, physical characteristics associated with certain races, or skin color. Policies protect spouses, and individuals affiliated with or belonging to race-based or color-associated organizations.

Religious discrimination policies protect all individuals "who have sincerely held religious, ethical or moral beliefs". Unless the employer proves it an undue hardship, dress and grooming accommodations, as well as reasonable adjustments to allow for the individual to practice their religion may be required.

Retaliation policies prohibit employers from retaliating against employees who have filed discrimination charges, complaints, or help with an investigation.

Sex discrimination policies protect individuals from facing unfair treatment because of their sex or their association with a sex-specific group or organization.

Sexual harassment laws protect individuals from, " sexual harassment' or unwelcome sexual advances, requests for sexual favors, and other verbal or physical harassment of a sexual nature ". Offensive comments also fall under sexual harassment and may result in legal charges.

More recently, groups have claimed reverse discrimination: as employers strive to reach affirmative action minority quota goals, majority group members may receive unfair treatment as a result. The EEOC regulates employer practices regardless of minority or majority status.

=== Discrimination in the workplace ===
Despite the anti-discrimination legislative measures taken, discrimination in the workplace is still a prevalent issue. Racial discrimination particularly remains problematic.

=== Networks: the mechanisms and advantages of professional connections ===
Complex networks are a core part basic employment and business practices that exist in our society today. Networking has existed throughout human history and a variety of cultures. Internet based networking such as LinkedIn has increased in recent times. There are two kinds of network ties: strong ties, which are connections with people who you have frequent and close interactions with, and weak ties, which are connections with people whom you have infrequent and sparse interactions with. However, the basic goal is to make as many connections you can and in every direction possible. Whether that is laterally, below you, and above you, it is beneficial to know people of all calibers. Although the law prohibits employers from choosing not to hire someone based on an uncontrollable factor like race or gender, it is still prominent in our society today. The Fourteenth Amendment, stating that all citizens be treated equally, has promoted and created equality in the work force, but it isn't able to offer everyone the same opportunities. Some people are born into lifestyles that don't give them the same opportunities that more fortunate people have, and these disadvantages are the cause of the inequality we still see today. Although socioeconomic factors play a huge role in these opportunities, a person's race and gender are equally responsible for the connections and opportunities they are presented with.

In her article, "Don't put my name on it," Sandra Smith, a sociologist at the University of California Berkeley, discusses the prevalence of discriminatory practices in our society today. She focuses on the African American population, and the limitations that burden them as a result of networking disadvantages. "From a social capital theoretical perspective, deficiencies in access to mainstream ties and institutions explain persistent joblessness among the black urban poor". The historical disadvantages that African Americans still face today are the reason for the lack of progression in networking. Regardless of true mental or physical capabilities, African Americans are disadvantaged when it comes to attaining a job, simply because they aren't part of the largely white networks that dominate our society today. It is difficult to meet the right people and find the right opportunities when our society subconsciously puts up barriers to them. "Instead, the inefficaciousness of job referral networks appears to have more to do with functional deficiencies (see Coleman and Hoffer 1987)—the disinclination of potential job contacts to assist when given the opportunity to do so, not because they lack information or the ability to influence hires, but because they perceive pervasive untrustworthiness among their job-seeking ties and choose not to assist," (3).

Networking, the idea of using connections to foster new relationships and opportunities should be an advantage to every member of our society. Laws that demand equal opportunity for everyone should also generate similar equality in the work force. However, historical discriminatory attitudes that continue to plague the country today are making it difficult for people of minorities to attain jobs, especially because of the significance of networking and the extent to which is generates success.

== Gender pay gap ==
The gender wage gap is the difference between average earnings for men and women. There are multiple theories for the reasons as to why this exists, but a large amount of the gender wage gap can be attributed to the fact that women work different jobs than men, as opposed to that women are paid differently within the same jobs or establishments.

In a study completed in 2005 it was found that working fathers are paid an 8.6% higher starting wage than working mothers.

== Pay gap between mothers and non-mothers ==
It has also been found that there is a pay gap between mothers and non-mothers. "Mothers were recommended a 7.9% lower starting salary than non-mothers" (Correll and Bernard 2005)

== Returning to work ==
When women return to work after maternity leave they can feel uncertain about where they stand. "According to figures analysed by the House of Commons library, 14 per cent of the 340,000 women who take maternity leave each year find their jobs under threat, when they try to return to work.". (Fairley 2013)

== Career experiences: gender inequality in the workplace ==
=== Tokenism ===
Tokenism is an extremely common practice in the workplace environment of today; it can essentially be defined as the act of going out of one's way to include members of minority groups. According to Rosabeth Kanter's 1977 publication Men and Women of the Corporation, the inability to achieve equality within the workplace can be largely attributed to the placement of "token status" on certain groups of individuals. Oftentimes tokens possess marginal status as members who are allowed entrance but do not get to experience full participation due to their status as an "outsider" who may be fully qualified for the position but does not possess the necessary characteristics, i.e. sex or race, that are usually expected of persons in said position. The term token can also be used to describe people who are hired due to their difference from other members of the company or other employees: oftentimes this is done as an attempt to prove that the group does not discriminate against said group of people. This variety of tokenism is thought to have originated in the Southern United States, where schools and businesses would admit token African Americans in order to meet the desegregation orders of the federal government. In multiple instances, the number of tokens accepted into a group or company is less than the number of people from the token group who are qualified for acceptance. However, in some cases, tokens are people who do not possess the necessary qualifications to hold a position but are admitted because of their token status.

An individual who possesses token status can have an affected career experience. Kanter hypothesizes that oftentimes, the token's experience is less related to whatever attribute makes them a token and more so influenced by the structural restraints that are intrinsic to the positions they fill. To elaborate, the positions held by tokens are generally lacking in power and the opportunity for advancement. Additionally, tokens operating within workplaces with skewed ratios that result in them being extremely outnumbered are "often treated as representations of their category, as symbols rather than individuals". Tokens are also extremely visible and subject to scrutiny due to their evident contrast from the majority. This can create large amounts of pressure to perform well; tokens will often either respond to this with overachievement or underachievement, both of which make further advancement difficult. More often than not, token status often leads to "demotivation, lower levels of performance, and diminished aspirations for the future".

Many solutions to the problem of tokenism have been suggested; though a balanced work force will not eliminate all of the issues faced by tokens in the workplace, movement towards balance will help open the doors to some improvement. However, balancing the numbers and ratios is not necessarily the biggest issue at hand: a number of researchers suggest that power, privilege, and prestige are more important factors in the relationship between dominant and secondary groups in the workplace. Some believe that as the proportions of minority and majority workers balance out, tension within the workplace is actually more likely to increase rather than decrease. Though this may be true, the theory that increasing the proportions of the token groups would alleviate the issue should not be in any way discounted. This solution could possibly "reduce the isolation and effects of tokenism, improve token's position in the power structure of the department, and also increase their opportunities". Another solution could be to increase the number of tokens in managerial positions and to apply new policies of hiring and promotion; this affirmative action could work to give tokens the confidence they need to become full participants in the workplace rather than just representations of their category or token attribute.

=== The "double bind" for female workers ===
People's career experiences are largely affected by how they are viewed by their coworkers, and the way employees' actions are perceived may vary based on gender due to the existence of a "double bind" for women. Social scientist Gregory Bateson described the general concept of a double bind as "a situation in which no matter what a person does, he 'can't win.'" If individuals are instructed or expected to act in contradictory ways, then they are caught in a double bind because no action they choose will be determined acceptable.

Most men do not have difficulty reconciling their gender with expectations as an employee, for "definitions of ideal workers as those who are completely dedicated to their work, without career interruptions or outside responsibilities, privilege male workers." Additionally, being confident and assertive reflects positive traits for both men and leaders. Women, on the other hand, are compared to stereotypes about passive femininity that mean if they are assertive, they are viewed as acting in conflict with their internal nature and criticized. More generally, "when women act in ways that are consistent with gender stereotypes, they are viewed as less competent leaders," but "when women act in ways that are inconsistent with such stereotypes, they're considered as unfeminine." This represents a double bind because both perceptions paint women in a negative light.

How women choose to react to this double bind situation will affect their experience in the workplace. For example, while women who act stereotypically masculine "might be viewed as competent because of their leadership style, they also receive more negative evaluations of their interpersonal skills than women who adopt a 'feminine' style" and "not being liked can […] negatively impact women's work relationships, access to social networks, day-to-day interactions and, ultimately, their advancement opportunities." As some industries, such as Wall St. firms, rely on peer evaluations to determine pay, promotion, and more generally assess a worker's contribution and worth, how women are perceived will affect their career experiences. Additionally, women who are continually passed over for advancement may choose to leave rather than stay and feel undervalued.

Sociologists have specifically studied how the idea of the ideal worker clashes with the view of women as mothers or potential mothers. For example, Catherine Turco explored the leverage buyout (LBO) industry and determined that "by casting the ideal investor as one who puts commitment to work above all else, the LBO image implicitly specifies another social role—that of mother—as mutually incompatible with the occupational role." Similarly, lab experiments and audit studies found that a "motherhood penalty" exists that can negatively affect wages and performance evaluations. Moreover, negative views of mothers working may be expanded to non-mothers and even those who are unmarried because "all women [may be viewed] as potential mothers." This may be due to cultural assumptions that women will leave work when they have children, thus causing other workers and managers to view them as less committed, even if they have expressed that this is not their plan.

=== Gay, lesbian, bisexual, and transgender workplace inequality ===
Since the Stonewall riots of 1969, the visibility and acceptance of gay, lesbian, bisexual, and transgender (LGBTQIA2S+) employees in corporate America has steadily been on the rise; the first gay employee network appeared in 1978, and in 1991, the first Fortune 1000 company offered domestic-partner health benefits to its employees. Today, the majority of Fortune 500 companies offer both sexual orientation and gender identity protections, as well as domestic-partner health benefits. The rapid increase in queer workplace equality can be attributed to a number of factors, most notably isomorphism.

Mimetic pressures, in which competing firms model the procedures of competitors, are especially visible in the adoption of domestic-partner benefits. For instance, after Wells Fargo and Bank of America adopted domestic-partner benefits in 1998, other banks, like Bankers Trust and Chase, soon followed voluntarily. These mimetic pressures are still visible today; in 2002, just two percent of Fortune 500 companies included gender identity in their non-discrimination policies, while in 2012, 57 percent of companies do so. Much like these mimetic pressures, normative isomorphism, which stems from the professionalization of a practice, also helped diffuse equitable benefits. A 1991 Forbes story, "Gay in Corporate America", "broke the longstanding silence of the business press regarding gay and lesbian issues", beginning an important trend; diversity consultants and human resource professionals concluded through the 1990s that "inclusion equals performance". Though much progress has been made in the area of same-sex benefits, LGBTQIA2S+ employees continue to face challenges in the workplace that their non-queer coworkers do not. According to a 2009 survey, 58 percent of LGBTQIA2S+ employees say coworkers make jokes or derogatory comments about LGBTQIA2S+ people "at least once in a while".

But perhaps the single greatest contributor to the LGBTQIA2S+ experience in the workplace is the decision of employees to come out or remain closeted at work. Brian McNaught, a lauded leader of gay sensitivity training, explained the pressures that surround a decision, noting that "gay people who have to worry about what will happen to them if they come out […] generally produce at a lower level than gay employees who don't" as it takes much energy to "put on a mask"; 54 percent of closeted employees report "lying about their personal lives in the past twelve months". Non-LGBTQIA2S+ employees are never required to make the conscious decision to share or hide the details of their personal lives, while LGBTQIA2S+ employees make that very decision daily. Even with the added stress of the "mask", a 2009 survey concluded 51 percent of LGBTQIA2S+ employees report hiding their LGBTQIA2S+ identity to those at work.

These unique experiences have compounded to create significant concrete inequalities for LGBTQIA2S+ workers in today's workplaces. For queer employees, there is an undeniable "pink ceiling"; not a single Fortune 1000 CEO is openly gay, and it is documented that being gay negatively impacts an employee's opportunity for promotion – 28 percent of gay employees remain closeted "because they feel it may be an obstacle to career advancement or development opportunities". Some of these fears are well founded; only 21 states and the District of Columbia currently have employment laws prohibiting discrimination based on sexual orientation – in multiple states it is thus perfectly legal to fire an employee for being gay. In 2020, the US Supreme Court ruled that the 1964 Civil Rights Act protects gay, lesbian, and transgender employees from discrimination based on sex. However, the federal law still did not protect LGBT employees from being fired based on their sexual orientation or gender identity in businesses of 15 workers or less.

In addition, transgender employees in particular also face other challenges. Though courts recently concluded that transness is a protected class under Title VII of the Civil Rights Act of 1964, most notably in Smith v. City of Salem in 2004, courts still allow gender-specific dress and grooming codes, and are legally able to reject exemptions for transgender employees; transgender employees thus often face the difficult choice of complying with the dress code or dressing in the gender they present and potentially losing their jobs. For queer employees, workplace inequality thus remains a fact of life.

=== Inequality in the financial field ===
==== The glass ceiling ====
The Wall Street Journal came up with the term "the glass ceiling" to describe the barriers that women face in efforts to get promoted to top-tier positions within their corporations. Despite their qualifications (women constitute 58% of all university graduates), women make up less than 8% of the top corporate-level positions. Although a number of firms employ diversity programs aimed at reaching greater number of women in the field, women are still not reaching the top levels within their companies at the same rates as men. Multiple investment banks in particular try to hire women whenever possible (refer to tokenism section). Recruiters, however, still inherently use statistical generalization: the stereotypical woman is more likely to leave her position sooner than a man due to family-related reasons means that women inherently face greater challenges to promotion when the opportunity arise.

==== The corporate culture ====
Financial rewards often play a huge role in people's decisions to enter and stay in corporate firms, but their experiences there often explain why they left. The "up-or-out" system prevalent in multiple consulting firms can help to explain the male-dominated hierarchy; for women who require maternity leave their roles cannot be sustained in such an environment. While multiple firms support formal internal diversity initiatives, women are often also excluded from the informal networks that men partake in outside of the office, activities that revolve around a "jock-talk" atmosphere which bonds the men and helps create connections that are important when promotions become available.
Moreover, a number of Wall Street corporations are deeply rooted in their beliefs concerning gender norms and are said to cultivate machismo. In general, employees of professional firms tended toward homophily preferences, where they were drawn to coworkers similar to themselves. Thus, on Wall Street, just being a white, male junior colleague may to give you an advantage in promotional opportunities. At the same time, these practices also isolated those in the minority who felt a lack of support from their peers and superiors. In efforts to combat such prevailing culture, Wall Street firms have implemented equal opportunity guidelines, followed class action suits, placed diversity initiatives, and created grievance procedures.

==== Access: barriers and advantages ====
A preference for coworkers of similar features to oneself meant that managers often specifically selected individuals to share accounts and deals with; multiple times, this meant disadvantaging women and minorities for account allocations, performance evaluations and relative compensation. Connections made through informal networks often advantaged those individuals with better access to clients, accounts, and deals. Often, women are driven to switch fields within the business sector, for example from corporate finance to equity research, from heavily male-dominated to those that are more gender neutral. Such trade may result in substantial pay cuts, as the median earning in the new sector can be much lower than the median income in the old sector.
Moreover, mentorship can play an important role in one's experiences at a workplace. Multiple firms have formal mentorship programs to guide promising new junior employees. In cases where the mentorship starts informally (the senior partner does so without company dictation to do so) some junior employees will inherently have the advantage over their peers. This can often end disastrously for workers who are outside of the informal networks that can start such ties. On Wall Street specifically, there were multiple male senior executives who were committed to encouraging success from women junior executives, with 65% of women who had mentors noting their mentors were male.

=== Inequality in STEM fields ===
In 2019, women accounted for 27% of workers in STEM-qualified fields, and earned almost 20% less than men in the same industries. The number of women in STEM changed minutely in 2021, as the percentage went up to 28%.

==== Communication ====
In STEM industries, meetings and technical discussions are often knowledge and experience based. In these settings, people with more dominant – and often perceived to be "masculine" – personas tend to drive and overpower the conversation because they sound more knowledgeable on a certain topic. This way of communication, often correlated with self-promotion, can put men and people with more masculine personas at an advantage because "self-promotion is a stereotypically masculine communication style involving aggressive displays of confidence that assert one's own superiority". And even though "women's abilities to successfully self-promote are often inhibited by fear of backlash or social sanctions for counterstereotypical behavior", women in technology often feel the need to be more masculine to have their voice heard.

Another way this manifests itself is in varying communication styles. A person with a "competitive communication style" may frequently interrupt others as a way of showing dominance. Studies have shown that interruptions are associated with masculinity as a meta-analysis of 43 studies found that men make more intrusive interruptions than women do.

==== Social factors ====
Another factor that creates the difference in experience for men and women in STEM fields is the social climate. The idea of the "old boy culture" is pertinent in male-dominated STEM fields where women find it difficult to fit in. Furthermore, female role models and mentors are rare for young women in these industries. Because mentors are important in aiding in career development as well as building self-esteem in the workplace, the lack of female mentors inhibits the growth and success of women in STEM workplaces. These social factors lead to an environment that may not be inclusive towards women because women feel like they need to be "one of the boys" in order to be included.

Because of these social factors and the communication differences between men and women, the experience for women in STEM fields varies greatly from that of women in more gender-balanced or female-dominated industries.

== Work and family ==
=== Inequality in household work and childcare ===
Beginning in the 1960s, the U.S. began to experience a significant change in the family division of labor. During the past several decades, the contributions of men to household tasks have risen considerably, increasing from about 15% to over 30% of the total housework, whereas the average daily contribution of working, married mothers has decreased by 2 hours. Despite these changes, there are still inequalities in the distribution of childcare and housework between men and women. Here we discuss several work-family ideologies, the ideology promoted by most American institutions, explanations for why this is the prevailing ideology, and implications of the resulting gendered division of labor.

Generally, the way in which labor is divided in the home is reflective of the work-family ideologies to which the husband and wife individually subscribe. Mary Blair-Loy identifies three of these ideologies: traditional, egalitarian, and transitional. The traditional family arrangement is the breadwinner-homemaker model of the 1950s in which women are expected to fully devote themselves to household management and childcare, while their husband's earn the family income. The egalitarian arrangement entails that the husband and wife be equally active at home and in the workforce. The transitional arrangement allows for both husband and wife to be engaged in the workforce, with the wife taking on the bulk of the homemaking responsibilities. Sociologist Arlie Hochschild calls the additional time spent on housework "the second shift" for women. Families that adopt the transitional arrangement often utilize full-time, paid childcare because the work of both parents demands long hours, even if the wife works only part-time.

Although individuals subscribe to varying work-family ideologies, American institutions reflect a gendered division of labor that encourages women to be active in the domestic sphere and men in the workforce. There is a stigma associated with women working full-time, especially if they are married or have children, whereas men are expected to work full-time. These gender norms are particularly evident on Wall Street where men and women view either the breadwinner-homemaker model or full-time hired childcare as the answer if they choose to have children. Stay-at-home wives enable men to devote their time and energy to their careers. Even outside of Wall Street, multiple organizations assume that most families employ a traditional ideology although, statistically, this is no longer the norm.

A number of explanations have been posited for the existence of a gendered division of labor. Gary Becker theorizes that women are more likely to leave the labor force or work part-time because they have a lower earning potential than men. Thus, it makes sense economically for men to focus on their careers if the family's aim is to maximize income and provide adequate childcare. There is some support for Becker's assertion. After all, men's earnings increase and women's decrease when they have children. However, equally plausible is the argument that these trends result from the cultural norms that sway potentially high-earning women toward home rather than toward work. An additional explanation is that some women simply enjoy and believe that they are well-suited for family caregiving.

The differential distribution of household work has significant implications. For example, most married mothers become economically dependent on their husbands, but the law does not grant them financial equality in marriage. This means that, in the case of divorce, mothers experience a dramatic drop in income. Moreover, the social safety net does not protect divorced or single mothers from poverty, and mothers are not eligible for unemployment insurance if they work part-time or at home. Clearly, the unequal distribution of housework and childcare has meaningful implications and warrants some discussion.

The family factor, especially for married women, is one of the reasons that leads to more mobile inclination for women than men in job market. The stereotype forces married women to undertake more family responsibilities than men, so women have no choice but to relocate workplaces for fulfilling the family needs. Compared with men who have more freedom to decide their workplaces, to move frequently in working system is obvious a disadvantage for women to improve their positions or to earn more income. On the other hand, men are more willing to relocate workplaces when their wives have better income, but not their wives' careers themselves, which means the power in family can also be transferred through women create more economic value than their husbands. This is the progress for women to develop their careers in recent years. Another source describes the variety of women's careers in their lifetime as "snake-like", meaning they move from job to job through their whole career lives flexibly. Compared with challenge of flexibility, this research provides a new idea that some women actually gain benefits by developing their own business to fulfill family needs.

== See also ==
- Gender equality
- Gender inequality
- Gender polarization
- Gender pay gap in the United States
- Menopause in the workplace
- Racial equality
- Racism
- Occupational sexism
- Social stratification
- Sexual harassment in the workplace in the United States
- Motherhood penalty
