= List of LGBTQ Catholics =

There have been a number of LGBTQ Catholics throughout history.

== Artists ==
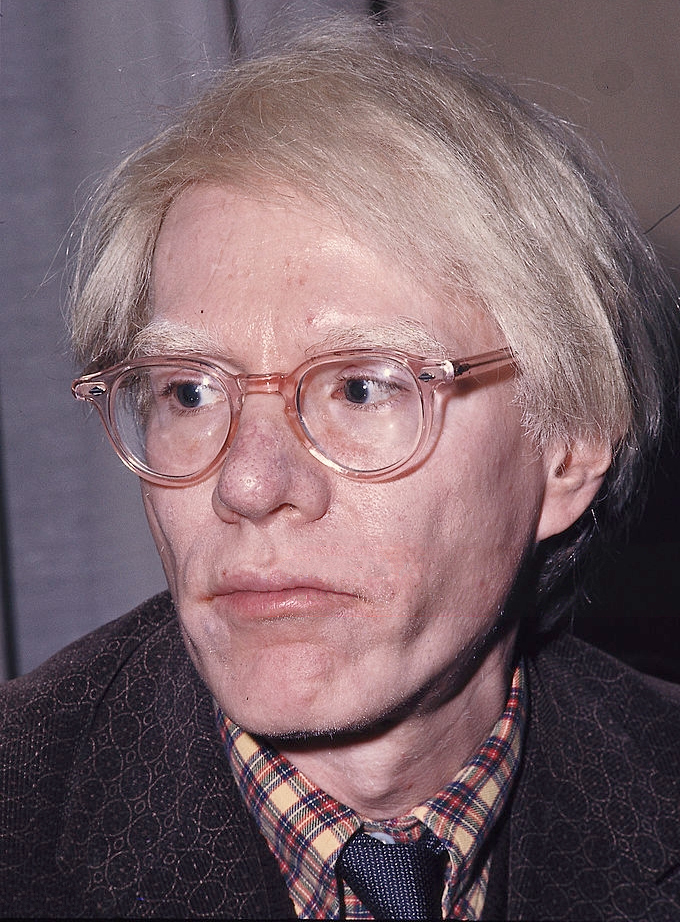
Andy Warhol, who was gay, was a practicing Catholic.

- A number of influential Italian Catholic artists of the Renaissance and the Baroque who were notable for their religious paintings and sculpture were considered to have been homosexual or bisexual. These include Donatello, Sandro Botticelli, Leonardo da Vinci and Michelangelo Merisi da Caravaggio. In addition, Michelangelo Buonarroti was noted for painting the ceiling of the Sistine Chapel, under which popes are elected to this day.
- Andy Warhol was an American artist who was a leading figure in the visual art movement known as pop art, and whose homosexuality strongly influenced his work. He was a Ruthenian Catholic and regularly volunteered at homeless shelters in New York to practice his faith. He described himself as a religious person and regularly attended mass.
- Robert Mapplethorpe (1946–89) was an American photographer. From 1977 until 1980, Mapplethorpe was the lover of gay writer and Drummer magazine editor Jack Fritscher. He was brought up in a Roman Catholic household and although he later "lapsed" from practicing the religion, he created art suffused with Catholicism – particularly in the areas of Catholic guilt and eroticism.

== Politicians and royalty ==
=== Politicians ===
- Pim Fortuyn (1948-2002), Dutch politician and civil servant was gay, stating in a 2002 interview that he was Catholic.
- Ruth Hunt (b. 1980) is Chief Executive of leading UK-based lesbian, gay and bisexual equality organisation Stonewall, the largest gay equality body in Europe. She was formerly President of the Oxford University Student Union. Hunt is a practicing Roman Catholic and has spoken out in favour of bridging the gap between faith leaders and LGBT communities.
- Stefan Kaufmann (born 1969) is a German politician and member of the Christian Democratic Union (CDU). He is gay, and a devout practising Catholic.
- Daniel Kawczynski (born 1972), Polish-born British Member of Parliament. A practising Catholic, he came out in 2013 and is in a same-sex civil partnership.
- Jens Spahn (born 1980), German politician, former Federal Minister of Health. Spahn is a self-described Roman Catholic although he has stated publicly that he has problems with the Catholic Church and its sexual morality. He lives with his husband Daniel Funke, a German journalist and lobbyist, in Berlin's Schöneberg district. In December 2017, the two married in a civil ceremony at Borbeck Palace in Essen, officiated by the city's mayor Thomas Kufen.
- Klaus Wowereit (born 1953), German politician, former mayor of Berlin. He came out as gay, by declaring in the by now famous statement: "Ich bin schwul und das ist auch gut so!" ("I am gay and that's a good thing, too!").
- Sean Patrick Maloney (born 1966), American politician, U.S. representative from New York's 18th congressional district from 2013 to 2023 and former DCCC chair.
- Robert Garcia (born 1977), Peruvian-born American politician, member of the Democratic Party, U.S. representative from California's 42nd congressional district since 2023 and 28th Mayor of Long Beach from 2014 to 2022.
- Geraldine Roman (born 1967), Filipina politician and journalist, Representative of Bataan's 1st district since 2016. She is the first transgender person elected to the Congress of the Philippines.
- Sepp Müller (born 1989), German politician, member of the Bundestag (CDU)
- Wolfgang Stefinger (born 1985), German politician, member of the Bundestag (CSU)

=== Royalty ===
- Queen Christina of Sweden (1626 – 1689) reigned from 1632 before her abdication in 1654. Modern biographers generally consider her to have been a lesbian, and her affairs with women were noted during her lifetime. She was a prominent convert to Catholicism in 1654 and is one of only 6 women to be buried in the crypt of St. Peters Basilica in Rome.
- Prince Eugene of Savoy (1663 – 1736), the military commander of the Catholic Imperial forces in the Holy Roman Empire, was predominantly homosexual.
- King Ludwig II (1845 – 1886) was monarch of the Catholic Kingdom of Bavaria from 1864 until his death; it is known from his diary and private letters that he had strong homosexual desires which he tried to suppress. He remained a devout Catholic throughout his life and attended services regularly; building chapels for prayer within his castles, and commissioning religious art.
- King Umberto II of Italy was an intense Catholic, described by his biographer Domenico Bartoli as "almost to the point of fanaticism", but he was unable to resist what he called his "satanic" homosexual urges.

== Clergy, religious, and theologians ==
- Antonio Barberini (1607 – 1671) was an Italian Catholic cardinal, Archbishop of Reims, military leader, patron of the arts and a prominent member of the House of Barberini. He was bisexual.
- Carlo Carafa (1517 – 1561) was a Roman Catholic cardinal, and all-powerful favourite and Cardinal Nephew of Pope Paul IV Carafa, whose policies he directed and whom he served as papal legate in Paris, Venice and Brussels. He was convicted of a number of crimes, including homosexual sodomy, and executed.
- Benedetta Carlini (1591 – 1660) was the abbess of the Convent of the Mother of God in Pescia, who shared her cell with Sister Bartolomea. When the two nuns had sex, Sister Benedetta said she experienced mystical visions and angelic possession. The church authorities investigated the mystical experiences and, upon discovering her lesbian sexuality, stripped Carlini of her position as abbess and held her under guard for the remainder of her life.
- Frederick William Faber - (1814 - 1863) described by Kirstie Blair as suffering a 'failure of reserve'.
- Jean O'Leary (1948 – 2005) was an American lesbian and gay rights activist. She was the founder of Lesbian Feminist Liberation, one of the first lesbian activist groups in the women's movement, and an early member and co-director of the National Gay and Lesbian Task Force. She co-founded National Coming Out Day. Before becoming a lesbian and gay rights activist she was a Roman Catholic religious sister. She would later write about her experience in the 1985 anthology, Lesbian Nuns: Breaking Silence.
- Francis Joseph Spellman (1889 – 1967) was an American bishop and cardinal. From 1939 until his death in 1967, he served as the sixth Archbishop of New York. FBI files suggested that Spellman was an active, if covert, homosexual.
- Robert Carter was one of the first gay priests to publicly come out as gay. He co-founded the LGBT advocacy group the National Gay and Lesbian Task Force.
- Mychal Judge, O.F.M. (aka Michael Fallon Judge, May 11, 1933 – September 11, 2001), was a Franciscan friar and Catholic priest who served as a chaplain to the New York City Fire Department. It was while serving in that capacity that he was killed, becoming the first certified fatality of the September 11, 2001 attacks.
- Jose Mantero (born 1963) was the first out gay priest in Spain.
- John J. McNeill (September 2, 1925 – September 22, 2015) was ordained as a Jesuit priest in 1959 and subsequently worked as a psychotherapist and an academic theologian, with a particular reputation within the field of queer theology.
- Bernard Lynch became the first Catholic priest in the world to undertake a civil partnership in 2006 in the Republic of Ireland (he had previously had his relationship blessed in a ceremony in 1998 by an American Cistercian monk). He was subsequently expelled from his religious order in 2011, and went on to legally wed his husband in 2016.
- James Alison, Roman-Catholic priest in United Kingdom and Spain
- William Hart McNichols, Roman-Catholic priest in New York City
- David Berger is a German theologian and former professor of the Pontifical Academy of St. Thomas Aquinas in Rome. His licence to teach religion was revoked by the Catholic Church. Until 2015 he was the editor of the gay periodical MÄNNER (Berlin), and has written about his experiences as a gay theologian.
- Daniel A. Helminiak (b. 1942) is an American Catholic priest, theologian and author. He is currently a professor in the Department of Humanistic and Transpersonal Psychology at the University of West Georgia, near Atlanta. From 1975 to 1978, he served as teaching assistant to Bernard Lonergan, S.J. (1904–1984), the philosopher, theologian, economist, and methodologist whom Newsweek styled the Thomas Aquinas of the 20th century.
- Krzysztof Charamsa (born 5 August 1972) a Polish Catholic theologian and author. In 2015, after declaring he was homosexual and in a relationship, he was suspended from his position as a Catholic priest and removed from several previous posts in the Roman Curia.

== Writers and academics ==
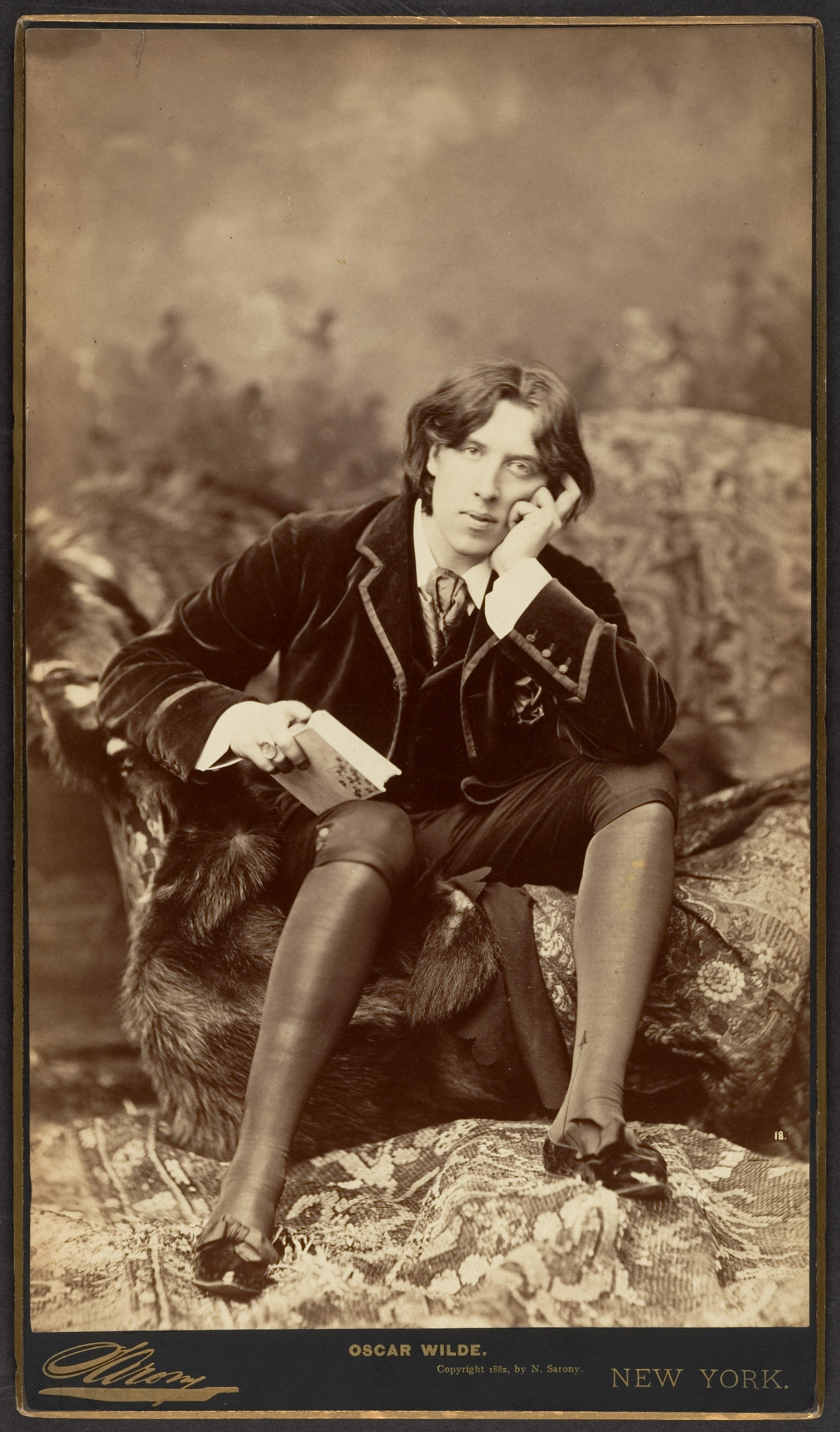
Oscar Wilde, convicted by Britain for homosexual acts, converted to Catholicism on his deathbed.

- In Britain, a number of late 19th-century authors who converted to Catholicism were gay or bisexual, among them Oscar Wilde, Gerard Manley Hopkins, Lord Alfred Douglas, Marc-André Raffalovich, Robert Hugh Benson, Frederick Rolfe, John Gray, and Siegfried Sassoon. These male writers sometimes found, in their Catholicism, a means of writing about their attraction to and desire for relationships with other men. Wilde had Catholic tendencies throughout his life and converted on his deathbed. He wrote about himself in De Profundis, during his imprisonment and hard labor, as akin to Christ embodying suffering, and invoked Christ's transformative power for the oppressed. Wilde's sometime lover, the poet John Gray, was Catholic. Raffalovich compared the physicality and the ecstasy of devotion to Christ to same-sex erotic desire. Hopkins's work was strongly marked by physicality and eroticism in its religious references, and the poet, who was reminded of Christ by other men whom he found beautiful, dwelt on the physicality of Christ's body and intimacy of his comfort and love.
- John Boswell was a prominent historian and a professor at Yale University, and gay. Many of Boswell's studies focused on the issue of religion and homosexuality, specifically Christianity and homosexuality.
- Radclyffe Hall, author of The Well of Loneliness, was also a convert to Catholicism. Joanne Glasgow writes that for Hall and other lesbians of the early twentieth century, such as Alice B. Toklas, the church's erasure of female sexuality offered a cover for lesbianism.
- Brian McNaught is a corporate diversity and sensitivity coach and author who specializes in LGBT issues in the workplace.
- Marcel Proust was one of the first European novelists to feature homosexuality openly and at length in his writings and was considered to have been homosexual.
- Eve Tushnet is a lesbian Catholic author and blogger. She converted to Catholicism in 1998, and chooses to be celibate in accordance with the Catholic Church's ban on sex outside heterosexual marriage.
- Tennessee Williams was an American playwright who created many works that have become stage classics. He believed that his work was full of deep Christian symbolism, and admitted loving "the beauty of the ritual in the Mass", yet nevertheless thought the tenets of the Roman Catholic church to be "ridiculous".
- Evelyn Waugh, author of Brideshead Revisited, had homosexual relationships with Hugh Lygon and Alastair Hugh Graham, among others. Waugh converted to Catholicism in 1930.
- Milo Yiannopoulos is a British political commentator, media personality, blogger, journalist and author associated politically with the alt-right. He is a practicing Catholic and gay man. In March 2021, during an interview with right-wing publication LifeSiteNews, Yiannopoulos claimed to be "ex-gay" and stated his husband had been "demoted to housemate".
- Alan Bray

== Singers and musicians ==
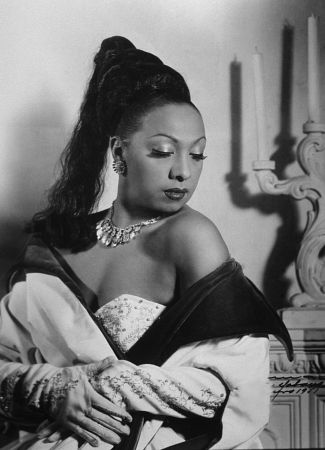
Josephine Baker, bisexual singer and convert to Catholicism

- Josephine Baker was the first black woman to star in a major motion picture, or to become a world-famous entertainer. She was bisexual, having had relationships with men and women.
- Jeanine Deckers (d. 1985) was known as The Singing Nun or Sœur Sourire. She was a Belgian singer-songwriter and was at one time a member of the Dominican Order. After leaving the order, she remained a practicing Catholic. Some 14 years later, she began a lesbian relationship with a lifelong friend.
- American country music singer Steve Grand is openly gay and a practicing Catholic.
- Lady Gaga.
- The pianist and entertainer Liberace was recognized during his career with two Emmy Awards, six gold albums and two stars on the Hollywood Walk of Fame. He had a four-year relationship with Scott Thorson. Described as a devout Catholic, he was received in a private audience by Pope Pius XII.
- The Lebanese-British singer-songwriter Mika has acknowledged his Melkite Catholic upbringing but has written about his conflicting relationship with the Catholic Church and its stance on homosexuality in his music. He still considers himself Catholic and has indicated that his song "The Origin of Love" is about religion. "It's about the Roman Catholic Church, which I love dearly – even though I'm not a bigot and I'm not in denial of the human condition. Yet, at the same time, it's a very strange thing, 'cause I'm very respectful of that world."
- Danny La Rue was raised Roman Catholic and was buried in St Mary's Catholic cemetery in London.
- The Italian composer and dancer Jean-Baptiste Lully (1632-87) was involved in a number of homosexual scandals at the court of Louis XIV.
- The musician Ricky Martin has sold over 70 million albums and has had 95 platinum records.
- Vaslav Nijinsky was a Russian ballet dancer and choreographer of Polish descent, cited as the greatest male dancer of the early 20th century. He was romantically involved with Sergei Diaghilev.
- Francis Poulenc was a French composer and pianist. He was predominantly gay, yet struggled with his sexuality. Following the death of a close friend in the 1930s, he rediscovered his Roman Catholic faith and replaced the ironic nature of neo-classicism with a new-found spiritual depth.

== Actors and directors ==
- Pedro Almodóvar (b. 1949) is a Spanish film director, screenwriter, producer and former actor who was reared as Catholic. He is openly gay. Many of his films contain strong Catholic imagery. His film Dark Habits (1983) features a mother superior in a convent who is also a lesbian. The 2004 film Bad Education deals with the theme of the sexual abuse of children at the hands of Catholic priests.
- Raymond Choo Kong (1949 – 2019), Trinidadian stage director and producer
- Jean Cocteau (1889–1963) was a celebrated French writer, designer, playwright, artist and filmmaker. After a long absence from the Church, he returned to practicing his Catholic faith in his later years; he was known to be very devout. He designed and painted murals for the Church of Notre Dame de France in London.
- Josie Totah (b. 2001) is an American actress. She publicly came out as a transgender woman in 2018. Raised in the Catholic faith and educated at a Catholic school, she has been described as considering herself “semi-religious.” She is known for Champions, Saved by the Bell reboot,The Buccaneers and Carrie.
- Lucio Dalla (1943–2012) was a popular Italian singer-songwriter, musician and actor. He was outed as gay after his death (having had a long-term partner, Marco Alemanno). He was a practicing Roman Catholic, and was given a funeral mass in San Petronio Basilica at Bologna.
- Ramon Novarro (1899–1968), Mexican-born United States film, stage and television actor
- Tab Hunter (1931–2018), American actor, singer, film producer and author. He appeared in over 40 films and was a well-known Hollywood star and heartthrob of the 1950s and 1960s, known for his blond, clean-cut good looks. In a 2015 interview, he mentioned his religion being a very important part of his life.
- Rock Hudson (1925-1985) American actor of the Golden Age of Hollywood. Raised Catholic, later identified as atheist. A week before his death, he made a deathbed confession, received communion, and was administered the last rites.
- Pier Paolo Pasolini (1922–1975) was an Italian film director, poet, writer and intellectual. He was openly gay. He described himself as a "Catholic Marxist", although elsewhere he insisted he was an atheist. His film The Gospel According to St. Matthew, an account of the New Testament story, part-financed by the Catholic Church, and dedicated to "the dear, joyous, familiar memory of Pope John XXIII". It portrayed Jesus as a barefoot peasant of the people. The film won the Grand Prize at the International Catholic Film Office.
- Franco Zeffirelli (1923–2019) was an Italian director and producer of films and television. He was a practicing Catholic who believed that "Catholicism is the only [religion] that comprehensively meets the needs of mankind." He spoke about the making of the film Jesus of Nazareth as representing an important turning point – giving him "the opportunity to draw closer to the mystery of Christ". He was given a funeral mass in Florence Cathedral.

== See also ==
- Catholic teaching on homosexuality
- History of the Catholic Church and homosexuality
- DignityUSA
