= Enid Dame =

American poet

Enid Dame (June 28, 1943, Beaver Falls, Pennsylvania – December 25, 2003) was an American poet, fiction writer, teacher, editor, and publisher.

== Life ==
Dame was born Enid Sue Jacobs to Morton and Bernice Jacobs, middle-class Baltimore Jewish artists, who inspired her artistic sensitivity and political activity. She received a Bachelor's degree from Towson State College, Maryland, Master's from City College of New York, and Ph.D from Rutgers University. By 1967 she was an anti-Vietnam War activist, and in 1969, according to QLF activist Barbara de Lamere, she participated in the demonstration on the second day of Stonewall Riots.

For many years, she and her husband, poet Donald Lev, lived in Brooklyn and in High Falls, New York, where they edited and published the literary tabloid Home Planet News founded in 1979. She was on the faculty of the New Jersey Institute of Technology and Rutgers University in New Brunswick, where she served as associate director of the Writing Program.

Dame was one of several poets considered for Poet Laureate of Brooklyn in 1995 after Norman Rosten's death, but the title went to Dennis Nurkse.

Dame's poems explored themes of urban life, Jewish history and identity, and political activism. She examined contemporary women's lives in persona poems that take on the voice of Eve, Lilith, or other woman from Jewish tradition. These poems often locate a kernel of feminist rebellion in familiar Biblical stories. She was a member of the Editorial Collective of Jewish feminist magazine Bridges. The 2007 anthology Broken Land: Poems of Brooklyn, edited by Julia Kasdorf and Michael Tyrell, was dedicated to her memory. Jeanne Marie Beaumont endowed the Academy of American Poets with Enid Dame Memorial Poetry Prize, awarded to the best undergraduate poem.

== Works ==
- Riding the D Train
- On the Road to Damascus, Maryland
- Lilith
- Lilith's New Career
- Lilith and Her Demons
- Dream Wedding
- Anything You Don't See
