= Ginny Vida =

American editor (born 1939)

- Born: 1939 (age 86–87); Chicago, Illinois
- Occupations: Editor, educator, community leader
- Known for: Media director, National Gay Task Force (1976–2000)
- Notable work: Our Right to Love (1978)
- Awards: Stonewall Book Award (1978)

Virginia E. "Ginny" Vida (born 1939) is an American editor and community leader, best known for editing Our Right to Love: A Lesbian Resource Book (1978), and as media director of the National Gay Task Force (NGTF) in the 1970s. She was also deputy director of the New York City Commission on the Status of Women, and chair of the Ethics Commission in San Francisco, before she retired in 2004.

== Early life and education ==
Vida was born in Chicago and raised in Macomb, Illinois, the daughter of Paul Vida and Eleanor O. Vida. Her father was born in Hungary. She had an older brother, Lee (1934–2016), who became an ophthalmologist. She earned a bachelor's degree in English from the University of Illinois in 1961, and a master's degree in English linguistics from New York University in 1966.

== Career ==
Vida was a teacher as a young woman, and edited school textbooks. In 1973 and 1974 she was active in the Jean O'Leary-led Lesbian Feminist Liberation, an offshoot of the Gay Activists Alliance.

Vida was the media director of the National Gay Task Force from 1976 to 1980. She edited the national organization's newsletter, It's Time, and worked for "accurate news coverage and positive portrayals and lesbians and gay men" in film, radio, and television. She also worked on public education campaigns for the task force, countering the anti-gay activism of Anita Bryant and others. Her efforts persuaded ABC to make A Question of Love, a 1978 television movie starring Jane Alexander and Gena Rowlands as a lesbian couple in a custody dispute with an ex-husband, based on a memoir by Mary Jo Risher.

Vida compiled Our Right to Love: A Lesbian Resource Book (1978), developing reference articles and extensive lists and reviews of organizations, publications, bars, and social services of interest to lesbians. The book sold well and won awards including the 1978 Stonewall Book Award from the American Library Association. An updated and expanded version, The New Our Right to Love, was co-edited by Vida and published in 1996.

In the 1980s and 1990s, she worked in the New York State Division of Human Rights, and was deputy director of the New York City Commission on the Status of Women. In 1997 Vida became director of the Ethics Commission in San Francisco, responsible for auditing campaigns and advising on city laws involving campaign finance. She retired for health reasons in 2004.

== Publications ==
- "Statement on Sex and Violence in Television" (1976)
- "They Don't Want to Know We Exist" (1977)
- Our Right to Love: A Lesbian Resource Book (1978)
- The New Our Right to Love: A Lesbian Resource Book (1996, with Karol D. Lightner and Tanya Viger)
