= William Wynkoop =

William Magee Wynkoop (January 26, 1916 – May 24, 2003) and Percy Roy Strickland (April 30, 1918 – July 28, 2003) were a longtime gay couple active with Services & Advocacy for GLBT Elders (SAGE), an organization for improving the lives of LGBT older adults.

== Early life ==
Wynkoop was born in Manasquan, New Jersey. He graduated from Dartmouth College in 1938. After serving in Europe as an Army medic during World War II, Wynkoop attended Columbia University and obtained a master's in English.

Strickland was born in Huntington, New York. In 1938, after graduating from high school, he worked at a beach club in Huntington. When Strickland was a young adult, his sister sent him to a doctor who practiced conversion therapy; she came to accept his orientation after the treatment failed to change it. From 1941 to 1945 he worked at Grunman Aircraft. After World War II, he moved to New York City and got a job in display at R. H. Macy, later moving on to McCreery's and Lord & Taylor.

== Career ==
Wynkoop at first taught at Wayne State, Detroit, and Strickland took a job in Cleveland, Ohio, so that they could meet on the weekends. After the couple returned to New York City, Wynkoop taught first at Adelphi University and then at Rutgers University. Wynkoop retired in 1979.

Strickland was the manager of a florist shop on the Upper East Side, Manhattan, catering to celebrities and well-to-do people. Strickland retired in 1998.

== Activism ==
In 1952 Wynkoop and Strickland accompanied Edward Sagarin, the author of the 1951 book The Homosexual in America: A Subjective Approach, to a meeting of the Veterans Benevolent Association, one of the first gay groups in New York City.

Wynkoop and Strickland were active in many gay organizations, especially SAGE; they also spoke to young gay men at the Hetrick-Martin Institute, Green Chimneys, Cornell University, and conventions.

Already back in 1988, Wynkoop and Strickland were giving interviews as a longterm, "married", couple.

In May 1996 Wynkoop was feature in an article on PlanSponsor Magazine Portrait of a Retiree: William Magee Wynkoop; the article focused on Wynkoop's 46 year relationship with Strickland, highlighting the fact that Wynkoop "will not be able to leave any benefits to his life partner".

On June 16, 1996, Wynkoop and Strickland participated to the "Great Wed-In" in Bryant Park when Tom Duane, an openly gay councilman, married many gay couples. On the stage with them also were a woman rabbi from Beit Simchat Torah; Reverend Pat Bumgardner, the pastor of the Metropolitan Community Church of New York; and Dr. Robert Williams, the pastor at the Marble Collegiate Church. The day after, on June 17, they were married again by Dr. Williams at the Marble Collegiate Church on Fifth Avenue.

Until 1998 Strickland volunteered in the flower program at the Memorial Sloan Kettering Cancer Center and at the Associated Blind on West 23rd Street.

== Personal life ==
Wynkoop and Strickland met by chance on December 19, 1949, in Washington Square Park, Greenwich Village.

On March 3, 1993, Wynkoop and Strickland registered their "domestic partnership".

"We have a full life," said Wynkoop. "I could not imagine my life without him," said Strickland. "Neither could I," said Wynkoop. They both died in 2003, 2 months apart, William 87 and Roy 85, after living together for more than 53 years. They are buried together at Greenwood Cemetery, Brielle, New Jersey.

== Legacy ==
William Wynkoop and Roy Strickland are featured in Longtime Companions: Autobiographies of Gay Male Fidelity published in 1999.
