= Women's Liberation Center =

Historic women's building in New York City

- U.S. National Register of Historic Places
- New York State Register of Historic Places
- New York City Landmark
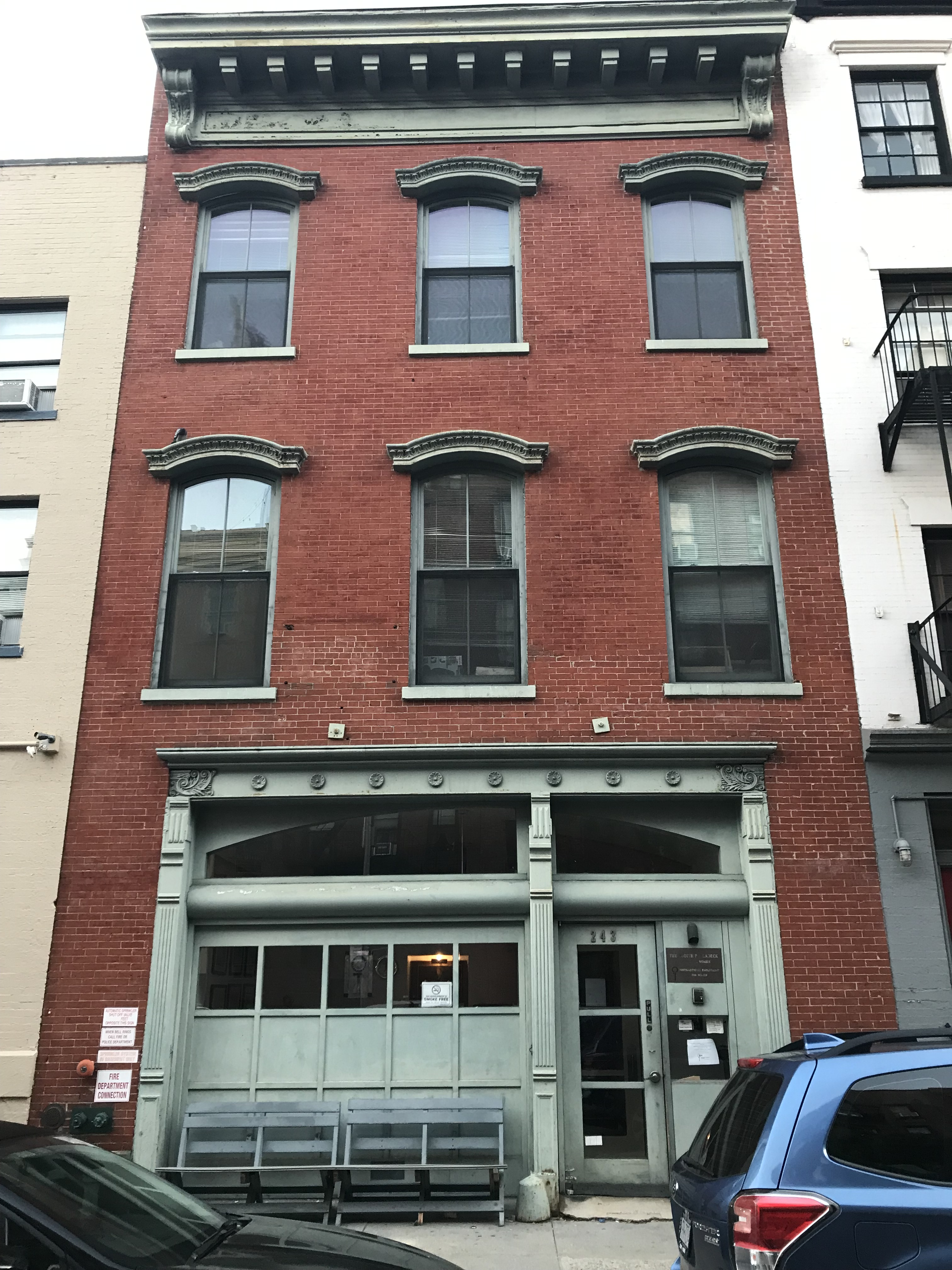
- Motto: Sisterhood is Powerful

- Location within Manhattan Location within New York City Location within New York Location within the United States
- Location: 243 West 20th Street; New York, New York 10011
- Coordinates: 40°44′35″N 73°59′56″W
- Area: Chelsea
- Built: 1866
- Architect: Charles E. Hartshorn
- Organization type: Community building
- Architectural style: Italianate
- Restored: 1994
- Restored by: Barbara Neski
- NRHP reference No.: 100006509
- NYSRHP No.: 06101.020930
- NYCL No.: 2633

Significant dates
- Added to NRHP: May 17, 2021
- Designated NYSRHP: March 11, 2021
- Designated NYCL: June 18, 2019

The Women's Liberation Center (WLC) is a historic building and former organization in the Chelsea neighborhood of Manhattan, New York City, New York. The organization served as a nexus for second-wave feminism, especially the women's liberation and lesbian feminist movements. The group operated from 1972 to 1987, where it was also known as the Women's Firehouse.

The building also has a long history before and after that period. The 1866 structure originally served as a firehouse for the Hook and Ladder Company No. 12. In the mid-1980s the Nontraditional Employment for Women moved into the building, where they continue to provide pre-apprenticeships for women beginning careers with construction labor unions.

== History ==
=== Firehouse ===
The Volunteer Engine Company No. 50 began on operating on the site around 1854, but the state disbanded that group after 1864 with the creation of the professional Metropolitan Fire Department. Hook and Ladder Company No. 12 began operating in the same location around 1866 in a new building which then became part of the municipal Fire Department City of New York in 1870. The firefighters originally stabled a horse-drawn fire wagon. While the city originally planned to sell the surplus building after it closed in 1967, it sat vacant for the next five years.

=== Women's Liberation Center ===
==== Establishment ====
The Women's Liberation Center began in 1970 as part of the "women's lib" movement within second-wave feminism. The group initially rented a space on 22nd Street with funds raised following a sit-in at the Ladies' Home Journal. It originally held no formal officers and offered space for women to meet with an initial focus on abortion access. The WLC moved into "The Women's Firehouse" in 1972 with the city initially charging rent of only $1 per month (equivalent to $8 in 2025).

The center engaged in a number of activities including holding a rummage sale to support the Equal Rights Amendment, provided a directory of professional services offered by other women, raising bail money for Black Panther activist Joan Bird, hosting a feminist lending library, and providing referrals to other organizations. Increasingly, the emphasis shifted to lesbian contributions to the women's movement.

==== Affiliated groups ====
The building served as an incubator for a wide variety of feminist organizations. These included Older Women's Liberation providing senior services, Up From Under giving women housing counseling, New York Feminist Credit Union increasing women's access to credit, Victoria Woodhull Marching Band adding music to events, Women on Our Own providing job training, Creative Women's Collective offering art therapy, and Women's Health and Abortion Project giving referrals for out of state women to receive abortions in New York, prior to Roe v. Wade.

The WLC became a hub of lesbian activist groups in particular. These included the Lesbian Switchboard counseling hotline, Radicalesbians Health Collective, Dykes Opposed to Nuclear Energy, Black Lesbian Caucus, Lesbian Lifespace Project, and the Lesbian Food Conspiracy buying cooperative. The Disabled Lesbian Alliance successfully pushed for more events to be held on the first floor of the building to increase accessibility.

The most prominent of the groups was the Lesbian Feminist Liberation (LFL), which broke off from the Gay Activists Alliance to protest their misogyny. The sexism there was pervasive, including expecting women to make the coffee at meetings. Under the leadership of Jean O'Leary, the group worked to ensure that lesbians were heard at political and pride marches.

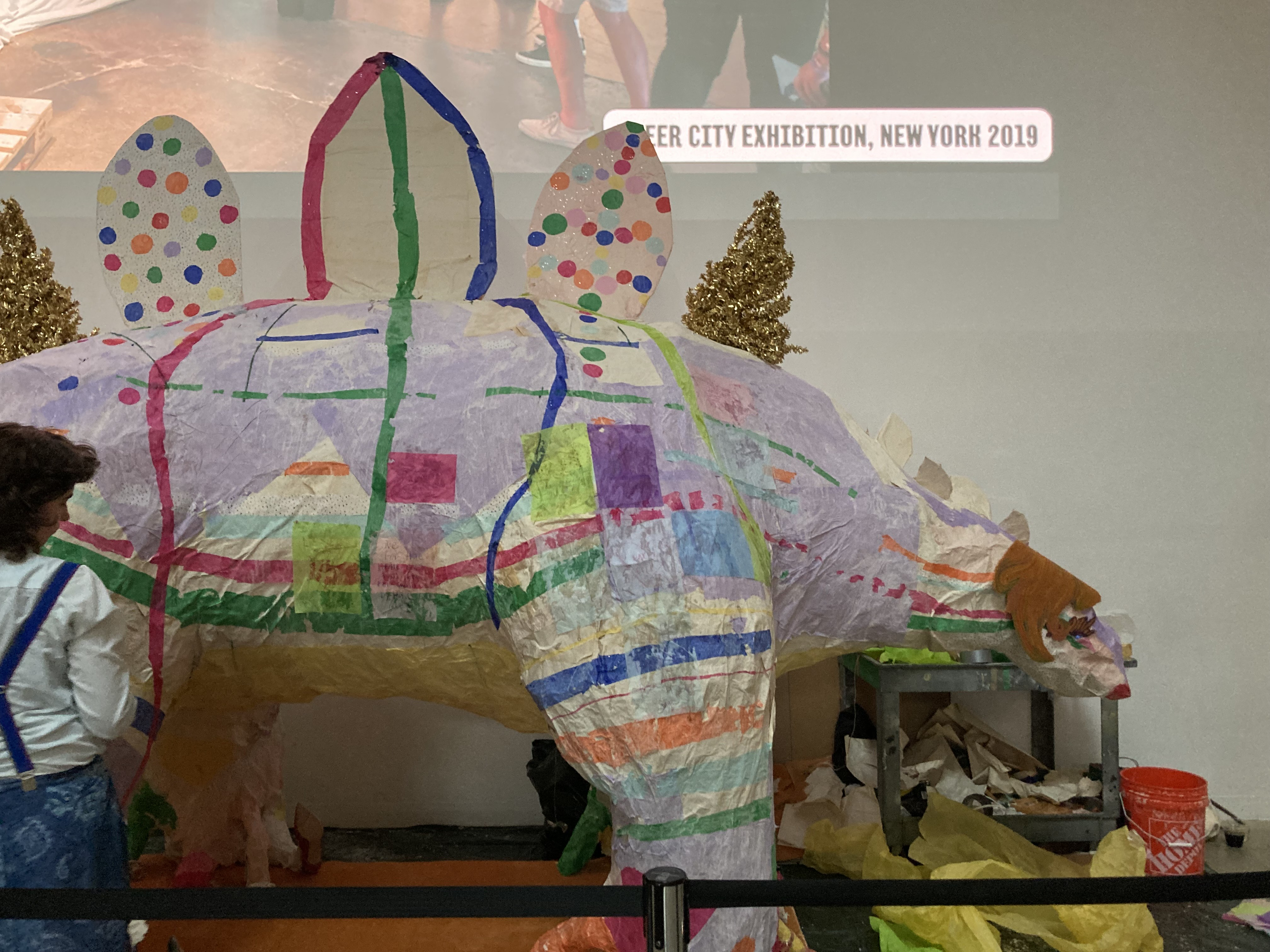
Recreation of Sapphosaura at the American Museum of Natural History in 2025, by Anna Moustakerski & Teagan Hoey

Groups at the center coordinated a number of protests. These included the Women's Anti‐Rape Group picketing when a serial rapist received a plea bargain for robbery and Bitch staging a man ogling sessions on Wall Street. LFL protested the American Museum of Natural History's negative portrayal of women in dioramas with a large papier-mâché lavender dinosaur named "Sapphasaura".

==== Decline ====
Several factors led to the organization's decline in the 1980s. The city raised the rent as the center's president Cheryl Adams unsuccessfully sought new tenants to offset those costs. Starting with the Lesbian Switchboard, the lesbian groups moved to the Lesbian and Gay Community Services Center (LGCSS). This coincided with a broader lesbian movement away from the women's movement to focus on queer alliances. There were also practical considerations as the LGCSS was three times the size of the WLC and gay men's greater wealth allowed for paid full-time staff. The Women's Liberation Center closed in 1987.

=== Nontraditional Employment for Women ===
The Nontraditional Employment for Women (NEW) began in 1978 and moved into the building in the mid-1980s, signing a 35-year lease with the city. The group prepares women for union jobs in the building trades, including with green workforce development.

The organization's pre-apprenticeship programs help women in lower paying pink-collar professions gain entrance into higher paying blue-collar careers. Once hired, union contracts ensure equal pay for equal work. NEW maintains a track record of helping women to leave public assistance by becoming financially self-sufficient. The city has maintained ownership throughout as the landlord.

== Architecture ==
Architect Charles E. Hartshorn originally designed building as a firehouse. He used Italianate architecture styling for the three-story building completed in 1866, although it may incorporate elements from an earlier 1854 volunteer fire hall on the same site.

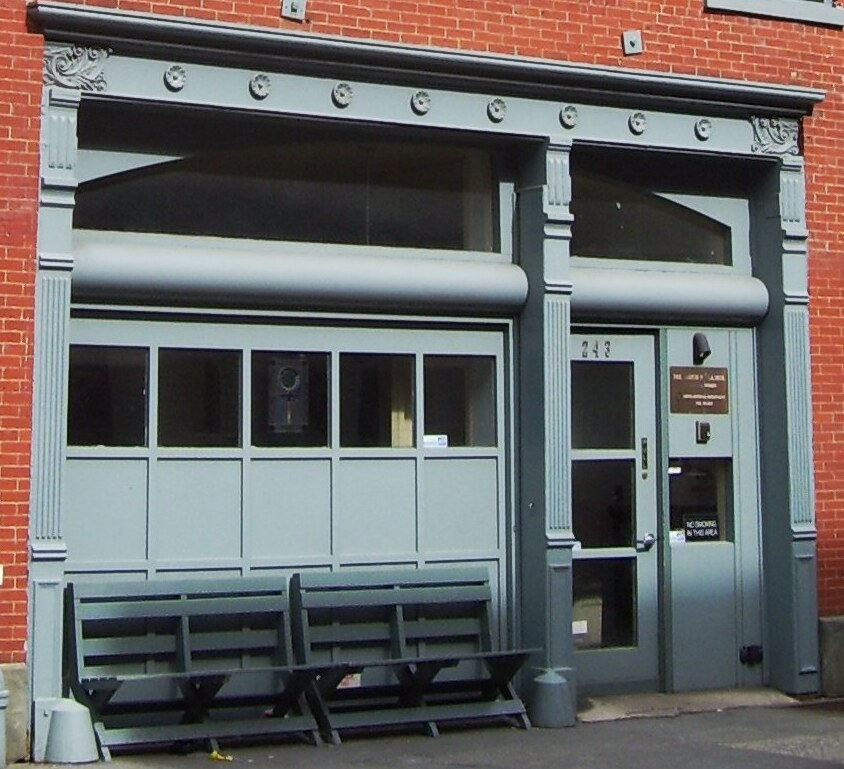
First-floor enframement with a vehicular (left) and pedestrian (right) entrances

The front facade is red brick laid in common bond forming three bays. The first-floor entrances consist of a painted cast-iron enframement with the wider vehicular entrance on the left and the narrower pedestrian entrance on the right. Three cast-iron pilasters provide vertical separation and consist of paneled bases, fluted shafts, blank friezes, and fluted capitals. A lintel covers the top of the entrance with eight rosettes and acanthus leaves on each end. While the 1994 renovation replaced the original vehicle doors, new windows approximate their look with an arched glass transom above. Two metal attachments in the brick once held the firehouse sign. The upper stories each have three windows with crowned cornices. The third story windows are slightly shorter than second story ones to emphasize the height of the building. The roofline contains a projecting sheet metal cornices with modillions and elongated brackets on each end with acanthus leaves. The interior configuration for the fire station consisted of fire engine storage on the first floor, offices and a kitchen on the second, and a dormitory on the third.

Buildings for marginalized groups are often re-used because they cannot afford to construct purpose-build structures, which is the case here. The WLC prioritized inexpensive and flexible space so that organizations could share ideas and women could receive coordinated services. The group updated the space with volunteers by reconfiguring the interior so that the first floor held a reception area and food coop, the second held meetings, and the third became a karate and dance studio. In the basement, the women shoveled coal to heat the drafty building.

Nontraditional Employment for Women more extensively renovated the building with a $1 million project in 1994 (equivalent to $2.17 million in 2025). Architect Barbara Neski's design retained the facade but replaced the exterior doors and completely renovated the interior and, once again, the project used labor from the women on site. The basement is now usable and contains a workshop with tools, the first floor has a reception area and fitness room, the second continues to have a kitchen and office space, while the third classrooms. The building is now well heated.

=== Heritage registers ===
A local historical association, the NYC LGBT Historic Sites Project, began efforts to preserve and raise awareness of the WLC and other sites. In 2016, the group created a mobile app for self-guided walking tours that included the building. In 2019, the New York City Landmarks Preservation Commission listed the WLC on the 50th anniversary of the Stonewall uprising. In 2021, the National Register of Historic Places followed suit and listed the building.

== See also ==
- List of New York City Designated Landmarks in Manhattan from 14th to 59th Streets
- National Register of Historic Places listings in Manhattan from 14th to 59th Streets
