= Barbara Neski =

American architect (1928–2025)

Barbara Neski (née Goldberg; January 13, 1928 – March 23, 2025) was an American architect who co-founded the architectural firm Neski Associates with her husband, Julian Neski, in New York City. Neski died on March 23, 2025, at the age of 97.

== Education ==
Neski grew up in Highland Park, New Jersey. She received her undergraduate degree from Bennington College in 1949. During her third semester there, she became aware of the nearby Robinson House, in Williamstown, Massachusetts, which Marcel Breuer had designed. It inspired her, suggesting what domestic architecture could be. She went on to earn her Masters of Architecture (M.Arch.) at Harvard University's Graduate School of Design, then directed by Walter Gropius. She found that being a woman in the M.Arch. program was viewed as an “oddity," often not taken seriously. For example, at least one professor, Hugh Stubbins, would completely “ignore [her]” during individual "desk crits" (one-on-one faculty critiques of student work in progress), "not even look[ing] at [her] drawings.”

== Early career ==
In 1952, Neski began working in the office of architect José Luis Sert, helping design urban plans for the Latin-American cities of Bogotá, Colombia, and Havana, Cuba. At Sert's office, she met Julian Neski, her future design partner and husband, whom she married in 1954. They moved together to architect Marcel Breuer's office, where she helped develop plans for a factory in Canada, a house in Connecticut, and a library for Hunter College, in New York City. In 1959, the Neskis collaborated on the American National Exhibition in Moscow with an American design team that included Peter Blake, Buckminster Fuller, and Charles and Ray Eames.

== Neski Associates ==
In the early 1960s, the couple started its own firm and designed more than 35 houses, 25 of them in the Hamptons, NY. Their practice was one of equals with both husband and wife participating fully in all aspects of the work. They became known for their modernist vacation homes. The Neskis kept their office small, in part to better manage all aspects of the work, enabling them to have direct involvement in each project. Barbara Neski taught at Pratt Institute between 1978 and 1992 and became a Fellow of the American Institute of Architects in 1985.

== Selected works ==
- Cates House, Amagansett, NY, 1968
- Chalif House, East Hampton, NY, 1964
- Sabel House, Bridgehampton, NY 1970
- Simon House, Remensberg, 1972
- Tivoli Towers housing complex, Brooklyn, NY 1973
- Formby House, 1980
- Foundation Center, New York, NY, 1985
- Nontraditional Employment for Women, New York, NY, 1994

== Bibliography ==
- GA Houses 13, 1983, ADA Edita Tokyo ISBN 978-4-87140-313-9
