= Barbara de Lamere =

American writer and activist (born 1940)

Barbara de Lamere (born August 1940 in Plainville, Connecticut), also known as Bunny Eisenhower, Careufel de Lamière and Robin Lamiere is an American editor, writer and LGBTQ rights activist, known for co-founding the Queens Liberation Front with Lee Brewster.

== Life ==
de Lamere was born to Irish immigrant Mary Kate Jennings Dame and French-Canadian factory worker Sylvester Edmond Dame. She claimed it was a rural "limited education" alcoholic family, that moved to Washington Heights in her childhood. Assigned male at birth, she recalled she started cross-dressing at the age of three, with her family pretending it didn't happen.

Graduating high school, she volunteered for the United States Air Force in 1959, completing the service in 1963. While in service she entered into a homosexual relationship with a fellow soldier referred to as "Larry", and they lived together until 1967, when Larry married a woman. The same year de Lamere started cross-dressing in public, joined Ridiculous Theatrical Company under the pseudonym Bunny Eisenhower, and met her future wife, anti-Vietnam War activist Enid Jacobs. In 1969, the two participated in the demonstration on the second day of Stonewall riots. The couple married in 1970 in a Unitarian church, with Enid taking the last name Dame. Barbara provided photos and collages for the first two poetry books of Enid, under the pseudonym Robin Lamiere. Around the time she, as Bunny Eisenhower, co-founded the Queens Liberation Front, and the photos of her protesting were published in Lee Brewster's Drag magazine. She studied at City College of New York, obtaining Bachelor of Arts in 1970, and Master of Arts in 1976, starting a job as a proofreader in a law firm.

Following a divorce with Enid in 1978, de Lamere started hormonal transition, came out at work and started saving money for a genital reassignment surgery (which she underwent in 1982). She, as Careufel de Lamière, was Fiction Editor of Home Planet News (a literary tabloid led by Enid and her husband David Lev) since its inception in 1979. In 1990, she joined Gay, Lesbian and Bisexual Veterans of America, becoming a member of the board and editor of the association’s newsletter. In 1993, she was arrested by the police for participating in the unofficial St. Patrick’s Day parade organized by ILGO (Irish Lesbian and Gay Organization). Following Enid's death in 2003, she became co-Executive Editor of Home Planet News.
