= A Question of Love =

1978 television drama film directed by Jerry Thorpe

- Based on: A very real story
- Written by: William Blinn
- Directed by: Jerry Thorpe
- Starring: Gena Rowlands; Jane Alexander; Ned Beatty; Clu Gulager; Bonnie Bedelia; Jocelyn Brando; Josh Albee
- Music by: Billy Goldenberg
- Country of origin: United States
- Original language: English

Production
- Producers: Michael A. Hoey; William Blinn; Jerry Thorpe
- Cinematography: Chuck Arnold
- Editor: Byron Chudnow
- Running time: 98 minutes

Original release
- Network: ABC
- Release: November 26, 1978

A Question of Love is a 1978 American made-for-television drama film directed by Jerry Thorpe and written by William Blinn. The movie is based on a true legal case in which a lesbian mother fought for custody of her children against her ex-husband who claimed her lifestyle was immoral.

The film stars Gena Rowlands and Jane Alexander as the lesbian couple, Clu Gulager as the ex-husband, with Ned Beatty and Bonnie Bedelia as the custody lawyers. It premiered on November 26, 1978, on ABC, and was nominated for a Golden Globe Award for Best Television Film.

== Plot ==
Linda Ray Guettner, a divorcée and nurse, is raising her sons without any help from their father, Mike Guettner. When she moves in with her lover, Barbara Moreland and her daughter, Linda's oldest son gets suspicious of the nature of their relationship. When he questions his mother about it, she tells him she is a lesbian. After visiting his dad one weekend, he decides to live with him instead, and tells his father about his mother's relationship. Mike goes to court and files for full custody of both boys. His position is that her lifestyle is not in the boys' best interests. Even with all the bad deeds exposed about Linda's ex-husband, the ensuing legal battle boiled down to whether an environment with two homosexual parents is healthy for children.

== Cast ==
- Gena Rowlands as Linda Ray Guettner
- Jane Alexander as Barbara Moreland
- Clu Gulager as Mike Guettner
- Keith Mitchell as Billy Guettner
- Josh Albee as David Guettner
- Nancy McKeon as Susan Moreland
- Ned Beatty as Dwayne Stabler
- Bonnie Bedelia as Joan Saltzman
- S. John Launer as The Judge
- Jocelyn Brando as Mrs. Hunnicutt

== Production notes ==
The movie evolved, in part, from a meeting that National Gay Task Force leaders had with ABC executives in March 1977. Ginny Vida, media director of the task force, requested the meeting after a recent TV episode that aired on ABC had portrayed a lesbian in a negative light. Vida told Richard Gitter of the network's Standards and Practices department she wanted positive lesbian portrayals and wanted them "immediately". During the meeting she told them about Mary Jo Risher and Ann Forman, a lesbian couple in Texas, who had gone to court in a custody battle with Risher's ex-husband over their young son.

By 1978, Risher had published her autobiography, By Her Own Admission: A Lesbian Mother’s Fight to Keep Her Son, and there was speculation about a TV movie being made based on her case. William Blinn wrote A Purely Legal Matter (working title), based on her case. The court scenes in the movie were excerpted from the original transcripts, the names were changed, and a family's happy home life was depicted. The project attracted many notable actors for the cast. ABC asked for dozens of script cuts, most of which were later retracted. ABC censors would not let Jane Alexander kiss Gena Rowlands' hand, instead Rowland was allowed to hold Alexander's hand to her cheek.

== Critical reception ==
John J. O'Connor's review in The New York Times was positive, he said the movie "is a serious exploration of a complex issue ... it also avoids cheap sensationalizing..is provocative and, finally, very moving." He praised Rowlands' performance as "marvelously strong and vulnerable ... determined, miserable and elated", and was equally pleased with Alexander's acting, calling it "direct and unaffected, almost searingly on target." The Roanoke Times wrote in 1996, "lesbians were a rare topic for TV drama in 1978", and the movie was considered a bold film. "But it stopped short of siding with the lesbian mom, even though the film clearly wanted us to see that she was a good mother, living in a caring relationship with her lover that in all other ways resembled a conventional marriage."

The Lesbian Tide said in comparison with the book, the "TV drama lacked impact". The magazine criticized Rowlands' performance, stating bluntly that it "was the biggest disappointment ... badly miscast as the heroine ... lacked conviction and was an embarrassment ... her discomfort with the role was glaring". However, they praised Alexander in her role, saying she "did an outstanding job given the number of inadequacies surrounding her ... seemed at home in the role which was reflected in a superior performance". They also noted that the movie would have been better had Rowlands and Alexander reversed roles. Sheila O'Malley from RogerEbert.com wrote in 2015 that the film was "incredibly bold for 1978, and it's an 'issue film' told with a lot of heart and humanity".

Michael Kernan of the Washington Post offered his opinion, saying "A Question of Love examines our attitudes toward homosexuality and finds them wanting. 'Why do they call it gay?' Rowlands murmurs. We begin to ask ourselves what right we have to demand that others live and think and behave and believe as we do. We are reminded that tyranny – even the tyranny of the majority – is caused by fear." In 1979, it was nominated for a Golden Globe Award for Best Television Film.

== Legacy ==
40 years ago when we did the movie, gay people had to fight very hard to prove they were going to be nurturing and responsible parents, and it continues to this day.

— Jane Alexander, Visible: Out on Television

In February 2020, the movie was featured in Visible: Out on Television, a documentary miniseries about the representation of LGBT people in television. Jane Alexander, Ginny Vida and Wanda Sykes, who was a producer of the documentary, offered commentary. Alexander recalled that ABC had told her and Rowlands they were only allowed three touches and absolutely no kissing. So she asked Rowlands what is the best kind of touching you can have, and Rowlands replied; "I'm going to brush your hair in a way it's never been brushed before". Alexander said that scene turned out to be "very sensual".

Forty-three years after pitching the project to ABC, Ginny Vida said that "even though it was a sad ending, millions of people saw this on TV, and audiences felt like this woman was a real victim of prejudice". However, it did give lesbians visibility in an unprecedented way, she said. Sykes said it was a "huge deal" for Rowlands and Alexander to play these parts, and for these actresses to take on these roles "to tell our stories was pretty risky and big on their part, and what that story did was humanize these lesbians as real people".

== See also ==
- Accidental Activists – 2016 American documentary film directed by Mandi Wright
- Lesbophobia
- LGBT parenting
- List of made-for-television films with LGBT characters
- Societal attitudes toward homosexuality
