= Metropolitan Community Church of New York =

Church in Manhattan, New York

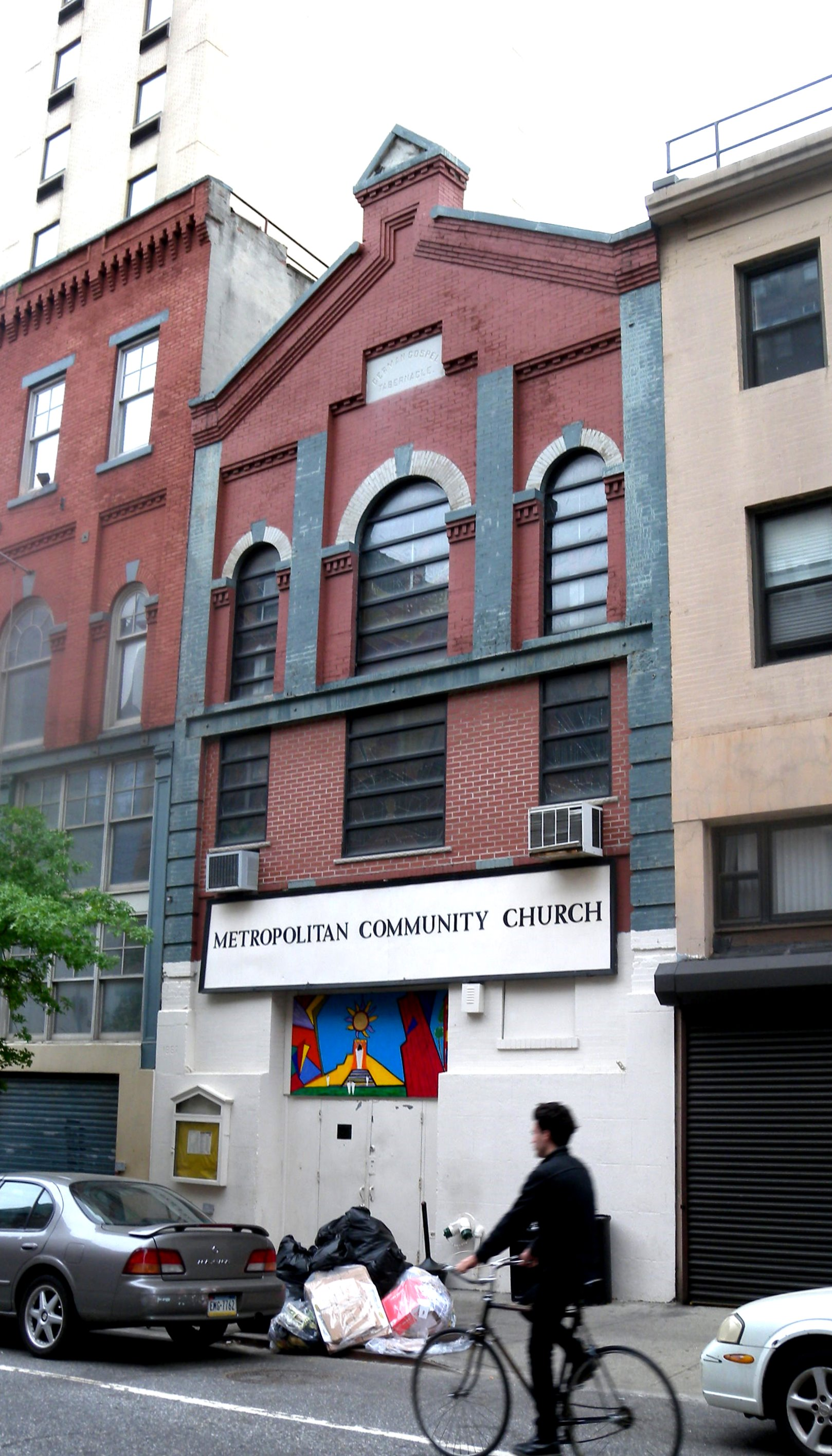
- Metropolitan Community Church of New York
- 40°45′19.6″N 73°59′50.9″W
- Location: New York City
- Country: US
- Denomination: Metropolitan Community Church
- Website: www.mccny.org

History
- Founded: 1972

Clergy
- Pastor: Rev. Pat Bumgardner

The Metropolitan Community Church of New York (MCCNY) is an LGBTQ (lesbian, gay, bisexual, and transgender) Christian church in New York City, located at 446 36th Street between Ninth and Tenth Avenue in the Hell's Kitchen neighborhood on the West Side of Midtown Manhattan.

== Mission ==
While catering mainly to the LGBT population, the church is open to persons of all sexual orientations. MCCNY is affiliated with the Metropolitan Community Church (MCC), a worldwide fellowship of churches catering to LGBT persons and affirming LGBT-supportive theology.

The senior pastor is Pat Bumgardner, a minister and social justice activist. She lives in the West Village. Edgard Danielsen-Morales served as the assistant pastor for congregational Life.

A newsletter titled The Query is published by the church.

== History ==
The church itself was first established in Los Angeles in 1968 by Reverend Troy Perry. Its location changed four years later to New York, inside the Lesbian and Gay Services Center (now the Lesbian, Gay, Bisexual & Transgender Community Center), the address where it remained from 1983 to 1994. The church moved once again in 1994 to its current location at West 36th Street.

== MCCNY charities ==
Sylvia Rivera Food Pantry: MCCNY Charities operates three weekly food pantry services. Tuesday to Friday hot meals/PWA food pantry and the Thursday morning client-choice groceries.

Sylvia's Place: MCCNY Homeless Youth Services is committed to turning the short time (up to 90 days) that youth spend as residents into a time of growth, safety and opportunity. MCCNY Homeless Youth Services provides:

- Drop in services provided six days a week 5–9 Mon–Sat
- Emergency overnight services
- Connections to long-term housing
- Case management
- Advocacy groups
- Showers
- Hot meals
- Reverend Pat Finishing School.
- Q Clinic: Columbia Medical Student Run Clinic for LGBTQ+ Individuals.

Current and former funders of MCCNY Charities have included Ran Murphy Productions, Broadway Cares/Equity Fights AIDS, and The Citizens Committee for New York City.

In 2005, The New York City Council under the leadership of Council Speaker Christine C. Quinn and Chair of the Youth Committee Lewis Fidler allocated $400,000 to fund expenses relating to operating Silvia's Place and temporarily housing homeless youth before transitioning them into housing.

The New York Times wrote an article in 2011 questioning the safety of shelter overnight residents at Silvia's Place (at the first floor of the building owned by MCCNY). Since Silvia's Place is only a temporary housing location for homeless youth, the organization is not licensed as other homeless shelters in New York.

== Notable parishioners ==
- Sylvia Rivera

== See also ==
- LGBT culture in New York City
- LGBT-affirming religious groups
