= Lee Brewster =

American drag queen, transgender activist, and retailer

Lee Greer Brewster
- Brewster in drag
- Born: April 27, 1943; Honaker, Virginia, U.S.
- Died: May 19, 2000 (aged 57); New York City, U.S.
- Known for: Drag queen and New York City boutique
- Movement: LGBT rights

Lee Greer Brewster (April 27, 1943 – May 19, 2000) was an American drag queen, transgender activist, and retailer. He was a founding member of the pre-Stonewall activist group, Queens Liberation Front. In the 1970s and 1980s, he published Drag magazine. Brewster helped to raise funds for the very first U.S. celebration of Pride, Christopher Street Liberation Day in 1970. He continued to help raise funds and organize Christopher Street Liberation Day for several years. Lee Brewster was active in the homophile and gay liberation movements, working with the Mattachine Society of New York as well as the Street Transvestite Action Revolutionaries.

== Personal life ==
Lee Brewster was born in a log cabin in Honaker, Virginia, on April 27, 1943. He was primarily raised in West Virginia, where his father was a coal miner.

He moved to New York City in the 1960s after being fired from the Federal Bureau of Investigation for being a homosexual.

Brewster died of cancer on May 19, 2000, in New York City. He was survived by a sister and three brothers.

West Virginia University has created an online exhibit dedicated to him, and his work.

== Professional life ==
Brewster worked for the Federal Bureau of Investigation as a file clerk in the early 1960s, until he was fired for being a homosexual.

In the 1970s and 1980s, he published Drag magazine.

=== Lee's Mardi Gras Boutique ===
Brewster owned Lee's Mardi Gras Boutique (now Michael Salem Boutique), a 5,000 square feet (460 m^{2}) clothing store in a loft on West 14th Street in New York City's Greenwich Village. The store catered heavily to drag performers. He announced its opening on October 31, 1969, at a ball he was hosting. He described it as the first one devoted to cross-dressers. Initially, the business was mail order based, but after so many people began coming directly to his apartment, he opened a store around the corner from his Hell's Kitchen apartment. It included a bookstore with a comprehensive collection of books on topics related to transvestites. After some years, the store was relocated to a larger space on West 14th Street.

His boutique made efforts to provide privacy to its customers, including never having a street-level entry. However, some customers have been public about utilizing the store. Among its public and notable customers were Lady Bunny, and costume designers for The Birdcage, To Wong Foo, Thanks for Everything! Julie Newmar, and Tootsie. Brewster described his clientele in an interview in The Village Voice saying, "Half of my clients are respectable-looking businessmen," and that they were "very normal, but they know better than to present that side of themselves."

== Drag performances ==
Brewster staged numerous balls and often performed as a drag queen. Following the tradition of old-time drag performers, Brewster preferred to be called by male pronouns, rather than female pronouns, as has become more popular in modern times.

== Activism ==
Brewster advocated for people who wanted to engage in cross-dressing, notably at times when this was an unpopular position in the LGBT movement in the United States.

He became active in the Mattachine Society after moving to New York City in the 1960s, and was even nominated for the position of Secretary of the organization. He coordinated the organization's drag balls and fundraising events. Some members of the organizations disliked public cross-dressing, so he began holding the balls at the Diplomat Hotel on West 43rd Street. The balls, held from 1969 to 1973, became notable enough that the final one was attended by Carol Channing, Shirley MacLaine and Jacqueline Susann.

In the 1970s, Brewster financed a successful legal challenge to a New York City ordinance that allowed people to be removed from public places because they were homosexuals. Though seldom enforced, he felt the regulation gave law enforcement an opportunity to harass LGBT people.

=== Queens Liberation Front ===
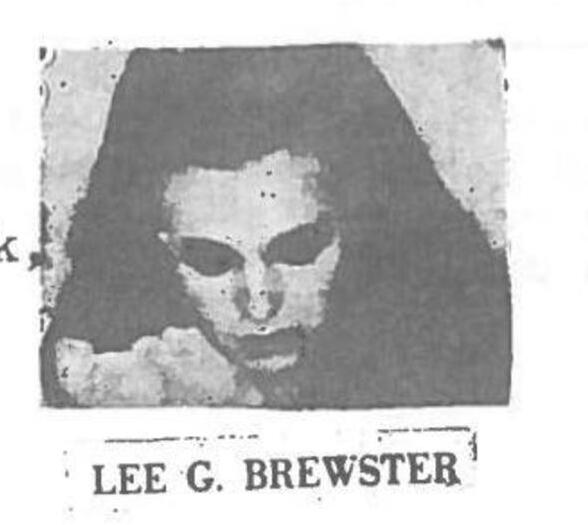
Lee Greer Brewster - Queens Liberation Front - Moonshadow 1973, 09 (page 8 crop)

At his first ball in February 1969, he announced plans to form what would become known as the Queens Liberation Front, with October 31, 1969, to be its formal founding date.

In 1971, the Queens Liberation Front was teamed with the Street Tranvestite Action Revolutionaries, and the Gay Activists Alliance in support of Intro 475, to end discrimination based upon sexual orientation in New York City. Eventually these efforts were successful, and the early involvement of transgender organizations helped to guarantee that transgender rights were respected in resulting gay rights legislation.

Lesbian Feminist Liberation opposed the performance by drag queens at the 1973 LGBT Pride March in New York City. As they passed out flyers, Sylvia Rivera, of Street Transvestite Action Revolutionaries, took the microphone from emcee Vito Russo and spoke against the sentiment and spoke of the harassment and arrests of drag queens on the street, some of whom had been involved with the Stonewall riots. Lesbian Feminist Liberation's Jean O'Leary then insisted on responding by denouncing drag as misogynist and criticizing the march for being too male-dominated. This prompted Brewster to denounce anti-transgender lesbian feminists. The increasingly angry crowd only calmed when Bette Midler, who heard on the radio in her Greenwich Village apartment, arrived, took the microphone, and began singing "Friends". This was one of many events in early 1970s where lesbian and transgender activists clashed.

=== Collaboration with Street Transvestite Action Revolutionaries (S.T.A.R.) ===
==== March on Albany ====
The Queens Liberation Front, including founders Lee Brewster and Bunny Eisenhower, joined with S.T.A.R. including Sylvia Rivera to lead a protest for the repeal of crossdressing laws in New York. They marched to the Capital in Albany, "...in support of the bills currently before the legislators in behalf of liberalized laws on homosexuality. Amongst them are bill for the repeal of impersonation laws...". The groups and their supporters travelled to Albany on four buses that had been chartered by the NY Gay Activists Alliance. Other notable protest attendees included Reverend Troy Perry. Drag Magazine includes two full pages of photographs from the protest, including Lee Brewster and Sylvia Rivera together holding their protest signs.

==== Panel Discussion with Sylvia Rivera and Marsha P. Johnson ====
In 1972, Lee Brewster was part of a panel discussion on "transvestism" with S.T.A.R. representatives Sylvia Rivera, Marsha P. Johnson, and Bebe Scarpi.

== See also ==
- History of the transgender community in the United States
- LGBT culture in New York City
- LGBT movements in the United States
- List of LGBT people from New York City
- NYC Pride March
- Queens Liberation Front
