= Media Network (New York) =

American organization

- Media Network
- Purpose: Media Network helps people who are working for social change find and use films, videotapes and slideshows to further their goals.

Media Network was an American organization from New York. Established in the 1980s, the organization aimed to generate social change by providing information on films, videotapes and slideshows for educators and activists.

== Works ==
One of their most notable works is the Guide to Films on Reproductive Rights (1983), a book they produced with the Reproductive Rights National Network and The Film Fund. In light of new organizations and movements that advocated for the legalization of abortion, the Media Network and the Reproductive Rights National Network were increasingly asked to recommend “a good organizing film.” The two organizations then combined their resources, along with financial support from The Film Fund, and created a comprehensive guide to films, videotapes and slideshows that concerned reproductive rights movements. It included content on abortion, sterilization, contraception, childcare, gay and lesbian rights, teenage sexuality, reproductive hazards and more. The guide also provides considerable advice on how to organize good film screenings, distribute printed information about the films, and generate discussions after the films. Ultimately, their goal was to create a valuable resource for educators and organizers and to encourage media use. They sought films that would clearly explain the issues and encourage audiences to discuss and perhaps start activist work.

== Location ==
Media Network was located in 208 West 13th Street, New York, along with other organizations such as Partnership for The Homeless, Community Health Project, Friends of the Earth, S.A.G.E., and Metropolitan Community Church. The building is now known as The Lesbian, Gay, Bisexual & Transgender Community Center, or more commonly known as The center.
