= Queens Liberation Front =

Transvestite rights advocacy group

- Queens Liberation Front members (center: Lee Brewster) marching in New York City in 1973. Source: Transgender Archive
- Founded: October 31, 1969
- Location: New York City, New York
- Key people: Lee Brewster and Bunny Eisenhower
- Formerly called: Queens

Queens Liberation Front (QLF) was a homophile group primarily focused of transvestite and drag queens rights advocacy organization in New York City. QLF was formed in 1969 and active in the 1970s. They published Drag Queens: A Magazine About the Transvestite beginning in 1971. The Queens Liberation Front collaborated with a number of other LGBTQ activist groups, including the Gay Activists Alliance and the Street Transvestite Action Revolutionaries.

== Formation ==
Queens Liberation Front was founded as Queens by Lee Brewster in 1969. At his first ball in February 1969, Brewster announced plans to form the group, with October 31, 1969 (Halloween, a particularly popular holiday in the drag community) to be its formal founding date.

The organization was founded in part to oppose the relegation of drag queens to the back of the March at the first Christopher Street Liberation Day in June 1970. In protest, the street queens from STAR moved to the front and marched at the front of the parade anyway.

== Activities ==
Queens Liberation Front participated in many activities to advocate for the rights of LGBT people, particularly transvestites. The organization also participated in LGBT events such as the LGBT Pride March. Members sometimes wore drag while lobbying New York state legislators.

The organization often collaborated with other local LGBT organizations, such as Gay Activists Alliance and Street Transvestite Action Revolutionaries.

In the early 1970s, the organizations successfully used litigation to overturn a New York City ordinance against cross-dressing.

In 1973, Queens Liberation Front agreed to a compromise amendment to New York City's anti-discrimination ordinance that added sexual orientation to the ordinance, but clarified the ordinance did not cover cross-dressing. The organization's director, Bebe Scarpie, met with the bill's sponsor at City Hall and agreed to the compromise. The organization's lawyer, Richard Levidow, believed the exclusionary clause violated the United States Constitution and was therefore unenforceable.

Lesbian Feminist Liberation opposed the performance by drag queens at the 1973 NYC Pride March in New York City. As they passed out flyers, Sylvia Rivera, of Street Transvestite Action Revolutionaries, took the microphone from emcee Vito Russo and spoke against this sentiment, delivering a speech about spending time in jail, and being harassed and beaten by the straight men who were preying on all the members of the gay community. Rivera ended by leading a chant for "Gay Power!" Lesbian Feminist Liberation's Jean O'Leary then read a statement on behalf of 100 women that read, in part, "We support the right of every person to dress in the way that she or he wishes. But we are opposed to the exploitation of women by men for entertainment or profit." Queens Liberation Front's Lee Brewster replied in support of drag and the drag queens in the community. Brewster was loudly cursed when he called the lesbians speaking a slur for women - "b***hes." The increasingly angry crowd only calmed when Bette Midler, who heard on the radio in her Greenwich Village apartment, arrived, took the microphone, and began singing "Friends". This was one of several events in early 1970s where lesbian feminists, gay men, and drag queens at times found themselves in conflict; while other events, such as those led by the GLF women's caucus, often had harmonious participation between these sometimes contentious factions.

== See also ==
- Gay Activists Alliance
- History of lesbianism in the United States
- LGBT culture in New York City
- List of LGBT people from New York City
- NYC Pride March
- Street Transvestite Action Revolutionaries
