= Josh Albee =

American television actor

- Born: Joshua Albee; September 19, 1959 (age 66); Augsburg, Germany
- Education: Hollywood High School; California State University, Northridge (BA)
- Occupation: Former child actor
- Years active: 1962–1981
- Known for: Caleb in Jeremiah Johnson
- Relatives: Roxanne Albee (sister)

Josh Albee (born September 19, 1959) is an American former child actor, best known for his role as the young, mute boy Caleb in the film Jeremiah Johnson.

Albee remained active in acting through the early 1980s. His later work was mostly as a television actor.

== Filmography ==
- Sealab 2020 (1972) (TV series)
- Gunsmoke (2 episodes, 1971–1972) (TV)
- Jeremiah Johnson (1972)
- Lassie (3 episodes, 1972)
- Adventures of Tom Sawyer (1973) (TV)
- The Addams Family (1973) (TV series)
- Emergency! (2 episodes, 1972–1973)
- Yogi's Gang (3 episodes, 1973) (TV)
- The ABC Afternoon Playbreak (1 episode, 1974) (TV)
- Oliver Twist (1974) (voice)
- Earthquake (1974)
- The Runaways (1975) (TV)
- The Family Holvak (1 episode, 1975) (TV)
- The Secret of Isis (1 episode, 1975) (TV)
- Helter Skelter (1976) (TV)
- The Quest (1 episode, 1976) (TV)
- A Question of Love (1978) (TV)
- Project UFO (1 episode, 1978) (TV)
- The Young and the Restless (1979–1980)
- Code Red (1981) (TV)
