= The Runaways (1975 film) =

- 1986 VHS cover
- Genre: Adventure; Family; Drama
- Based on: The Runaways by Victor Canning
- Written by: John McGreevey
- Directed by: Harry Harris
- Starring: Dorothy McGuire; Van Williams; Josh Albee
- Music by: Earle Hagen
- Country of origin: United States
- Original language: English

Production
- Executive producer: Lee Rich
- Producer: Philip Capice
- Production locations: The Burbank Studios, Burbank, California
- Cinematography: Russell Metty
- Editor: Marjorie Fowler
- Running time: 76 minutes
- Production company: Lorimar Productions

Original release
- Network: CBS
- Release: April 1, 1975

The Runaways is a 1975 American made-for-television drama film directed by Harry Harris. Starring Dorothy McGuire, Van Williams, and Josh Albee, it follows a teenage boy and an escaped leopard. It first aired on the CBS network on April 1, 1975.

It was the most viewed primetime program in the United States for the week when it debuted in April 1975.

The movie was adapted from a 1972 novel of the same name by British author Victor Canning. It was adapted for television by John McGreevey, one of the writers for The Waltons.

The film was originally intended to be two hours in length, but was trimmed down to 90 minutes, which created some gaps in the storytelling. The leopard used in the film was named Spot, and a jaguar named Clyde used for the running scenes.

The film was released on VHS in 1986.
