= Disparity =

Disparity and disparities may refer to:

in healthcare:

- Health disparities

in finance:

- Income disparity between females and males.
  - Male–female income disparity in the United States
  - Income gender gap
- Economic inequality
- Income inequality metrics
- International inequality
  - Income inequality in the United States
  - Wealth inequality in the United States

in science:

- Stereopsis, the perception of depth and structure derived from binocular vision
- Binocular disparity, binocular cue to determine depth or distance of an object
- Ecological disparity, the number of different guilds occupying an ecosystem
- Phenotypic disparity, variation of observable characteristics within biological groups
- Running disparity, the number of 1 bits minus the number of 0 bits
  - Paired disparity code, a pattern that keeps the running disparity close to zero

in social science:

- Social inequality
- Social equality
- Social stratification
- Curvilinear Disparity is a political theory which posits that the rank and file members of a party tend to be more ideological than both the leadership of that party and its voters.
