= Lesbian, Gay, Bisexual & Transgender Community Center =

LGBT community organization in New York City

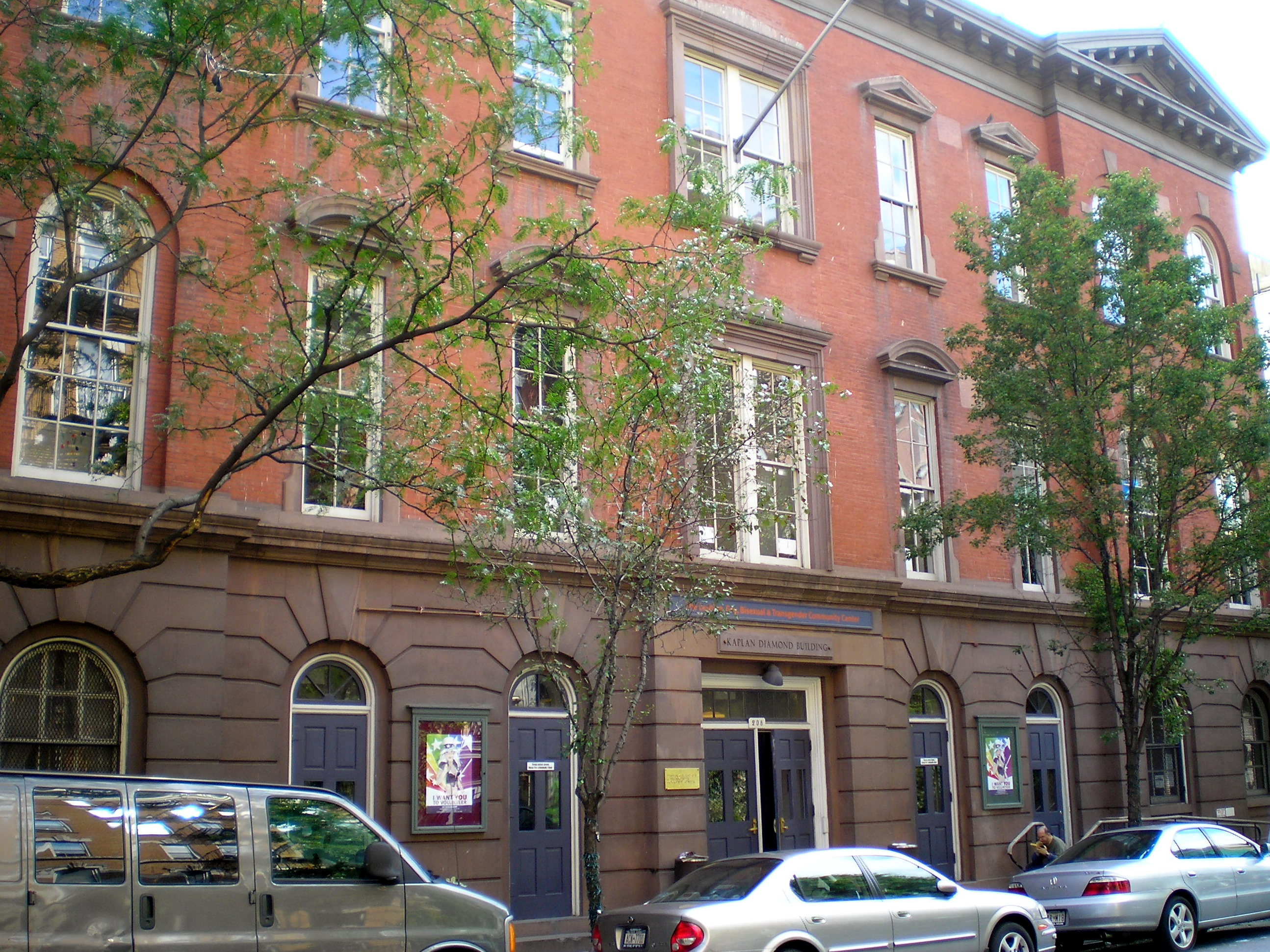
- The Center's facade on West 13th Street
- Founded: December 1, 1983
- Purpose: Health and Wellness Programs; Community Center; Celebrates LGBT cultural contributions; Center for organizing
- Location: West Village, Lower Manhattan, New York City
- Coordinates: 40.738255°N 74.001123°W
- Website: gaycenter.org

The Lesbian, Gay, Bisexual & Transgender Community Center (formerly Lesbian and Gay Community Services Center), commonly called The Center, is a nonprofit organization serving the lesbian, gay, bisexual and transgender (LGBTQ) population of New York City and nearby communities.

The Center is located in the West Village at 208 West 13th Street in Lower Manhattan, in a historic building which formerly housed an elementary school and the High School for Food Trades. The Center is a member of the Equality Federation.

== History ==
In December 1983, the New York City Board of Estimates approved the sale of the former Food and Maritime Trades High School, located at 208 West 13th Street, to the Lesbian & Gay Community Services Center, Inc. for $1.5 million. According to the Greenwich Village Society for Historical Preservation, the first tenants of the Center were Partnership for The Homeless, Community Health Project, Friends of the Earth, S.A.G.E., Metropolitan Community Church and the Media Network. In its first year, 60 groups met regularly at the center. By 2007, more than 300 groups called the center home.

In 1985, the center became the temporary home to the Harvey Milk High School, a program of the Hetrick-Martin Institute. The Lesbian Switchboard became a permanent tenant after leaving the Women's Liberation Center, and Dignity, a Catholic gay and lesbian religious organization, sought refuge when it was expelled from Catholic churches.

In 1989, the center commissioned The Center Show, an art exhibit to commemorate the 20th anniversary of the Stonewall riots. Some of the pieces in the exhibit included: Adam and Eve by George Martin, Boy on a Wall by Stephen Lack, and Once Upon a Time by Keith Haring.

The availability of meeting space was a major organizing tool for the LGBT movement in the 1980s and early 1990s. Groups that have expanded throughout the nation, such as the AIDS Coalition to Unleash Power (ACT UP), Queer Nation, Lesbian Avengers, and Gay & Lesbian Alliance Against Defamation (GLAAD), had their inception at the center. At one point in the early 1990s, the center was hosting regular meetings for more than three hundred groups.

The LGBT Community Center in 2018

In 2015, the center completed a $9.2 million renovation, which included numerous improvements to the space, acoustics, and lighting. Art from the 1989 The Center Show is prominently showcased throughout the newly renovated space.

== Facilities and activities ==
Every week, 6,000 people visit the center, and more than 300 groups meet in the building. These groups range from political activist organizations to social clubs. The center also frequently hosts speeches, performances, workshops, and commercially sponsored information sessions.

Programs produced by the center include Center Wellness, an Adult Services Department working with people with AIDS, struggling with substance abuse issues, mental health challenges and much more; Youth Services, an activities-based program for LGBT youth; Center Cultural Programs, presenting established and emerging artists, writers, and activists to the community; Center Families, the center's family project.

Bureau of General Services—Queer Division is a bookstore and event space located on the second floor of the center.

Mayor Zohran Mamdani and Dutch Prime Minister Rob Jetten visit the library.

=== The Pat Parker/Vito Russo Center Library ===
The Center Library is a lending library started in 1991. It was closed to the public from March 2020 to October 2024 before reopening under a team of volunteers. The Library shares space with the Center's archives and has sponsored monthly reading groups and been a producer and/or collaborator for literary events of interest to the LGBT+ community. The Library is named in honor of Pat Parker and Vito Russo, individuals who championed LGBT+ causes in their professional and personal lives.

=== LGBT Community Center National History Archive ===
The LGBT Community Center National History Archive is a community-based archive founded in 1990 by Richard Wandel. Particular subject areas include gay liberation and the early HIV/AIDS crisis in New York. The archive was founded in response to the AIDS Crisis, when friends and family would donate archival and personal materials that traditional archives did not typically accept. The Archive has a history of working with the LGBT community of NYC in preserving records of the community's history. In 1995, the archive worked with the Imperial Court of New York for their community newsletter on gay history.

=== Recovery and health ===
The center offers programs which care for the health and needs of the LGBT community. These programs include substance use treatments for adults and youths, recovery support, recovery resources, insurance enrollment, HIV & AIDS support, TGNC (trans and gender non-conforming) support, internships and professional training, and counseling and mental health.

Numerous Alcoholics Anonymous, Narcotics Anonymous, and other twelve-step recovery groups meet at the center. The center's Mental Health and Social Services division also sponsors support groups focused on coming out, transgender rights, bereavement, and other topics of concern to the LGBT community.

=== Family and youth ===
The center provides support for individuals and their families. Some of the services and programming of the center include building families, strengthening families, connecting families, family therapy certification, and family resources.

The center provides a range of events and services for individuals ages 13–21 such as dances, movie screenings, open mic night, summer camp and discussion groups. The programming and services are connection, leadership, support, and youth resources.

The center also houses Center Youth (previously called Y.E.S.), which provides support and resources for LGBTQ and allied youth. Programs such as both a young men's and a young women's discussion group, a gender exploration group, a safe schools network, a yearly summer camp and a variety of support groups are available to youth free of charge.

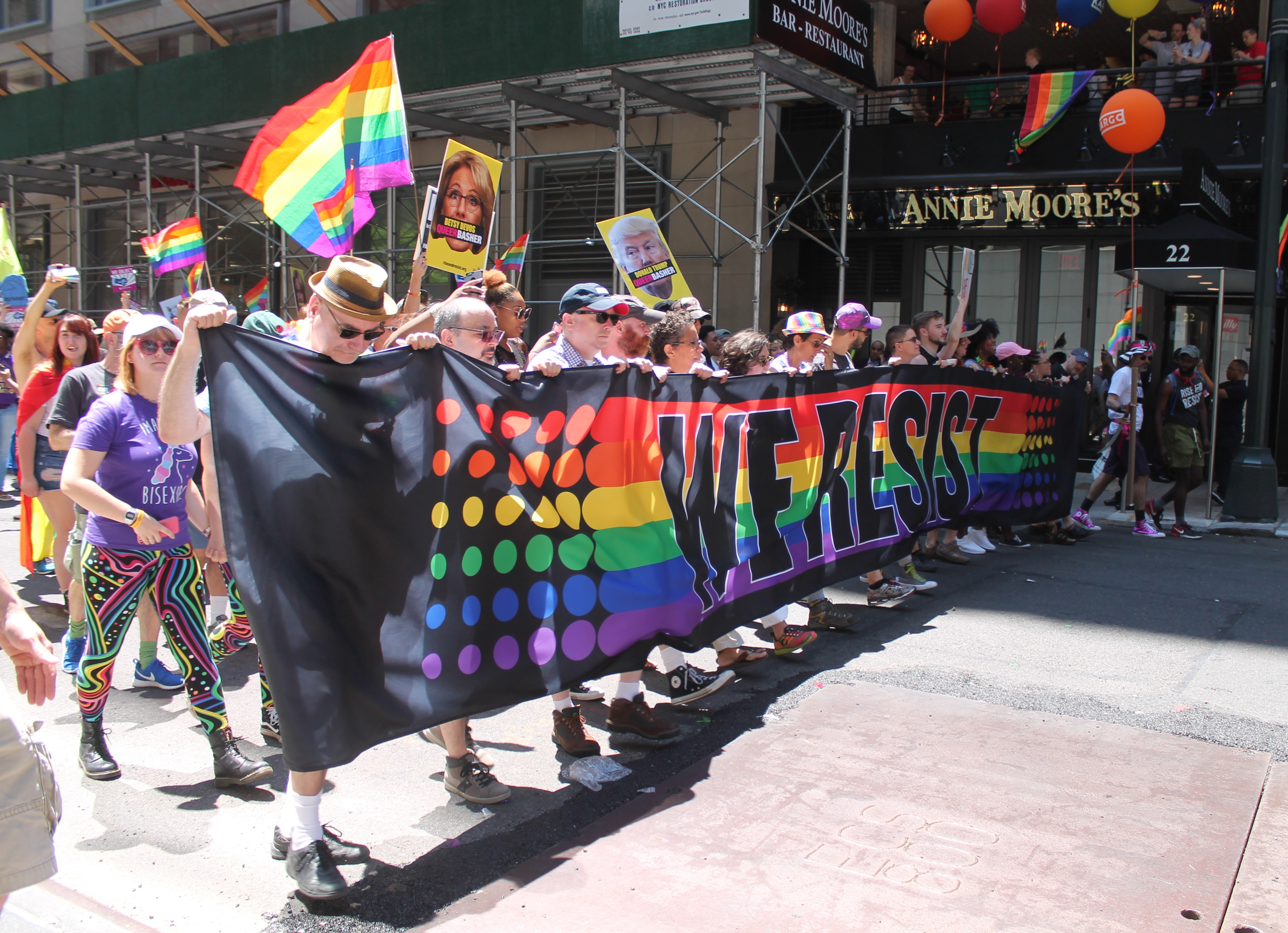

== Israeli Apartheid Week controversy ==
In February 2011, the center became embroiled in a controversy over a pro-Palestinian group that was to have a party in the building on March 5 during "Israeli Apartheid Week". The group, Siegebusters, planned to train activists and raise funds for another vessel to break the Israeli naval blockade of Gaza. Advocate columnist and porn producer Michael Lucas threatened a boycott, claiming that Israel is the only gay-friendly country in the Middle East, that the group was antisemitic, and that LGBT people in the Palestinian territories are tortured and killed. The center cancelled the party, stating that Siegebusters was not an LGBT-related group. Siegebusters protested the decision by organizing an online petition; whereas Lucas hailed the decision in an interview with The Jerusalem Post.

In May 2011, the center announced that it would allow the group Queers Against Israeli Apartheid to meet in their building. The Center defended the move, stating that it "provides space for a variety of LGBT voices in our community to engage in conversations on a range of topics." At the beginning of June 2011, the Center decided to place a "moratorium" on renting space to "groups that organize around the Israeli-Palestinian conflict."

== See also ==
- List of LGBT community centers
- LGBT culture in New York City
