= Lesbian Feminist Liberation =

Lesbian rights advocacy organization

- Founded: 1972
- Location: New York City, New York
- Key people: Jean O'Leary
- Formerly called: Lesbian Liberation Committee

Lesbian Feminist Liberation is a lesbian rights advocacy organization in New York City formed in 1972.

== Formation ==
Lesbian Feminist Liberation was originally the Lesbian Liberation Committee and a part of the Gay Activists Alliance (GAA). In 1972, when the members felt the GAA was not giving enough focus to lesbian and feminist issues, they left GAA and formed the Lesbian Feminist Liberation. The departure was coordinated by Jean O'Leary. The formation of Lesbian Feminist Liberation left the Radicalesbians (RL) group with few members. The Lesbian Liberation Committee, and initially the Lesbian Feminist Liberation as well, met at an old firehouse at 99 Wooster Street in SoHo, the location was known as "The Firehouse." Later they moved to another converted firehouse, the Women's Liberation Center.

== Activities ==
In 1973, Lesbian Feminist Liberation participated in the campaign to lobby the New York City Council to add sexual orientation to the city's anti-discrimination city ordinance.

Twenty-five members of the organization attended The Dick Cavett Show and disrupted his interview with George Gilder, an author the organization believed was anti-feminist and anti-lesbian.

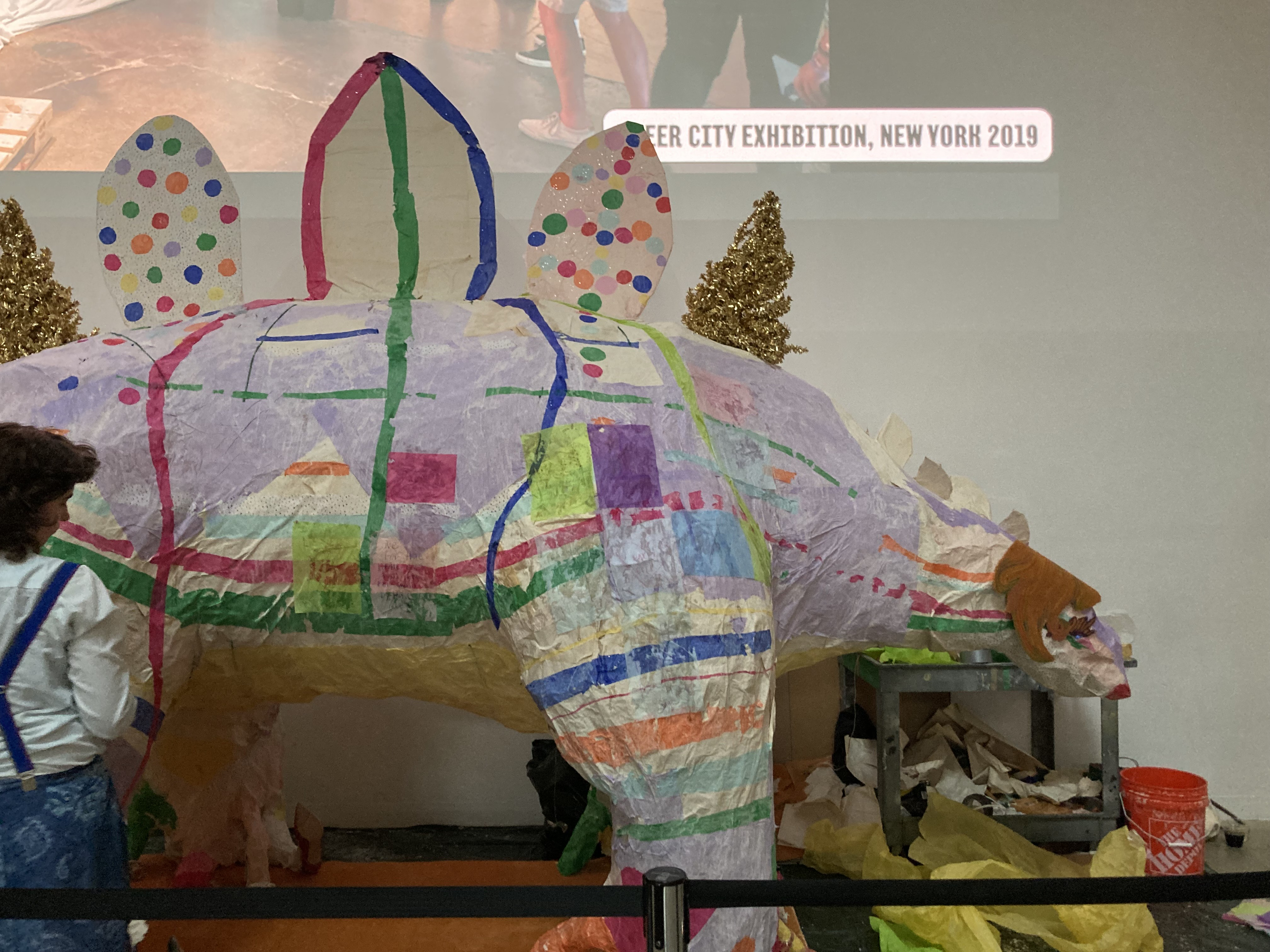
A recreation of Sapphosaura, created by Anna Moustakerski and Teagan Hoey, at the American Museum of Natural History in June 2025.

On August 26, 1973, the organization organized a demonstration with 200 participants, including the Victoria Hull Marching Band, and a large fake lavender colored dinosaur named Sapphasaura outside the National Museum of American History to protest sexism at the museum; the LFL had previously submitted a complaint calling for changes to sexist and homophobic displays, and a transition to more gender-neutral language in the exhibits. The zap was covered by mainstream news such as New York Daily News and lesbian publications like Lesbian Tide and Pointblank Times; much of the coverage occurred due to the presence of the L.O.V.E. (Lesbians Organized for Video Experience) Collective and journalist and activist, Karla Jay.

They picketed at a Lincoln Center for the Performing Arts movie theater that was showing Rainer Werner Fassbinder's The Bitter Tears of Petra von Kant, which some feminists found offensive for its depiction of lesbian sadomasochism.

Lesbian Feminist Liberation's Jean O'Leary speaks at 1973 LGBT Pride March in New York City.

The organization opposed the performance by drag queens at the 1973 LGBT Pride March in New York City. As they passed out flyers, Sylvia Rivera, of Street Transvestite Action Revolutionaries, took the microphone from emcee Vito Russo and spoke against the sentiment and spoke of the harassment and arrests of drag queens on the street, some of whom had been involved with the Stonewall riots. Lesbian Feminist Liberation's Jean O'Leary then insisted on responding by denouncing drag as misogynist and criticizing the march for being too male-dominated. This prompted Lee Brewster of Queens Liberation Front to denounce anti-transgender lesbian feminists. The increasingly angry crowd only calmed when Bette Midler, who heard these events reported on the radio in her Greenwich Village apartment, arrived, took the microphone, and began singing "Friends". This was one of many events in early 1970s where lesbian and transgender activists clashed.

When NBC aired "Flowers of Evil", an episode of Police Woman about a trio of lesbians murdering nursing home residents for their money, the organization staged a zap at NBC's New York City headquarters on November 19, 1973. Ten women entered the building in pairs at 15-minute intervals, traveling by elevator to different floors before converging on the Standards and Practices offices. Advised that vice president Herminio Traviesas would not return to the office until the following week, demonstrators announced their intention to wait until he returned and occupied his office overnight. Around 75 women demonstrated in front of the building. The following morning half of the women left, along with the children of the lead protester. The remaining protesters unfurled a twenty foot long banner from the balcony of vice president Herminio Traviesas's office reading "LESBIANS PROTEST NBC". They and street-level picketers chanted slogans like "NBC works against lesbians" and "Lesbians are sitting in". The demonstrators hoped to attract both network news coverage and arrests. When they realized neither was forthcoming, they left the building. While the networks ignored the story, it was picked up by local media and the wire services. Ultimately, NBC agreed not to rerun the episode.

In 1974, the organization worked with New York Radical Feminists to increase the visibility of women at the New York City LGBT Pride March.

The papers of the LFL are now held at the archives of Hamilton College.

== See also ==
- History of lesbianism in the United States
- LGBT culture in New York City
- Ginny Vida
