= Brian McNaught =

Diversity coach and author

- Born: January 28, 1948 (age 78)
- Occupations: Diversity and sensitivity coach and author

Brian McNaught (born January 28, 1948) is a corporate diversity and sensitivity coach and author who specializes in LGBTQ issues in the workplace.

== Early life and education ==
A conscientious objector to the war in Vietnam, McNaught did his alternative service at The Michigan Catholic, weekly newspaper of the Archdiocese of Detroit, where he worked as a writer and columnist from 1970 to 1974. In 1974, McNaught founded the Detroit chapter of Dignity, the national gay Catholic organization. When he came out in an article on Dignity in The Detroit News, the diocesan newspaper dropped his column. McNaught went on a water fast, which lasted 17 days, ending with a letter of support from Bishop Thomas Gumbleton. Following the fast, McNaught was fired by the newspaper, resulting in a civil rights suit, which was settled out of court.

== Life and career ==
From 1974 to 1986, McNaught wrote a syndicated column in the gay press, entitled, "A Disturbed Peace." Following Anita Bryant's successful campaign to overturn gay rights protections in Dade County, Florida, McNaught wrote the essay, "Dear Anita, Late Night Thoughts of an Irish Catholic Homosexual." Initially published by Impact magazine out of Syracuse University, the essay was widely republished, resulting in McNaught appearing on "To the Point," a Miami talk show on which he debated the head of Anita Bryant Ministry's conversion program.

From 1982 to 1984, McNaught served as the mayor of Boston's Liaison to the Gay Community, the first such full time position in the country. With the permission of Mayor Kevin White, McNaught created the first city task force on AIDS. That task force influenced the screening process instituted by the American Red Cross.

McNaught became a speaker and trainer on lesbian, gay, bisexual, and transgender issues in the workplace, acting as a consultant to companies and discussion moderator.

McNaught has written five books. Several books focus on advice for LGBTQ individuals and employers on dealing with the challenges faced by the LGBTQ community. Recommendations from his book Gay Issues in the Workplace are included in many corporate diversity policies.

In 2011 he won the Selisse Berry Leadership Award.

== Bibliography ==
Pieces written by McNaught
Year	Name
1997	Now That I'm Out, What Do I Do?
1986	On Being Gay: Thoughts On Family, Faith, And Love
2003	Gay Issues In The Workplace
2008	Are You Guys Brothers?
2025	A Prince of A Boy
