= Jean O'Leary =

American lesbian and gay rights activist

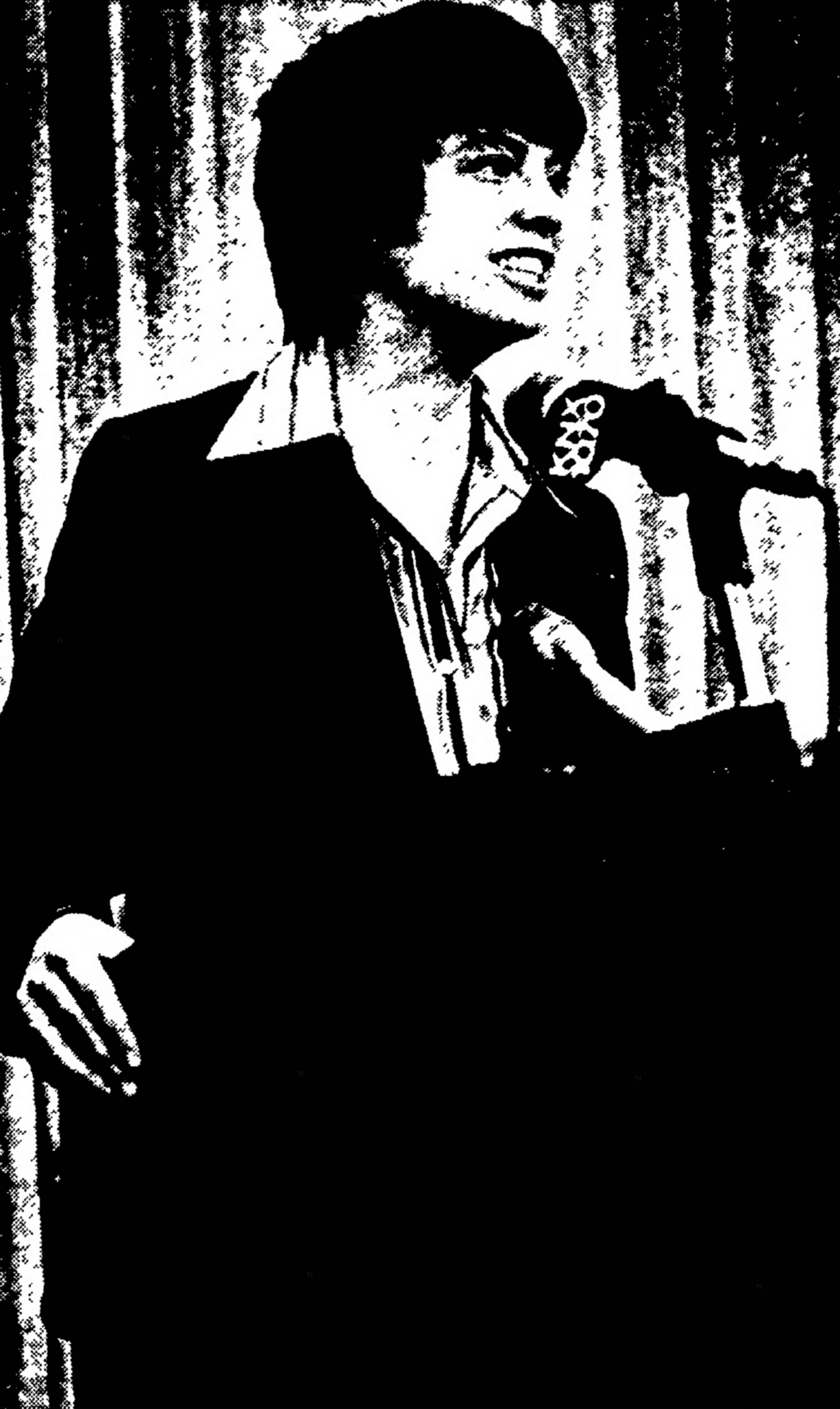
- O'Leary in 1977
- Born: March 4, 1948; Kingston, New York, U.S.
- Died: June 4, 2005 (aged 57); San Clemente, California, U.S.
- Known for: Lesbian feminist and Gay liberation activist; founder of Lesbian Feminist Liberation and co-founder of National Coming Out Day

Jean O'Leary (March 4, 1948 – June 4, 2005) was an American lesbian and gay rights activist. She was the founder of Lesbian Feminist Liberation, one of the first lesbian activist groups in the women's movement, and an early member and co-director of the National Gay and Lesbian Task Force. She co-founded National Coming Out Day.

In 1977 O'Leary organized the first meeting of gay leaders at the White House and then organized the passing of a sexual preference resolution for NOW at Houston's Metropolitan Community Church. Before becoming a lesbian and gay rights activist, she was a Roman Catholic religious sister. She would later write about her experience in a 1985 anthology, Lesbian Nuns: Breaking Silence.

== Early life ==
O'Leary was born in Kingston, New York, and raised in Cleveland, Ohio. In 1966, just out of high school, she entered the novitiate of the Sisters of the Humility of Mary, of Villa Maria, Pennsylvania, in order to "have an impact on the world". In 1971, after graduating from Cleveland State University with a degree in psychology, she left the convent before completing the period of training.

== Activism ==
O'Leary reads a statement at the 1973 Christopher Street Liberation Day in New York City.

In 1971 O'Leary moved to New York City and did doctoral studies in organization development at Yeshiva University. As a lesbian during this period, she became involved with the nascent gay rights movement, joining the Gay Activists' Alliance (GAA) Chapter in Brooklyn and later lobbying state politicians. In 1972, feeling that it was too dominated by the men of the movement, she left the GAA and founded Lesbian Feminist Liberation, one of the first lesbian activist groups in the women's movement. Two years later, she joined the National Gay Task Force, negotiating gender parity in its executive with director Bruce Voeller, joining as co-executive director.

In 1977, O'Leary organized the first meeting of gay rights activists at the White House through arrangements made with White House staffer Midge Costanza, with whom she was in a secret relationship. She was the first openly gay person appointed to a presidential commission, the National Commission on the Observance of International Women's Year, by Jimmy Carter. In this role she negotiated for gay and lesbian rights to be included on the discussion in a conference marking the year in Houston, Texas.

In November 1977, O'Leary was a speaker at the 1977 National Women's Conference. Other speakers included Rosalynn Carter, Betty Ford, Lady Bird Johnson, Bella Abzug, Barbara Jordan, Audrey Colom, Claire Randall, Gerridee Wheeler, Cecilia Burciaga, Gloria Steinem, and Lenore Hershey.

O'Leary was among three openly gay delegates to the United States Democratic Party convention in 1976. She also served on the Democratic National Committee for 12 years, 8 of those on the executive committee.

During the early 1980s, O'Leary focused on building National Gay Rights Advocates, then one of the largest national gay and lesbian rights groups. It was one of the first to respond to the HIV/AIDS epidemic's implications for legal and civil liberties, using aggressive litigation to ensure AIDS patients' access to treatment.

She co-founded National Coming Out Day with Rob Eichberg in 1988.

=== Radical lesbian feminism ===
In a speech given at the 1973 Christopher Street Liberation Day, O'Leary read a statement on behalf of 100 women that read, in part, "We support the right of every person to dress in the way that she or he wishes. But we are opposed to the exploitation of women by men for entertainment or profit." In response, Sylvia Rivera and Lee Brewster, both self-identified drag queens, jumped onstage and responded, "You go to bars because of what drag queens did for you, and these bitches tell us to quit being ourselves!"

In the early 1970s, O'Leary and other gay liberation activists did not actively include all transsexuals and transvestites in proposed gay rights legislation, (Note: At the time, the term "gay" was commonly used to refer to all lesbian and gay people. Those we now refer to as transgender, and gay-identified bisexuals, were also included under this term if they participated socially in the lesbian and gay community. However, the umbrella terms "LGBT", "transgender", and "queer" were not yet in popular usage during these years.) largely due to the belief that this would make basic legislation too difficult to pass at the time. O'Leary later regretted her stance against the drag queens attending in 1973: "Looking back, I find this so embarrassing because my views have changed so much since then. I would never pick on a transvestite now." "It was horrible. How could I work to exclude transvestites and at the same time criticize the feminists who were doing their best back in those days to exclude lesbians?"

O'Leary was referring to the Lavender Menace, a description by second wave feminist Betty Friedan for attempts by members of the National Organization for Women (NOW) to distance themselves from the perception of NOW as a haven for lesbians. As part of this process, Rita Mae Brown and other lesbians who had been active in NOW were forced out. They staged a protest in 1970 at the Second Congress to Unite Women, and earned the support of many NOW members, finally gaining full acceptance in 1971.

== Personal life ==
She and her partner, Lisa Phelps, had a daughter (Victoria) and a son (David de Maria).

O'Leary died on June 4, 2005, in San Clemente, California, of lung cancer, aged 57.

== Legacy ==
[Jean O'Leary] helped the women's movement to recognize the universal cost of homophobia, and the gay movement to see that marginalizing the voices of lesbians would only diminish its power.

— Gloria Steinem, in The New York Times

Season 2, episodes 4 and 5 of the podcast Making Gay History are about her.

O'Leary, and her advocacy for the inclusion of lesbian and gay rights in the 1977 National Women's Conference, is portrayed by Canadian actress Anna Douglas in the FX television miniseries Mrs America.
