= Arms ache avid aeon =

arms ache avid aeon (stylized in lower case) is a project created by artist and curator Jo-ey Tang in collaboration with artists Nancy Brooks Brody, Joy Episalla, Zoe Leonard, and Carrie Yamaoka, four New York City-based founding members of fierce pussy, a feminist and activist art collective founded in 1991 amid its members’ involvement in queer and AIDS activism.

== Exhibitions ==
Through a series of exhibition chapters begun in 2015, the project aims to examine connections between individual and collective practices within political contexts by drawing on each artist’s work starting since the late 1980s. The artists' work across mediums such as photography, video, painting, and sculpture. Beeler Gallery at Columbus College of Art & Design hosted the first four chapters during its five-month inaugural season, followed by a fifth chapter at the Institute of Contemporary Art at the University of Pennsylvania featuring a different selection of artworks.

The group’s exhibition at the 61st Venice Biennale presented Chapter Nine, which brought together works from each artist dating from 1991 to 2026, alongside two bilingual poster works displayed throughout Venice and the conversion of the Giardini’s former Biglietteria Scarpa ticket office into a welcoming space.
