= Alex Dodge =

American artist (born 1977)

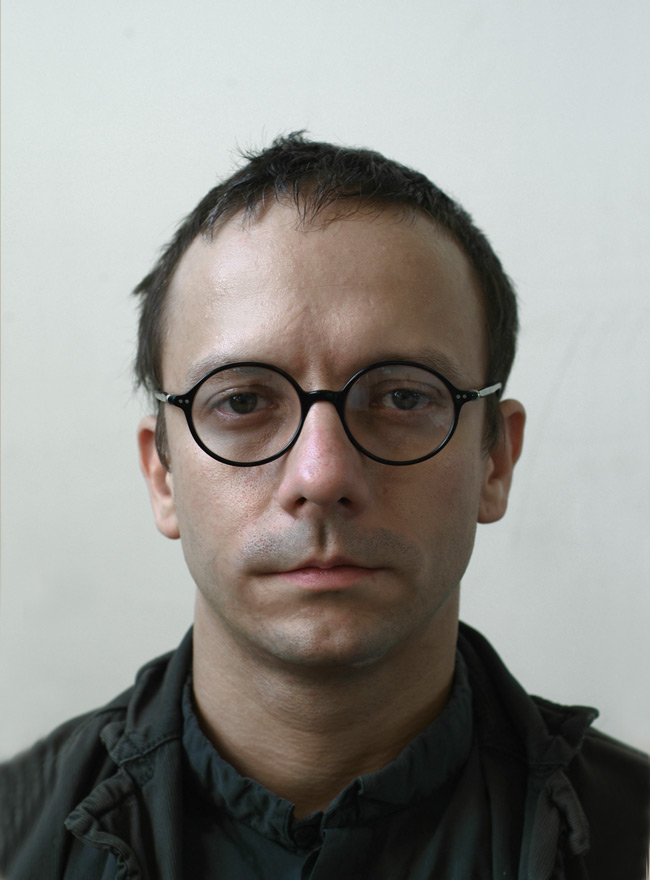
- Dodge in 2012
- Born: November 28, 1977 (age 48); Denver, Colorado, US
- Education: Rhode Island School of Design; Interactive Telecommunications Program, New York University
- Known for: Artist
- Notable work: Everything appears as it is, infinite (2011)

Alex Dodge (born November 28, 1977) is an American artist living and working in Brooklyn, New York. Dodge's work is included in many important public collections, including The Whitney Museum of American Art, NY; The Museum of Modern Art, NY, The New York Public Library, NY, Museum of Fine Arts, Boston, MA, and The Metropolitan Museum of Art, NY. Alex Dodge is represented by Klaus von Nichtssagend Gallery and BB&M in Seoul.

== Early life ==
Born November 28, 1977, in Denver, Dodge was the middle child of three brothers. His older brother Tomory Dodge, also an artist and prolific painter, would later show at CRG Gallery where Dodge served as director for some time. Growing up Dodge had an early fascination with machines and technology of all kinds often disassembling household appliances and eventually building his own computer from parts. Early on, his interests focused on the sciences; first with marine biology, oceanography, and finally particle physics and cosmology. During high school Dodge quickly realized that his math ability was limited and that his ambitions in physics might not be within his grasp. It was during this time that he began to consider visual art seriously.

== Education ==
During high school Dodge was among the first attendees of the Denver School of the Arts, a then newly founded magnet school for the arts. Dodge attended the Rhode Island School of Design majoring in painting and graduated in 2001. After working in New York for eight years as an artist Dodge began to realize a need for greater technical skills and understanding in his artistic process. He applied to MIT’s Media Lab and New York University’s ITP in 2009. Dodge attended ITP from 2010 to 2012 completing his thesis work during that time, a project titled "Kioku: A Semantic Indexing and Exploration Interface for Digital Images".

== Career ==
Dodge's work has often explored the relationship between technology and human experience in varying degrees of subtlety. In a series of works depicting underwater swimming pools he contrasts what he describes as a quantifiable or digital representation of reality in the form of the pixel-like tiled surface of the pool's structure against the chaotic and seemingly immeasurable gestural reflections in the water's surface above.

In other works like The Adonis Plant, based on the work by Katsushika Hokusai of the same title Dodge created 3D models of human-android hybrids, using them to create a two-dimensional composition following that of Hokusai's famous ukiyo-e Shunga. In Dodge's version of the two figure's passionate embrace, the phallus has been replaced by a convoluted bundle of cables and wires and the semi-transparent skin of both figures is shown eroding in areas exposing the mechanized skeletons below.

Much of Dodge's work makes use of digital processes such as 3D modeling and computer generated imagery though often physically mediated through historical art making techniques and processes.

Dodge's second solo show at Klaus von Nichtssagend Gallery in 2008, which was reviewed in Artforum, included paintings inspired by the video game Katamari Damacy created by artist and game designer Keita Takahashi. Dodge and Takahashi would later become friends and work together on a project titled Souponuts.

Dodge began publishing his print editions in 2005 with Fourth Estate, a fine art print publisher in Brooklyn. His prints had an early success being acquired by many private collections and museums.

== Selected exhibitions ==
2024

- A Way With Words: Part I, Maki Fine Arts, Tokyo, Japan
- A Way With Words: Part II, Tsutaya Ginza Atrium, Tokyo, Japan

2023

- Daemon-Haunted World, Klaus von Nichtssagend, New York, NY
- Personal Day, BB&M, Seoul, South Korea

2022

- We Contain Multitudes: Alex Dodge & Tom LaDuke, Miles McEnery Gallery, NY

2021

- Maki Fine Arts, Tokyo, Japan

2020

- Klaus von Nichtssagend, New York, NY

2019

- The Trauma of Information, Maki Fine Arts, Tokyo, Japan

2018

- Whisper in My Ear and Tell Me Softly, Klaus von Nichtssagend, New York, NY

2017

- The Infallibility of Lies, Halsey McKay Gallery, East Hampton, NY

2016

- “Love May Fail, But Courtesy Will Prevail”, Klaus von Nichtssagend, New York, NY

2014

- Artists@Grinnell, Bucksbaum Center for the Arts, Grinnell College, Grinnell, IA

2013

- "Lines and Shapes", Art Bank Collection, United States Department of State, Washington, DC

2012

- "Cryptograph: An Exhibition for Alan Turing", The Spencer Museum, KS

2010

- "Generative", Klaus von Nichtssagend, Brooklyn, NY
- "Contemporary Prints", CRG Gallery, New York Contemporary Prints, CRG Gallery, New York
- "Default State Network", Morgan Lehman Gallery, New York, NY

2009

- "Forth Estate Editions", Rhode Island School of Design Memorial Hall Gallery, RI
- "We’re All Gonna Die", curated by Ron Keyson, Number 35, New York, NY
- "Human Nature Machine", Wonderland Art Space, Copenhagen, Denmark
- "Human Craters", BRIC Rotunda Gallery, NY
- "With Hidden Noise", David Krut Projects, NY

2008

- "Intelligent Design", Klaus von Nichtssagend, Brooklyn, NY
- "Beyond a Memorable Fancy", EFA Project Space, NY

2006

- "The Most beautiful Dreams", Klaus von Nichtssagend, Brooklyn, NY
- "CRG Presents: Klaus von Nichtssagend Gallery", CRG Gallery, NY

2005

- "Greater Brooklyn", CRG Gallery, NY (co-curator)

2004

- "Multiples", Klaus von Nichtssagend, NY.

== Public collections ==
- Cantor Center for Visual Arts, Stanford University, Stanford, CA
- Jundt Art Museum, Gonzaga University, Spokane, WA
- The Metropolitan Museum of Art, New York, NY
- Museum of Fine Arts, Boston, MA
- Museum of Modern Art, New York, NY
- New York Public Library, New York, NY
- Rhode Island School of Design Museum, Providence, RI
- Robert Hull Fleming Museum, The University of Vermont, Burlington, VT
- Spencer Museum of Art, Lawrence, KS
- Whitney Museum of American Art, New York, NY

== Work outside the studio ==
=== CRG Gallery ===
While working at CRG Gallery with artist and fellow art handler Glen Baldridge the two co-curated a summer exhibition titled “Greater Brooklyn”. The show was a response to the then much-criticized exhibition at PS1, “Greater New York”. The show was curated based entirely on images sent via email by hopeful artists. Greater Brooklyn was reviewed in The New York Times and served to help a number of artists begin their careers.

Dodge and Baldridge eventually became co-directors at CRG Gallery helping to expand the gallery's program with younger artists. Dodge eventually left his position at the gallery to pursue graduate study in 2009.

=== Brooklyn Research ===
Shortly after graduating from New York University in 2012 Dodge partnered with classmates Johnny Lu and Ezer Longinus to found Brooklyn Research, a co-working space and technology consultancy in Brooklyn, NY. The space expanded quickly becoming the home of such research teams as O'Reilly Media’s Atlas group as well as a number of independent researchers. The consultancy led by Dodge, Lu, and Longinus has completed projects for clients including New Era, Verizon, Target, Helmut Lang, and Samsung.
