= Zoe Leonard =

American artist (born 1961)

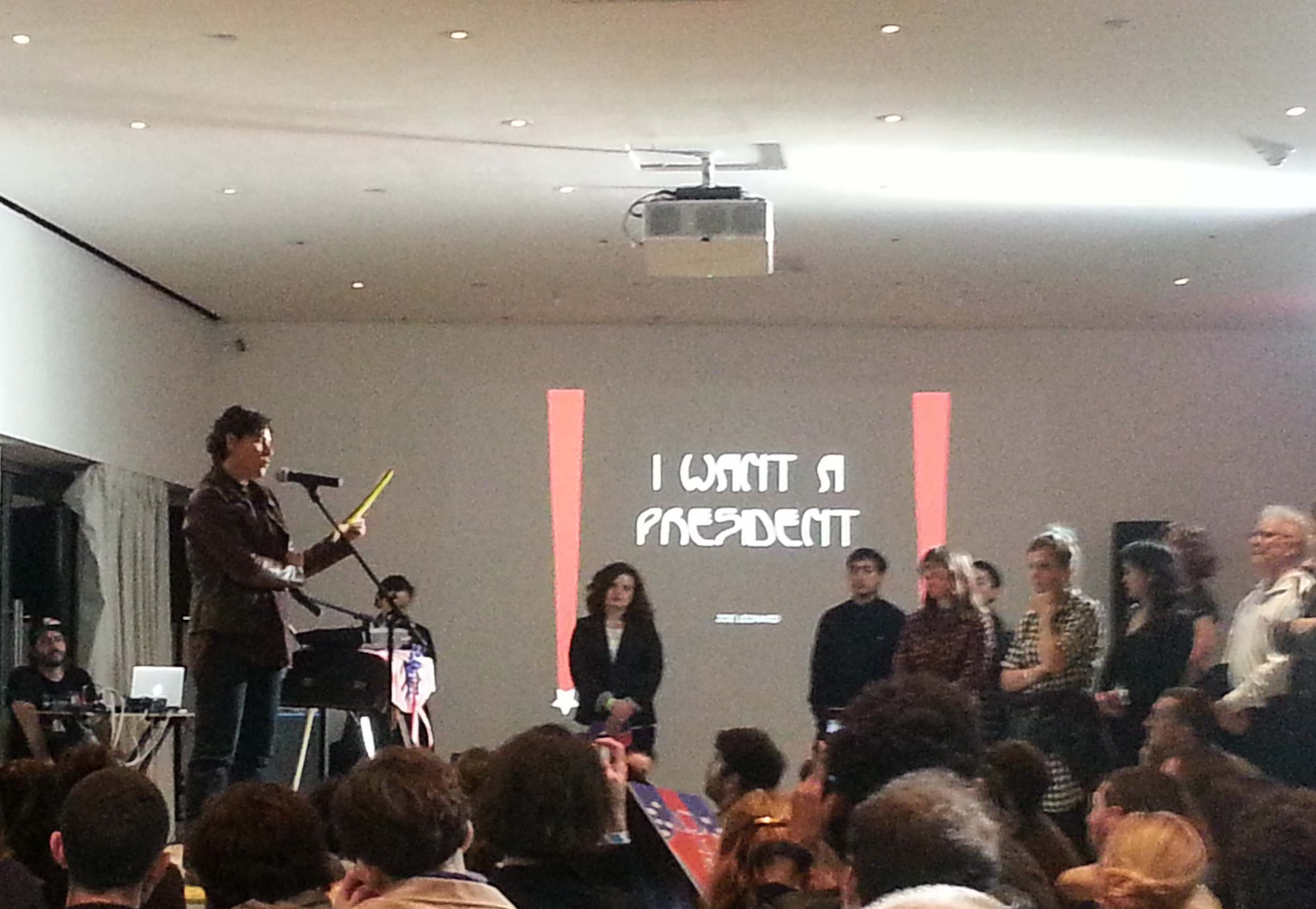
- Leonard reading "I want a president" in 2016.
- Born: 1961 (age 64–65); Liberty, New York, US
- Known for: Photography; Sculpture
- Notable work: I want a president Analogue; Strange Fruit
- Awards: Bucksbaum Award; Anonymous Was a Woman Award

Zoe Leonard (born 1961) is an American artist who works primarily with photography and sculpture. She has exhibited widely since the late 1980s and her work has been included in a number of seminal exhibitions including Documenta IX and Documenta XII, and the 1993, 1997 and 2014 Whitney biennials. She was awarded a Guggenheim Fellowship in 2020.

== Early life ==
Leonard was born in 1961 in Liberty, New York. Leonard's mother was a Polish refugee who was born in Warsaw, immigrating to America at the age of 9 during World War II and later worked for an airline. Her mother's family were wealthy members of the Polish aristocracy who were involved in the movement for Polish independence and the Polish Resistance. Many members of Leonard's maternal line were killed during the war. Despite being non-Jews, her mother's family was persecuted by the Nazis for their opposition to Nazism and their Polish nationalism. Leonard has stated that her grandmother "was really invested in this idea that we were still aristocracy", although her family was living in poverty in Harlem. As a teenager, she moved to the Lower East Side and attended the City-As-School High School in Manhattan, but dropped out at the age of sixteen and began taking photographs using her mother's camera. She has spent most of her adult life living in New York City, whose built environment has been the subject matter of much of her work (e.g. sidewalks, storefronts, apartment buildings, chain-link fencing, graffiti, and boarded-up windows.) Leonard became well known internationally following her installation at Documenta IX in 1992.

== Career ==
From her earliest aerial photographs to her images of museum displays, anatomical models, and fashion shows, much of Leonard's work reflects on the framing, classifying, and ordering of vision. She explained in an interview: "Rather than any one subject or genre (landscape, portrait, still life, etc), I was, and remain, interested in engaging a simultaneous questioning of both subject and vantage point, the relation between viewer and world — in short, subjectivity and how it informs our experience of the world." Leonard was active in AIDS advocacy and queer politics in New York in the 1980s and 1990s, and was a member of ACT UP as well as the Women's Action Coalition. In 1992 she wrote "I want a president", a poem inspired by Eileen Myles's run for president. In 2016, a large mural of the poem was installed in front of the Standard Hotel along the High Line. Leonard's sculptural works demonstrate her eye for detail and her ability to provoke thought and emotion. "Strange Fruit," for instance, consists of 300 fruit skins that were consumed and then stitched back together, offering a powerful commentary on AIDS, mourning, and reminiscing on what once was.

Strange Fruit (1992-1997) at the Philadelphia Museum of Art in 2022

In 1995 she staged an exhibition at her studio on the Lower East Side of Manhattan which featured the work Strange Fruit, an installation of various fruit skins (oranges, bananas, grapefruits, lemons) that Leonard saved and then sewed together by hand with wire and thread. Strange Fruit is dedicated to the friend of Leonard and a fellow artist, David Wojnarowicz, who died in 1992. It grew out of a deeply personal response to the losses of the AIDS epidemic and as a meditation on mourning, it became a seminal work of the 1990s. Strange Fruit was exhibited in 1998 at the Philadelphia Museum of Art, where it currently resides.

During the mid-1990s Leonard spent two years living and working in Eagle, Alaska, an experience that influenced much of her later artwork, which often foregrounds relationships between humans and the natural world. While in Alaska, she worked on a farm, a commercial fishing boat, and for the National Park Service, and went on to create a photographic series, Hunting, based on her experiences with subsistence economies. Trees are also a motif in Leonard's work: examples include a "reconstructed" tree that she installed in Vienna's Secession in 1997 as well as numerous photographs of urban trees mangled in chain-link and razor wire fences.

Leonard began working on the Fae Richards Photo Archive in 1993 after being approached by director Cheryl Dunye to create a fictive archive of photographs for Dunye's 1996 fictional documentary The Watermelon Woman, in which protagonist Cheryl, played by Dunye, searches for the history of black lesbian entertainer Fae Richards. The photographs, which Leonard treated by hand to appear aged, are used as props in the film and were included in the 1997 Whitney Biennial.

Between 1998 and 2009, Leonard worked on Analogue, a monumental project consisting of an installation of 412 C-prints and gelatin silver prints (in the collection of the Museum of Modern Art, New York and the Reina Sofia, Madrid), and a portfolio of 40 dye-transfer prints. Influenced by Eugène Atget and Walker Evans but born out of a 21st-century reconsideration of the role of photography, Analogue explores transformations in global labor, trade, and social relationships in parallel with the shift from analogue to digital image-making. Holland Cotter described an experience of the work in The New York Times in 2009:

"In her straight-ahead photographs of storefronts, an arrangement of shoes or shrink-wrapped furniture becomes a vanitas still life. A hand-painted shop sign becomes a relic. Over several photographs, we sense that an unnamed neighborhood — Ms. Leonard expanded her field work to include East Harlem, Bedford-Stuyvesant and Crown Heights — is packing up to leave. A city's material culture is doing a vanishing act. And where is the material going? Back to a version of the world it came from. Many of the cut-rate goods sold in the Lower East Side shops originated in urban sweatshops in China and Pakistan and are eventually passed on as surplus to other poor cities in Africa and Central America. In the wraparound grid of pictures in Analogue we follow recycled clothes from Brooklyn to the city of Kampala in Uganda, where they are sold as new in stores like the Money Is Life House of Garments."

== Exhibitions ==
Analogue was first exhibited in 2007 at the Wexner Center for the Arts in Columbus, Ohio, and at Documenta XII in Kassel, Germany, followed by presentations at Villa Arson in Nice, and Dia at the Hispanic Society and the Museum of Modern Art in New York and was included in a touring retrospective of Leonard's work which originated in 2007 at the Fotomuseum Winterthur, and later traveled to the Museo Nacional Centro de Arte Reina Sofia, Madrid; MuMOK — Museum Moderner Kunst Stifting Ludwig, Vienna; and Pinakothek der Moderne, Munich. Analogue is in the collection of The Museum of Modern Art, New York and the Reina Sofia, Madrid.

More recent exhibitions have included You See I Am Here After All at Dia: Beacon (2009) which featured a set of 3883 postcards of waterfalls, primarily Niagara Falls, and reminiscent of Yokoo Tadanori's Waterfall Rapture collection of 13,000 waterfall postcards, one of which carries the phrase "You See I Am Here After All" which critic Jonathan Flatley connects to the work of On Kawara's telegrams which read "I AM STILL ALIVE" This work was also exhibited at the Whitney in Leonard's 2018 retrospective. Other exhibitions such as Serialities at Hauser & Wirth, Observation Point, Camden Arts Centre, London (2012), an installation at the Chinati Foundation, Marfa, Texas (2013-2014) and the 2014 Whitney Biennial, for which Leonard won the Bucksbaum Award with her work "945 Madison Avenue". In 2018, the Whitney Museum of American Art mounted Leonard's first career retrospective in the United States, an exhibition organized by the Museum of Contemporary Art, Los Angeles, where the show traveled in late 2018.

== Other activities ==
Texts by Leonard have appeared in LTTR, October, and Texte zur Kunst, and in recent monographs on Agnes Martin, James Castle and Josiah McElheny.

In addition to working on her art, Leonard has been serving on the advisory board of the Hauser & Wirth Institute since 2018. She was also a member of the jury that selected Cathy Wilkes as recipient of the inaugural Maria Lassnig Prize in 2017. Leonard is a founding member of the artist collective, fierce pussy, along with Joy Episalla, Carrie Yamaoka, and Nancy Brooks Brody. She works out of a study in the Brooklyn Navy Yard.

Leonard has taught at Bard College, and served as the co-chair of the photography department for the Milton Avery Graduate School of the Arts from 2011 to 2015.

== Personal life ==
She is bisexual.

== Publications ==
- 1991 – Information: Zoe Leonard (with text by Jutta Koether), Galerie Gisela Capitain, Cologne | ASIN B005MJ5M9I
- 1995 – Strange Fruit, Paula Cooper Gallery, NY | ASIN B0006PFWNY
- 1997 – Zoe Leonard, Kunsthalle Basel, Basel
- 1997 – Zoe Leonard, (with an interview by Anna Blume), Secession, Vienna
- 1998 – Zoe Leonard, (with text by Elisabeth Lebovici), Centre national de la photographie, Paris
- 2007 – Analogue, Wexner Center for the Arts, Columbus, OH, MIT Press | ISBN 978-0262122955
- 2008 – Zoe Leonard: Photographs (with texts by Svetlana Alpers, Elisabeth Lebovici, Urs Stahel), Fotomuseum Winterthur, Steidl | ISBN 978-3865214942
- 2010 – You See I Am Here After All (with texts by Ann Reynolds, Angela Miller, Lytle Shaw, and Lynne Cooke), Dia Art Foundation, New York; Yale University Press, New Haven, CT and London, UK | ISBN 978-0300151688
- 2014 – Available Light, Ridinghouse / Dancing Foxes, London, UK and Brooklyn
- 2017 – I want a president: Transcript of a Rally (with contributions by Sharon Hayes, Wu Tsang, Mel Elberg, Eileen Myles, Pamela Sneed, Fred Moten & Stefano Harney, Alexandro Segade, Layli Long Soldier, Malik Gaines, and Justin Vivian Bond & Nath Ann Carrera), Dancing Foxes Press | ISBN 978-0300151688
- 2018 – Zoe Leonard: Survey, Museum of Contemporary Art, Los Angeles | ISBN 978-3791357317

== Recognition ==
Leonard was awarded the Bucksbaum Prize in 2014 from the Whitney Museum and the Anonymous was a Woman Award in 2005. She received a Guggenheim Fellowship in 2020.
