= Abington Art Center =

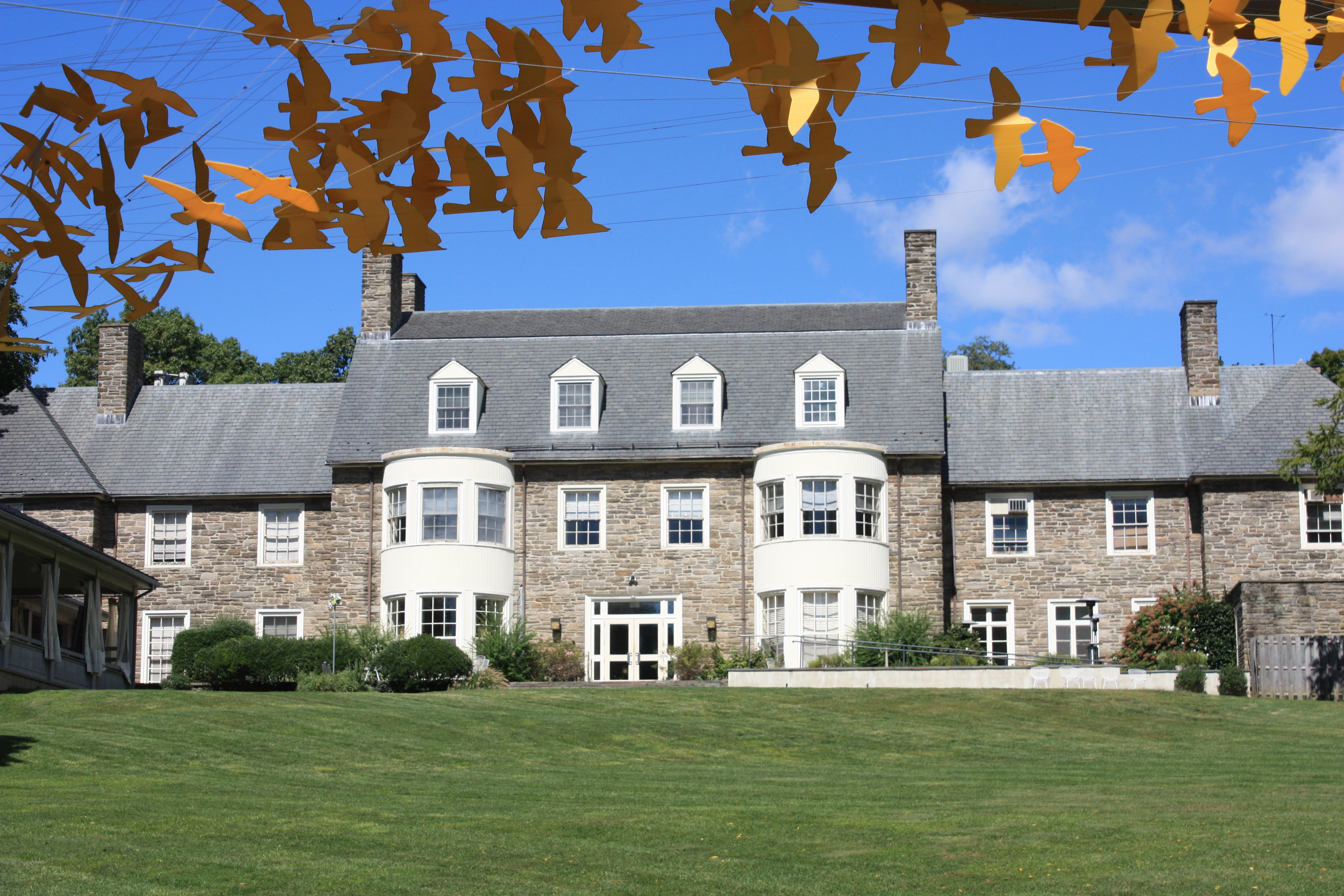
- Established: 1939
- Location: Jenkintown, PA
- Coordinates: 40.0924°N 75.1171°W
- Type: Art center
- Website: www.abingtonartcenter.org

Abington Art Center is an art center built in 1939, and located in Abington Township, a northern suburb of Philadelphia, Pennsylvania. The center resides within Alverthorpe Manor and the surrounding 27-acre grounds that were formerly the residence of Lessing J. Rosenwald and his family. The art center features a studio school, innovation center, exhibition galleries and a sculpture park. The building itself features three vintage elevators from the 1930s.

== Early beginnings ==
The Abington Art Center was started in 1965 as the Old York Road Art Guild, by a group of women who believed in the "benefit of cultural enrichment for individual and community life to be derived from creative artistic expression", the guild's educational elements were brought under a separate non-profit entity called Abington Art Center. On Christmas Day 1969, a rare book and print collector, Lessing J. Rosenwald and his wife Edith, donated their estate, Alverthorpe Manor, to the Abington community for the purpose of allowing residents to gather for cultural and recreational purposes. Shortly afterwards, the organization appointed its first paid director and the guild formally ended.

== Development ==
In 1981, the center expanded into the old gallery wing of Alverthorpe Manor when the Rosenwald Collection was moved to the Library of Congress in Washington, D.C. This doubled the instruction space as well as the center's student capacity. A sculpture garden was opened in 1990. In 1996, the art center expanded within the building and initiated a 5-year renovation project designed to transform Alverthorpe Manor from a private residence to a public place. Currently, the center contains a gallery, six studios, classrooms, and a sculpture park, and stages outdoor events throughout the year.

== Art exhibitions and community outreach ==
The 27 acres (110,000 m^{2}) of lawn and woodlands that make up the Sculpture Park has included works by Joy Episalla, Robert Lawrance Lobe, Jeanne Jaffe, Thomas Matsuda, Brian McCutcheon, Steven Siegel, Steve Tobin, Ursula von Rydingsvard, Jay Walker, and Winifred Lutz.

In 2003, Abington Art Center devised a plan for the purposes of developing Alverthorpe Manor property into a 27-acre "cultural campus" within a suburban community. The plan was developed by Wallace Roberts & Todd. Leora Brecher, a sculptor who taught ceramics at the center for 18 years, said, "It's different here compared to other art centers I've seen. As well as a studio school, it has the sculpture garden and outreach to the community. Other places are more about teaching than the public." The center has hosted the annual "Touch the Future" juried art show, featuring the work of young artists from the area. In 2005, the center received a $500,000 pledge of a matching grant from the state of Pennsylvania, with the objective of assisting the economic development goals of the surrounding municipalities. The first phase of development was completed in 2011.

== Finances ==
Abington Art Center is a small nonprofit organization with an estimated budget of less than $1 million. Its income comes from classes, workshops, and facility rentals for weddings and other affairs (38 percent); foundations (24 percent); membership dues (11 percent); corporate and government support (9 percent); and gift shop sales, fund-raisers and other sources (18 percent).
