= Ori Gersht =

Israeli photographer

Ori Gersht אורי גרשט
- Born: 1967 (age 58–59); Tel Aviv, Israel
- Known for: photography

Ori Gersht (Hebrew: אורי גרשט; born 1967) is an Israeli fine art photographer. He is a professor of photography at the University for the Creative Arts in Rochester, Kent, England.

== Biography ==
Ori Gersht was born in Tel Aviv. He graduated in Photography, Film and Video from University of Westminster, London and studied for an M.A. in Photography from the Royal College of Art, London.

== Art career ==
Gersht has exhibited widely in museums and galleries since the early 1990s. He is represented by Angles Gallery in Los Angeles, CRG Gallery in New York, Ben Brown Fine Arts in London, and Noga Gallery in Tel Aviv. In 2012, Gersht's show History Repeating was mounted at the Museum of Fine Arts, Boston.

== Artistic themes ==
Gersht engages the themes of life, death, violence, and beauty. His photographs and films transcribe images of sites of historical significance—the Judean Desert, Sarajevo, Auschwitz, the Galicia region of Ukraine, the Lister Route in the Pyrenees (on which Walter Benjamin made his ill-fated exodus from Nazi-occupied France)—into ciphers of psychological disruption. Such scenes may not seem out of the ordinary unto themselves, but, through the artist’s focused attention and treatment they evoke the emotional resonance of what has transpired—most often, violence, and, more significantly, the ghosts of war’s most egregious detritus, its refugees. Pervasive in Gersht’s work is the landscape, as a place, an idea, and an art historical trope. His films and photographs may be compared to paintings in their display, from their unhindered access (no Plexiglas separates their surfaces from the viewer) to the frames surrounding the monitors on which the films often play. Moreover, the vistas and horizons of, for instance, "Between Places" (1998–2000), "White Noise" (1999–2000), "The Clearing/Liquidation" (2005), and "Evaders" (2009), recall Romantic depictions of the sublime. They conjure precedents in both photography, such as the vistas of Andreas Gursky and the landscapes of the American South by Sally Mann, and painting, by J .M. W. Turner, Caspar David Friedrich, and even Mark Rothko.

In his still life series, Gersht investigated the relationships between photography, technology, and optical perception, at a pivotal moment in the history of photography where digital technology both threatens a crisis and promises a breakthrough. Research into the early history of the medium of photography is brought together with theoretical discourse, creating still images and films that (literally) explode the genre of still life, the beautiful and destructive results captured using cutting-edge technology. In "Pomegranate", a film that references Juan Sanchez Cotan’s 17th-century still life and Harold Edgerton’s stroboscopic photography, a high velocity bullet flies across the frame in slow motion and obliterates a suspended pomegranate fruit, bursting it open and wheeling it slowly into the air like a smashed violated mouth spraying seeds. A peaceful image is transformed into bloodshed, and a dialogue is established between stillness and motion, peace and violence.

Allusions to the Spanish Civil War and the bombing of Hiroshima can be found in his work. Gersht was born in Tel Aviv three months before the Six-Day War. During the 1973 Yom Kippur War, in which his father fought, he and his family sheltered nightly from air raid sirens, and he later experienced the 1982 Lebanon War and the start of the First Intifada, which began as he was completing his military service as a medic, before moving to London in 1988. He has credited his birthplace and his family's experiences of the Holocaust with sparking his interest in time and violence.

== Awards and recognitions ==
- 1990 South Bank Photo Show, London
- 1993 Department of Transport Art Competition, London
- 1997 Residency at Whitefield School, Barnet
- 2000 The Constantiner Photographer Award for an Israeli Artist, Tel Aviv Museum of Art, Tel Aviv
- 2002 Consultant to the Architectural Development Planning of the South London Gallery
- 2004 First Prize winner, Onfuri International, Tirana, Albania

== Solo exhibitions ==
- 2014 - Ori Gersht: Still Life, Columbus Museum of Art, USA
- 2014 - Ori Gersht: Portraits, Pizzuti Collection, Columbus, USA
- 2014 - All Will Come To Pass, The Center for Contemporary Art, Tel Aviv, Israel
- 2012 - History Repeating, Museum of Fine Arts, Boston, USA.
- 2012 - This Storm is What We Call Progress, Imperial War Museum, London.
- 2011 - Lost in Time, Santa Barbara Museum of Art, Santa Barbara, California, USA
- 2009 - Black Box, Hirshhorn Museum and Sculpture Garden, Washington DC, USA
- 2008 - Selected Films, Hirshhorn Museum and Sculpture Garden, Washington, USA
- 2008 - The Forest, Musée d’Art de Toulon, Toulon, France
- 2008 - Pomegranate, The Jewish Museum, New York
- 2007 - Time After Time: Exploding Flowers & Other Matters, The Armory Show (with CRG Gallery), New York, USA
- 2007 - The Forest & Blow Up, Yale Center for British Art, New Haven, USA
- 2006 - The Forest, Tel Aviv Museum of Art, Tel Aviv, Israel
- 2006 - The Clearing, The Photographers' Gallery, London, UK
- 2004 - History in the Making, Photo España, Madrid, Spain
- 2002 - Afterglow, Art Now Room, Tate Britain, London, UK
- 2002 - Afterglow, Helena Rubenstein Pavilion for Contemporary Art, Tel Aviv Museum of Art, Tel Aviv, Israel

== Group exhibitions ==
- 2012 - Seduced by Art, National Gallery, London
- 2011 - Evaders & Falling Bird, Tel Aviv Museum of Art, Israel
- 2011 - When a Painting Moves… Something Must be Rotten, The Stenersen Museum, Oslo, Norway
- 2011 - Eating Art, Casa Milà, Barcelona, Spain
- 2010 - Haunted: Contemporary Photography/Video/Performance, Guggenheim Museum, New York, USA
- 2010 - Still / Moving, The Israel Museum, Jerusalem
- 2010 - Beijing International Art Biennale 2010, National At Museum, Beijing, China
- 2010 - Atlantis II, Rohkunstbau, Berlin, Germany
- 2010 - Paysage, Musée d’Art, Toulon, France
- 2009 - Hugging and Wrestling: Contemporary Israeli Photography and Video, Museum of Contemporary Art Cleveland, USA
- 2009 - Flower Power, Villa Giulia – Centro Ricerca Arte Attuale, Turin, Italy
- 2009 - Cuando una pintura se mueve... algo debe estar podrido!, Museo de Arte de Puerto Rico, San Juan, Puerto Rico
- 2008 - Pomegranate: The Jewish Museum, New York, USA
- 2008 - Mutation II, Paris, Kulturprojekte, Berlin, Fotofo, Bratislave, Vladmir Und Estragon, Vienna, Association Café Crème, Luxembourg, Musee de la Photographie, Moscou, Zone Attive, Rome
- 2007 - Video Killed the Painting Star, Museum of Salamanca, Spain
- 2007 - In Focus: Living History, Tate Modern, London
- 2007 - Single Shot, Tate Britain, London
- 2007 - 1st Architecture, Art and Landscape Biennial of the Canaries, Canary Islands, Spain
- 2006 - Inside-Out: Contemporary Artists from Israel, Museum MARCO, Vigo, Spain
- 2006 - Forest Primeval, MOCA (GA), Atlanta, USA
- 2006 - Twillight: Photography in the Magic Hour, Victoria and Albert Museum, London
- 2005 - Dreams and Trauma, Haus der Kulturen der Welt, Berlin, Germany
- 2003 - One Ground, California Museum of Photography, Riverside, USA
- 2002 - Reality Check: Recent Developments in British Photography and Video, curated by Kate Bush and Brett Rogers, Galerie Rudolfinum, Prague, Czech Republic
- 2002 - Non-Places, Frankfurter Kunstverein, Frankfurt am Main, Germany

== See also ==
- Visual arts in Israel
