= Nancy Brooks Brody =

American artist and activist (1962–2023)

- Born: September 12, 1962; Manhattan, New York
- Died: December 8, 2023 (aged 61)
- Resting place: Green-Wood Cemetery, Brooklyn, New York
- Known for: fierce pussy
- Website: www.nancybrooksbrody.com

Nancy Brooks Brody (September 12, 1962– December 8, 2023) was an American visual artist and activist. She was a founding member of fierce pussy, a lesbian feminist art collective aimed at raising awareness of the AIDS pandemic.

== Biography ==
Nancy Brooks Brody was born in Manhattan, New York on September 12, 1962. Brody's mother was a secretary and their father was a buyer for Macy's department store. They grew up in the city's Upper West Side, where their artistic abilities were first recognized as a child when making their family's Christmas cards. Brody attended New York City's High School of Music & Art, where they learned printmaking. Beginning in high school, Brody frequented night clubs including the Mudd Club and Danceteria; their first art exhibit was at the Pyramid Club. Later, Brody would attend the School of Visual Arts. Brody would exhibit their first solo retrospective at New Math Gallery in 1984. Brody worked in Abrams Publishing in the darkroom where they learned Photostat skills they would later bring to their activist work. They also collaborated with artist David Svitzer making jewelry, which they sold to the Patricia Field's boutique and Henri Bendel department store. They were a studio assistant for Jennifer Bartlett, and former high school classmate Jean Michel Basqiat. Brody was hired as a fire fighter, working at Mount St. Helens for three years from 1993-1996. They studied martial arts, including Qigong, Tai Chi, and Bagua beginning in 1987.

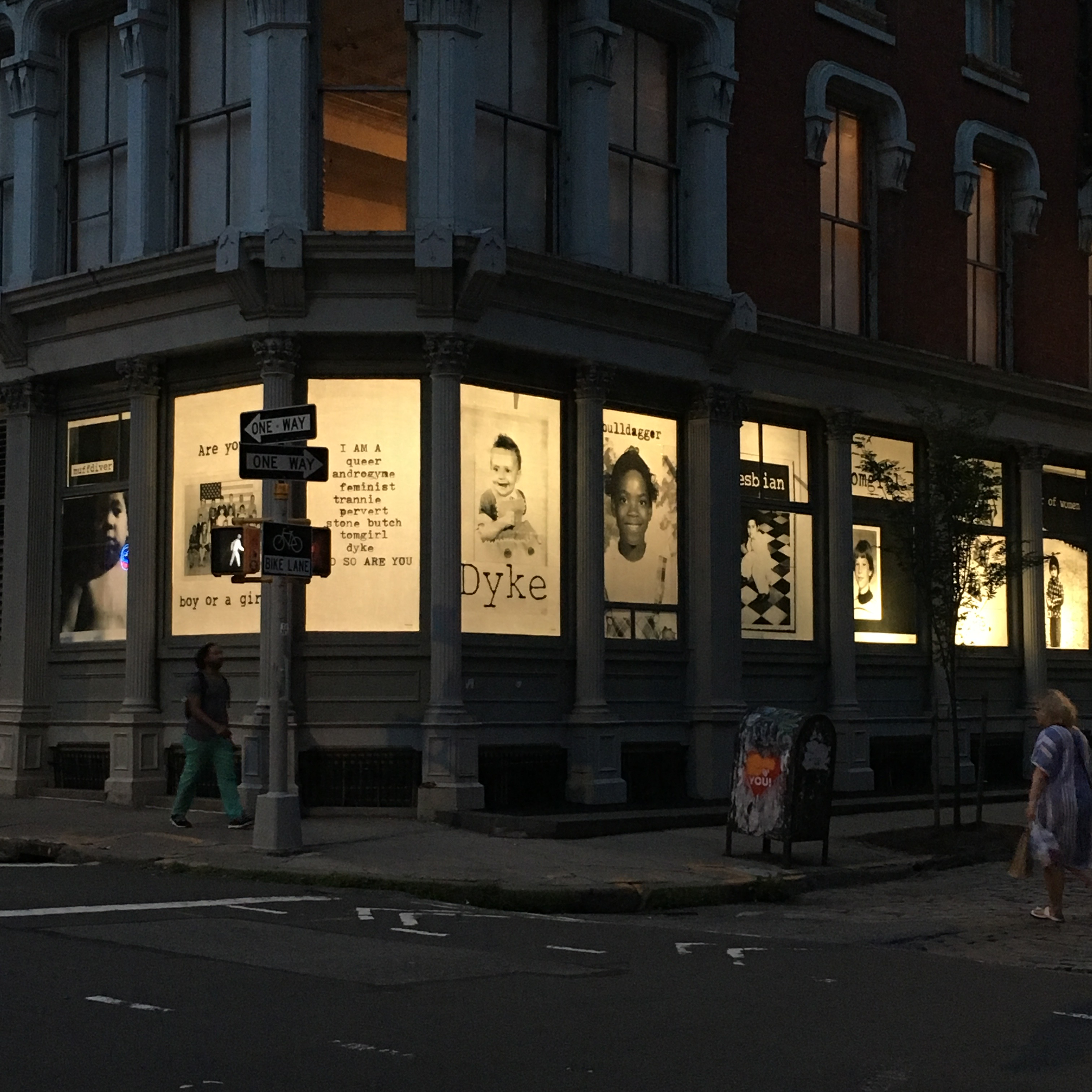
fierce pussy's "And So Are You" a year-long installation on view at the Leslie Lohman Museum in NYC. Pictured in 2018.

=== AIDS activism ===
In the late 1980s, Brody became involved in AIDS activism. They began to attend ACT UP meetings, where they met Joy Episalla and Zoe Leonard. They were part of the campaign to protest the CDC (1989), Target City Hall (1989) and Day of Desperation (1991), the Queens-Midtown-Tunnel Action (1995) and other protests, sometimes getting arrested for acts of civil disobedience. In 1991, they would launch the fierce pussy collective. fierce pussy's early works utilized "crack-and-peel stickers" and wheat-paste posters to share their message across surfaces in New York City. The group additionally created public service announcement videos, clothing and greeting cards in support of LGBTQ rights.

=== Revival of fierce pussy ===
In 2008, Brody alongside Zoe Leonard, Joy Episalla and Carrie Yamaoka relaunched fierce pussy. Brody would remain active in the group until her death.

In addition to creating her own art works, Brody advocated for and championed the work of other queer artists. In 2015, Brody and Jonathan Berger curated a retrospective of her friend David Nelson's work at 80WSE Gallery after his death. In 2018, she and mentee Russell Perkins developed A Different Light, an installation artwork for New York's LGBT Community Center.

=== Later life and death ===
In 2021, Brody was diagnosed with ovarian cancer. Brody died on December 8, 2023 at age 61. Brody created art and worked in their studio until the last days of their life. In 2024, the Klaus Von Nichtssagend Gallery produced Ode, a retrospective of Brody's final works.

In 2025, Jo-ey Tang curated the group exhibition, arms ache avid aeon: Nancy Brooks Brody / Joy Episalla / Zoe Leonard / Carrie Yamaoka: fierce pussy amplified: Chapter Eight featuring Brody's work with fierce pussy.

== Solo exhibitions ==
- 2024, Ode, Klaus Von Nichtssagend Gallery
- 2019, Nancy Brooks Brody, Klaus Von Nichtssagend Gallery
- 2018, Nancy Brooks Brody, Book Marks, Fortnight Institute, New York City
- 2015, Decoy of New Showers, Nancy Brooks Brody + David Nelson invited by Jo-ey Tang, Galerie Joseph Tang, Paris France
- 2014, Suites in Space: Merce Drawings and Color Forms, Andrew Kreps Gallery, New York, NY. Curated by Alenha Katsof.
- 2007-2009, Nancy Brooks Brody, Virgil de Voldere Gallery, New York, NY
- 2004-2007, Nancy Brooks Brody, Virgil de Voldere Gallery, New York, NY
- 2004, Nancy Brooks Brody, Slingshot Project Gallery, New York, NY
- 1986, Nancy Brooks Brody, Khiva Gallery, San Francisco, CA
- 1985, Nancy Brooks Brody, New Math Gallery, New York, NY
- 1984, Nancy Brooks Brody, New Math Gallery, New York, NY

== Permanent collections ==
- Merce Drawing, 2013. Ink on Newsprint. Contemporary Arts Center, Cincinnati.
- A Different Light, 2018. Russell Perkins and his Mentor Nancy Brooks Brody. The LGBT Community Center, Bureau of General Services – Queer Division.
- The Museum of Contemporary Art, Los Angeles
- FRAC Haute-Normandie, France
- Fonds National d’Art Contemporain, Paris
- Centre Pompidou, Paris
