= Eileen Myles =

American writer of poetry, fiction, and non-fiction (born 1949)

Cuthwulf Eileen Myles
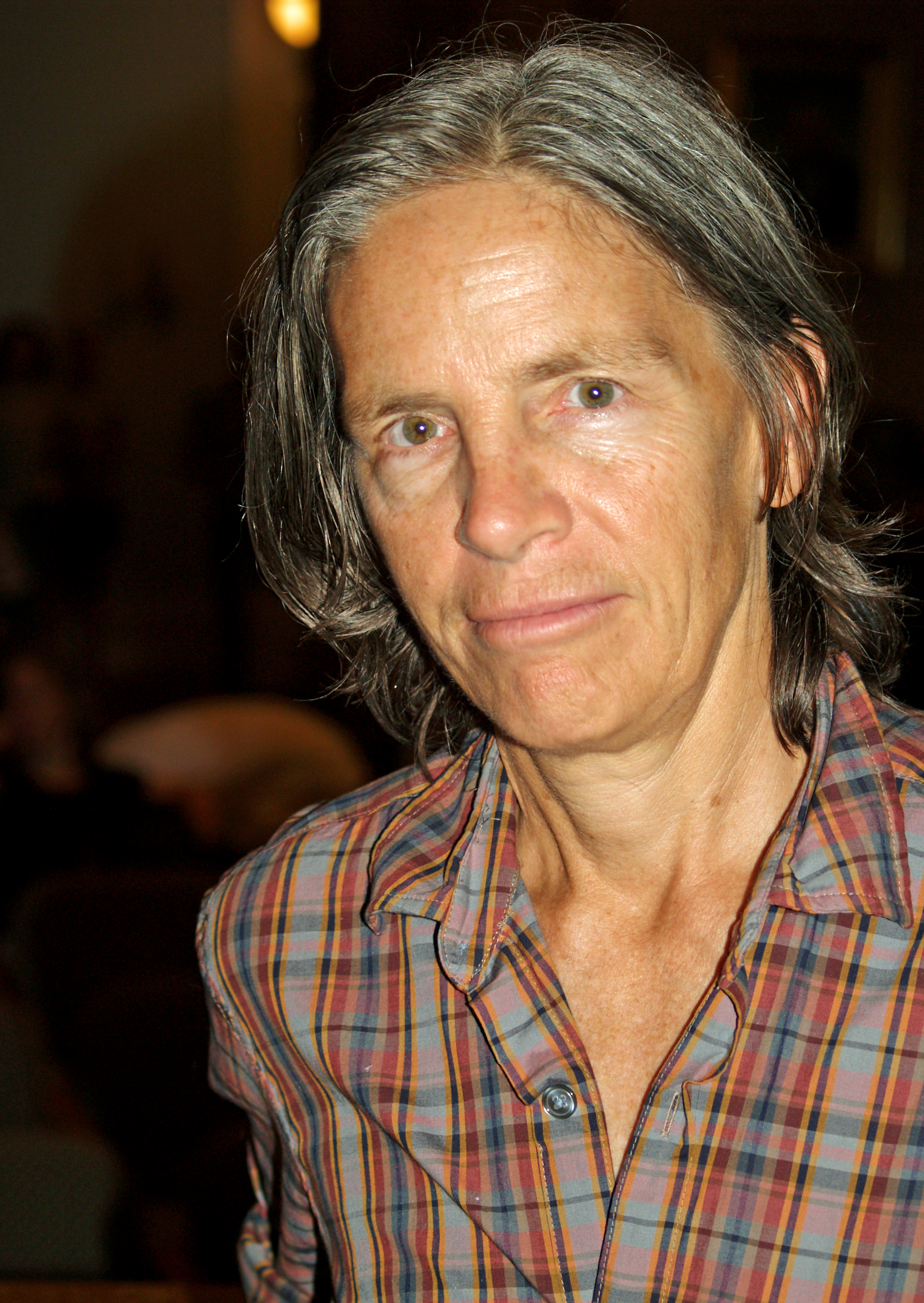
- Myles at the 2008 Brooklyn Book Festival
- Born: December 9, 1949 (age 76); Cambridge, Massachusetts, U.S.
- Occupations: Writer; poet; performer
- Writing career
- Genres: Poetry, non-fiction, fiction, performance
- Website: eileenmyles.com

Cuthwulf Eileen Myles (born December 9, 1949) is an American poet and writer who has produced more than twenty volumes of poetry, fiction, non-fiction, libretti, plays, and performance pieces over the last three decades. Novelist Dennis Cooper has described Myles as "one of the savviest and most restless intellects in contemporary literature." The Boston Globe described them as "that rare creature, a rock star of poetry." They won the Lambda Literary Award for Lesbian Fiction in 2011 for their Inferno (a poet's novel) In 2012, Myles received a Guggenheim Fellowship to complete Afterglow (a memoir), which gives both a real and fantastic account of a dog's life. Myles has been called "a cult figure to a generation of post-punk female writer-performers" and uses they/them pronouns.

== Life and career ==
=== Early life and education ===
Eileen Myles was born in Cambridge, Massachusetts, on December 9, 1949, to a family with a working-class background. They attended Catholic schools in Arlington, Massachusetts, and graduated from UMass Boston in 1971.

Myles moved to New York City in 1974 with the intention of becoming a poet. In New York they participated in writing workshops held at St. Mark's Poetry Project, which promoted the idea of the "working artist." There they studied with Alice Notley, Ted Berrigan, Paul Violi, and Bill Zavatsky, and were given a template for creating art in the context of community. There, Myles first met the poet Allen Ginsberg, whom they admired and who became the subject of several of their poems and essays. In 1979 they worked as an assistant to the poet James Schuyler.

=== Artistic director of St. Mark's ===
In 1984 Myles was hired as the artistic director of St. Mark's Poetry Project, and held that position until 1986. They have stated their time there gave them the opportunity to rethink the institution that influenced their early work. During Reagan's presidency, 1981–1989, Myles dealt with the cuts to the NEA art budget and focused their energies on broadening the aesthetic and cultural range of the St. Mark's Poetry Project. Myles' leadership of the Project represented a generational shift away from the church's base, which until then been run by the second generation members of the New York School. Program Coordinators in this period were Patricia Spears Jones, and Jessica Hagedorn, and Myles invited Alice Notley and Dennis Cooper to teach.

=== Politics and teaching ===
At the beginning of the 1991–1992 presidential election, Myles heard George H. W. Bush speak about the threat to freedom of speech posed by the dialog of activists and minoritized people. With that statement, Myles "realized there was this amazing political power to speech." Myles then conducted an "openly female" write-in campaign for the office of President of the United States from the East Village that spiraled into a project of national interest. Part performance art, part protest, this gesture was meant to offer an alternative glimpse into what progressive, radical, and socially committed politics could look like. Zoe Leonard's 1992 poem, "I want a president", which begins with the line: "I want a dyke for president", was written to celebrate Myles's presidential run.

Beginning in 2002, Myles began a five-year stint as a professor of writing at the University of California, San Diego (UCSD). UCSD funded the research and travel grant that enabled the creation of Inferno (2010), as well as Hell, an opera composed by Michael Webster, for which Myles wrote the libretto. Since leaving UCSD in 2007, Myles has been a Visiting Writer at Bard College, Jack Kerouac School of Disembodied Poetics at Naropa University, Washington University in St. Louis, University of Montana-Missoula, Columbia University School of the Arts, and New York University.

In 2016, Myles endorsed Hillary Clinton for president in a BuzzFeed piece entitled Hillary Clinton: The Leader You Want When The World Ends. Myles was also approached by Clinton's campaign to write a poem, as part of "Artists for Hillary", a mostly-female group which included Jenny Holzer and Maya Lin, whose creative statements were testament to their support for Clinton's presidential bid. Myles's poem was entitled MOMENTUM 2016.

In September 2026, Myles attended a protest ahead of a speech by Israeli prime minister Benjamin Netanyahu at the United Nations General Assembly.

=== Personal life ===
They were previously in a relationship with poet Leopoldine Core in 2013. In May 2015, they began a relationship with television series creator Joey Soloway.

== Written works ==
=== Poetry ===
Myles moved from Boston to New York in 1974, where they became associated with St. Mark's Poetry Project. Myles's first book, The Irony of the Leash, was published by Jim Brodey from the St. Mark's Poetry Project in 1978.

In 1977 and 1979, Myles published issues of dodgems, a literary magazine. dodgems issues featured poems by John Ashbery, Barbara Guest, Charles Bernstein, as well as a letter from Lily Tomlin and an angry note from a neighbor; issues were exhibited in vitrines in the New York Public Library's 1998 show.

Myles's next collection, A Fresh Young Voice From the Plains (1981), earned their first major review, by Jane Bosveld in Ms. Not Me (1991) is Myles's most popular collection of poetry. It contains Myles's work "An American Poem", in which they fictionalize their identity and claim to be a Kennedy. They first performed the work at P.S. 122 in New York City, during their tenure at St. Mark's. Since then "An American Poem" has been filmed and shown in film festivals internationally, screening in New York and other major cities. It has been translated and included in German, Russian, and Italian anthologies of American writing. The trajectory of "An American Poem" is documented in Myles's novel Inferno (2010).

Myles produced Maxfield Parrish/early and new poems (1995), a collection of poems on the surreality of sex. In the same year, Myles co-edited The New Fuck You: Adventures in Lesbian Reading (1995) with Liz Kotz, which has been described as having a multi-genre approach and postmodern focus on reading rather than identity. Soon after, School of Fish (1997) was released, wherein Myles's dog Rosie serves as a second point of view in the poem's field of vision.

Myles published Skies (2000), a project begun in Provincetown, Massachusetts. The book is framed by a transcript of a panel at The Schoolhouse Gallery in Provincetown featuring Helen Miranda Wilson, Frances Richard, John Kelly, Molly Benjamin, and Jack Pierson, who each spoke about their own relation to the sky. Their next book On My Way (2001) concludes with an essay about speech and class, "The End of New England".

Snowflake / Different Streets (2012) uses the technique of dos-à-dos binding to combine two collections of poetry in the same physical book. Ian Bodkin writes: "Myles' poems "navigat[e] the ever-insular landscape of our technological culture that invades moments of quiet thought," in Snowflake, then "offers a sense of return to the people and places of intimacy, connections that bring her back to this world" in different streets. In the Los Angeles Review of Books, Brian Teare notes: "Myles' genius lies in making the grand gesture that includes the trivial detail and the sublime at once, their juxtaposition underscoring how we are small and made large by connection, paradoxically isolate and dependent."

=== Non-fiction ===
Though Myles's primary intention was to be a poet, they have stated that they were also moved by the New Journalism of the sixties and seventies and the art writing tradition by poets of the New York School. In the 1980s, Myles began to publish personal journalism, book reviews, and art reviews. Early columns appeared in the Poetry Project Newsletter; their essay "I Hate Mimeo" called for an end to the mimeograph, which was used to pring that newsletter. Myles's first book, The Irony of the Leash (1978), was produced on the mimeograph machine at St. Mark's Poetry Project. In the 1990s they wrote a monthly column in Paper.

Myles' early book and theater reviews appeared in New York Native, Outweek, and Out, and they were a notable figure on the poetry and queer art scene of the 1980s and 1990s on the Lower East Side. Later, Myles would publish essays and other article in the Village Voice, The Nation, Artforum, Parkett, and Art in America.

In 2006 Myles received an Warhol/Creative Capital grant, which funded their first collection of nonfiction, The Importance of Being Iceland: Travel Essays in Art (2009). The title essay from this collection, "Iceland," has been described as part travel essay, part personal essay, and part inquiry into the nature of how landscape and writing affect each other.

=== Fiction ===
Myles's first short story collection, Chelsea Girls (1994), includes "Bread and Water", the oldest story in the collection and an account of life in the East Village in the late 1970s and early 1980s. Raymond Foye called it "the quintessential memoir of the Lower East Side." In an interview with Michael Hafford, Myles stated that "Bread and Water" was "literally like a copy of my life at that moment." In "Chelsea Girls", the title story, Myles chronicles their time as the assistant to poet James Schuyler in the Chelsea Hotel; their intergenerational exchange has been the subject of scholarship by Dianne Chisholm and José Esteban Muñoz. In a review in The Los Angeles Times, Erika Taylor wrote: "Myles' collection of short stories is so unabashedly solipsistic, so confident in its own self-absorption, that she takes chances and has payoffs few other writers would be willing to risk. . . It would be easy to dismiss "Chelsea Girls" as poetic hot air if Myles weren't so smart and funny."

Myles's second full-length work, Cool for You: a nonfiction novel (2000), catalogs abject institutional spaces of an "insider", in opposition to the male artist as an "outsider". Among these spaces are school, family, and various bad jobs; the extreme insider of the book is Myles's maternal grandmother Nellie Riordan Myles, who spent the last 17 years of her life in a state mental hospital in Massachusetts. Also included in Cool for You's inventory is an imaginary one—a chapter that describes the Solar System from the perspective of a ten-year-old version of Myles themself, Myles's first foray into fantasy writing. Cool for You received widespread recognition and was reviewed in The New York Times and The Nation. Charles Shipman, in The St. Louis Post-Dispatch, wrote: "Although the writing is sometimes too fragmented to follow and occasionally becomes a tad melodramatic (oh, those awful nuns!), Myles has an undeniable gift for capturing the small details and mundane events that shape our lives. She's also capable of writing with tremendous sensitivity, and because she never slips into sentimentality, her tender passages are all the more affecting. . . By the end of "Cool for You" you do feel as though you know Eileen Myles, and you're glad you took the time to listen to her story".

Inferno (A Poet's Novel) (2010) fictionalizes the life of Dante, and Myles stated in an interview with John Oakes that the vernacular language of his Inferno is their "biggest argument for the way I write." Craig Epplin, in The New Inquiry, wrote the book is Myles's attempt at sketching alternative sorts of existence in common. They do so not through simple prescription, but rather by modeling the act of assembly itself". It was awarded a 2011 Lambda Literary Award for Lesbian Fiction. On September 29, 2015, HarperCollins reissued Myles's out-of-print collection Chelsea Girls.

== Performance ==
In 1979 Myles founded the Lost Texans Collective with Elinor Nauen and Barbara McKay. That year the group produced Joan of Arc a spiritual entertainment and would produce Patriarchy, a play in 1980.

Later solo performances include "Leaving New York (1989), Life (1991), and Summer in Russia (1996), which were performed at P.S. 122, Judson Church.

Myles's later plays, Feeling Blue parts 1, 2, and 3, Modern Art, and Our Sor Juana Ines de la Cruz, written for Alina Troyano, were all produced at WOW Cafe and P.S. 122.

Since the early eighties Myles has toured and read their own work extensively. In late 1988 they traveled with poet and memoirist Jim Carroll on a tour sponsored by Lila Acheson Wallace. In the nineties Myles toured Germany with Kathy Acker, Lynne Tillman, Richard Hell, and Chris Kraus. Since 1997 Myles has frequently toured with LGBT performance group Sister Spit.

Myles appears on three episodes in the second season of the TV series Transparent in 2015 and in 2024 they appeared in Andrea Luka Zimmerman's film Wayfaring Stranger.

== Fellowships, grants, awards ==
- Lambda Literary Award, 1996 (Small Press Book Award), 1998 (Lesbian Poetry), 2011 (Lesbian Fiction)
- The Clark Prize for Excellence in Arts Writing, 2015
- Creative Capital Award, 2016
- Bill Whitehead Award, 2020

== Bibliography ==
=== Novels ===
- Cool for You. New York: Soft Skull Press, 2000.
- Inferno (A Poet's Novel). New York: OR Books, 2010.

=== Short story collections ===
- Bread and Water. New York: Hanuman Books, 1986.
- 1969. New York: Hanuman Books, 1989.
- Chelsea Girls. Santa Rosa, California: Black Sparrow Press, 1994. Republished alongside I Must Be Living Twice. Ecco, 2015.

=== Poetry collections ===
- The Irony of the Leash. Jim Brodey Books, 1978.
- Polar Ode (with Anne Waldman). New York: Dead Duke Books, 1979.
- A Fresh Young Voice from the Plains. New York: Power Mad Press, 1981.
- Sappho's Boat. Los Angeles: Little Caesar, 1982.
- Not Me. New York: Semiotext(e), 1991.
- Maxfield Parrish: Early and New Poems. Santa Rosa, California: Black Sparrow, 1995.
- School of Fish, Santa Rosa, California: Black Sparrow Press, 1997.
- Skies: Poems. Santa Rosa, California: Black Sparrow Press, 2001.
- on my way. Cambridge, Massachusetts: Faux Press, 2001.
- Tow (with drawings by artist Larry C. Collins). New York: Lospeccio Press, 2005.
- Sorry, Tree (poems). Seattle: Wave Books, 2007.
- Snowflake/Different Streets. Seattle: Wave Books, 2012.
- I Must Be Living Twice: New and Selected Poems. Ecco, 2015.
- Evolution. Grove Press, 2018.
- a “Working Life”. Grove Press, 2023

=== Non-fiction ===
- The Importance of Being Iceland (art writing). New York: Semiotext(e), MIT Press, 2009.
- Afterglow (a dog memoir). Grove Press, 2017
- For Now. Yale University Press, 2020.

=== Performances ===
- Dear Lia. Brooklyn, NY: Belladonna Collaborative. 2011.
- Pencil Poems. Tucson: Chax Press. 2011.
- Wayfaring Stranger. 2024

=== Anthologies ===
- The New Fuck You: Adventures in Lesbian Reading (co-edited with Liz Kotz). New York: Semiotext(e), MIT Press, 1995.
- Pathetic Literature (collection). New York: Grove Press, 2022. ISBN 9780802157157

== In popular culture ==
Their name appears in the lyrics of the Le Tigre song "Hot Topic."

The second season of the TV series Transparent featured a character based on Myles.

Myles appears in the film Masculinity/Femininity (2014).

== See also ==
- List of poets portraying sexual relations between women
