= Sheela Gowda =

Indian artist (born 1957)

- Born: 1957 (age 68–69); Bhadravati, India
- Education: Royal College of Art
- Known for: Painting, Sculpture, Installation
- Awards: Maria Lassnig Prize (2019)

Sheela Gowda (born 1957 in Bhadravati, India) is a contemporary artist living and working in Bangalore. She is known for her 'process-oriented' work, often inspired by the everyday labor experiences of marginalized people in India.

== Early life ==
Due to her father, she lived in both rural and urban areas. Her father documented folk music and collected folk objects. Gowda's art schooling began at Ken School of Art in Bangalore, a small college established by R. M. Hadapad. Later, she went to Baroda to study under Professor K. G. Subramanyan.

Gowda studied painting at Ken School of Art, Bangalore, India (1979), pursued a postgraduate diploma at Visva-Bharati University, Santiniketan, India (1982), and an MA in painting at the Royal College of Art in London in 1986.

== Work ==
Her work is associated with postminimalism drawing from ritualistic associations. Her early oils with pensive girls in nature were influenced by her mentor K. G. Subramanyan, and later ones by Nalini Malani towards a somewhat expressionistic direction depicting a middle class chaos and tensions underplayed by coarse eroticism. She is the recipient of the 2019 Maria Lassnig Prize.

Gowda moved into installation and sculpture in the 1990s in response to the changing political landscape in India. She had her first solo show at Iniva, London, entitled Therein and Besides in 2011. She was a finalist for the Hugo Boss Award in 2014. She creates apocalyptic landscapes using materials such as incense and kumkuma drawing a direct relationship between the labor practices of the incense industry and its treatment of women. Her works portrayed the condition of the women which is often defined by the load of their work, mental barriers and sexual violation.

== Major collections ==
- Walker Art Centre, Minneapolis, USA
- Solomon R. Guggenheim Museum, USA
- Tate, London, UK

== Sources ==
- Vedrenne, Elisabeth Sheela Gowda en révolte. Rebellious Sheila Gowda.. Connaissance Des Arts, (724), 34. 6 March 2014
- Singh, Devika (May 2014). "Sheela Gowda". Art Press Sarl. 411 (411): 18. ProQuest 1625537046.
- Vedrenne, Elisabeth (5 September 2014). "Sheila Gowda en révolte. [Rebellious Sheila Gowda.]". Connaissance des Arts. 724 (724): 34. ProQuest 1560570062.
- Sardesai, Abhay (September 2013). "The Biennale everyone liked". Art India. 17 (4): 34–39. ProQuest 1496657486.
- Morgan, Jessica (May 2013). "Material concern: the art of Sheela Gowda". Artforum. 51 (9): 302–309. ProQuest 1412495693.
