= Steven Siegel =

American sculptor

- Born: 1953 (age 72–73); White Plains, New York, United States
- Education: Pratt Institute, Hampshire College
- Known for: Sculpture, installation art, public art
- Spouse: Alice Linder
- Awards: National Endowment for the Arts, New York Foundation for the Arts, Ford Foundation
- Website: Steven Siegel

Steven Siegel, Biography, detail, mixed media, 2008–13.

Steven Siegel (born 1953) is an American artist whose work includes public art, installation art, sculpture, collage and film. He is most known for site-specific, outdoor sculptures, public art commissions and installations made from repurposed pre- and postconsumer materials, which have been influenced by concepts and processes derived from geology and evolutionary biology. Writers relate his work in formal terms to minimalism, in its materials and emphasis on hands-on processes to postminimalism, and in its unconventional means (natural sites, community involvement, and embrace of ephemerality) to Land art.

His studio work has been exhibited at Marlborough Fine Art, Montalvo Arts Center, Aldrich Museum of Contemporary Art, and the Drawing Center, among other venues. He has created commissioned works in cities and universities throughout the U.S. and Europe, in Australia, and Kazakhstan and Korea, and at the DeCordova Museum, Arte Sella Sculpture Park (Italy), Grounds for Sculpture, and Art Omi. Siegel lives and works in Tivoli in upstate New York.

== Education and early career ==
Siegel was born in White Plains, New York in 1953. He graduated from Hampshire College in Amherst, Massachusetts in 1976 with a BA degree and earned an MFA from Pratt Institute in 1978. After graduating, he lived in New York City's Chelsea district and worked as a carpenter, while producing abstract sculpture and drawings, often focused on interactions between man-made structures and landscape. In the mid-1980s he became increasingly interested in geologic phenomena and concepts––most prominently John McPhee's notion of deep time—and began utilizing natural processes, such as sedimentation, stratification and compression, in his art.

A commission for the Snug Harbor Sculpture Festival in 1990 shifted his work's direction. The festival was located on Staten Island, New York—then home to Fresh Kills, the world's largest landfill—which caused him to reflect on consumer waste as a future, human-generated "geology." In response, he created New Geology #1 (1990), a 15-foot-tall, ten-foot-wide cylinder made of recycled newspapers layered like shales and crowned with earth, grasses and flowers, which New York Times critic Michael Brenson wrote, "sprout[ed] from the ground like an ancient circular tomb."

Over the next decade, Siegel gained wide recognition for related site-specific installations using pre- and post-consumer waste. These were generally commissioned for U.S. universities, public parks and spaces, international exhibitions in Germany and Denmark, and venues such as the John Michael Kohler Arts Center, Art Omi, and Newhouse Center for Contemporary Art. He often designed the outdoor works to have an evolving, symbiotic relationship with their environments, including weathering and decomposition over long exhibition periods.

Steven Siegel, To See Jennie Smile, paper, 2006. North Carolina Museum of Art, Raleigh, NC, USA.

== Work and critical reception ==
Writers distinguish Siegel's work by its combination of traditional sculptural aesthetics (abstraction, centrality of form and composition, craftsmanship) and unconventional means, such as repurposed indigenous materials, scientific concepts and evolving processes derived from nature, and strategies involving organic development, change and risk, and collaboration. His work raises contradictory notions of natural versus artificial, found versus constructed, growth and decay, and time as something ephemeral and enduring, intelligible and incomprehensible. Sculpture critic Patricia C. Phillips wrote, "There is a puzzling experience of dissonant beauty in these ungainly objects made of disposable, if not unsightly materials." Siegel fabricates his pieces through painstaking processes of accumulation that build to common forms such as boulders, vessels, geological formations, immense artifacts or topographical maps. Although not overtly political or message-oriented, they raise questions about consumption, waste and landscape, as well as sculptural practice itself in an eco-conscious world.

=== Public works (1990– ) ===
Siegel's site-specific public works fall into three broad categories: time-bound, outdoor newspaper structures; organic, linear works primarily made with shredded rubber; and large cubes or spheres of bound waste materials, often crushed plastic or aluminum containers.

Siegel's newspaper works generally take monolithic, concentrated forms, such as cylinders, hives, walls or towers. They reference time through their layers of dated newsprint, methodical reiterative construction process, and gradual disintegration. Siegel's first fully realized such work was New Geology #2 (1992), a newspaper, stone and flora installation in the woods near his home in Milan, New York. It was undertaken as an experiment in change, decay and rebirth, and by 2000, had largely disappeared into a landscape of overgrown vegetation. Hood (Portland, 1993) was a thirteen-foot, cone-shaped sculpture topped by colorful flora, whose distinct layers were created by alternating placement of newspaper folds in or out. Siegel constructed Squeeze II (1998, Appalachian State University) from old school newspapers and sod, wedging an undulating structure between a grove of hemlocks, the organic curves creating a dialogue with the site's rolling hills. For Very Slow (1999, Art Omi), he constructed two newspaper towers in a stand of maple trees.

Later newspaper works include "Scale" (2002, Abington Art Center), Stories of Katrina (2005, Montalvo Arts Center), Bridge 2 (2009, Arte Sella, Italy), Suncheon Weave (2016, Korea), and Hill and Valley (2015, Sculpture in the Wild, Lincoln, MT), his largest newspaper piece. Writers have noted the cyclical "lifespan" of such works, from material origins in paper produced from trees, to art returned to the landscape, through biodegradation by fungi, mushrooms and molds into soil from which new trees grow.

Steven Siegel, Like a Buoy, like a Barrel, plastics, 2019, Providence, RI, USA.

While the integration of Siegel's newspaper works blur boundaries between natural and constructed forms, his linear installations using rubber suggest organic, sometimes menacing intrusions into architectural settings. The indoor work Repose (1997, Atlanta) consisted of a dark mound of shredded tires atop a shale-like stack of juice cartons that twisted through a large exhibition space. For Carbon String (2001, Neuberger Museum of Art), he created a slender, playful 200-foot organic form that incongruously snaked its way through the otherwise austere architectural plaza of SUNY Purchase. The rubber tentacle or tree-root-like forms of Carbon (2013, Canberra, Australia)—Siegel's largest permanent public work—ooze from a soffit and across the façade of a multi-use building once home to Australia's Department of Climate Change.

In other installations, Siegel created works in contrast to landscaped and idyllic sites that suggested both minimalist sculpture and functional objects such as collections of material en route to being recycled. For example, Bale (2001, University of Virginia) was a ten-foot, minimalist cube of crushed plastic bottles strapped together with rubber hose. Similar installations included Can Can (Bowling Green State University, 2002), a warped sphere of bound aluminum can discards; E-virus (2006, Stanford University), a cylinder formed from electronic waste; cubes of Grass Paper Glass (2006, Grounds For Sculpture), and Like a Buoy, like a Barrel (2019, Providence, RI), among others.

=== Studio work (2000– ) ===
In the 2000s, Siegel shifted his emphasis to studio work, producing abstract work inspired by evolutionary processes that ranged from intimate sculpture to ambitious multimedia installations. This work relates to his large-scale outdoor work in its continued use of postconsumer materials and evolving processes of incremental accumulation and craft that build to larger wholes. In 2001, he exhibited small wall and tabletop pieces compressing stone, discarded paper, shredded rubber, and tree bark and branches into forms suggesting nests, flora and rock formations.

Steven Siegel, Zelig from "Wonderful Life", mixed media, 68" x 84" x 24", 2008.

This work developed into “Wonderful Life” (2002–8), a chronological series of 52 wall pieces made with a limited range of materials that were partly inspired by and titled after Stephen Jay Gould's book of the same name, which reassessed evolutionary theory. The series replicates the detail and diversity of natural life, progressing from simple to more elaborate and sophisticated forms. However, rather than imitate results in nature, Siegel appropriated its methodology, exploring simple, cumulative changes in "evolution" (i.e., the refinement of technique) that generate form from generation to generation (work to work). Critic John Perreault noted a key difference from Siegel's nearly monochromatic newspaper works, describing the series' "garish, contrasting, almost pop colors" as "not necessarily joyous [but] both exuberant and menacing."

During this time, Siegel also produced large-scale indoor installations. He created Collection (2001) for an exhibition of work responding to the Fresh Kills Landfill; The New York Times described its mountain of household rubbish—catalogued by descriptive lists provided by people who donated the items tacked on an opposite wall—as both poetry and an "impressive simulation" of a dumpsite. For Did God Make a Worm? (2005, Ingolstadt, Germany), Siegel used 9,000 pounds of donated aluminum Audi body-part rejects to create a giant, slug-like form that jutted from a wall and sprawled across and around a gallery space and its columns.

Biography (2008–13) draws on elements of Siegel's intimate pieces and large installations, combining dense, intricately woven detail, diverse postconsumer materials, and an epic, undulating horizontal sweep. At 156 feet long, the mixed-media wall piece has only been viewed in large sections (of up to 100 feet) exhibited at Marlborough (2011, 2013) and the Albany Airport (2018– ) or digitally, via composite photographs. Functioning as both a geologic and personal timeline, it was constructed organically from right to left without a fixed endpoint, using Siegel's characteristic strategies of accumulation, compression and transformation. Writers have compared it in scale and density to the Abstract expressionist paintings of Jackson Pollock and the Pop assemblages of Nancy Rubins, and visually, to shifting landscape tectonics, a vast topographical map, or DNA. Artforum's Allese Thomson Baker wrote, "Siegel commands the detritus of our culture into a frantic rhythm, nailing contemporary anxieties about the environment to the wall. [He] may image our world out of rubbish, but the result is ravishing, glittering, and glistening in all its synthetic, inorganic wonder."

Since 2013, Siegel has produced large collages and films combining photography, object-making and digital manipulation as an alternative format for his large studio work. These works employ both close-up and wide perspectives and multiple, grid-like screens. A Puzzle for Alice (2016) consists of 169 gridded wall panels, a master photograph and an eight-minute movie narrated by his wife, Alice, to whom it is dedicated. Subsequent films include 35 Pieces (2017) and An Art Video (2018).

== Recognition ==
Siegel has received awards and grants from the Mid Atlantic Arts Foundation (2006), New York Foundation for the Arts (2001, 1981), Gunk Foundation (2000), ArtsLink Collaborative Projects (1999), The American-Scandinavian Foundation (1996), National Endowment for the Arts (1980), and Ford Foundation (1977), among others. He has been awarded artist residencies from Grounds for Sculpture, Three Rivers Arts Festival, Abington Art Center, Art OmI, Grizedale Society (United Kingdom), and Tranekaer International Center for Art and Nature (Denmark), among others.
