= Suzanne Wright =

American artist

- Born: 1968 (age 57–58); New London, Connecticut, USA
- Education: Cooper Union (1990), Skowhegan School of Painting and Sculpture (2004), University of California – San Diego (2010)
- Known for: Feminist art

Suzanne Wright (born 1968) is an American artist and founding member of the art collective Fierce Pussy. She has worked in a variety of media, including collage, colored pencil drawings, painting, and sculpture. She describes her subject matter as "future feminism".

== Biography ==
Suzanne Wright was born in 1968 in New London, Connecticut. She earned her BFA in sculpture from Cooper Union in 1990. During her time at Cooper Union, Wright became involved with the activist group ACT UP (AIDS Coalition to Unleash Power) and the affinity group Diva TV, a lesbian video activist collective responsible for documenting many ACT UP demonstrations and activities. In 1991, she joined with other lesbians involved in ACT UP to found Fierce Pussy, an art collective addressing issues of lesbian identity. Wright's art since then has continued to explore queer and feminist themes, and she says that her "work always contained the residue of my time with Act-Up". Her artwork has been featured in numerous group shows, including the queer and feminist shows Ridykeulous (2006) and The Whitney Houston Biennial: I'm Every Woman (2014), and her drawings have been featured in the film High Art (1998) and the television show The L Word. She has taught art as an adjunct at University of California, Los Angeles, and Chapman University.

== Solo exhibitions ==
- 2014 Commonwealth and Council, Los Angeles, CA : The Rainbow Control Room
- 2012 Commonwealth and Council, Los Angeles, CA Exiting the deathstar
- 2010 Darin Klein and Friends, Artist in Residence. Los Angeles, CA.
- 2004 The Forest, Monya Rowe Gallery, New York, NY.
- 2002 Sculptures & Drawings, Church and Maple Gallery. Burlington, VT.
- 2001 New Sculptures, Stefan Stux Gallery, Project Room. New York, NY.
- 2000 In Sugarland, DeChiara-Stewart. New York, NY.
- 1999 White Room, White Columns. New York, NY.
