= I want a president =

1992 poem

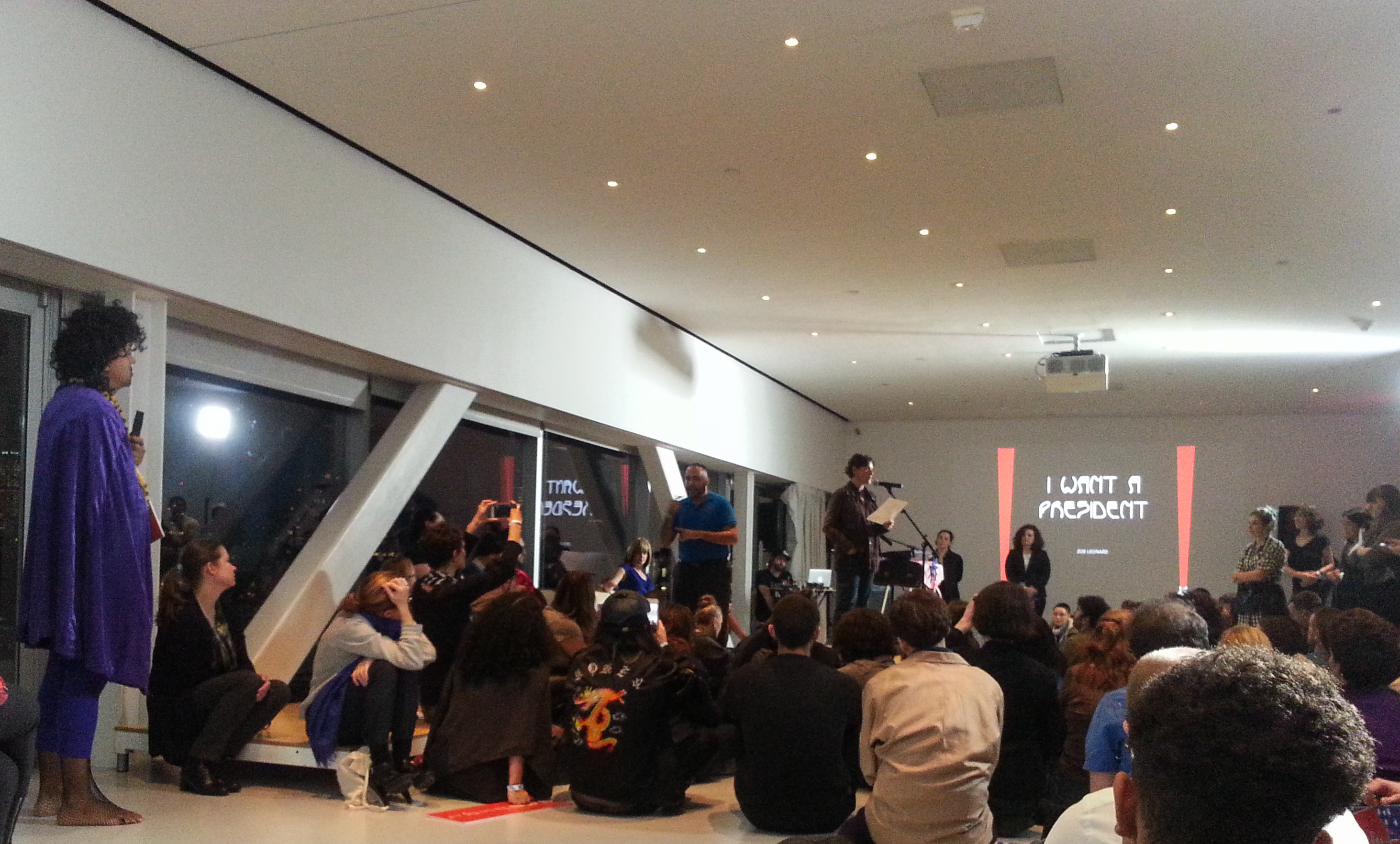
Leonard reading "I want a president" at a My Barbarian performance at the New Museum.

"I want a president" is a poem written by artist Zoe Leonard in 1992.

== Background ==
Zoe Leonard is a New York City-based artist, feminist, and activist. Outside of "I want a president", Leonard works primarily in photography and sculptures, often designed for the particular installation site. Much of her work is influenced by or a response to the AIDS epidemic of the 1980s and 1990s and associated politics.

"I want a president" was inspired by the announcement by Leonard's friend, Eileen Myles, a poet and activist who announced that they were entering the 1992 race for president of the United States as an "openly female" candidate. Myles ran as an independent against George H. W. Bush, Bill Clinton, and Ross Perot. Myles's identity stood in contrast to their wealthy male opponents; they identified at the time as a gay woman, and come from a community directly affected by both poverty and AIDS.

Leonard expresses the desire to see a more diverse range of elected officials, with struggles and experiences that most representatives today do not possess and have never had to contend with. The poem opens with the sentence, "I want a dyke for president", and continues with a series of "I want..." statements describing the kinds of people she would like to see as president.

Written in the early 1990s, "I want a president" has roots in Leonard's other work, including critiquing the political inaction of the AIDS epidemic, and from amidst a wave of anti-"political correctness" discourse.

== Publication history and reception ==
I want a dyke for president. I want a person
with aids for president and I want a fag for
vice president and I want someone with no
health insurance and I want someone who grew
up in a place where the earth is so saturated
with toxic waste that they didn't have a
choice about getting leukemia.

— Zoe Leonard, Beginning of "I want a president"

The poem was first set to be published in an LGBT magazine that then ceased publication. The document was instead photocopied and distributed. Vice described it as "something like a pre-internet meme -- something shared, copied, and re-interpreted starting way before most Americans had internet connections at home." In 2006 the art collective LTTR produced postcard versions, including them in the fifth annual art journal.

There was renewed interest in the poem in 2016, particularly after Dazed released a video of Mykki Blanco performing a reading. Paper called it a "devastating and legendary poem... an eerily poignant mirror to this current presidential election of our collective nightmares, remaining timeless nearly 25 years after it was written." Vice called the poem a "stark protest of overly-sanitized American politicians ... as relevant [in 2016] as it was when she wrote it in 1992." Out magazine reported that in 2016, "Voters are using the poem to demand politicians with lived experience reflecting that of their constituents." Leonard has said that she would not write the same poem today, but appreciates that it opens a discussion about how things have or have not changed since then. "I am interested in the space this text opens up for us to imagine and voice what we want in our leaders, and even beyond that, what we can envision for the future of our society."

In October 2016, a month before election day, High Line Art installed a large version of the poem, measuring 20 feet by 30 feet, on a pillar underneath The Standard Hotel on the High Line, in the Chelsea neighborhood of Manhattan. On 6 November, Eileen Myles, whose 1992 presidential campaign inspired the poem, gave a mock acceptance speech at the site of the installation, responding to the poem they had inspired. A number of other artists joined the event to respond to Leonard's poem, including Justin Vivian Bond, Malik Gaines and Alexandro Segade, Sharon Hayes, Pamela Sneed, and Wu Tsang.
