= Maria Lassnig Prize =

Austrian award for visual artists

The Maria Lassnig Prize is an Austrian award for visual artists established by Maria Lassnig. The Maria Lassnig Foundation in Vienna awards the Maria Lassnig Prize in collaboration with renowned exhibition venues. The prize targets artists in the middle of their careers and combines the prize money with an exhibition in an art house. The prize, awarded every two years, grants a prize money of 50,000 euros.

== Recipients ==
- 2017: Cathy Wilkes, Exhibition: MoMA PS1
- 2019: Sheela Gowda, Exhibition: Lenbachhaus
- 2021: Atta Kwami, Exhibition: Serpentine Gallery
- 2023: Lubaina Himid, Exhibition: UCCA Center for Contemporary Art, Beijing
- 2025: Carrie Yamaoka, Exhibition: Hamburger Kunsthalle
