= Fierce pussy =

American lesbian feminist art activist collective

Fierce pussy (stylised in lower case as fierce pussy) is a lesbian feminist art activist collective founded in 1991 in New York City. It is committed to art action in association with the AIDS Coalition to Unleash Power. The group uses lower case letters for their name in part because it is non-hierarchical. Fierce pussy, as a collective, speaks of themselves as a singular person, stating that "you don't need to refer to us as individual artists, all responses from our side are by fierce pussy. We are fierce pussy."

== Background ==
In 1991, a group of New York City lesbian and bisexual women formed 'fierce pussy' to address issues of queer women's identity and visibility. All of its members were involved in AIDS Coalition To Unleash Power (ACT UP) to fight the AIDS pandemic. Low-tech and low budget, the collective responded to the urgency of those years, using readily available resources: old typewriters, found photographs, their own baby pictures, and the printing supplies and equipment accessible in their day jobs.

Originally fierce pussy was composed of a fluid and often shifting cadre of lesbians including Pam Brandt, Jean Carlomusto, Donna Evans, Alison Froling, and Suzanne Wright. Other women came to an occasional meeting, and joined in to wheat paste, stencil and sticker. Since 2008, four of the original core members—Nancy Brooks Brody, Joy Episalla, Zoe Leonard, and Carrie Yamaoka—continue to work together.

One of fierce pussy's projects was the use of wheat-pasted posters and crack-and-peel stickers that were interspersed throughout New York City. Other projects included re-designing the bathroom at the Gay and Lesbian Center, a greeting card campaign, a video public service announcement, a moving billboard truck, and renaming the street signs along the New York City Gay Pride route in 1991 after prominent lesbian heroines. Since 2008, their work has appeared in various installations and exhibitions in New York City. Their site specific installation, "For The Record", was part of the exhibit Greater New York in 2015.

== Projects and exhibits ==
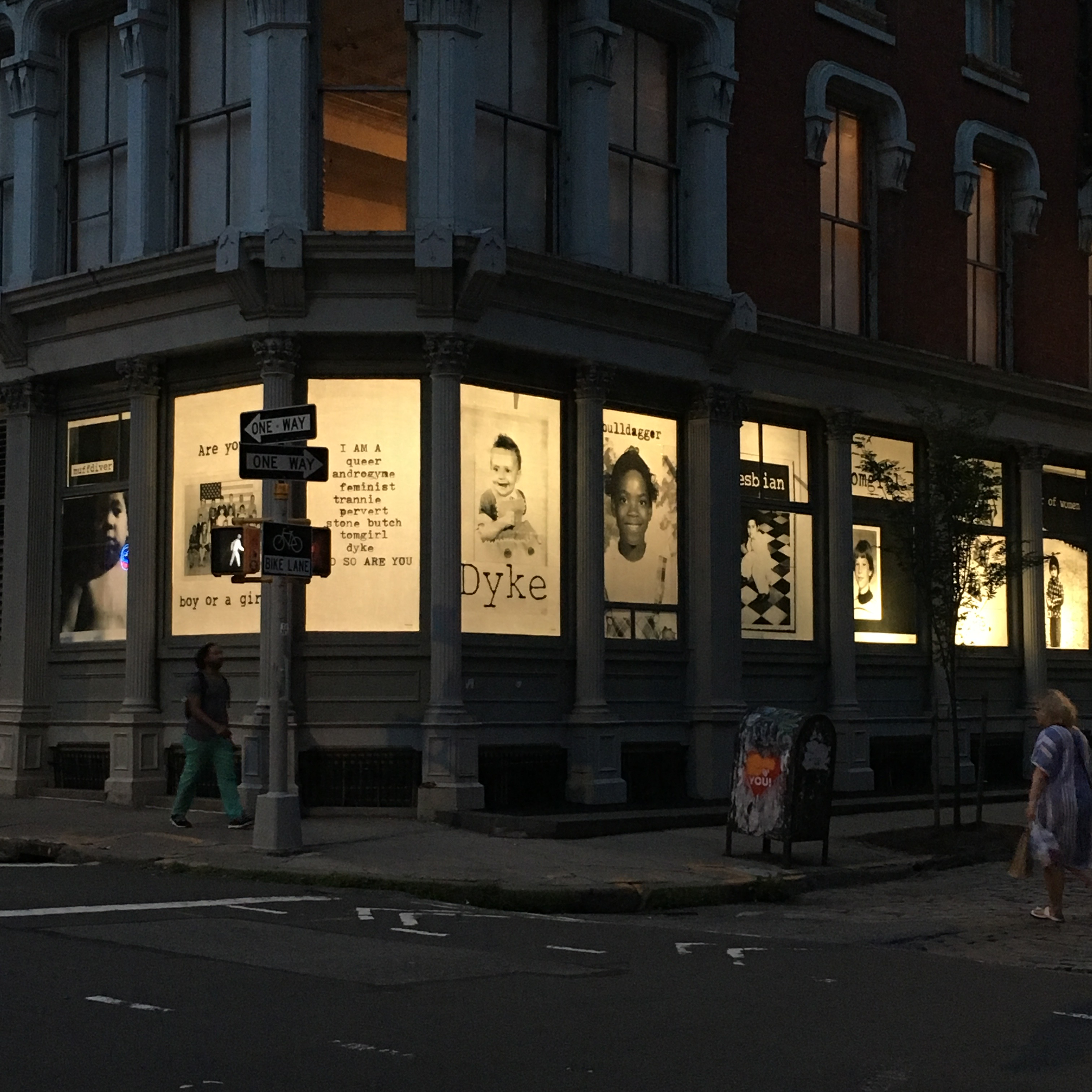
AND SO ARE YOU on view at the Leslie Lohman Museum in New York City from 2018 - 2019

While fierce pussy was most active between 1991 and 1995, their work is still exhibited as historic examples of AIDS-related art and lesbian-identified art. In 1994 the lesbian feminist art collective created the "Bathroom Project." This installation resided in a woman's bathroom in what used to be called the New York Lesbian and Gay Community Services Center (present-day Lesbian, Gay, Bisexual, & Transgender Community Center). This installation was created to add to the exhibition "Outhouses." From 2008 to 2010 at the Lesbian Herstory Archives, fierce pussy presented an overview of their old work in addition to a new installation entitled Mining the Archive, in which objects from the archive were utilized. In addition, fierce pussy contributed their display to the White Columns featured exhibit ACT UP New York: Activism, Art, and the AIDS crisis, 1987-1993. This exhibition was revived at Harvard University's Carpenter Center for the Visual Arts in 2009. When the exhibition moved to White Columns, they were commissioned to make the installation called "Get Up Everybody and Sing." In 2009, fierce pussy created an installation called "Are you a boy or girl?" A permanent installation that resides in a gender-neutral bathroom within the LGBT Community Center in New York. This work was made as a part of the "Then and Now" exhibition. In 2010, fierce pussy created "Get Up Everybody and Sing" for the White Columns presentation of the ACT UP New York exhibition; in 2015, VisualAIDS made this exhibit available under the name "For the Record". “For the Record” is a text-based series of newsprint posters, stickers, postcards, and downloadable broadsheets drawing from Gran Fury’s “Let the Record Show…”. After fierce pussy’s participation in “ACT UP New York: Activism, Art, and the AIDS Crisis, 1987–1993" in 2009, “For the Record” was created with the intention of honoring and memorializing the individuals lost during the AIDS crisis while not consigning AIDS, grief, activism and queer struggle as issues of the past. The series uses variations of the phrase "if he/she/they were here today..." repeatedly in reference to those lost to the AIDS crisis. "For the Record" was displayed in broadsheets in the windows of Printed Matter, styled as newspaper frontpages. fierce pussy has made an overview retrospective of their older work available at Printed Matter, which also published the book fierce pussy.

In 2018, fierce pussy presented a year-long, site-specific installation entitled "AND SO ARE YOU" at the Leslie Lohman Museum in New York City. The wheat-pasted installation included original poster designs from the early 1990s, and remixed and new work. Of "AND SO ARE YOU," the collective states, "Historically, public space has held a contradiction for queer people: on the one hand we have been invisible and on the other hand we are frequently the target of violence in public. Part of the impulse in making this work has been to let other queer people know that we are here, that queer people are everywhere—simply put, we make ourselves visible." In 2019, fierce pussy was awarded the PAD Award for achievement in the field of public art, presented by Public Art Dialogue, an affiliate of the College Art Association. The work was commissioned by the Leslie Lohman Museum as part of their QUEERPOWER public art program.

Posters and documentation of fierce pussy's collective work were on view in a "living archive" alongside works from the members' individual studio practices in arms ache avid aeon: Nancy Brooks Brody / Joy Episalla / Zoe Leonard / Carrie Yamaoka: fierce pussy amplified. Its first four chapters of were on view at the Beeler Gallery at Columbus College of Art & Design from fall 2018 to spring 2019. The fifth chapter was on view at the Institute for Contemporary Art (ICA) at the University of Pennsylvania in Philadelphia in the fall of 2019. The exhibit was curated by Jo-ey Tang Their work is in the International Center of Photography collection in New York City.
