= Morgan Lehman Gallery =

Art gallery in Manhattan, New York

Coordinates: 40.747852°N 74.005999°W

Morgan Lehman is a contemporary art gallery specializing in promoting the work of emerging and mid-career American artists working in a wide spectrum of creative media. Morgan Lehman promotes its own roster of artists as well as collaborating on exhibitions and projects with various creative practitioners across the globe.a. Founded by Sally Morgan (née Oberbeck) and Jay Lehman, the gallery opened in New York City in 2005. Morgan Lehman has mounted the first New York exhibition for a number of artists including Frohawk Two Feathers, Bret Slater, John Salvest, Paul Wackers, and Andrew Schoultz.

== Location ==
Morgan Lehman Gallery is located in the Chelsea art district, in Manhattan, at 526 W. 26th Street, Suite 419, New York City, New York 10001.
