= Glen Baldridge =

American contemporary artist

Glen Baldridge (born 1977) is an American contemporary artist who works in painting, printmaking, and drawing. His work is held in the collections of major American museums including the Metropolitan Museum of Art, Museum of Modern Art, and Whitney Museum of American Art.

== Early life and education ==
Baldridge was born in 1977 in Nashville, Tennessee. He received a Bachelor of Fine Arts degree in Printmaking from Rhode Island School of Design in 1999.

== Artistic work ==
Baldridge creates paintings, prints, and drawings that incorporate text phrases embedded within complex visual patterns. His work uses various techniques including paper marbling and traditional printmaking processes. Common phrases that appear in his work include "No Way" and "Wait What." His artistic practice includes the use of motion-activated cameras to capture woodland scenes, which he has incorporated into artist books titled "Animal Selfies." The Metropolitan Museum of Art describes his work "Hideaway" (2013) as being based on photographs taken with hidden motion-activated game cameras in rural New England. Baldridge has used materials including found coffin catalogues, lottery tickets, and appropriated imagery in his work. During his 2010 residency at Dieu Donné, he created series based on board games and movie posters.

== Printmaking activities ==
Baldridge co-founded Forth Estate Editions with Luther Davis, operating the print publishing company for ten years and producing over 60 editions with various artists. He has worked as artist, printer, consultant, and publisher on print editions for other artists and galleries.

== Exhibitions ==
Baldridge has exhibited at various institutions including Klaus von Nichtssagend Gallery, Halsey McKay Gallery, International Print Center, Artists Space, and EFA Project Space. His ninth solo exhibition at Klaus von Nichtssagend Gallery, titled "Wigwag," took place in 2023.

== Museum collections ==
Baldridge's work is held in the following museum collections:

- Metropolitan Museum of Art, New York
- Museum of Modern Art, New York
- Whitney Museum of American Art, New York
- New York Public Library
- Yale University Art Gallery
- RISD Museum
- Library of Congress

The Whitney Museum acquired his work "The End's Not Near, It's Here" (2009). The Museum of Modern Art acquired "Dream Burner" from the IPCNY portfolio "Pulled in Brooklyn" (2019).

== Residencies ==
Baldridge completed a Workspace Residency at Dieu Donné in 2010.
