= Cathy Wilkes =

Northern Irish artist (born 1966)

Cathy Wilkes (born 1966) is a Northern Irish artist who lives and works in Glasgow. She makes sculpture, paintings, and installations. She was the recipient of the Inaugural Maria Lassnig Prize in 2016 and was commissioned to create the British Pavilion for the 58th International Art Exhibition – La Biennale di Venezia in 2019.

== Life and work ==
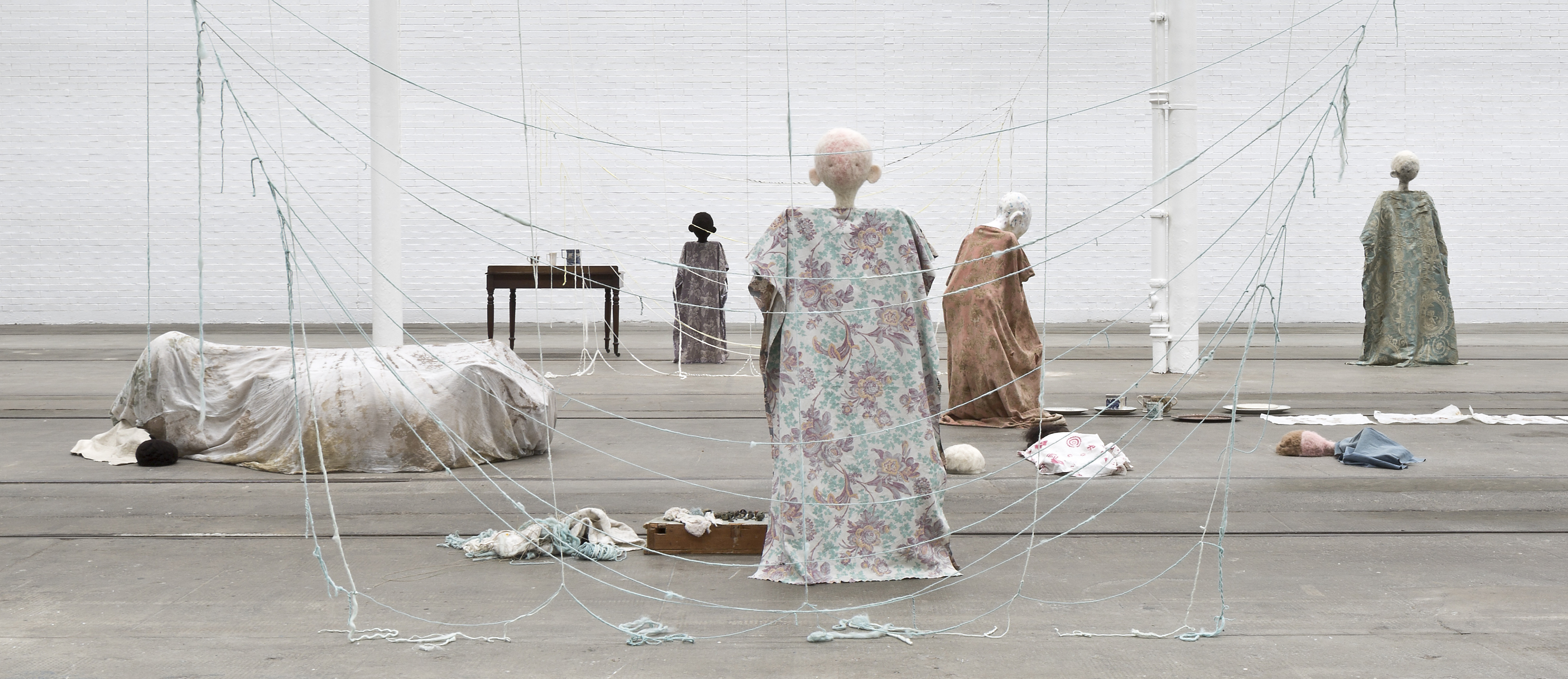
Untitled, 2014 by Wilkes

Wilkes was born in Dundonald, near Belfast. She attended Glasgow School of Art from 1985 to 1988, and subsequently completed an MFA at the University of Ulster in 1992. She lives and works in Glasgow.

Her works often feature items from daily life or items of a domestic nature, such as baking parchment, cups, plates, and biscuits.

Wilkes represented Scotland at the Venice Biennale in 2005. She also represented the United Kingdom at the 2019 event with an exhibition of interconnected series of floor-bound sculptural installations, paintings and prints curated by Hayward Gallery curator Zoé Whitley.

In 2008, Wilkes received a Turner Prize nomination in the "Sculpture, film, sound, performance" category. In 2016, Wilkes received the Inaugural Maria Lassnig Prize.
