= CRG Gallery =

American art gallery

Coordinates: 40°44′52″N 74°0′25″W

CRG Gallery was an art gallery on New York City's Lower East Side, located at 195 Chrystie St. CRG was founded in 1990 by Carla Chammas, Richard Desroche, and Glenn McMillan.

Originally CRG was located in a townhouse on the Upper East Side of Manhattan where they held the first New York solo shows for artists such as Jean-Marc Bustamante, Mona Hatoum and Jim Hodges. CRG then moved to South SoHo, Manhattan and in 2000 settled on 22nd street as its list of artists represented grew. The gallery moved to the Lower East Side in 2015. CRG hosted about six exhibitions a year. CRG closed in the summer of 2017.
