= Carrie Yamaoka =

American visual artist (born 1957)

Carrie Yamaoka (born 1957) is an interdisciplinary American visual artist of Japanese descent.

A queer artist, in the early 1990s she became a founding member of the art collective fierce pussy. In 2019, she was named a John Simon Guggenheim Fellow.

== Biography ==
Yamaoka was born in 1957 in Glen Cove, New York. She grew up in a suburb of New York City, where her family was the only family of color. Two of her grandparents immigrated to the United States from Japan in the 1800s, and another in the early 1910s.

When she was age twelve, her mother moved the family to Tokyo, where Yamaoka spent her teenage years.

=== Art and activism ===
In 1978, Yamaoka met Joy Episalla, who became her partner in both art and life.

In 1979, Yamaoka graduated with a Bachelor of Arts degree from Wesleyan University, located in Middletown, Connecticut.

Yamaoka began exhibiting her work in the 1980s after returning to New York City. Coming of age in the city during the AIDS pandemic left a significant impact on her as an artist.

In 1991, she became a founding member of the queer art collective "fierce pussy".

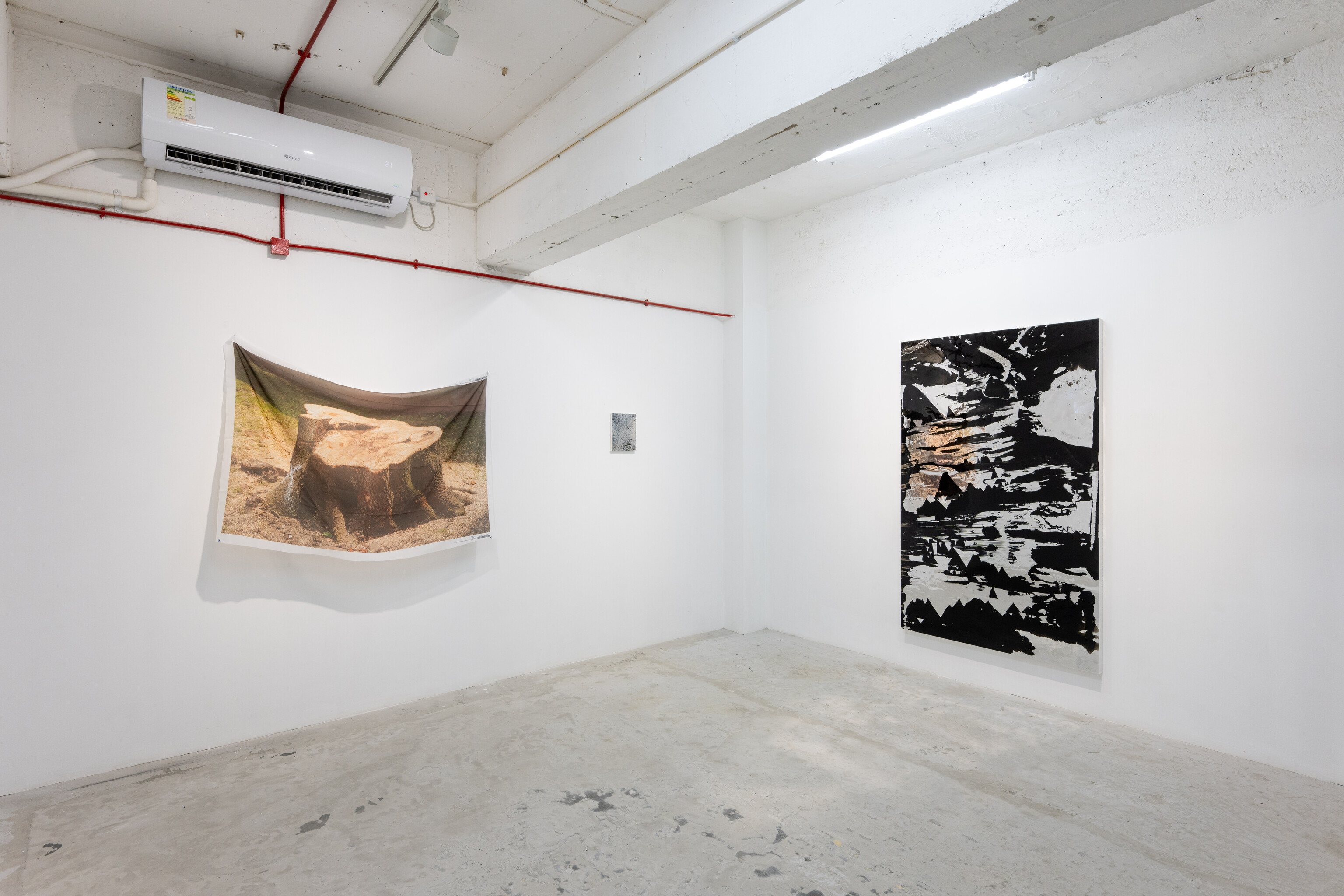
Installation view, Carrie Yamaoka 'lucid/liquid/limpid', Kiang Malingue, Hong Kong, 2024

Yamaoka's work ranges across painting, drawing, photography, and sculpture. She engages with the topography of surfaces, materiality and process, the tactility of the barely visible and the chain of planned and chance incidents that determine the outcome of the object. Her work addresses the viewer at the intersection between records of chemical action/reaction and the desire to apprehend a picture emerging in fleeting and unstable states of transformation. Her material engagement and rule-breaking strategies embrace accidents and dissolve binaries, such as improvisation/intention, methodology/intuition, and surface/depth. Toggling between visibility and invisibility, overlaying legibility and illegibility, breaking apart and recomposing, Yamaoka’s work is in a constant state of mutation.

In the 1980s and early 1990s, Yamaoka engaged directly with erasures, in text-based paintings, darkroom photographic processes, and mirror surfaces. Through recuperation of typewriter correction ribbons that registered erased words, through redaction and removal via chemical stripping, these gestures served as powerful metaphors, making visible what has been erased in our daily lives, culture, and society. Since the mid-1990s, Yamaoka has sought a direct relationship with the nature of perception, towards an open field of subjectivity as it relates to physical, social, and political bodies and their instability. She deploys a restrained formal vocabulary of mirror, reflective mylar film, resin, and their potential alchemical formations, in which poured and marred surfaces absorb, reflect, and distort their surroundings.

In 2008, the members of "fierce pussy" reunited, and continued to produce art work.

In 2019, Yamaoka had her first solo museum exhibition, recto/verso, at the Henry Art Gallery at the University of Washington in Seattle, featuring her photographic cycle Archipelagoes (2019). The work consists of a series of photograms depicting sites associated with detention, imprisonment, and displacement.

In recent years, Yamaoka’s methodology and experimentation with the materiality of time extends to revisiting dormant finished or unfinished works from her studio, by taking apart substrates and reconfiguring their constituent parts, breaking apart, peeling, and interlacing new and aged elements and processes, sometimes decades apart. The resulting works, titled as redux or revisited, bear traces of the older works, so that the past is brought into and intertwines with the present.

She lives and works in New York City.

=== Awards ===
In 1988, she received a grant from ArtMatters. In 2017, she received the Anonymous Was A Woman Award. In 2019, she was named a Guggenheim fellow in the field of fine arts. In 2025, Yamaoka was awarded the Maria Lassnig Prize.

== Permanent collections ==
Yamaoka's work is held in the permanent collections of:

- Art Institute of Chicago
- Koolpop #12 (2003), Buffalo AKG Art Museum, Buffalo, New York
- Dust. The Plates of the Present, Ensemble (2013), Centre Pompidou, Paris
- 40 by 30 (clear/black #2) (2021), Dallas Museum of Art, Dallas, Texas
- Henry Art Gallery, Seattle, Washington
- Columbus Museum of Art, Columbus, Ohio
- Sunpride Foundation, Hong Kong
- Victoria and Albert Museum, London
- Archipelagoes (2019), Whitney Museum of American Art, New York City
