= Klaus von Nichtssagend Gallery =

Art gallery in New York City

Coordinates: 40°42′59.41″N 73°59′23.55″W

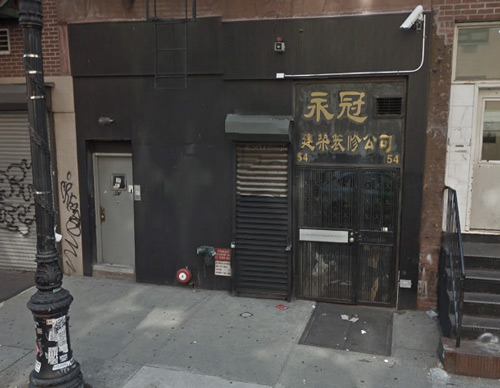
Klaus von Nichtssagend Gallery's 54 Ludlow Street space

Klaus von Nichtssagend Gallery is a contemporary art gallery at 87 Franklin Street in the Tribeca neighborhood of New York City.

The gallery was founded in 2004 by Matthew Chase, Ingrid Bromberg Kennedy, Robert Hult, and Sam Wilson. The Gallery was originally located in a storefront space at 438 Union Avenue in the Williamsburg neighborhood of Brooklyn, NY. In 2011 the gallery moved to 54 Ludlow Street in Manhattan. In 2022, the gallery relocated to its current space at 87 Franklin Street. Klaus von Nichtssagend hosts an average of nine shows each year in two gallery rooms.

From the gallery's website:

Klaus von Nichtssagend Gallery opened as an artist-run project space in Williamsburg, Brooklyn in the fall of 2004. Run by three owner/directors, Sam Wilson, Ingrid Bromberg Kennedy, and Rob Hult, the gallery initially focused on emerging artists having their first shows in New York City. After moving to Manhattan in 2011, the gallery expanded its operations, continuing to develop the careers of those artists it had nurtured early on while adding new and established artists to its roster. Today the gallery continues to center artists in its programming, hosting solo and group exhibitions throughout the year. In April 2022, the gallery relocated to a new space on Franklin Street in Tribeca.
