= Joy Episalla =

American artist

Joy Episalla (born in 1957 in Bronxville, New York) is an American visual artist known for her hybrid photographic and sculptural works.

== Education and early life ==
Episalla was born in Bronxville, and grew up in Yonkers, New York. She received a BFA degree from the California College of the Arts. Following graduation she moved to the East Village of New York City.

== Work ==
In the 1990s she became involved with AIDS activism, and worked with groups such as ACT UP, fierce pussy and The Marys. Episalla has been a member of the fierce pussy art collective from 1991 to the present. Her work has been exhibited at the Museum of Modern Art and other museums and galleries. In 2003 she received a fellowship from the Louis Comfort Tiffany Foundation.

== Collections ==
Her work is represented in the permanent collections of the Centre Pompidou, the Rose Art Museum, the Victoria and Albert Museum (with fierce pussy) among other venues.

Her oral history is held in the Smithsonian Institution Archives of American Art.

== See also ==
- Nancy Brooks Brody, artist with the fierce pussy collective
- Carrie Yamaoka, partner and artist with the fierce pussy collective
