= List of Pose characters =

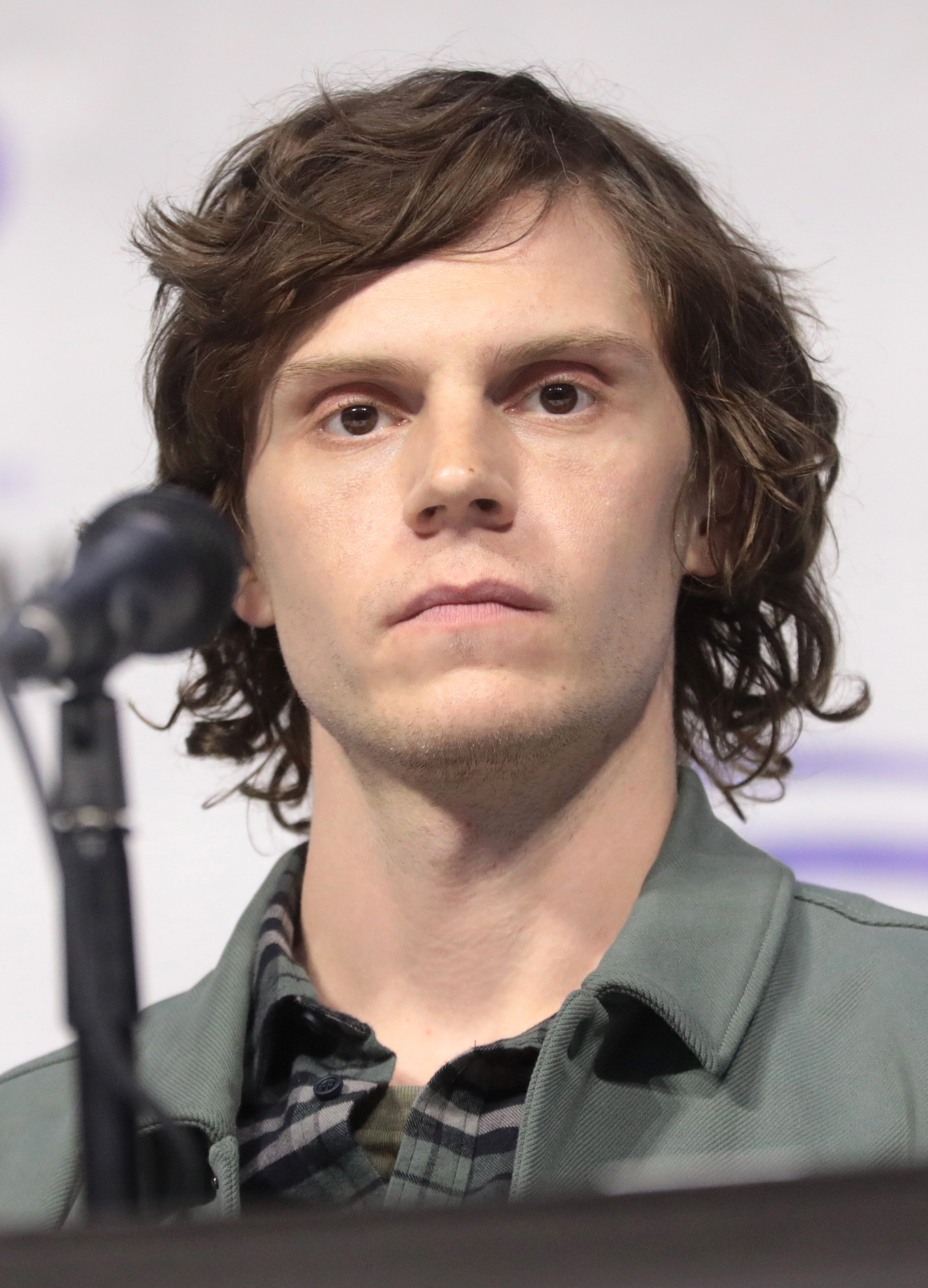
Evan Peters

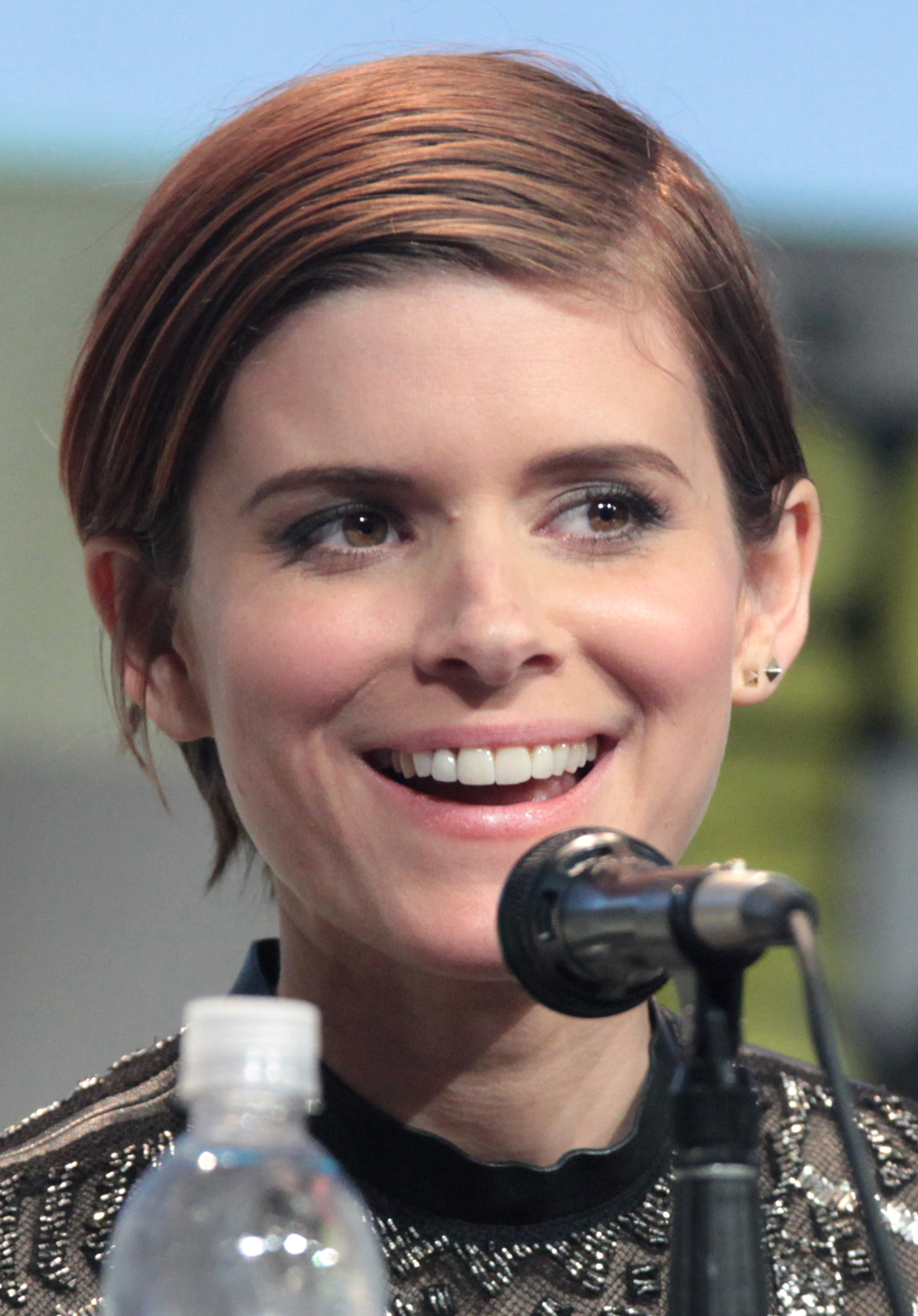
Kate Mara

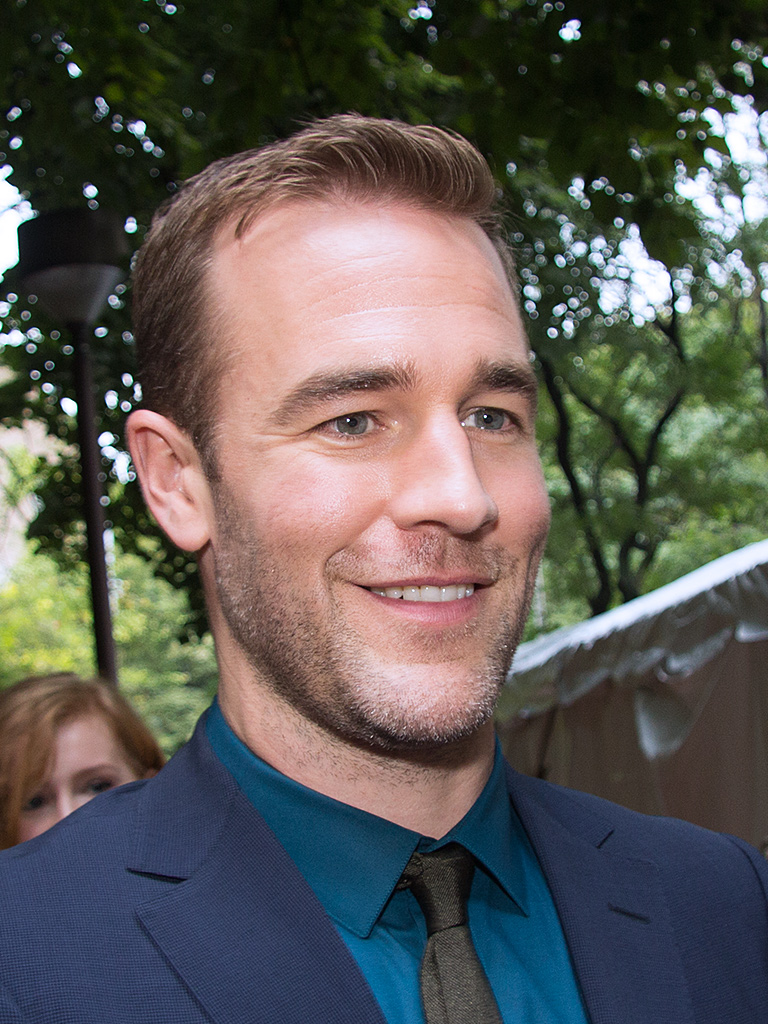
James Van Der Beek

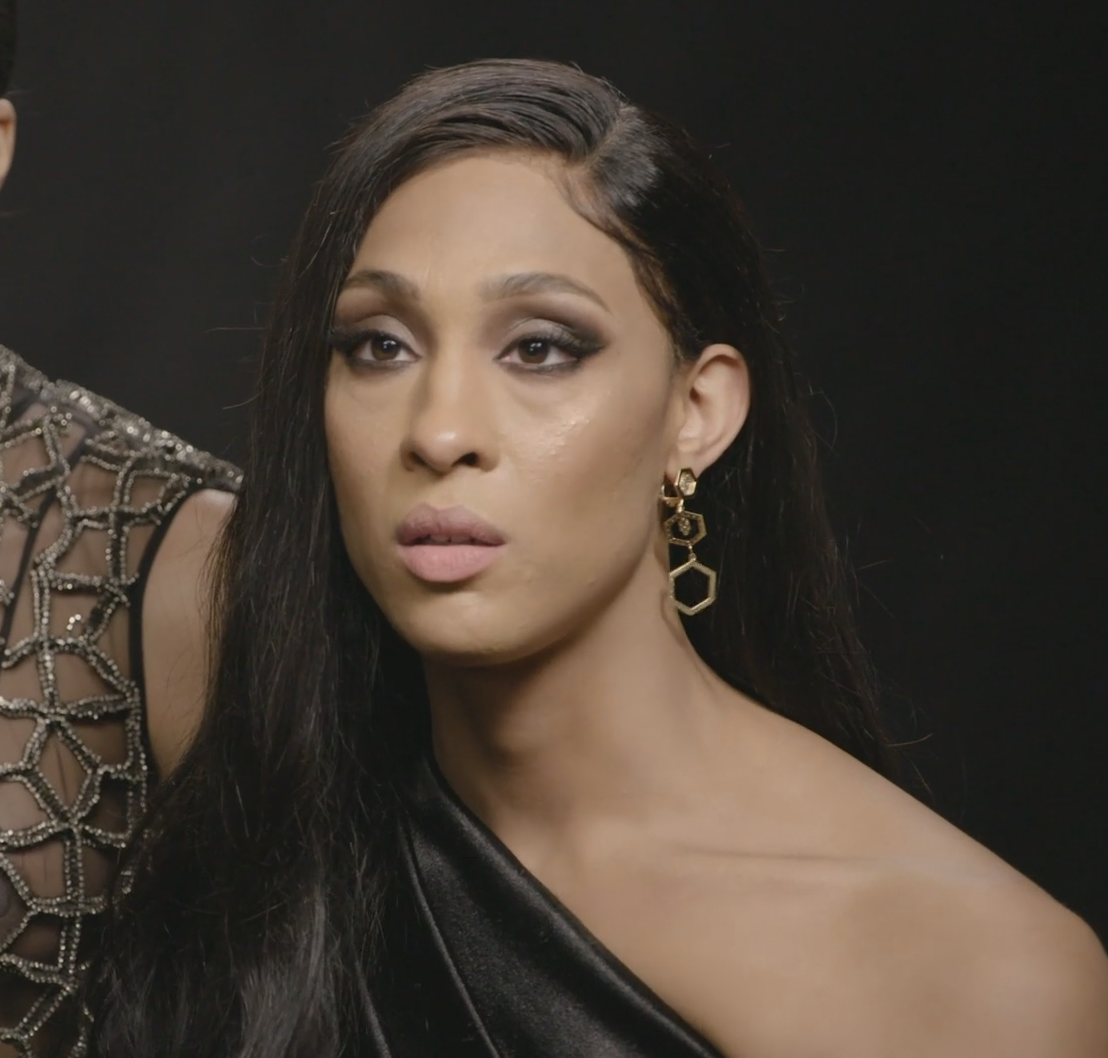
Michaela Jaé Rodriguez

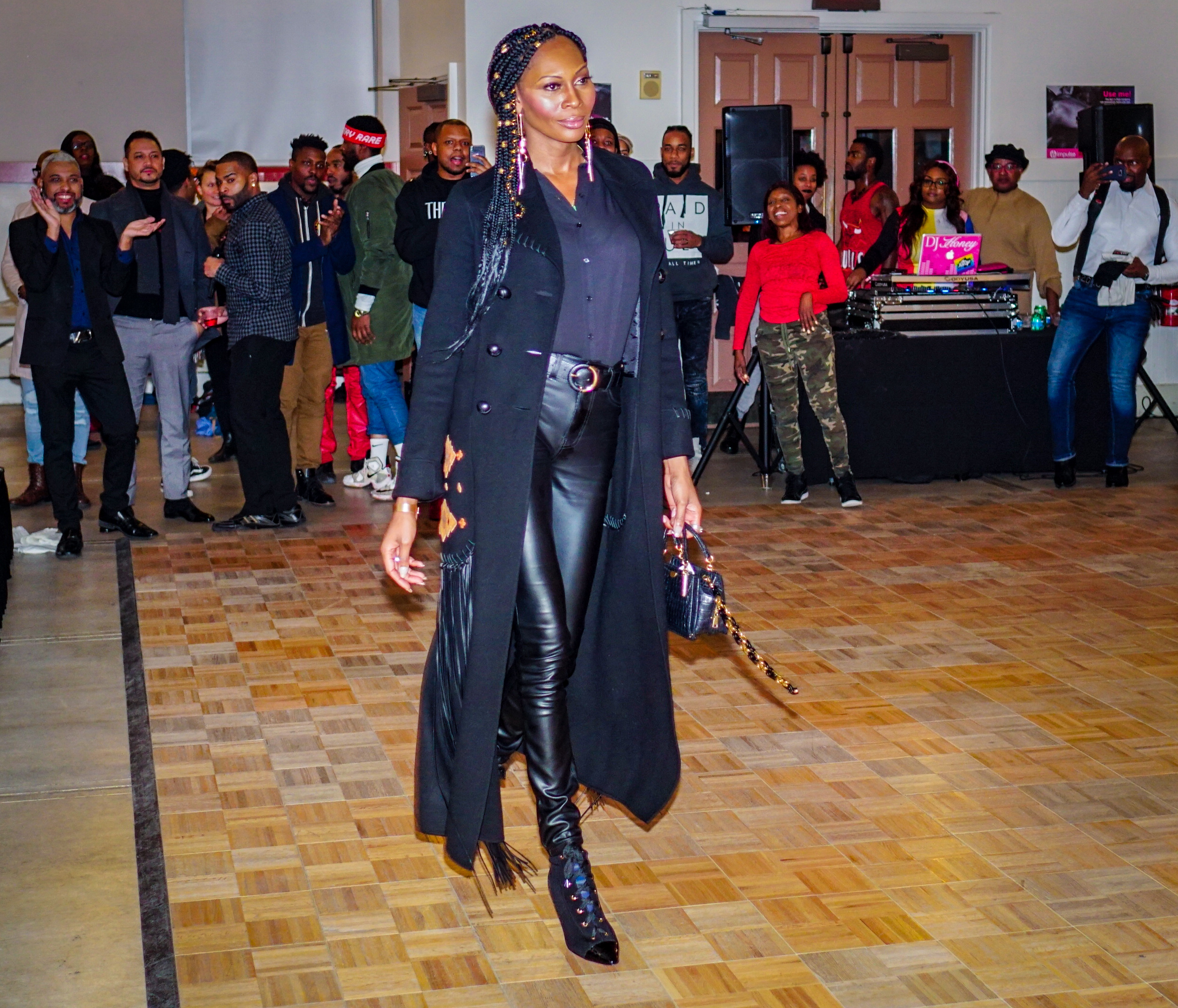
Dominique Jackson

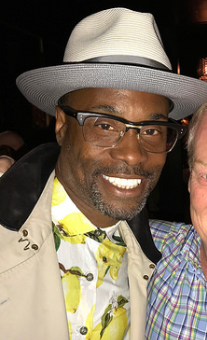
Billy Porter

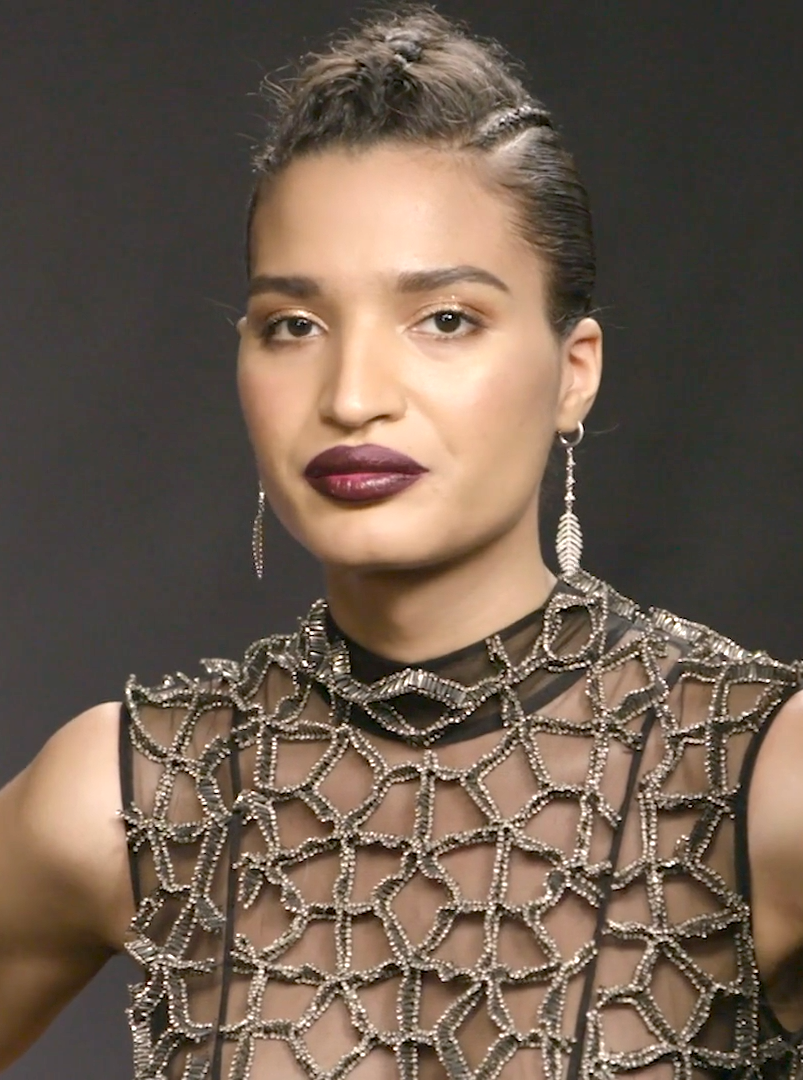
Indya Moore

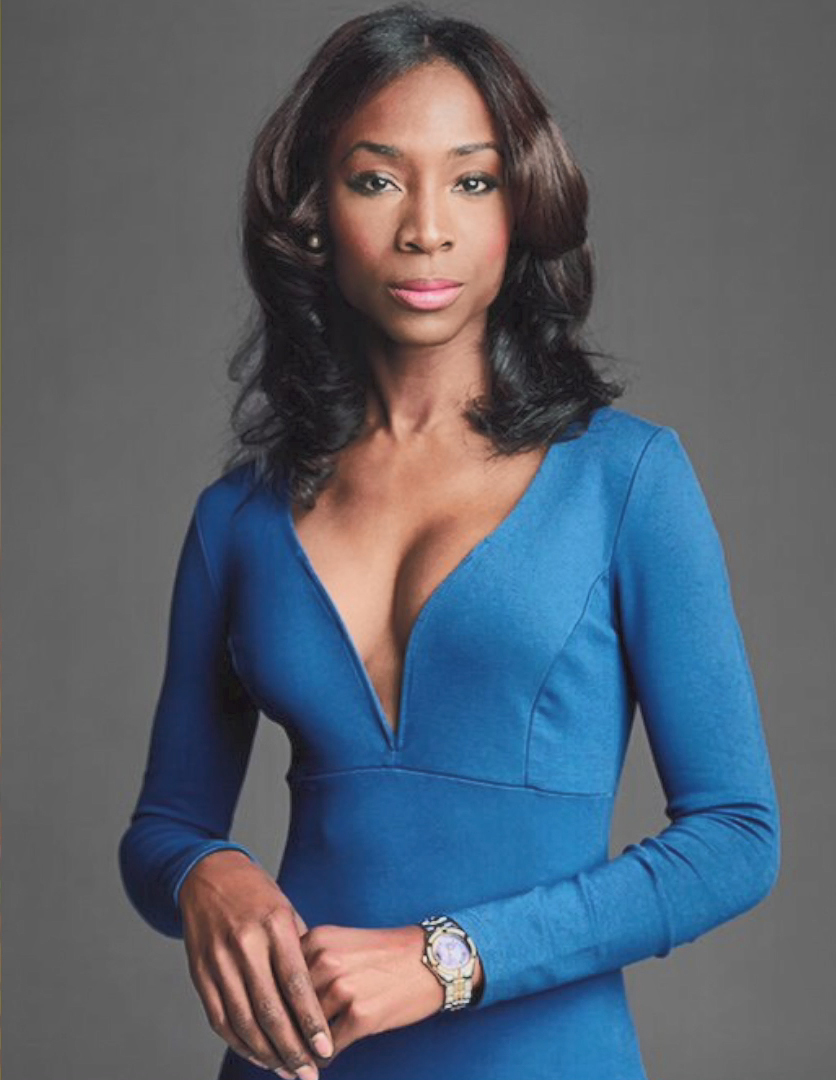
Angelica Ross

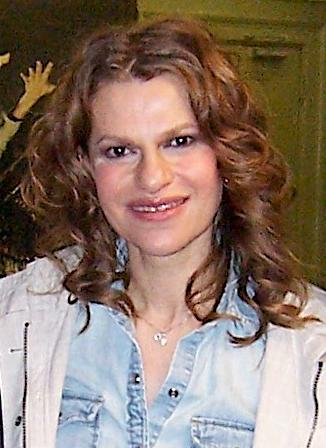
Sandra Bernhard

Peters, Mara, and Van Der Beek led the first season's billing cast, but did not appear in the second season. Rodriguez, Jackson, Porter, Moore, and Ross lead the series' central cast, while Bernhard entered the main cast in the second season after a guest appearance in the first.

Pose is an American drama television series about New York City's African-American and Latino LGBTQ and gender-nonconforming ballroom culture scene in the late 1980s and early 1990s. It features an ensemble cast, including Evan Peters, Kate Mara, James Van Der Beek, Michaela Jaé Rodriguez, Dominique Jackson, Billy Porter, Indya Moore, Ryan Jamaal Swain, Charlayne Woodard, Angelica Ross, Hailie Sahar, Angel Bismark Curiel, and Dyllón Burnside. Joining the main cast in the second season is Sandra Bernhard, following a guest appearance in the first season.

== Cast members ==
List indicator

This section includes characters who have appeared in each season.

- A green cell indicates the actor is a main cast member.
- A red cell indicates the actor is a recurring cast member.
- A light blue cell indicates the actor is a guest or special guest cast member.
- A dark gray cell indicates the actor has not participated in the respective season.

Character	Portrayed by	Appearances		
Character	Portrayed by	Season 1	Season 2	Season 3
=== Main cast ===
Stan Bowes	Evan Peters	Main		
Patty Bowes	Kate Mara	Main		
Matt Bromley	James Van Der Beek	Main		
Blanca Evangelista	Michaela Jaé Rodriguez	Main	Main	Main
Elektra Wintour	Dominique Jackson	Main	Main	Main
Pray Tell	Billy Porter	Main	Main	Main
Angel Evangelista	Indya Moore	Main	Main	Main
Damon Evangelista	Ryan Jamaal Swain	Main	Main	(Note: In season three, Ryan Jamaal Swain is credited as a series regular in On the Run (3.01); however, from the next episode onward, Swain does not appear due to Swain's sister, Raven Lynette Swain, having been shot and killed in Birmingham, Alabama on July 28, 2020, which precipitated Swain's exit from Pose.)
Helena St. Rogers	Charlayne Woodard	Main	Main	
Candy Ferocity	Angelica Ross	Main	Main	Recurring
Lulu Ferocity	Hailie Sahar	Main	Main	Main
Esteban Evangelista	Angel Bismark Curiel	Main	Main	Main
Ricky Wintour	Dyllón Burnside	Main	Main	Main
Judy Kubrak	Sandra Bernhard	Guest	Main	Main
Lemar Wintour	Jason A. Rodriguez	Recurring	Recurring	Main
=== Supporting cast ===
Cubby Wintour	Jeremy McClain	Recurring	Recurring	Recurring
Aphrodite Ferocity	Alexia Garcia	Recurring	Recurring	Recurring
Veronica Ferocity	Bianca Castro	Recurring	Recurring	Recurring
Costas Perez	Johnny Sibilly	Recurring	Guest	
Miss Orlando	Cecilia Gentili	Guest	Guest	Recurring
Florida Ferocity	Leiomy Maldonado	Guest	Recurring	Recurring
Jack Mizrahi	Jack Mizrahi	Guest	Recurring	Recurring
Frederica Norman	Patti LuPone		Recurring	
Jazmine Wintour	Damaris Lewis		Recurring	
Silhouette Wintour	Brielle Rheames		Recurring	
Shadow Wintour	Dashaun Wesley		Recurring	Recurring
Eileen Ford	Trudie Styler		Recurring	
Chi Chi	Patricia Black		Recurring	Recurring
Manhattan	André Ward		Recurring	Recurring
Castle	J. Cameron Barnet		Recurring	Recurring
Andre Taglioni	Alexander DiPersia		Recurring	
Wanda	Danielle Cooper		Recurring	Guest
Kiki Pendavis	Jonovia Chase		Recurring	Recurring
Christopher	Jeremy Pope			Recurring

== Characters ==
=== Main characters ===
==== Blanca Evangelista ====
Blanca Evangelista (portrayed by Michaela Jaé Rodriguez), an HIV-positive trans woman, the founder and mother of the House of Evangelista, and former member of the defunct House of Abundance. She opens up her own nail salon in season two, only to enter an ongoing battle against the owner of the building, Frederica Norman. After Frederica burns down the nail salon, Blanca begins doing nails in her apartment until the fumes begin to negatively affect her heath and she must quit. In the third season, she becomes a nurse aide and begins dating a man named Christopher who works in the same hospital. He encourages her to go to school and eventually become a nurse, a task she ultimately succeeds. She is able to get on the trial for new HIV/AIDS medicine and her health becomes stable.

For her performance, Rodriguez became the first transgender actress to be nominated for the Critics' Choice Television Award for Best Actress in a Drama Series and won the Golden Globe Award for Best Actress – Television Series Drama.

==== Elektra Wintour ====
Elektra Wintour Jackson (portrayed by Dominique Jackson), a trans woman, the mother of the House of Wintour, former mother of the defunct House of Abundance, and former member of the House of Evangelista and the House of Ferocity. She was born Duane Jackson. She originally gained wealth through a long term sugar daddy who eventually ended their relationship once she underwent gender confirmation surgery. Without the inflow of money, she lost her apartment and resorted to living on a park bench before Blanca took her into her home and helped get her a job as a hostess at the restaurant Indochine. In the second season, she has quit her job as a hostess and begins working as a dominatrix, making a lot of money. After a falling out with Blanca, she leaves to join the House of Ferocity, which she also leaves due to an argument between her, Lulu, and Candy. Purchasing her own apartment, she creates the new House of Wintour, named after Anna Wintour, and recruits new members including Ricky. During one of her dominatrix shifts, a client requests to do drugs during the session and pays her extra to allow it. She agrees and leaves him alone for a while, only to return to him dead from an overdose. Knowing she can't go to the cops, she pulls in Blanca and Candy. Calling up Ms. Orlando, they wrap the body up and hide it in a trunk. In season three, Elektra has moved past dominatrix work and now operates a large phone sex business, making her even richer. She is contacted by the mafia, who wish to launder money through her company, and she agrees. She then uses this wealth to pay for Angel and Papi's wedding. She then transitions her business from phone sex to running a web cam business.

==== Pray Tell ====
Pray Tell (portrayed by Billy Porter) is a gay New York City-based aspiring fashion designer and master of ceremonies, who is popular among the ball scene and acts as a mentor to the members of the community. In season one, he is informed he is HIV positive. He uses his fashion design skills to craft outfits for the House of Evangelista. He and Blanca have a close familial relationship through all three seasons, helping each other through rough patches of life. In season two, he begins a relationship with Ricky, a decision he has to defend from many people. In season three, he battles with alcoholism and the news that he doesn't have much time left. After he reconnects with his biological family and his mother in particular, he is able to gain a spot on a new drug trial for those with HIV/AIDS. His health improves greatly, and he and Blanca begin making plans until he learns that Ricky is starting to show signs of worsening health due to AIDS. Lying to Ricky that he can get more medication, he gives him his pills and ends up dying from AIDS. His words and wisdom are used by Blanca to inspire others as he watches over her.

For his performance, Porter won a Primetime Emmy Award, a Golden Globe Award, and a Critics' Choice Television Award for Best Lead Actor in a Drama Series.

==== Angel Evangelista ====
Angel Evangelista (portrayed by Indya Moore) is a trans model and former sex worker who joins the House of Evangelista after leaving the House of Abundance. In the first season, she worked at the piers as a prostitute, where she met Stan Bowes. They begin a romantic affair even though Stan is married and she begins working at a peep show which pays more and is safer. Eventually, Stan rents her a luxury apartment with the extra money he gets from work. After he does not show up to spend Christmas night with her but with his family, she leaves and returns to the House of Evangelista. Stan's wife Patty eventually learns of the affair and seeks her out, tracking her down to a ball. They talk in a diner, and Patty learns that Angel is trans. Stan eventually returns to her and asks to go with her to a ball so he can learn about her world. She takes him to one but he grows overwhelmed and leaves. After a conversation with Blanca, Angel cuts off the affair with Stan, telling him that the House of Evangelista is her family and she needs to be there for them. In season two, she is back working at the piers for a little while before Blanca comes and encourages her to try out for a modeling competition. She meets Ms. Ford, a judge of the competition, who likes Angel but requires professional photos and helps arrange for them to be taken by a man named Andre Taglioni. After meeting with Andre, he informs Angel that he's familiar with her from her sex work at the pier and she admits she would not be able to pay for a complete set, offering to settle an arrangement. They take the pictures, but when only he and Angel are left, he orders her to undress and takes pictures of her. At the next ball, she is visibly distressed and informs Papi and Blanca about what happened. The three go to Andre, and Papi beats him up while Blanca retrieves the pictures. Angel gives her professional photos to Ms. Ford and advances far into the competition. She does not win the competition, but Ms. Ford helps her gain modeling contracts. During this time she forms a romance with Papi. After being invited to a club that is graced by models, artists, and photographers, they are both coaxed into doing cocaine. Angel becomes addicted and it starts to impede her reliability as a model. Damon reveals this to Blanca, but she is hesitant to kick Angel out due to Angel being like a daughter to her. Angel eventually sits Blanca down, takes responsibility for her addiction, moves out with Papi and quits using cocaine. During one of her photoshoots for a company, a member of the ballroom scene clocks Angel as trans and informs some of the other workers there. Word spreads and Angel's contracts start getting pulled. She goes home and drinks heavily until Papi finds her. He resolves to open up his own modeling agency specifically for trans women, and he and Angel get engaged. Towards the end of the season, he secures her a modeling job in Germany and they fly off to it. In season three, it has been a little while since Angel's last modeling gig and she begins to start smoking cocaine again. After an intervention from her loved ones, she quits. She and Papi begin planning for the wedding and Elektra agrees to pay for it. Papi learns he has a son who was born before he got together with Angel, and Angel walks out, believing she is not ready to be a mother. After receiving advice from Blanca and paying a visit to her estranged father, Angel returns to Papi and agrees to help him raise his son as theirs. They have a beautiful wedding attended by many members. Afterward, they go on a honeymoon with Papi's son, Beto, to Disney World and play on the beach. She eventually returns to New York as a successful model, stepmother, and wife.

==== Esteban Evangelista ====
Esteban "Lil Papi" Martinez-Evangelista (portrayed by Angel Bismark Curiel) is a member of the House of Evangelista and Husband to Angel. He first appeared in season one where he quickly joined the newly formed House of Evangelista after seeing them perform as a house for the first time and not wanting to continue being homeless. He ends up breaking Blanca's rule against selling drugs when he is caught by Damon and later ratted out by Ricky who doesn't want to jeopardize his place in Blanca's house. After he is kicked out by Blanca he falls into more drug selling, and is arrested and then released. The drug dealers can't have him work for them for a while since he was just recently busted. This prompts him to join the newly created House of Ferocity, led by co-mothers Lulu and Candy. However they end up treating him like a servant instead of a house member and continually berate him. In the season one finale, he leaves the House of Ferocity after Blanca agrees to take him back. In season two, he begins to let his inner feelings for Angel show and they start flirting. Papi and Blanca accompany Angel to her modeling competition audition and celebrate when she gets in. When Angel later informs him and Blanca that the photographer took nude pictures of her, they go to his house and Papi beats him up while Blanca retrieves the pictures. Angel sadly doesn't win the competition but Ms. Ford still is able to land her modeling jobs. During a walk in the park Papi reassures her and they kiss for the first time.

==== Damon Evangelista ====
Damon Richards-Evangelista (portrayed by Ryan Jamaal Swain) is a talented dancer who becomes the first member of the House of Evangelista. Blanca finds him in the streets of New York City after his parents disowned and kicked him out upon learning of his sexuality. He grows as a dancer, joining a dance school under Blanca's urging and insistence. He proves to be one of the schools best dancers and begins a relationship with Ricky. In season two, after the explosion of Madonna's song Vogue, Damon begins teaching voguing classes at the YMCA for money. After being confronted by a man at one of the balls who claims to have slept with Ricky, they get into an argument and later break up. He is soon approached by a recruiter who wants him to try out to be a dancer for Madonna's tour. He and Ricky attend the auditions and make it near the end but neither get the spot. They are then given dancing spots on the TV show Solid Gold and agree to be friends. Blanca then tasks him, Lulu, and Ricky with finding a way to inflate a giant condom in front of Frederica Norman's house. He is later able to score a dancing spot on a Malcolm McLaren tour, going to Europe and promising to establish a House of Evangelista in Paris. Eventually he returns home when he hears about how sick Blanca is. Eventually Damon falls into alcoholism and is forced to move to a family member's house down south to help his recovery. In 1998 he writes a letter to Blanca to inform her that he is keeping sober, has moved to Chicago, is dating a new man who owns three dance studios, and that he teaches there now.

==== Helena St. Rogers ====
Helena St. Rogers (portrayed by Charlayne Woodard) is a professional dancer and the dean of a dance school that welcomes Damon. While she doesn't understand ball culture and is initially concerned that the balls are a distraction for Damon, she cares deeply for him, and forms a friendship with Blanca.

==== Candy Ferocity ====
Candy Johnson-Ferocity (portrayed by Angelica Ross) was a trans woman, the co-founder of the House of Ferocity.

Initially a member of the House of Abundance, Candy leaves along with Lulu, after the house suffers from financial failings, and form the House of Ferocity. Candy continually argued and fought against the judgements and ridicule of Pray Tell and the other ballroom judges, even risking silicone injections from shady plastic surgeon, Ms. Orlando, in order to be perceived as more attractive. When Candy and Lulu struggle to maintain their house, Candy takes jobs in the sex trade. One night while working in a sleazy motel, Candy is murdered by one of her clients. At her funeral, she appears to various characters through spirit; she forgives Pray Tell for his previous judgemental attitude towards her, and expresses support for Angel and Lulu. Her parents, Darnell and Vivica, attend the funeral service and, despite spending most of their lives estranged from Candy, they finally accept her for who she is. Lulu, however, becomes distant during the service and comes to a realisation that she is unable to remember anything positive about her co-mother and angrily strips items of clothing from Candy's body before being pulled away by Damon, Papi and Ricky. She leaves the funeral home in tears and is visited by Candy's spirit who comforts her. After this she visits Pray Tell to try and convince him to end his suffering and join her in the afterlife, and then appears briefly in the car when the other girls are returning from a trip to the beach. She is last seen vising Angel as a ghost during her bachelorette gathering to wish her marriage well and express how meaningful and important it is to their community.

After being cast in American Horror Story's ninth season, Ross became the first transgender actress to have roles in the starring casts of two television series.

==== Lulu Ferocity ====
Lulu Ferocity (portrayed by Hailie Sahar) is a trans woman, former member of the House of Abundance, and the co-founder of the House of Ferocity. Like many of the other major female characters, she is a veteran of the House of Abundance, where she was Elektra's second-in-command. Between her and Candy, Lulu has a chilled disposition and doesn't express her feelings too much. During season one, after Elektra loses her long term sugar daddy and the wealth he gave her, Lulu and Candy leave the House of Abundance and create their own House with Lulu coming up with the name Ferocity. They enlist other girls to join and even poach Papi, Lamar, and Cubby but Lulu and Candy's treatment of Papi and a sickening read from Elektra causes the three to leave and join the House of Evangelista. In season two, after Elektra leaves the House of Evangelista, she joins the House of Ferocity and uses her skills to help them win some trophies but after a fight leaves them as well. Being a house mother is expensive and Candy starts hooking to make extra money. This ends with her being murdered in a hotel room, leaving Lulu the sole Mother of the House of Ferocity. Lulu and Angel eventually fall into drug use but with support from her friends Lulu gets help and starts breaking her addiction. In 1998 it is shown that Lulu has really turned her life around and is now working as an accountant.

==== Ricky Wintour ====
Ricky Wintour (portrayed by Dyllón Burnside) is an aspiring dancer, former member of the House of Evangelista and the House of Wintour, and the current Father of the House of Evangelista. In season one, he romantically pursued Damon and after walking a category at the ball and scoring high, Ricky petitions Blanca to let him join the House of Evangelista. She agrees and he moves into their apartment. He later rats out Papi to Blanca for selling drugs, reasoning that before the House of Evangelista he was homeless and he wouldn't do anything to put that in jeopardy. He auditions for the Al B. Sure! tour and gains a spot as a dancer. He parts from Damon and during the tour cheats on him with another dancer named Chris. This causes drama when Chris turns up at the ball and taunts Damon. Ricky denies it but it causes a rift in their relationship, especially since he and Damon had unprotected sex after he got back from tour. They both get tested and their results come back negative, but Damon still decides to break up with him. Ricky moves out of the Evangelista apartment and joins the recently created House of Wintour. He also begins casually hooking up with Chris but breaks it off, realizing he wants Damon. Ricky gets scouted as a possible dancer for Madonna's Blonde Ambitions tour along with Damon and both make it to the end but neither get it. The talent scout then points them at auditions for Solid Gold. Later Chris calls Ricky, telling him he's tested positive for HIV. Pray Tell convinces Ricky to get tested again and his test reveals he is now also positive. Ricky and Pray Tell begin a relationship with each other, which brings drama and arguments from Blanca, Elektra, and Damon. But through it all they stay strong with Ricky eventually helping Pray Tell get in touch with his feminine side and not run from it. In season three, Ricky's HIV becomes worse and he starts finding lesions on his body. Pray Tell, in an effort to save Ricky's life, starts giving his meds to Ricky while lying and saying he can get more for himself. Ricky's health improves but Pray Tell ends up passing away without the medication. By the year 1998 Ricky is still healthy and has taken over as the Father of the House of Evangelista, watching over a new group of house members.

==== Judy Kubrak ====
Judy Kubrak (portrayed by Sandra Bernhard) is a nurse who treats HIV-positive people and an activist, member of ACT UP. She works at the Roosevelt Hospital and is first seen treating Pray Tell's HIV-positive long-time boyfriend Costas Perez, who by then was in an advanced stage of the disease. In the second season, Judy becomes an ally to the ballroom community and is revealed to be a lesbian. Alongside Pray Tell, she organizes cabarets to cheer up the HIV patients and alleviate their suffering. She also helps Pray Tell and Blanca to get Candy's body after she is murdered. In season three she moves from the HIV/AIDS ward to the maternity ward, saying she is tired of being around death and is brought joy by all the new life.

After having a single guest appearance in the first season, Bernhard was promoted to the series' main cast for the second season onward.

==== Stan Bowes ====
Stan Bowes (portrayed by Evan Peters) is an ordinary New Jersey citizen who lands a job at Trump Tower in New York City to help his household, consisting of wife Patty and two children. He begins an affair with sex worker Angel Evangelista after meeting her in the Chelsea Piers; they quickly fall in love with each other. Stan is hired to work alongside Matt and eventually requests a salary raise to afford an apartment for Angel. Their relationship grows as Patty starts suspecting, leading to him leaving Angel alone in Christmas, though he had promised her he would be available for her during one hour. By getting a promotion, Stan starts a rivalry with Matt, who is aware of Stan's affair and tells Patty about it. Patty then visits Angel and is stunned upon learning that Angel is a trans woman. Patty confronts Stan, and they start visiting couples therapy; in a session, she tells him that she wants some time apart and kicks Stan out of their house. In retaliation, Stan physically confronts Matt at the office, in which Matt comes out on top. Afterwards, Stan and Angel begin living together as a couple; however, their relationship falls apart when she takes him to a ball, and he gets overwhelmed by the atmosphere and culture, realizing that he did not belong there and leaving Angel. At the end of the first season, Stan shows up outside the ballroom and begs Angel to accept him back, promising to "rescue" her from the balls, but she rejects him.

Despite having a major role in the first season, the character does not appear in the second or third season.

==== Patty Bowes ====
Patty Bowes (portrayed by Kate Mara) is Stan's wife, who stays at home and takes care of their children while he goes to work. She finds about Stan's affair through Matt and decides to pay a visit to Angel, eventually learning that she is a trans woman. She then confronts Stan and kicks him out of their house, despite having visited couples therapy.

Despite appearing in the main cast of the first season, the character does not appear in the second or third season.

==== Matt Bromley ====
Matt Bromley (portrayed by James Van Der Beek) is an employee at Trump Tower, who interviews Stan for a job. Due to their similar upbringing, Matt and Stan quickly befriend, but their friendship turns into rivalry when Stan is promoted to a higher position within their workplace. In revenge, Matt tells Patty about Stan's affair with Angel, leading to a physical fight between the two men.

Despite appearing in the main cast of the first season, the character does not appear in the second or third season.

=== Supporting characters ===
==== Introduced in the first season ====
- Lemar Wintour (portrayed by Jason A. Rodriguez) is the founder and current father of the House of Khan, a new house that seeks to monetize what's left of the ballroom scene, and former member of the Houses of Abundance, Ferocity, Wintour, and Evangelista.
- Cubby Wintour (portrayed by Jeremy McClain) is a member of the House of Wintour, and former member of the Houses of Abundance, Ferocity, and Evangelista. He passes away from AIDS in the third season and appears briefly as a ghost before Angel and Papi's wedding.
- Aphrodite Ferocity (portrayed by Alexia Garcia) is a member of the House of Ferocity, and former member of the House of Xtravaganza.
- Veronica Ferocity (portrayed by Bianca Castro) is a thrift store cashier and a member of the House of Ferocity.
- Tess Wintour (portrayed by Trace Lysette) is a clothing store saleswoman who joins the House of Wintour.

==== Introduced in the second season ====
- Frederica Norman (portrayed by Patti LuPone) is a shady real estate mogul who rents one of her properties to Blanca but attempts to kick her out upon learning that Blanca is a trans woman. When Blanca refuses, Frederica's son boards up Blanca's nail salon. In revenge, Blanca and the rest of the community protest outside the boarded up building as well as inflating a large condom around Frederica's house. Afterwards, Blanca is informed that her nail salon has burned down and Frederica hints that she was behind it. Eventually, it is revealed that a witness had seen Norman leaving the salon moments before it was set alight and as a result she had been arrested on suspicion of arson and could be facing up to ten years in prison. While in prison, Frederica states to one of her visitors that she regrets ruining Blanca's dream. LuPone joined Pose's cast in March 2019.
- Eileen Ford (portrayed by Trudie Styler) is a fashion model agent who opens doors to Angel's modeling career. Although initially not accepting Angel's homemade photos, she recommends Angel a photographer to go and get professional images taken with. She also conducts another interview with Angel whose "sassiness" makes her lose the job; however, Ford presents her with an opportunity after a model dropped out during a photoshoot. When it is revealed that Angel is transgender, she is dropped by multiple brands, but with the help of Papi, Ford agrees to continue working with Angel.
- Silhouette Wintour (portrayed by Brielle Rheames) is a member of the House of Wintour.
- Shadow Wintour (portrayed by Dashaun Wesley) is a member of the House of Wintour.
- Jazmine Wintour (portrayed by Damaris Lewis) is a member of the House of Wintour.
- Chi Chi (portrayed by Patricia Black) is one of Elektra's co-workers.

==== Introduced in season 3 ====
Jeremy Pope as Christopher, Blanca's caring boyfriend.

=== Minor characters ===
- Costas Perez (portrayed by Johnny Sibilly) is Pray Tell's boyfriend and an AIDS patient under Judy's care at the Roosevelt Hospital. He passes away in season one.
- Amanda Bowes (portrayed by Samantha Grace Blumm) is Stan and Patty's daughter.
- Pito (portrayed by Sebastian Chacon) is an acquaintance of Damon.
- Dick Ford (portrayed by Christopher Meloni) is Elektra's wealthy former lover and financier.
- Ms. Orlando (portrayed by Cecilia Gentili) is a shady plastic surgeon. In season one she gives Candy back alley silicone injections. She is enlisted in season two to help Elektra hide a dead body.
- Dr. Gottfried (portrayed by Kathryn Erbe) is Elektra's doctor, who aids in her transition.
- Gina Mugler (portrayed by Rose Chanel) is the mother of the House of Mugler and nominee for Mother of the Year.
- Florida Ferocity (portrayed by Leiomy Maldonado) is a member of the House of Ferocity.
- Kiki Pendavis (portrayed by Jonovia Chase) is the mother of the House of Pendavis.
- Wanda (portrayed by Danielle Cooper) is an ACT UP activist and a friend of Judy Kubrak.
- Andre Taglioni (portrayed by Alexander DiPersia) is a famed photographer and fetishistic predator who takes naked pictures of Angel. He is then beat up by Papi while Angel and Blanca retrieve the pictures.
- Manhattan (portrayed by André Ward) is a member of the Masters of Ceremony Council.
- Castle (portrayed by J. Cameron Barnet) is a member of the Masters of Ceremony Council.
- Jonas Norman (portrayed by Edward Carnevale) is Frederica's son.
- Chris (portrayed by Blaine Alden Krauss) is Ricky's former lover.

Jose Gutierez Xtravaganza, Sol Williams Pendavis, and Jack Mizrahi also appear as themselves.
