= Pilot (Pose) =

- Pose episode
- Episode no.: Season 1 Episode 1
- Directed by: Ryan Murphy
- Written by: Ryan Murphy; Brad Falchuk; Steven Canals
- Original air date: June 3, 2018
- Running time: 77 minutes

Guest appearances
- Clark Jackson as Lawrence Richards; Roslyn Ruff as Mrs. Richards

Episode chronology
| ← Previous — | Next → "Access" |

"Pilot" is the first episode of the American drama television series Pose, which aired on FX on June 3, 2018. The 77-minute episode was written by series creators Ryan Murphy, Brad Falchuk and Steven Canals, and directed by Murphy.

== Plot ==
The children of the House of Abundance prepare for an upcoming ball event. After rejecting Angel's (Indya Moore) proposal, Elektra (Dominique Jackson) takes Blanca's (Mj Rodriguez) idea for her own. Abundance hides in a museum and steals wardrobe pieces from exhibits after closing time. They must shatter a glass door to escape and a security alarm is set off. They dash to the ball with the police on their tail.

Pray Tell (Billy Porter), an emcee, announces to the floor that the category is “royalty”. The House of Abundance walk together bearing the stolen clothing and achieve victory. Elektra and her children willingly accept handcuffs after the police arrive soon thereafter.

The next day, Damon Richards (Ryan Jamaal Swain) attends his dance class, returns home, and retreats to his bedroom. He plays a cassette in his stereo and begins to dance but is abruptly interrupted by the arrival of his father Lawrence (Clark Jackson). Lawrence turns the music off and begins questioning him about his whereabouts. He presents a gay magazine to Damon from underneath Damon's bed. Damon confesses that he attends dance classes and that he is gay. His father whips him with a belt. Damon's mother (Roslyn Ruff) hurries into the house and attempts to stop her husband. Damon is thrown onto the lawn. His mother stands before him and disowns him.

Blanca stumbles across Damon dancing in Washington Square Park and invites him to join the House of Evangelista. After introducing him to the world of ball culture, Blanca enlists Damon to walk in Evangelista's first ball. Blanca recruits Angel as well. Evangelista is crushingly defeated by Abundance; however, they acquire a new member, a Puerto Rican named Lil Papi (Angel Bismark Curiel).

Angel is picked up by a man recently employed by Trump Tower named Stan (Evan Peters). Stan rents a motel room but the two do not have sex. They instead kiss and discuss her hopes and dreams. Angel aspires to be treated just like a “real woman”. Stan's boss, Matt Bromley (James Van Der Beek) suspects that he has a mistress and slyly acknowledges this to him.

Stan takes his wife Patty (Kate Mara) to the Rainbow Room for their anniversary. They talk about Patty fulfilling her dream of eating lobster. Stan asks her if the fantasy is better than the reality. She asserts that she likes reality best.

Blanca confronts Helena St. Rodgers (Charlayne Woodard), a modern dance teacher at the New School for Dance, after Damon misses the deadline to apply. Helena allows Damon to audition and Damon delivers an impromptu performance set to “I Wanna Dance with Somebody (Who Loves Me)”. Afterwards, Helena hugs Damon and admits him to the school.

Stan picks Angel up on the street once again and they drive off into the night together.

== Production ==
In November 2017, the pilot was ordered and shot in New York City.

== Reception ==
=== Ratings ===
In its original American broadcast, "Pilot" was seen by an estimated 688,000 viewers and gained a 0.2 ratings share among adults aged 18–49, according to Nielsen Media Research. “Pilot” garnered 444,000 viewers and a 0.2 ratings share in live +3 ratings for a combined 1.132 million viewers and a 0.4 ratings share.

=== Reviews ===
USA Today described the pilot episode as "user-friendly". Kayla Kumari Upadhyaya from The A.V. Club gave The Pilot an A, saying "Pose crucially acknowledges its characters’ trauma without making it the sole focus, without becoming indulgent trauma porn."

The Writers Guild Foundation listed the script as one of the best in 2010s film and television.
