= Jason A. Rodriguez =

Dominican-American actor and dancer (born 1990)

- Born: New York City, U.S.
- Education: SUNY Purchase
- Occupations: Actor; dancer
- Years active: 2012–present

Jason A. Rodriguez is a Dominican-American actor and dancer. He is known for his role of Lemar Wintour in the FX television series Pose. He is also known as Slim Xtravaganza and belongs to the House of Xtravaganza, part of the New York City ballroom scene.

== Early life ==
Rodriguez was born and raised in Washington Heights, Manhattan in New York City.

== Career ==
=== Early work ===
Rodriguez graduated from SUNY Purchase in 2012. He received a BA in Arts Management while studying dance. There he mentored under Associate Professor Kevin Wynn, who helped him improve his technique. It was while managing Wynn's email that Rodriguez learned of auditions for Pose. Kevin Wynn introduced Rodriguez to dance networks by employing his assistance at Joffrey Ballet School and Alvin Ailey American Dance Theater.

Rodriguez was inspired to get involved with ballroom culture after seeing Paris is Burning. Rodriguez began training with Benny Ninja from the House of Ninja in 2010. He then joined the House of Ninja, and trained with Javier Ninja, before eventually joining the House of Xtravaganza and training with Derrick Xtravaganza.

=== TV and film ===
Rodriguez was cast in Baz Luhrmann’s Netflix series The Get Down in 2016 as a voguer. He was also cast as a voguer in the 2017 film Saturday Church.

Rodriguez has a recurring role as Enrico in The Deuce on HBO.

==== Role in Pose ====
Rodriguez was cast in Pose in 2018, Ryan Murphy's FX television series about New York City ball culture in the late 1980s. Rodriguez portrays Lemar Khan, a young dancer and voguer who belongs to House of Abundance, then the House of Ferocity, and then the House of Evangelista. In the second season, he joins the Wintour House.

The series premiered on June 3, 2018, and attracted critical acclaim. The first season boasted the largest cast of transgender actors ever for a scripted network series with over 50 transgender characters. On July 12, 2018, it was announced that the series had been renewed for a second season, which premiered on June 11, 2019.

Rodriguez is credited as the Movement Coach and Choreographer for Season 2 of Pose.

=== Teaching dance ===
Rodriguez teaches dance in New York City. He teaches the style he practices, new way voguing, at Gibney Dance in Manhattan. He has offered dance workshops for youth and queer people of colour at the LGBT Center, HMI (Hetrick-Martin Institute), and GMHC. He has taught vogue in Vienna, Miami, Iowa, Japan, Dominican Republic and NYC.

== Personal life ==
Rodriguez is queer.

== Filmography ==
=== TV ===
Year	Title	Role	Notes
2016	The Get Down	voguer	
2018–21	Pose	Lemar Khan	Main cast
2019	The Deuce	Enrico	Recurring role

=== Film ===
Year	Title	Role	Notes
2017	Saturday Church	voguer	
