= Angelica Ross =

American actor and businesswoman (born 1980)

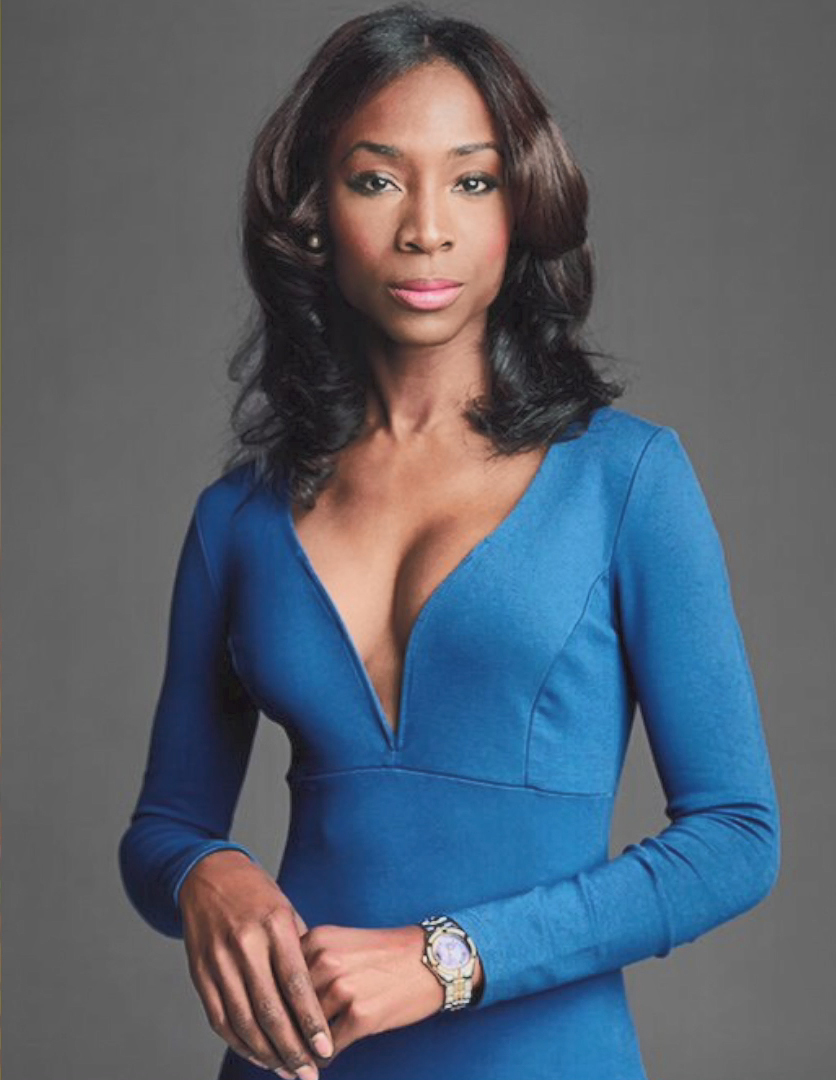
- Ross in 2017
- Born: November 28, 1980 (age 45); Kenosha, Wisconsin, U.S.
- Occupations: Actor; businesswoman
- Years active: 2005–present
- Organization: TransTech Social Enterprises
- Website: missross.com

Angelica Ross (born November 28, 1980) is an American actress, businesswoman, and transgender rights advocate. A self-taught computer programmer, she went on to become founder and CEO of TransTech Social Enterprises, a firm that helps employ transgender people in the tech industry.

Ross began her acting career in the web series Her Story (2016), after which she received further recognition and critical acclaim for her starring roles in the drama series Pose (2018–21) and the anthology horror series American Horror Story (2019–21), both from FX.

== Early life ==
Angelica Ross was born on November 28, 1980, in Kenosha, Wisconsin, then raised to the north in nearby Racine. Ross, a trans woman, has said she was perceived as feminine from a young age. In 1998, when she was 17, she came out as gay to her mother, an evangelical Christian. Her mother did not receive the news well; according to Ross, "she told me I should commit suicide or she would, because she couldn't have someone like me as her child." Ross considered ending her own life and overdosed on medication, but survived.

Upon graduating high school at 17, Ross briefly attended the University of Wisconsin–Parkside before dropping out after one semester. Ross decided to join the U.S. Navy (after her parents signed a waiver so that she could join as a minor) in order to qualify for the G.I. Bill. Ross initially moved to Rochester, New York, before being stationed in Yokosuka, Kanagawa. After six months of service, she requested and received an "uncharacterized" discharge under the "Don't Ask Don't Tell" policy (which was then in force) due to being harassed by enlisted men who coerced her into saying she was gay.

Ross moved back home, and made friends with a drag queen named Traci Ross who helped her begin her gender transition at the age of 19. Upon discovering that she was transitioning, her mother threw her out and Ross moved in with her biological father (who was slightly more accepting of her) in Roanoke, Virginia. Although Ross and her parents were estranged for a time, she states that they have since mended their relationship. During the six years that she lived in Roanoke, Ross worked as a waitress at Applebee's so she could earn enough money to pay rent and attend cosmetology school. Ross then moved to Hollywood, Florida and worked as a model and escort, then web manager, until 2003. She started a web development and graphic design business and took acting classes. She later moved to Chicago to become the employment coordinator for the Trans Life Center.

== Career ==
=== Acting ===
In 2005, Ross made her acting debut in the comedy film Natale a Miami, followed by a role in the short film Bella Maddo (2010). In 2016, Ross received recognition for starring in Her Story, a web series about trans women in Los Angeles. The series was nominated for a Primetime Emmy Award for Outstanding Short Form Comedy or Drama. In 2017, she made guest appearances in the CBS legal drama series Doubt, the TNT crime drama series Claws, and the Amazon Prime Video comedy-drama series Transparent. She also executive produced and starred in the short film Missed Connections, which went on to be an official selection at Outfest 2017, Baltimore International Black Film Festival 2017, La Femme International Film Festival 2017, and Outflix Film Festival 2017 in Memphis, Tennessee. In June 2017, Ross provided voice work for the Amazon Video animated series Danger & Eggs.

Her breakthrough role came in 2018, as Candy Ferocity in Ryan Murphy's FX drama series Pose. For her performance, she earned critical acclaim. She went on to star as psychologist Donna Chambers in the FX anthology horror series American Horror Story: 1984, which made her the first transgender actress to secure two series regular roles. The series was also her second collaboration with Murphy. Her performance garnered critical acclaim by fans and critics alike. In 2021 Ross returned as a series regular for the show's tenth season.

In 2020, Ross signed a deal with Pigeon to develop its television projects. She portrays Georgia, a transgender woman, in the 2022 film Framing Agnes.

Ross made her Broadway debut as Roxie Hart in the musical Chicago in a limited engagement from September 12 to November 6, 2022. With this role, she became the first trans woman to play a leading role on Broadway.

On September 21, 2023, Ross posted on Twitter that she is "leaving Hollywood", having experienced what she perceived as a pattern of mistreatment in the industry. In an interview published the following day, she related more details about her experiences on the set of American Horror Story, and stated that she is moving back to Georgia and preparing to run for public office.

=== Technology ===
Ross taught herself coding, and started her journey in the technology industry in web management. She also learned graphic design and photography using videos online, taking photos for rappers and designing backstage passes. Ross later was hired by the Chicago House's TransLife Center which caters to trans individuals seeking employment, housing and other aid. Her role focused on employment coordination program development.

In 2014, Ross founded the company TransTech Social Enterprises, acting as CEO. The nonprofit creative design firm trains and contracts transgender and other workers. Melissa Harris-Perry brought more attention to the firm in 2015, choosing Ross as her show's first "Foot Soldier" of the year. Educating others on the mission of the firm included MSNBC airing a documentary about it. Ross returned as head of TransTech in 2024, replacing outgoing Executive Director E.C. Pizarro III.

Ross is also the president of Miss Ross, Inc. and founded the TransTech Summit. Ross described the goals of TransTech as including to foster skills in the technology industry, especially for trans people. As the world became more digitized, Ross saw the opportunity for expanding remote working via telecommunication as there can be flexible solutions to workplace issues.

Ross was a featured speaker at the 2015 White House LGBTQ Tech and Innovation Summit.

=== Other ventures ===
In January 2024, Ross announced the launch of a new weekly podcast, N.O.W.: No Opportunity Wasted, featuring "deep discussion on everything from politics to pop culture with world leaders, celebrities and everyday people".

In February 2026, Ross became communications director for the Butch Ware campaign for governor of California.

== Activism ==
Ross was a celebrity ambassador to the 50th Anniversary Stonewall celebration that took place in June 2019 during Pride. On September 20, 2019, Ross hosted the 2020 Presidential Candidate Forum on LGBTQ Issues. This made her the first openly transgender person to host an American presidential forum. On September 28, 2019, Ross was a featured speaker at the National Trans Visibility March in Washington D.C.

== Personal life ==
Ross was once engaged, but called off the engagement as her fiancé did not want others to know that Ross was transgender. She is a practicing Buddhist.

== Filmography ==
=== Film ===
Year	Title	Role	Notes
2005	Natale a Miami	Sharon	
2010	Bella Maddo	Party Guest	Short film
2017	Missed Connections	Jennifer	Short film
2017	The Heart of a Woman	Terri	Short film
2020	Disclosure: Trans Lives on Screen	Herself	Documentary film
2021	Music	Urgent Care Doctor	
2022	Framing Agnes	Georgia	Documentary film
2025	Deep Dish Dimples	Lazette	Short film
2026	Captain Zero: Into the Abyss Part 2	Dr. Niobe & Oblivion (voice role)	Animated short film

=== Television ===
Year	Title	Role	Notes
2015	I Am Cait	Herself	2 episodes
2016	Her Story	Paige	5 episodes; webseries
2017	Doubt	Valentina	Episode: "Clean Burn"
2017	Danger & Eggs	Mayor (voice)	3 episodes
2017	Claws	Relevance	3 episodes
2017	Transparent	Diana Ross Diva	Episode: "Born Again"
2018–2021	Pose	Candy Ferocity	15 episodes
2019	King Ester	Denise	Episode: "Insurance"
2019	American Horror Story: 1984	Donna Chambers	9 episodes
2021	American Horror Story: Double Feature	The Chemist	3 episodes
2021	American Horror Story: Double Feature	Theta	3 episodes
2022	Dead End: Paranormal Park	Margie	Episode: "Wait Time: 22 Minutes"
2023	The Freedom to Exist with Elliot Page - A Soul of a Nation Presentation	Herself	Documentary series
2023	Sort Of	Dr. C	Episode: "The Sort Of Truth"

== Video games ==
Year	Title	Role	Notes
2025	Dead by Daylight	Orela Rose	"Steady Pulse" DLC

== Podcasts ==
Year	Title	Creator	Host	Panelist	Notes
2022	The Man Enough Podcast	No	No	Yes	Episode: "What It Means to be a Protector"
2023	Trials To Triumphs	No	No	Yes	
2024	The Roundtable	No	No	Yes	
2024	NOW - No Opportunity Wasted	Yes	Yes	No	
2024	Transition of Style	No	No	Yes	
2025	Our Culture, Our Histories	No	No	Yes	

== Awards and nominations ==
Year	Association	Category	Nominated work	Result	Ref.
2015	Transgender National Alliance	Be Amazing Award	Angelica Ross	Won	
2016	Black Trans Advocacy Awards	Trailblazer Award	Angelica Ross	Won	
2016	Human Rights Campaign	Visibility Award	Angelica Ross	Won	
2017	GLAAD Media Awards	Outstanding Talk Show Episode	The Daily Show with Trevor Noah	Won	
2017	GLAAD Media Awards	Special Recognition Award	Angelica Ross	Won	
2018	Financial Times	Top 10 LGBT+ Executives	Angelica Ross	Won	
2021	Fast Company	Queer 50	Angelica Ross	Won	

=== Honors ===
- In 2015, Ross was named "1st Foot Soldier of the Year" by Melissa Harris-Perry
- In June 2019, to mark the 50th anniversary of the Stonewall riots, an event widely considered a watershed moment in the modern LGBTQ rights movement, Queerty named her one of the Pride50 "trailblazing individuals who actively ensure society remains moving towards equality, acceptance and dignity for all queer people".
