= Her Story (web series) =

- Genre: Comedy drama
- Created by: Jen Richards, Laura Zak
- Written by: Jen Richards; Laura Zak
- Directed by: Sydney Freeland
- Starring: Jen Richards; Angelica Ross; Laura Zak
- Music by: Allyson Newman; Isley Reust
- Country of origin: United States
- Original language: English
- No. of episodes: 6

Production
- Producers: Kate Fisher; Eve Ensler; Sarah Baker Grillo; Juliet Lopez; Jen Richards; Laura Zak; Stephanie Bell; Tina Pavlides
- Cinematography: Berenice Eveno
- Editor: Bryan Darling

Original release
- Release: January 2016

Her Story is a 2016 drama web series produced exclusively for Internet distribution. The set of six 9-minute episodes tells the story of two transgender women, played by Jen Richards and Angelica Ross, living in Los Angeles and their struggles in dating and in their professional lives.

== Characters ==
Character	Portrayed by	Description	No. of Appearances
Violet	Jen Richards	A transgender woman working as a bartender in Los Angeles.	6
Allie	Laura Zak	A queer reporter in L.A. and love interest of Violet.	6
Paige	Angelica Ross	A transgender woman and attorney at Lambda Legal who represents trans women who have experienced discrimination. Violet's Narcotics Anonymous sponsor.	5
James	Christian Ochoa	A straight, cisgender man and love interest of Paige.	4
Lisa	Caroline Whitney Smith	A trans-exclusionary radical feminist friend of Allie's.	4
Mark	Josh Wingate	Violet's abusive boyfriend.	4
Kat	Fawzia Mirza	A lesbian friend of Allie's.	5

== Episodes ==
Episode No.	Description	Original Release Date	Views (YouTube)
1	Magazine reporter Allie approaches Violet in hopes of interviewing her for an article on trans people in the community. Attorney Paige works to help a trans woman who was not allowed entrance into a women's homeless shelter.	Jan. 18, 2016	655,000
2	While at lunch for their interview, Allie and Violet begin to flirt. Allie finds that her friend Lisa does not accept trans women as women. Paige and Violet discuss how much of themselves they can reveal to others.	Jan. 18, 2016	280,000
3	While Allie and Violet get to know each other better on a night out, Paige goes on a date with James that goes surprisingly well.	Jan. 18, 2016	264,000
4	Allie and Violet are interrupted while watching a movie and snuggling when Violet's boyfriend Mark comes home. Allie begins to fear that Violet is in an abusive relationship. Lisa denies that trans women should be allowed in women's shelters after meeting Paige and her associate Pema. Paige begins to open up to James.	Jan. 18, 2016	251,000
5	Violet abruptly departs Bad Penny's concert, leaving Allie confused. After talking to Penny, Allie follows Violet back to her house to find that Mark had beat her. And not for the first time.	Jan. 19, 2016	245,000
6	After outing Paige as transgender, Lisa is confronted by her. Paige then faces James, who reveals a truth of his own and accepts Paige as she is. Violet leaves Mark's home for good and goes to Allie, kissing her in lieu of words.	Jan. 19, 2016	333,000

== Production ==
Jen Richards originally planned on producing the web series for $10,000, but when producer Kate Fisher joined the project, $40,000 was raised through crowdfunding, and the series budget capped at $150,000 with the addition of two grants and money from Fisher's savings for graduate school. Richards claims she was able to publicize the series widely in part due to her connections with trans people, especially those like Caitlyn Jenner, with whom Richards worked with on her show I Am Cait, and others such as Laverne Cox, Kerry Washington, and Eve Ensler (who came on as an executive producer).

== Awards and nominations ==
Year	Award	Category	Result	Ref.
2016	Primetime Emmy Awards	Outstanding Short Form Comedy or Drama Series	Nominated	
2016	Gotham Independent Film Award	Breakthrough Series - Short Form	Won	
2017	Aritos Awards	Outstanding Achievement in Casting - Short Form or Web Series	Won	
2017	GLAAD Media Award	Special Recognition	Won	
