= Steven Canals =

American screenwriter (born 1980)

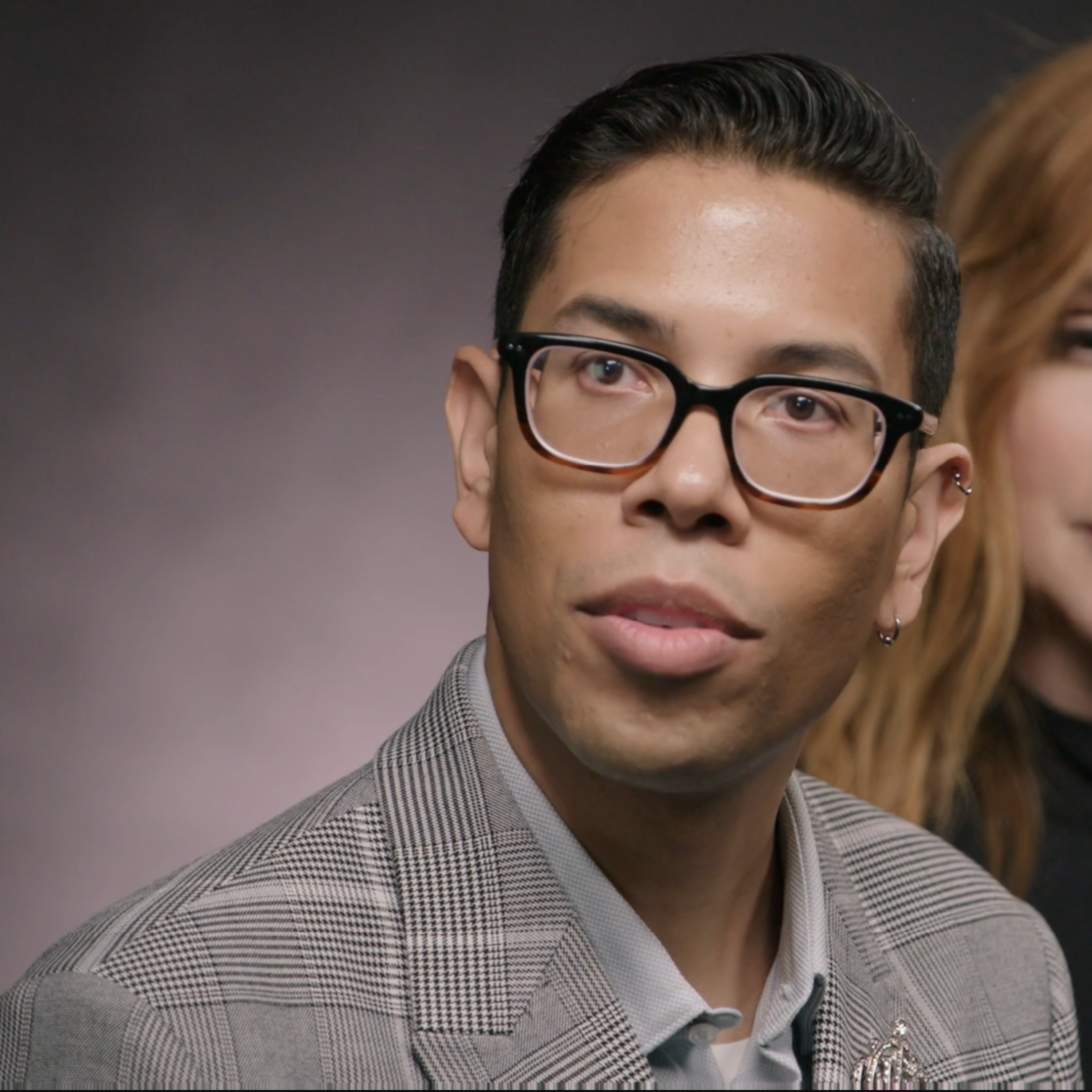
- Canals in 2019
- Born: September 14, 1980 (age 45)
- Education: Binghamton University (BA, MA); University of California, Los Angeles (MFA)
- Occupations: Screenwriter, Producer
- Years active: 2016–present
- Notable work: Pose

Steven Canals (born September 14, 1980) is an American screenwriter and producer. He is best known for co-creating and executive-producing the FX television show Pose.

== Early life and education ==
Canals grew up in the Housing Projects in Castle Hill, Bronx. He began practicing filmmaking at the Youth Ministries for Peace and Justice after school program. He co-produced his first documentary about gang violence with other classmates when he was 15.

Canals graduated with a BA in cinema and MA in student affairs from Binghamton University in 2005 and 2008 respectively. Canals received his MFA in screenwriting from UCLA School of Theater, Film and Television in 2015.

== Career ==
Prior to working in entertainment, Canals worked in university administration. He worked as an LGBT resource coordinator at SUNY-Cortland while completing his master's degree part time, where he was also residence hall director of Shea Hall and advisor to the university's gay-straight alliance for six years. Allegheny College appointed Canals as associate director for gender and sexual orientation initiatives in June 2011.

=== Entertainment ===
Canals was a staff writer on Freeform's Dead of Summer in 2016. His short film Afuera premiered at the LA Film Festival that same year.

Canals developed the pilot script for television show Pose while studying at UCLA in 2014. He was initially inspired by the story in Paris Is Burning. He however found it difficult to get the script developed as industry executives found the subject matter about LGBT people of color and ball culture to be "too niche". Ryan Murphy, co-creator of Glee and American Horror Story, would later come on as a producer in 2016, along with his producing partner Brad Falchuk. The first season premiered in June 2018 on FX. The show is noted to have the largest transgender cast in television history.

He was named a "writer to watch" by Variety in 2018.

Canals signed an overall deal with 20th Century Fox Television in January 2020.

== Personal life ==
Canals is openly queer.

He is of African American and Puerto Rican heritage.

== Filmography ==
Year	Title	Credited as			Notes
Year	Title	Director	Writer	Producer	Notes
2016	Dead of Summer	No	Yes	No	Co-wrote "The Devil Inside" with Richard Naing
2018–2021	Pose	Yes	Yes	Executive	Co-creator, directed 5 episodes and wrote 15
2022	Love, Victor	Yes	No	No	Episode: "The Setup"
2023	Class of '09	Yes	No	No	2 episodes
2023	Neon	Yes	No	No	2 episodes
2024	American Sports Story	Yes	No	No	2 episodes
2024	The Sex Lives of College Girls	Yes	No	No	Episode: "Halloween & Oat Milk"
2025	Doctor Odyssey	Yes	No	No	Episode: "Spring Break"
