= Hailie Sahar =

American actress (born 1988)

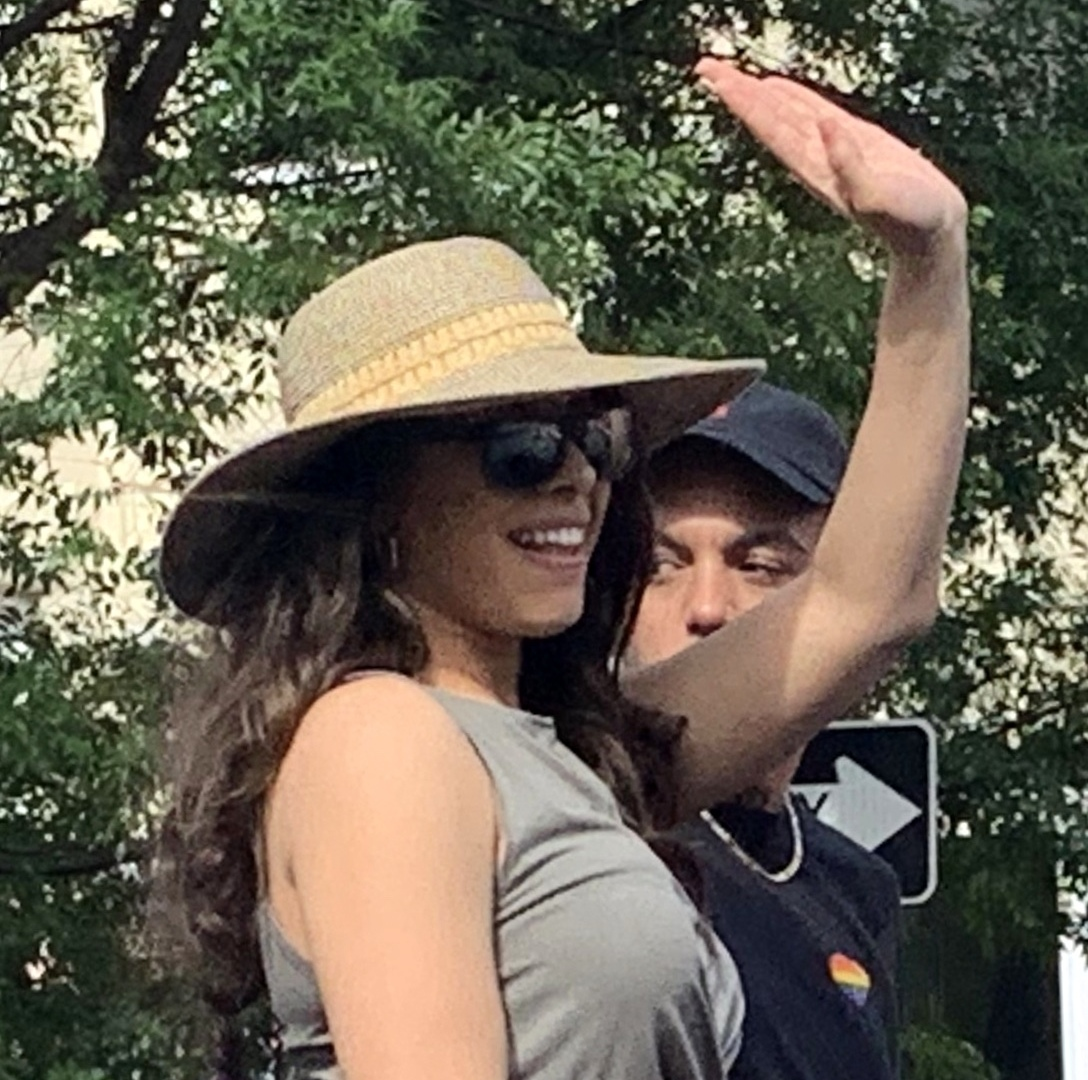
- Sahar at 2019 Capital Pride
- Born: 1988 (age 37–38)
- Occupations: Actress singer
- Years active: 2011–present

Hailie Sahar (born 1988) is an American producer, actress and recording artist. She is known for her performance as Lulu Ferocity in the television series Pose. In 2023, she released her debut single "Star Traveler".

== Early life ==
Sahar was born in 1988. She is of African, Latin American, Indian, German, and Jewish descent. Her father was a preacher in a Baptist church. She grew up in a religious household in Los Angeles with five brothers. As a child, Sahar was a dancer for L.A.'s WNBA team, the Sparks. Sahar participated in Los Angeles Ball scene, and at 18, she became one of the youngest leaders of a house in the ball community by becoming the "mother" of the House of Rodeo, roughly a year after initially joining the house. Later, Sahar moved to the House of Allure. She describes herself as a woman of trans experience.

== Career ==
Sahar landed her first on-screen role in the 2011 film Leave It on the Floor. She was also cast as a minor character in USA Network's television series Mr. Robot and Amazon MGM Studios's comedy-drama series Transparent. Sahar also starred in the Off-Broadway production of Charm. Sahar portrays Lulu Evangelista-Ferocity as part of the main cast of Pose, an FX TV series that began in 2018. In 2019 Sahar began playing the recurring character Jazmin on the Freeform TV show Good Trouble. Sahar released her first single "Star Traveler" on 1 June 2023, with its accompanying music video released on 15 June 2023 starring Sahar and transgender actress Ryanne Parker, directed by Jayce Baron and Sahar.

== Filmography ==
=== Film ===
Year	Title	Role	Notes
2011	Leave It on the Floor	Cashier	

=== Television ===
Year	Title	Role	Notes
2016	Transparent	Adriana	Episode: "Elizah"
2017	Mr. Robot	Lady of the Night	2 episodes
2018–21	Pose	Lulu	Main role; 22 episodes
2019–24	Good Trouble	Jazmin	Recurring Role; 15 episodes
2019	Eastsiders	Marta	4 episodes
2020	Equal	Sylvia Rivera	Episode: "Stonewall: From Rebellion to Liberation"
