= Ryan Jamaal Swain =

American actor and dancer (born 1994)

- Born: March 13, 1994 (age 32); Orlando, Florida, U.S.
- Education: Howard University
- Occupations: Actor; dancer
- Years active: 2017–present

Ryan Jamaal Swain (born March 13, 1994) is an American actor and dancer. He is known for his role as Damon Richards-Evangelista in the FX television series Pose.

== Early life ==
Ryan Swain was born to a single-mother household in Orlando, Florida, on March 13, 1994. He is the eldest of four children and grew up in Birmingham, Alabama.

Whereas his family members geared towards the healthcare field, Swain showed an affinity for the arts at a young age. He began tap dancing lessons at the age of four and expanded his repertoire to include ballet, jazz, modern and hip-hop dancing. During his childhood, Swain worked with the Alabama Dance Academy, Alabama Ballet, Red Mountain Theatre Company, Birmingham Children's Theatre and Virginia Samford Theatre.

He began catalog modeling at the age of eight, and did not pursue acting until his freshman year of high school at the Alabama School of Fine Arts. At the time, Swain was initially seeking an internship—as he was training to become a professional tennis player. He would go on to earn his B.F.A. from Howard University in Washington, D.C., and study at the British American Drama Academy in Oxford, U.K. Swain relocated to New York City upon completing his studies.

== Career ==
=== Stage ===
While attending Howard University, Swain appeared in productions such as Anything Goes. He has also performed in plays including Six Degrees of Separation and Thoughts of a Colored Man, as well as starring in several Off-Broadway productions such as Kill Move Paradise at the National Black Theatre in New York. Despite his small screen debut, Swain still gives back to the theater community. In 2018, it was reported that he hosted an impromptu acting workshop at the Forma Arts + Wellness studio in Birmingham.

=== Film ===
In 2017, Swain was cast as Damon Richards in Ryan Murphy's FX television series Pose. The series premiered on June 3, 2018, and attracted critical acclaim. The first season boasted the largest cast of transgender actors ever for a scripted network series, with over 50 transgender characters. On July 12, 2018, it was announced that the series had been renewed for a second season, which was set to premiere sometime in 2019. Due to his Southern background, Swain had never heard of or been exposed to the ball culture depicted in Pose. Swain based his performance on his viewing of the 1990 documentary Paris is Burning during his college years. He also drew upon his experience of moving to New York City with just "50 dollars in his pocket" in order to pursue his dreams. Swain's character returned for the first episode of the third and final season, but was written out for the second half of the episode, which was filmed during Swain's exit from the series due to the death of Swain's real-life sister.

=== Writing ===
Swain's first major foray into writing was in 2014 when he wrote and starred in A Negro Writer, a one-man show about the life of American writer Langston Hughes. He announced plans to write a teen fiction book about a Southern teenager.

== Personal life ==
Although Swain's family has been largely supportive of his artistic endeavors, he has still experienced his share of adversity. During Swain's childhood, his stepfather became physically and emotionally abusive towards him due to his sexuality. Swain's sister, Raven Lynette Swain, was shot and killed in Birmingham, Alabama, on July 28, 2020, which precipitated Swain's desire to exit from Pose and his character being written out of the series after the first episode of the third season. Swain is queer.

== Filmography ==
=== Film ===
Year	Title	Role	Notes
2019	Engaged	Elliot	Short film
2025	1 Million Followers	Myami	
2026	Relationship Goals	Ronald	

=== Television ===
Year	Title	Role	Notes
2018–2021	Pose	Damon Evangelista	18 episodes
2020	Acting for a Cause	A-Gay	Episode: "Hit the Wall"
2022	The First Lady	Johnny Wright	Episode: "Punch Perfect"
2025	Sub/liminal	Jules Grealy	
2026	Survival of the Thickest	Designer	Episode 3 Season 3

=== Theater ===
Year	Title	Role	Notes
2019	Thoughts of a Colored Man	Love	Syracuse Stage, Baltimore Center Stage
