= Dominique Jackson (model) =

Trinidadian actress, author and model

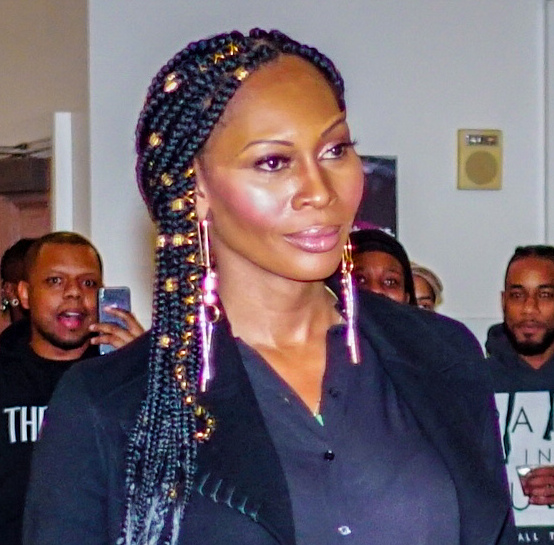
- Jackson at World AIDS Day 2018
- Born: March 20, 1975 (age 51); Scarborough, Trinidad and Tobago
- Other name: Tyra Allure Ross
- Occupations: Actress; model; author; television personality
- Height: 6 ft 1 in (1.85 m)
- Spouse: Al Jackson (m. 2016; div. 2018)

Dominique Brebnor (born March 20, 1975), known professionally as Dominique Jackson and Tyra Allure Ross, is a Tobagonian-American actress, author, model, and reality television personality. As an actress, she is best known for her leading role of Elektra Abundance on the FX television series Pose. As a model, she has appeared in Vogue España.

== Early life ==
Dominique Jackson was born on March 20, 1975, in Scarborough, Tobago, Trinidad and Tobago. Jackson grew up with her grandmother. She experienced a traumatic upbringing that included bullying and sexual abuse. Her family and community in Tobago did not accept her as transgender, and she was regularly reprimanded for displaying her natural feminine characteristics. At age 15, she moved to the United States and lived with her mother.

During her time in the United States, Jackson experienced homelessness and turned to sex work and living off credit cards for survival. It was in 1993, while living in Baltimore, Maryland, that Jackson was introduced to the ballroom scene. She then lived in various houses, including Revlon and Allure, before settling in the House of Sinclair in New York City.

== Career ==
=== Modeling ===
So that she could develop the right opportunities, Jackson did most of her early modeling work for free. In 2009, she became a resident model for fashion designer Adrian Alicea and walked for the Mercedes-Benz Fashion Week. She has also modeled for Vogue España. She walked for the 2021 Mugler show, along with another trans model, Hunter Schafer.

=== Television and film ===
Jackson has appeared in My TRUTH, My STORY, a Caribbean LGBTQ oral history and storytelling documentary series produced by the Caribbean Equality Project, the documentary Visible: The LGBTQ Caribbean Diaspora and the Oxygen reality television series Strut (2016). Her work on Strut earned her a GLAAD Media Award nomination.

In 2018, Jackson began appearing in the leading role of Elektra Abundance on the FX series Pose, set in the ballroom subculture scene in late-1980s New York City. The series premiered on June 3, 2018, and attracted critical acclaim. The first season boasted the largest cast of transgender actors for a scripted network series, with over 50 transgender characters/actors. She continued her role as Elektra Wintour in Pose's second and third seasons.

In 2021, Jackson starred alongside Dionne Warwick and others in the short film Passage, created by Solange Knowles.

=== Writing and community service ===
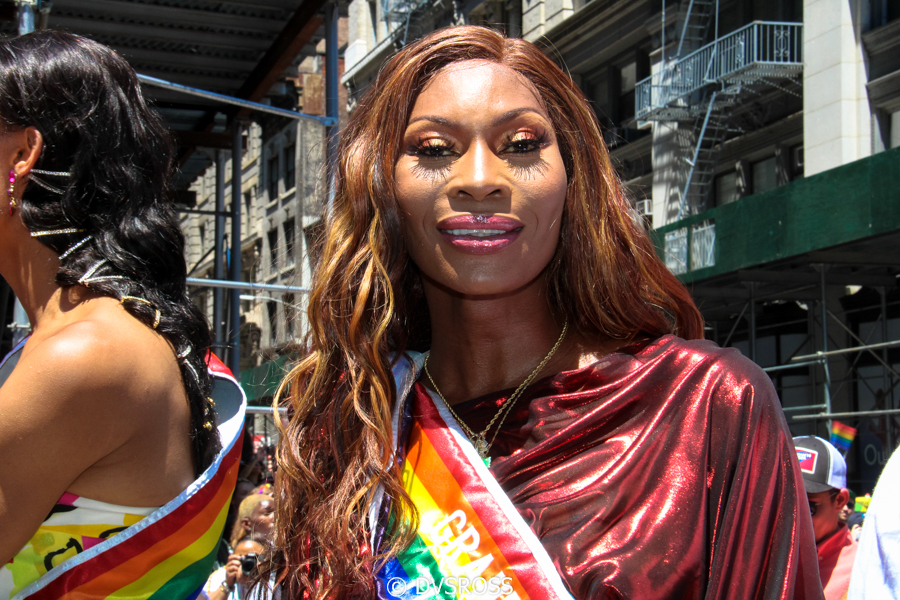
Jackson as Grand Marshal of the 2019 NYC Pride March

Jackson has been open about her mental health struggles. After a thirteen-year writing process, she released her autobiography The Transsexual from Tobago. She has worked for several nonprofit organizations, such as Destination Tomorrow in the Bronx, that provide outreach and services to the LGBTQ+ community.

In 2020, Jackson appeared in a series of public service announcements created by the Human Rights Campaign in cooperation with WarnerMedia, to support trans and non-binary communities.

== Personal life ==
Jackson grew up very religious and was an active member of the church from a young age. When she was a child her family moved to New York, but she remained living with her grandmother in Trinidad and Tobago. Jackson revealed that around 11 years old she was sexually abused by a member of her church.

At 15 years old, she moved to Baltimore with her mother. During that time, she came in contact with the trans community for the first time.

She obtained her green card in 2015, and also underwent gender-affirming surgery the same year.

She married Al Jackson at a courthouse in 2016 after dating for about 18 years. The wedding ceremony was held during an episode of Strut.

In 2018, while vacationing at a resort in Aruba, Jackson reported to the authorities that a man attempted to rape her.

In 2020, Jackson revealed on her social media that she had separated from her husband in late 2018.

On an episode of House Hunters that aired on June 1, 2021, it was presented that Jackson was engaged to her personal manager, Edwin Torres.

== Filmography ==
=== Film ===
Year	Title	Role	Notes
2015	MY TRUTH, MY STORY: A Caribbean LGBTQ+ Oral History Project	Herself	Documentary
2020	Chick Fight	Naomi	
2023	Visible: The LGBTQ Caribbean Diaspora	Herself	Documentary
2025	Queens of the Dead	Yasmine	

=== Television ===
Year	Title	Role	Notes
2009	Christopher Street: The Series	Health Specialist	Film debut, TV movie
2015	Call Me	Nicolette	Episode: "Pilot"
2016	Strut	Herself	6 episodes
2018–21	Pose	Elektra	25 episodes
2020, 2022	Legendary	Herself	2 episodes
2021	American Gods	Ms. World	3 episodes
2022	American Horror Stories	Bloody Mary	Episode: "Bloody Mary"
2023	We Baby Bears	Cassi (voice)	Episode: "Little Fallen Stars"
2024	Fantasmas	Algorithm	Episode: "Valued Customer to table"
2024	Monster High	Phoenix (voice)	2 episodes

== Bibliography ==
- The Transsexual from Tobago (Revised) (2013)

== See also ==
- LGBTQ culture in New York City
- List of LGBTQ people from New York City
