= Carlito Olivero =

American singer and actor of Puerto Rican descent (born 1989)

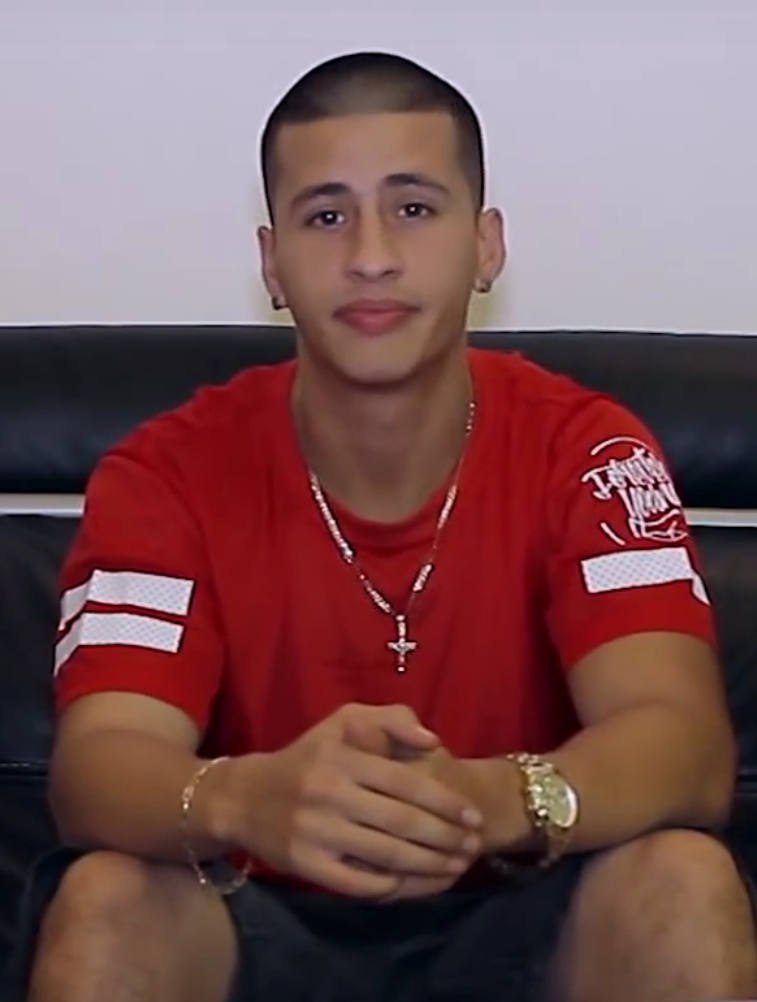
- Olivero in 2014

Background information
- Born: Carlos Emmanuel Olivero; July 16, 1989 (age 37); Chicago, Illinois, U.S.
- Genres: Pop, Latin pop, R&B
- Occupations: Singer, actor
- Instruments: Vocals, guitar
- Years active: 2007–present
- Formerly of: Menudo

Carlos Emmanuel Olivero (born July 16, 1989), known professionally as Carlito Olivero, is an American singer and actor of Puerto Rican and Mexican descent. From 2007 to 2009, he was part of the Latin boy band Menudo after taking part in MTV's Making Menudo. Moving to Los Angeles in 2009, he appeared in various singing and acting events and in 2012 appeared in the film We the Party directed by Mario Van Peebles. In 2013, he auditioned for season 3 of the American singing competition series The X Factor and was the last contestant eliminated in the competition. He was mentored by Paulina Rubio.

== Early life ==
Olivero was born and raised in Chicago, to a father from Puerto Rico and a mother from Mexico. He started singing very early, after his parents bought him a karaoke machine, and he sang along with it. His father and his aunt were break dancers. From grade one onwards, he started taking part in competitions singing mainly Elvis Presley, 'NSYNC and B2K songs.

== In Making Menudo (2007) ==
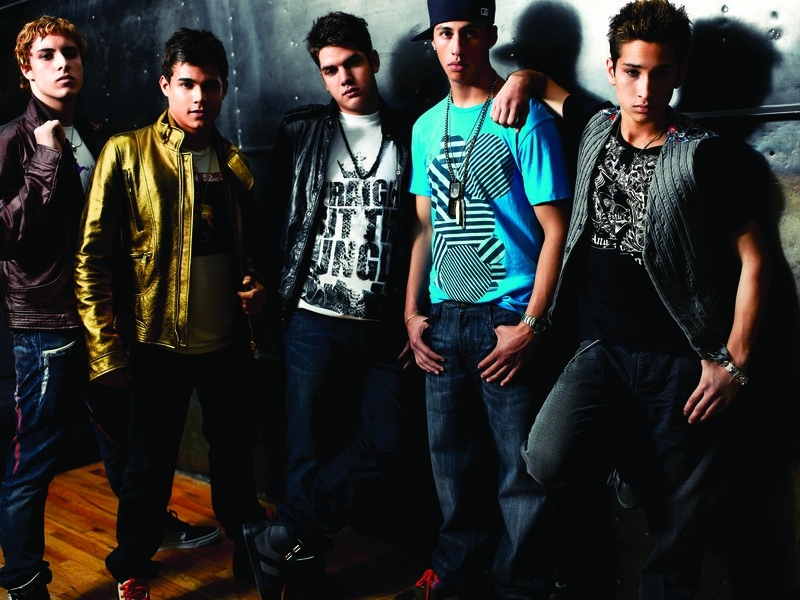
2007–2009 lineup. L-to-R: José Bordonada Collazo, Monti Montañez (Che Antonio), Emmanuel Vélez Pagan, Carlos Olivero, Chris Moy

In 2007, Carlito Olivero took part in an MTV reality series titled Making Menudo to earn a spot in the reconfigured famous Latin boy band. Ricky Martin and Draco Rosa were two of many who rotated through the band over the years. Making Menudo launched as a primetime series on October 25, 2007, but was later pushed to afternoons due to low ratings.

The initial Menudo five chosen in the program (JC, Jorge, Monti Montanez (Che Antonio), Jose and Chris) were put up against four other aspiring candidates who didn't make the cut (Antony, Pena, JC Gonzalez, Trevor and Carlos). Eventually Carlos [Olivero] was chosen to be included in Menudo's "final" set-up.

== In band Menudo (2007–2009) ==
The "new" Menudo band was made up of:

- Carlos Emmanuel Olivero
- José "Monti" Antonio Montañez (Che Antonio)
- Emmanuel Jose Vélez Pagán
- Christopher Nelson Moy
- José Bordonada Collazo

The act was signed to a multi-album contract with Sony BMG label Epic Records. The group continued for two years starting in 2007 with their debut singles "Lost" and "More Than Words". The new Menudo disbanded in 2009.

== The X Factor (2013) ==
In 2013, Olivero auditioned for season 3 of the American The X Factor. At the time he applied, he was employed as a server in a coffee shop. He was mentored by Paulina Rubio and was the last contestant eliminated.

Olivero's performances include:

| Day of broadcast | Show | Theme | Song | Original artist | Result |
|---|---|---|---|---|---|
| September 12 | Audition | Free choice | "Stay" | Rihanna ft. Mikky Ekko | Through to Four-Chair challenge |
| October 9 | Four-Chair Challenge | Solo performance | "Dreaming of You" | Selena | Advanced |
| October 29 | Live show 1 (Top 16) | Act/Mentor's choice | "Maria Maria" | Santana ft. The Product G&B | Saved by Paulina Rubio |
| November 6 | Live show 2 (Top 13) | Motown Night | "Stop! In the Name of Love" | The Supremes | N/A |
| November 7 | Live show 3 (Top 13 Redux) | Free choice | "If You're Not the One" | Daniel Bedingfield | Safe |
| November 13 | Live show 4 (Top 12) | 80's Night | "Rhythm Is Gonna Get You" | Gloria Estefan and Miami Sound Machine | Safe |
| November 20 | Live show 5 (Top 10) | British Invasion | (I Can't Get No) Satisfaction | The Rolling Stones | Bottom 2^{1} |
| November 21 | Live show 5 (Top 10) | Sing-off | Beneath Your Beautiful | Labrinth and Emeli Sandé | Bottom 2^{1} |
| November 27 | Live show 6 (Top 8) | Big Band Night | "La Copa de Vida"/"María" | Ricky Martin | Safe |
| December 4 | Live show 7 (Top 6) | Divas | "Let's Get Loud" | Jennifer Lopez | Bottom 2^{2} |
| December 4 | Live show 7 (Top 6) | Unplugged "stripped down" Songs | "Stand by Me" | Ben E. King | Bottom 2^{2} |
| December 5 | Live show 7 (Top 6) | Sing-off | "You Make Me Wanna..." | Usher | Bottom 2^{2} |
| December 11 | Live show 8 (Top 4) | Viewers' choice | "Boyfriend" | Justin Bieber | Safe |
| December 11 | Live show 8 (Top 4) | Duet (with Alex & Sierra) | "Falling Slowly" | Glen Hansard and Markéta Irglová | Safe |
| December 11 | Live show 8 (Top 4) | 2nd song (no theme) | "I Need to Know" | Marc Anthony | Safe |
| December 12 | Live show 8 (Top 4) | Victory song | "Suavemente" | Elvis Crespo | Safe |
| December 18 | Live show 9 (Top 3) | Winner's Song | "Impossible" | Shontelle | Eliminated |
| December 18 | Live show 9 (Top 3) | Celebrity Duets | "Stand by Me" (with Prince Royce) | Ben E. King | Eliminated |
| December 18 | Live show 9 (Top 3) | Favorite Performance | "Maria Maria" | Santana ft. The Product G&B | Eliminated |
| December 19 | Live show 9 (Top 3) | Christmas Songs | "Christmas (Baby Please Come Home)" | Darlene Love | Eliminated |

^Note 1 Olivero was in the bottom three and had to sing for survival. However, he survived the final showdown against Tim Olstad.
^Note 2 Olivero was in the bottom three and had to sing for survival. However, he survived the final showdown against Rion Paige.

== Acting career ==
After disbandment, Olivero relocated to Los Angeles to pursue a singing / acting career. He appeared in small roles in TNT network series Rizzoli & Isles and in an advertisement for Starbucks. and Time Warner cable. He appeared in season 6 episode 9 of Modern Family, as Teddy Keys, dating Alex.

In 2012, Olivero appeared in a main role in We the Party, a film written and directed by Mario Van Peebles. Credited as Carlito Olivero, he plays the role of Paco in the film.

From 2015 to 2017, Olivero starred in the successful Hulu Original Series, East Los High. In 2018, Carlito starred in the YouTube Red scripted drama series, Step Up: High Water. He played the role of Derek Sandoval in the thriller film Bad Samaritan, directed by Dean Devlin, which premiered on May 4, 2018.

On October 18, 2019, it was reported that Olivero had been cast in the upcoming film Escape Room: Tournament of Champions, the sequel to the 2019 psychological thriller film Escape Room which was released on July 16, 2021.

== Personal life ==
Olivero is in a relationship with dancer and actress Jade Chynoweth.

== Discography ==
=== Studio albums ===
Title and details
D.D.B.R.W.S.
- Type: Studio album
- Released: July 16, 2015
- Recorded: 2013–15
- Genre: R&B, Hip Hop, Latin pop
- Length: 41:26
- Label: Indie Art Music
- Producer: Dem Jointz
Notes

| No. | Title | Writer(s) | Length |
|---|---|---|---|
| 1. | "Wrong Way" | Carlito Olivero | 3:12 |
| 2. | "Long Ride Home" | Carlito Olivero | 5:26 |
| 3. | "Pon Ya Body" | Carlito Olivero | 3:25 |
| 4. | "Not The Only One" | Carlito Olivero | 3:53 |
| 5. | "Supply & Demand" | Carlito Olivero | 3:59 |
| 6. | "Never Sober" | Carlito Olivero | 4:12 |
| 7. | "Tell Her" | Carlito Olivero | 3:49 |
| 8. | "Find Your Way Back" | Carlito Olivero | 3:35 |
| 9. | "P.O.Y.F." | Carlito Olivero | 2:49 |
| 10. | "Put Ya Fire Out" | Carlito Olivero | 3:47 |
| 11. | "A.D.D." | Carlito Olivero | 3:19 |
| Total length: | | | 41:26 |

=== Solo singles ===
| Year | Title | Peak chart positions | | Album |
| Year | Title | U.S. R&B | U.S. Rap | Album |
|---|---|---|---|---|
| 2011 | "Rain" | — | — | Non-album release |
| 2012 | "Love Letter" | — | — | Non-album release |
| 2015 | "Pon Ya Body" | — | — | D.D.B.R.W.S. |

=== Guest appearances ===
List of non-single guest appearances, with other performing artists, showing year released and album name
| Title | Year | Other artist(s) | Album |
|---|---|---|---|
| "Brown Eyed Girl" | 2010 | Royalty | —N/a |
| "Hit Me (BBM Me) If You Miss Me" | 2011 | Baby Bash, Printz Board | Bashtown |
| "Tabloid Truth" | 2012 | J. Dash | Tabloid Truth |
| "Art of Love" | 2014 | Danny Olson | —N/a |

=== Music videos ===
List of music videos, with directors, showing year released
| Title | Year | Director(s) |
|---|---|---|
| "Rain" | 2011 | Mike Ho, Carlito Olivero, Jimmy Burney |
| "Love Letter" | 2012 | Mike Ho |
| "Find Your Way Back" | 2014 | Denzel Whitaker |
| "Pon Ya Body" | 2015 | Denzel Whitaker, Maximilian Shelton |

== Filmography ==
=== Film ===
| Year | Title | Role | Notes |
|---|---|---|---|
| 2012 | We the Party | Paco | |
| 2015 | Chocolate City | Raphael | |
| 2015 | Breaking Through | Ricky | |
| 2017 | Blood Heist | Junior | |
| 2017 | Remix | Manny | Short film |
| 2018 | Bad Samaritan | Derek Sandoval | |
| 2021 | Escape Room: Tournament of Champions | Theo | |
| TBA | Domino: Battle of the Bones | Frederico | Post-production |

=== Television ===
| Year | Title | Role | Notes |
|---|---|---|---|
| 2012 | Rizzoli & Isles | Reuben Sanchez | Episode: "Virtual Love" |
| 2013 | The X Factor | Himself / Contestant | Season 3; finished in third place |
| 2014 | Modern Family | Teddy | Episode: "Strangers in the Night" |
| 2015–2017 | East Los High | Eddie | Recurring role; 25 episodes |
| 2016 | Making Moves | Jules | Main role; 9 episodes |
| 2018–2022 | Step Up: High Water | Davis Jimenez | Main role |
| 2026 | Wonder Man | Esteban | 2 episodes |
