= Michaela Jaé Rodriguez =

American actress and singer (born 1991)

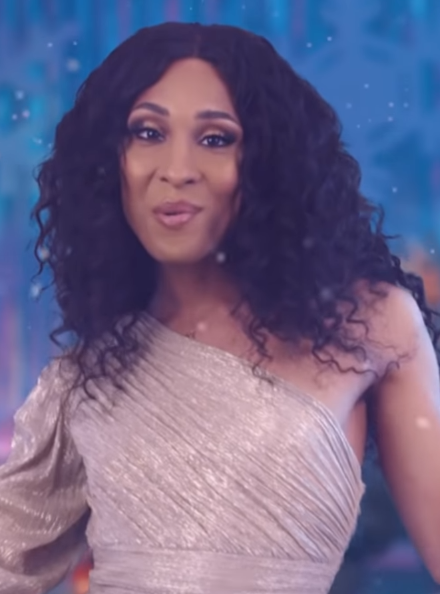
- Rodriguez in 2020
- Born: January 7, 1991 (age 35); Newark, New Jersey, U.S.
- Education: Berklee College of Music
- Occupations: Actress; singer
- Years active: 2011–present

Michaela Antonia Jaé Rodriguez (born January 7, 1991), formerly known as Mj Rodriguez, is an American actress and singer. Born in Newark, New Jersey, Rodriguez attended several performing arts schools in her youth before being cast in a theater production of Rent as Angel Dumott Schunard, winning the 2011 Clive Barnes Award for her performance.

Following her performance in Rent, Rodriguez took a hiatus from performing to transition. From 2012 to 2016, Rodriguez began to work on stage again and appeared in small television roles, including Nurse Jackie, The Carrie Diaries, and Luke Cage.

In 2017, Rodriguez was cast as one of the lead roles in the FX television series Pose, making her part of the largest cast of transgender actresses to be starring as series regulars in a scripted series. Her performance as Blanca Evangelista garnered critical acclaim. In 2021, she became the first transgender woman to earn an Emmy Award nomination in a major acting category; she was nominated for Outstanding Lead Actress in a Drama Series for her performance in the third and final season of Pose and won the Golden Globe Award for Best Actress – Television Series Drama.

== Early life and education ==
Rodriguez was born on January 7, 1991, in Newark, New Jersey to an African-American mother and a father of Puerto Rican and African-American descent. Rodriguez attended Queen of Angels Catholic School. She wanted to become an actress from the age of seven, and began pursuing the profession at the age of 11 after her mother enrolled her in the New Jersey Performing Arts Center—where she became an eight-year veteran of the program and participated in its New Jersey Youth Theater program.

While she had "prayed to become female" beginning at age 7, Rodriguez states that she was in denial for many years and initially came out to her parents as "bisexual/gay" at the age of 14. At 14, Rodriguez became involved in the ballroom scene where she found support from her house father who taught her to vogue. She is a graduate of Newark Arts High School, and later attended Berklee College of Music, where she was a 2009 Star-Ledger scholarship recipient and a 2009 Young Arts first level scholarship recipient. She eventually took the stage name "Mj" Rodriguez after the Marvel Comics character Mary Jane "MJ" Watson, being a self-described comic book geek and from putting the letters together from parts of her birth name.

== Career ==
=== Stage acting origins ===
While attending college, Rodriguez was cast in a theater production of Rent as Angel Dumott Schunard. Rodriguez had wanted to play the role since first seeing the 2005 film adaptation. She connected with actress Fredi Walker-Browne (the actress who originated the Broadway role of Joanne Jefferson in Rent) who was in attendance at one of Rodriguez's performances. Walker-Browne asked Rodriguez to read for the part of Angel and helped her to land an audition in an upcoming off-Broadway production of Rent. Rodriguez was cast for the role in the off-Broadway production, and acted alongside then-up and coming stage actor Annaleigh Ashford (cast as Maureen). Rodriguez' performance garnered her the 2011 Clive Barnes Award that was established in honor of the late English writer and critic Clive Barnes.

=== Transition and reemergence ===
During this period, Rodriguez began to fully explore the transitioning process. Following the conclusion of the off-Broadway revival in 2012, Rodriguez made the decision to go on hiatus to begin transition. Beginning with hormone replacement therapy in early 2016, and allowing sufficient time for privacy, Rodriguez reemerged as an actress. Rodriguez then contacted her representation to inform them that she was no longer auditioning for male roles. Despite her concerns, Rodriguez found her representation to be fully supportive of her new gender identity.

From 2012 to 2016, Rodriguez appeared in small television roles, including Nurse Jackie, The Carrie Diaries, and Luke Cage. Her 2016 appearance in the non-speaking role of "Sister Boy" on Luke Cage also marked the first appearance of both a transgender actress and character in the Marvel Cinematic Universe.

Following her reemergence, Rodriguez uploaded a video of herself on Facebook singing the number "Satisfied" from the Broadway musical Hamilton. The video received a positive response and landed her an invitation to audition for the role of Peggy Schuyler/Maria Reynolds in Hamilton. The news of her audition as a trans-actress for a cisgender role made various Broadway and LGBT news outlets. She then appeared in several additional stage productions:

- Encores! Off-Center's 2016 production of Runaways
- The 2016 off-Broadway premiere of Street Children by Pia Scala-Zankel at the New Ohio Theatre
- The American Repertory Theater's 2017 production of Trans Scripts: Part 1, The Women at the Loeb Drama Center
- The 2017 world premier of the synth-pop musical Burn All Night in the Oberon at the American Repertory Theater in Cambridge

Rodriguez also landed a supporting role in the independent film Saturday Church as Ebony. The 2017 film, which premiered in January 2018, depicted a runaway teenager exploring their gender identity and becoming involved in the contemporary underground ball culture scene. Her portrayal of Ebony earned her a nomination for Best Actress at the 2017 Tribeca Film Festival.

=== Breakthrough with Pose and debut as a singer ===
In 2017, Rodriguez was cast in the leading role of Blanca Evangelista in the FX series Pose following a six-month casting search. The show was created by Ryan Murphy, Brad Falchuk, and Steven Canals and made history by casting five transgender actresses in leading roles. As of 2018, the show features the largest cast of transgender actors as series regulars in a scripted series. The pilot for Pose went into production in November 2017 and premiered in June 2018 to positive reviews.

The series is set in New York City during the 1980s and explores the lives of queer people of color (especially Black trans women) who are involved with the underground ballroom scene. Rodriguez's Blanca is a young woman who forms her own "house"—the House of Evangelista—after receiving a positive diagnosis for HIV. As the head of the House of Evangelista, she becomes a surrogate mother to several abandoned queer youth of color. Described as a "breakout, starring role", her performance has been praised by critics. Among the show's regular cast are Rodriguez's Saturday Church co-star Indya Moore, Tony Award-winner Billy Porter, model Dominique Jackson, trans rights advocate Angelica Ross, Evan Peters, Kate Mara, and James Van Der Beek.

Rodriguez performed with Pose co-stars Dyllón Burnside, Billy Porter and Ryan Jamaal Swain in a benefit concert on July 23, 2018, to celebrate the season 1 finale and raise money for GLSEN and sing "Waving Through a Window" from Dear Evan Hansen.

In 2019, Rodriguez became the first openly transgender woman to win Best Actress - Television at the Imagen Awards.

In the fall of 2019, Rodriguez played Audrey, the leading lady in Pasadena Playhouse's production of Little Shop of Horrors, becoming the first transgender woman of color to play the role in a major production. Her cast mates included George Salazar (from Broadway's Be More Chill) as Seymour and Amber Riley (Glee) as Audrey II. About the role she told Broadway.com, "I'm simply an actress. I think any woman should be considered for this role. [My casting] shouldn't be something that's trending—it should be normal."

On October 1, 2019, she and Little Shop of Horrors co-star George Salazar were the musical guests on The Late Late Show with James Corden on CBS where they performed "Suddenly Seymour".

In November 2019, Rodriguez landed a contract with Olay Body, becoming the first Latina trans woman to enter a partnership with the company. On May 7, 2021, it was reported by Variety that Rodriguez would star alongside Maya Rudolph in Apple TV's upcoming comedy series directed by Alan Yang and Matt Hubbard.

In 2021, she became the first transgender woman to receive an Emmy Award nomination in a major acting category; she was nominated for Outstanding Lead Actress in a Drama Series for her performance in the third and final season of Pose.

On June 4, 2021, Rodriguez released her debut single "Something to Say" under the record label Access Records. The song serves as the lead single for her upcoming debut EP.

In September 2021, Rodriguez announced that she now goes by Michaela Jaé Rodriguez, stating, "I wanted people to see that I was more than just this character that I played on a television screen. ... It was only right and even more personal to let people know who the woman inside of Mj is".

On January 9, 2022, Rodriguez won the Golden Globe Award for Best Actress – Television Series Drama at the 79th Golden Globe Awards, becoming the first transgender actor to win a Golden Globe in the history of the awards.

== Filmography ==
=== Film ===
Year	Title	Role	Notes
2017	Saturday Church	Ebony	
2017	Bun in the Oven	Bertha	Short film
2018	Gema	Gema	Short film
2018	The Big Take	Robyn	
2019	Adam	Emma	
2020	Disclosure	Herself	Documentary film
2021	Tick, Tick... Boom!	Carolyn	
2023	Transformers: Rise of the Beasts	Nightbird (voice)	
2024	Skincare	Marine	

=== Television ===
Year	Title	Role	Notes
2012	Nurse Jackie	Lonna	Episode: "No-Kimono-Zone"
2013	The Carrie Diaries	Fabulous Clubgoer #2	Episode: "Read Before Use"
2016	[Blank] My Life	Kerry	Episode: "Mr. Owl"
2016	Luke Cage	Sister Boy	Episode: "Manifest"
2018–2021	Pose	Blanca Rodriguez-Evangelista	Lead role; 26 episodes
2022	A Black Lady Sketch Show	Beauty Store Clerk	Episode: "Save My Edges, I'm a Donor!"
2022	Dead End: Paranormal Park	Zagan (voice)	3 episodes
2022–present	Loot	Sofia Salinas	Main role
2023–2024	American Horror Story: Delicate	Nicolette	Main role

== Theatre ==
Year	Production	Role	Location	Category
2011	Rent	Angel	New World Stages	Off-Broadway
2016	Runaways	Pixie	Encores! Off-Center	Off-Broadway
2016	Street Children	Gina	New Ohio Theatre	Off-Broadway
2017	Trans Scripts: Part 1, The Women	Luna	Loeb Drama Center	
2017	Burn All Night	Ensemble	Oberon at the American Repertory Theater Cambridge	
2019	Little Shop of Horrors	Audrey	Pasadena Playhouse	Regional
2026	The Rocky Horror Show	Columbia	Studio 54	Broadway

== Discography ==
=== Studio albums ===
Title	Album details
33	Released: September 26, 2024; Label: TribeDisciples; Format: Digital download, streaming

=== Singles ===
Year	Title	Album
2021	"Something to Say"	Non-album single
2024	"I Am"	33
2024	"Green Lights"	33

=== Music videos ===
Year	Title	Director
2021	"Something to Say"	Dano Cerny
2023	"Snow Globe"	Dano Cerny
2024	"Green Lights"	Dano Cerny

== Awards and nominations ==
Year	Award	Category	Nominated work	Result	Ref.
2011	Clive Barnes Award	—N/a	Rent	Won	
2017	Tribeca Film Festival	Best Actress	Saturday Church	Nominated	
2019	Dorian Awards	TV Musical Performance of the Year	Performing "Home" (with Billy Porter and Our Lady J)	Won	
2019	Imagen Awards	Best Actress	Pose	Won	
2019	MTV Movie & TV Awards	Best Breakthrough Performance	Pose	Nominated	
2020	Critics' Choice Television Award	Best Actress in a Drama Series	Pose	Nominated	
2020	Dorian Awards	TV Performance of the Year — Actress	Pose	Nominated	
2021	HCA TV Awards	Best Actress in a Broadcast Network or Cable Series, Drama	Pose	Won	
2021	Primetime Emmy Awards	Outstanding Lead Actress in a Drama Series	Pose	Nominated	
2021	TCA Awards	Individual Achievement in Drama	Pose	Nominated	
2022	Critics' Choice Television Award	Best Actress in a Drama Series	Pose	Nominated	
2022	Golden Globe Awards	Best Actress – Television Series Drama	Pose	Won	
2022	GLAAD Media Awards	Stephen F. Kolzak Award	Herself	Won	

== See also ==
- Transgender culture in New York City
- List of LGBTQ people from New York City
- List of Puerto Ricans
- African American LGBT Community
- Nuyorican
- Puerto Ricans in New York City
- Puerto Ricans in the United States
- Transgender culture of New York City
