= Saturday Church =

2017 film

- Theatrical release poster
- Directed by: Damon Cardasis
- Written by: Damon Cardasis
- Produced by: Damon Cardasis; Adi Ezroni; Rebecca Miller; Mandy Tagger
- Starring: Luka Kain; Margot Bingham; Regina Taylor; Marquis Rodriguez; Michaela Jaé Rodriguez; Indya Moore
- Cinematography: Hillary Spera
- Edited by: Abbi Jutkowitz
- Music by: Nathan Larson
- Production companies: Spring Pictures; Round Films
- Distributed by: Samuel Goldwyn Films
- Release dates: April 23, 2017 (Tribeca Film Festival); January 12, 2018 (United States)
- Running time: 82 minutes
- Country: United States
- Language: English

Saturday Church is a 2017 American musical fantasy drama film written and directed by Damon Cardasis; and was his first feature film. The film stars Luka Kain, Margot Bingham, Regina Taylor, Marquis Rodriguez, Michaela Jaé Rodriguez, and Indya Moore. The film was released on January 12, 2018, by Samuel Goldwyn Films. The concept of the movie is loosely based on the LGBTQ+ outreach program, Art & Acceptance, at St Luke in the Fields located in the West Village of New York City.

== Plot ==
Fourteen-year-old Ulysses lives with his mother, Amara, and younger brother. Because his father has recently died, his father's sister, the conservative Aunt Rose, agrees to help take care of Ulysses and his brother while their mother is at work. Ulysses is bullied at school by his classmates and threatened at home by Rose for his feminine characteristics.

One night Ulysses ventures out into the city and meets a group of transgender and gay individuals, Ebony, Dijon, Raymond, and Heaven. Ebony invites Ulysses to Saturday Church, a program run at a church every Saturday to feed and provide shelter for LGBT youths. While there Ulysses develops an interest in voguing, later buying a pair of high-heel shoes to practice in.

Ulysses also begins to form a relationship with Raymond, who has mutual feelings for him. After returning home from school one day, Aunt Rose is waiting for Ulysses and confronts him about the high heels, which she discovered in his room. Rose begins to beat Ulysses, causing him to run away from the house.

Ulysses attempts to go to Saturday Church for help, but as it is Wednesday, none of his friends are there. Ulysses spends the night at a homeless shelter, where he resolves to accept himself for who he is and not who others want him to be. The next day, Ulysses talks to an older male who invites him to his apartment.

Desperate and hungry, Ulysses prostitutes himself to the man for food and money. On Saturday, Ulysses returns to Saturday Church, where his friends comfort him and offer him a place to stay, but Ulysses wants to see his mother. Back at the house, Amara, who has reported Ulysses as missing to the police, prepares to search for him.

Before she leaves, Ebony escorts Ulysses into the house. Rose, who is also there, verbally berates Ebony and Ulysses, causing Amara to defend them from her sister-in-law until Rose leaves. The next day, Amara reassures Ulysses that her love for him is unconditional. With newfound confidence, Ulysses prepares to vogue in drag in a ballroom scene club.

== Cast ==
- Luka Kain as Ulysses
- Margot Bingham as Amara
- Regina Taylor as Aunt Rose
- Marquis Rodriguez as Raymond Jackson
- Michaela Jaé Rodriguez as Ebony
- Indya Moore as Dijon
- Alexia Garcia as Heaven
- Kate Bornstein as Joan
- Jaylin Fletcher as Abe
- Stephen Conrad Moore as Marshall
- Peter Y. Kim as Mark
- Evander Duck Jr. as Father Lewis

== Release ==
The film premiered at the Tribeca Film Festival on April 23, 2017. On September 5, 2017, Samuel Goldwyn Films acquired distribution rights to the film. The film was released on January 12, 2018, by Samuel Goldwyn Films.

== Reception ==
The review aggregator website Rotten Tomatoes gives the film a rating of 93%, based on 28 reviews, with an average rating of 7.4/10. On Metacritic, the film has a score of 72 out of 100, based on 12 critics, indicating "generally favorable reviews".

== Adaptations ==
A musical theatre adaptation of the film premiered off-Broadway at New York Theatre Workshop in the East Village, Manhattan, in late 2025. The show's first preview was August 27, 2025, with an official opening date of September 15, 2025. The show closed on October 24, 2025.

Directed by Whitney White, the musical has a book by Damon Cardasis and James Ijames and music and lyrics by Sia with additional music by Honey Dijon. The cast included Bryson Battle as Ulysses, J. Harrison Ghee as Black Jesus/Pastor Lewis, Joaquina Kalukango as Aunt Rose, B Noel Thomas as Ebony, Kristolyn Lloyd as Ulysses's mother, and Jackson Kanawha Perry as Raymond. Anania, Primo Thee Ballerino, Veyonce Deleon, Dava Huesca, Kareem Marsh, Caleb Quezon, Wade Watson were also in the cast. Qween Jean was the costume designer, Darrell Grand Moultrie was the choreographer, David Zinn was the set designer, Adam Honoré was the lighting designer, and Gareth Owen was the sound designer. Jason Michael Webb and Luke Solomon were the musical directors.

The musical was critically acclaimed, receiving two Drama Desk Award nominations, two Drama League nominations, three Outer Critics Circle nominations, and five Lucille Lortel award nominations, with Qween Jean winning the Lucille Lortel Award for Outstanding Costume Design.
