= Adam Robitel =

American producer, screenplay, and director

- Born: May 26, 1978 (age 48)
- Education: University of Southern California
- Occupations: Film director; film producer; screenwriter; actor
- Years active: 2006–present

Adam Robitel (born May 26, 1978) is an American film director, producer, screenwriter, and actor. He is best known for directing horror films, such as The Taking of Deborah Logan (2014), Insidious: The Last Key (2018), Escape Room (2019) and its sequel Escape Room: Tournament of Champions (2021). He also co-wrote Paranormal Activity: The Ghost Dimension (2015).

Deadline Hollywood reported in July 2021 that Robitel and co-writer Gavin Heffernan had partnered with Darren Aronofsky on a thriller series for Netflix titled The Craving.

In July 2019, Deadline Hollywood posted that Heffernan and Robitel had teamed up with Sam Raimi on an "Untitled Supernatural Thriller" for Sony Pictures.

== Education ==
Adam Robitel was born on May 28, 1978. Robitel is a graduate of the USC School of Cinematic Arts.

== Personal life ==
Robitel was raised Catholic. He was a gymnast who first pursued acting while at USC. His spec script, The Bloody Benders, garnered the attention of Guillermo Del Toro, and was his first official optioned property.

He credits his grandmother, who raised him and his sister on ghost stories, for his love of all things macabre. Robitel has been with his partner Ray for twenty years.

== Filmography ==
Year	Title	Director	Writer
2014	The Taking of Deborah Logan	Yes	Yes
2015	Paranormal Activity: The Ghost Dimension	No	Yes
2018	Insidious: The Last Key	Yes	No
2019	Escape Room	Yes	No
2021	Escape Room: Tournament of Champions	Yes	No

Acting roles

Year	Title	Role	Notes
2000	X-Men	Guy on Line	
2002	The Rules of Attraction	Dumb Guy from L.A.	Uncredited
2005	2001 Maniacs	Lester	
2006	Return to Sender	Butch	Short film
2010	2001 Maniacs: Field of Screams	Lester	
2011	Chillerama	Butch	Segment: "I Was a Teenage Werebear"
2011	One for the Road	Booth	Short film
2012	Cut/Print	Officer Smith	
2015	Contracted: Phase II	Swat Man #1	
2019	Escape Room	Gabe	
