= Indya Moore =

American actor and model (born 1995)

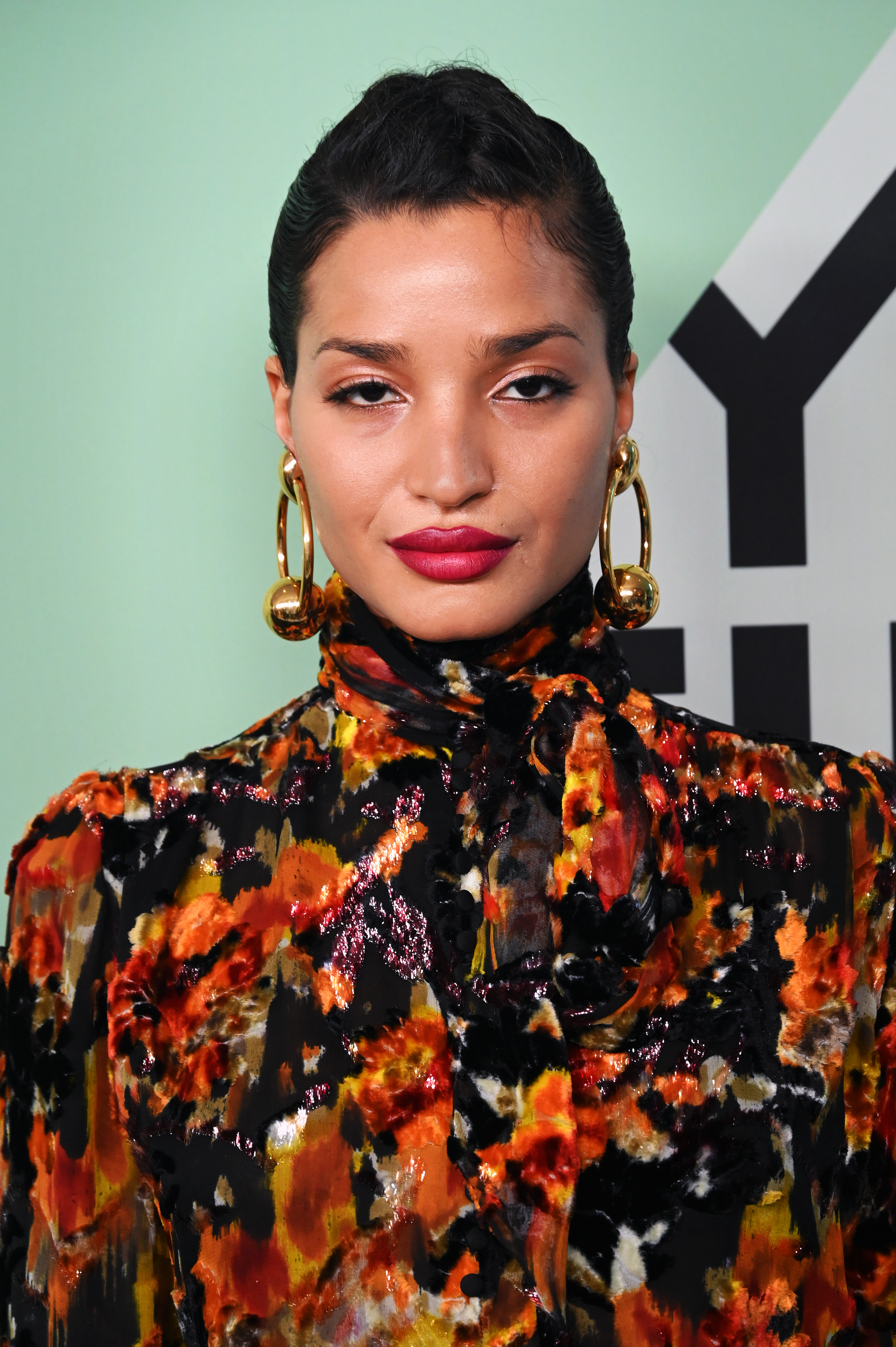
- Moore in 2025
- Born: January 17, 1995 (age 31); New York City, U.S.
- Occupations: Actress; model
- Years active: 2010–present

Indya Adrianna Moore (born January 17, 1995) is an American actress and model. She (Note: On August 31, 2026 Moore shared on an Instragram story that she no longer identifies as non-binary and uses she/her pronouns.) is known for playing the role of Angel Evangelista in the FX television series Pose. Time named her one of the 100 most influential people in the world in 2019. Moore is a transgender woman.

== Early life ==
Indya Adrianna Moore was born on January 17, 1995 in New York City. Assigned male at birth, Moore is a Bronx native of Haitian, Puerto Rican, and Dominican ancestry. At the age of 14, she left her parents' home due to her parents' transphobia, and entered foster care. She moved around frequently during this time, eventually living in all five boroughs of New York City. After being frequently bullied, Moore dropped out of high school during her sophomore year. She began working as a model at the age of 15, and eventually earned her General Equivalency Diploma.

== Career ==
=== Early work ===
Moore became a model at the age of 15, and began working shoots for Dior and Gucci, despite the fashion industry's initial treatment of her as a risky choice.

Although Moore was booking modeling jobs, she became increasingly disenchanted with the fashion industry and its emphasis on body image. Moore met ballroom dancer Jose Gutierez Xtravaganza while doing background for the television series The Get Down. He encouraged her to pursue acting and sent Moore to an audition for the independent film Saturday Church. Moore landed the role of Dijon, and the film was screened at the Tribeca Film Festival. The Hollywood Reporter called it "sweet and soulful". The film was later released on January 12, 2018, by Samuel Goldwyn Films.

In early 2017, Moore walked in New York Fashion Week and was photographed for Vogue España. That year, Moore appeared in Katy Perry's music video for the single "Swish Swish", and performed live with Perry on the May 20, 2017, episode of Saturday Night Live, where she was credited as a member of the House of Xtravaganza. In 2017, Moore was working on the short film Spot, in which she had a leading role.

=== Pose ===
In late 2017, Moore was cast in Pose, Ryan Murphy's FX television series about New York City ball culture in the late 1980s. Moore portrayed Angel Evangelista, a transgender sex worker who joins the House of Evangelista after leaving the House of Abundance with her friend Blanca, portrayed by Michaela Jaé Rodriguez. While working at the piers, she meets Stan, a yuppie played by Evan Peters, and becomes his mistress.

The series premiered on June 3, 2018. The first season boasted the largest cast of transgender actors ever for a scripted network series, with over 50 transgender characters. On July 12, 2018, it was announced that the series had been renewed for a second season, which premiered on June 11, 2019. The finale episode of the show aired in June 2021.

=== 2018 - present ===
In 2018, Moore signed a contract with IMG Models and William Morris Endeavor (WME). Moore was WME's first signed contract with a trans actor. Moore also started the production company Beetlefruit Media, which provides a platform for stories about disenfranchised groups. That year, Moore also worked on the horror television series, Magic Hour, a gender-bending recreation of Mary Shelley's Frankenstein, directed by Che Grayson and filmed in Tokyo, on which she also serve as an executive producer. The series marked the 200th anniversary of the 1818 publication of Shelley's novel

Moore has appeared in J.View's 2017 "Don't Pull Away" music video, and in Blood Orange's 2018 "Saint" video.

In May 2019, Moore became the first transgender person to be featured on the cover of the U.S. version of Elle magazine.

In December 2019, Moore debuted as the voice of Shep on the animated limited series Steven Universe Future. The character is non-binary and partner of Sadie Miller.

In 2020, Moore was cast in the psychological thriller film Escape Room: Tournament of Champions, the sequel to the 2019 film Escape Room. The film was released on July 16, 2021.

In June 2020, in honor of the 50th anniversary of the first LGBTQ Pride parade, Queerty named Moore among the fifty people "leading the nation toward equality, acceptance, and dignity for all people".

Moore voices the character Brooklyn, one of Lunella's classmates, in Moon Girl and Devil Dinosaur.

In July 2024, Moore was cast in the second season of The Sandman as Wanda, a professional driver and security agent for an exclusive travel firm who serves a guide on a road trip by the Endless to the waking world. She appears in two episodes.

== Personal life ==
Moore is transgender and uses she/her pronouns. While she previously identified as non-binary, she shared in an Instagram story on August 31, 2026, that she no longer does. Moore has spoken openly about her lifelong struggles with the bullying and transphobia that caused her to leave home at 14 and drop out of school in the 10th grade.

In an interview with Pose co-star Michaela Jaé Rodriguez, Moore discussed how, despite identifying as non-binary (at the time), being seen as a woman means she was subjected to the same "surveillance and scrutiny" as cisgender women, and to a desire to use fashion to take back that power:

MOORE: I feel like that about fashion. I feel like that about us having the autonomy to express ourselves. I'm non-binary but I don't really talk about it that much. I don't feel like people really are there yet for understanding it, which I don't mind, but I also acknowledge the way people see me as a woman. And because I'm seen as a woman, a cis woman or binary-presenting, people are going to hold me up to those same standards that women are held up to.

RODRIGUEZ: Which you're saying you shouldn't be, right?

MOORE: Which I'm saying women should not be [held up to any standards].

In December 2018, Moore came out as polyamorous.

Moore was raised as a Jehovah's Witness. In late 2024, she converted to Islam.

Moore was arrested alongside over 100 protestors at a September 2026 protest ahead of a speech by Israeli prime minister Benjamin Netanyahu at the United Nations General Assembly.

== Filmography ==
Key
†	Denotes works that have not yet been released

=== Film ===
Year	Title	Role	Notes
2017	Saturday Church	Dijon	
2017	Spot	Businesswoman	Short film
2019	Queen & Slim	Goddess	
2020	The One	Dr. Watkins	Short film
2020	Magic Hour	Bella	Short film; also executive producer
2020	A Babysitter's Guide to Monster Hunting	Peggy Drood	
2021	Escape Room: Tournament of Champions	Brianna Collier	
2023	Nimona	Alamzapam Davis (voice)	
2023	Aquaman and the Lost Kingdom	Karshon	
2024	Ponyboi	Charlie	
2025	Father Mother Sister Brother	Skye	

=== Television ===
Year	Title	Role	Notes
2018–2021	Pose	Angel Evangelista	Main role
2019	Steven Universe Future	Shep (voice)	Episode: "Little Graduation"
2023–2024	Moon Girl and Devil Dinosaur	Brooklyn (voice)	Recurring role
2025	The Sandman	Wanda	2 episodes

=== Music videos ===
Year	Title	Role	Artist
2017	"Don't Pull Away"	Lead Girl	J.Views (ft. Milosh)

== See also ==
- LGBT culture in New York City
- List of LGBT people from New York City
