= Savanah Leaf =

British-American film director (born 1993)

- Born: Savanah Grace Leaf; November 24, 1993 (age 32); London, England
- Education: San Jose State University, 2011-2012; University of Miami, 2012-2015, Psychology B.S.
- Years active: 2016–present

Savanah Leaf (born 24 November 1993) is a British-American film director and video artist. Earth Mama, her BAFTA-winning debut feature length film, was produced by A24 and Film4, and premiered at the 2023 Sundance Film Festival. Her directorial work includes the notable single-channel video run and "run002" which has exhibited at Hauser & Wirth, SFMOMA and Crystal Bridges Museum. Other work also includes music videos for Gary Clark, Jr.'s single This Land (Grammy Award for Best Music Video nominee).

Leaf is a former professional volleyball player and competed for Great Britain at the 2012 Summer Olympics.

== Early life and education ==
Leaf was born in London, and raised in Vauxhall early in life, before moving to the San Francisco Bay Area when she was age 8. She did not know her father, and was raised by her mother.

Athletically gifted, Leaf dedicated herself to basketball and volleyball throughout middle and high school. Her athletic skills and talents allowed her to commit to university as a high school sophomore and receive an athletic scholarship. She attended San Jose State University, and then transferred to the University of Miami, where she graduated with a degree in psychology while playing NCAA division 1 volleyball. Between transferring universities, Leaf represented Great Britain's national women's volleyball team in the 2012 London Olympics. Leaf later received a Masters in Drama from Central Saint Martins, at Drama Centre London. Her mother, Alison Leaf, is a set dresser and animator, who has worked at Pixar and Industrial Light and Magic.

== Career ==
=== Early Years ===
Leaf began her career out of college in professional volleyball. She played for volleyball clubs in Turkey, Puerto Rico, and France, before suffering a career-threatening injury. Deeply artistic since a young age, Leaf used her time sidelined by injury to pursue work in creative production companies. Eventually, she landed an "assistant's assistant" position at a music video and production company. Soon after, Leaf began writing and directing her own short films and directing music videos for artists such as Gary Clark Jr. and Common. Her early work began to garner critical acclaim with Gary Clark Jr. 's "This Land" and her short documentary The Heart Still Hums. It was with this aforementioned documentary that the groundwork was laid for her debut feature film, Earth Mama.

=== Earth Mama ===
Leaf's first inspirations for her debut feature film came through a reflection of the motherly figures in her community, and her own absent parent. After creating her first draft, Leaf wrote and co-directed The Heart Still Hums with Taylor Russell, which provided her with the necessary research and motivations for Earth Mama's later and final drafts.

Leaf developed her film under Film4 Productions, which co-financed Earth Mama with A24, with the latter production company handling global distribution for the film. Leaf has stated the incredible support and freedom she received in developing her debut film under these two production companies. Production occurred throughout the Bay Area in San Francisco, Oakland, Vallejo, and Treasure Island. Leaf has stated the importance of authentically representing her upbringing's environment through her story.

Her film went on to premiere at the 2023 Sundance Film Festival. It went on to receive critical acclaim upon release, with overwhelming positive reviews from film critics, and receiving distinguished awards like BAFTA's Outstanding Debut by a British Writer, Director or Producer.

Many of the actors portrayed in Leaf's film were new actors or musicians - who she praised for their work ethic - or street cast as a way to have a more accurate portrayal of the Bay Area communities Earth Mama was representing. Leaf preferred authenticity and life experiences in her actors. For example, she stated how the rapper Tia Nomore, who played the protagonist Gia, fit her character better due to Nomore's own recent pregnancy and motherhood, training as a doula, and Bay Area origins.

Leaf attributes her short-form commercial and narrative experiences in preparing her for her debut film.

=== Work after Earth Mama ===
Since her debut film, Leaf has gone on to write, direct and star in two installation films titled run and run 002, with additional performances from Willem Dafoe, and selected for display at museums like SFMOMA and Crystal Bridges Museum of American Art.

Savanah Leaf is currently signed to Park Pictures, a production company representing other acclaimed filmmakers such as Sean Wang and Emmanuel Lubezki.

== Filmography ==
=== Feature films ===
Year	Title	Director	Writer	Producer
2023	Earth Mama	Yes	Yes	Yes

=== Short films ===
Year	Title	Director	Writer	Notes
2016	F Word	Yes	Yes	Narrative, also produced
2020	The Heart Still Hums	Yes	Yes	Documentary, co-directed with Taylor Russell
2023	Run	Yes	Yes	Experimental, also starred and executive produced
2024	Run 002	Yes	Yes	Experimental, also starred and executive produced

=== Music Videos ===
Year	Title	Director	Writer	Notes	
2019	Gary Clark Jr.: This Land	Yes	—N/a		
2019	Marvin Gaye: What's Going on	Yes	—N/a	Shot Postmortem	
2019	2021	Jorja Smith: Addicted	Yes	—N/a	Co-directed with Jorja Smith

== Reception of feature films ==
Year	Film	Rotten Tomatoes	Metacritic	Budget	Box Office		
Year	Film	Rotten Tomatoes	Metacritic	Budget	North America	International	Total Worldwide
2023	Earth Mama	97% (58 reviews)	84 (24 reviews)	$2,000,000 ~ $5,000,000	n/a	$6,406	n/a

== Awards and nominations ==
Year	Title	Associations	Award	Result	Ref
2020	The Heart Still Hums	Atlanta Film Festival	Best Documentary Short	Nominated	
2020	The Heart Still Hums	Nashville Film Festival	Best Documentary Short	Won	
2020	The Heart Still Hums	Palm Springs International ShortFest	Best Documentary Short	Won	
2020	The Heart Still Hums	Blackstar Film Festival	Best Documentary Short	Won	
2020	Gary Clark Jr.: This Land	Grammy Awards	Best Music Video	Nominated	

== Bibliography ==
- Zilko, Christian (16 May 2023). "'Earth Mama' Trailer: A Single Mom Fights for Survival in Savanah Leaf's Socially Conscious Sundance Hit". IndieWire. https://www.indiewire.com/news/trailers/earth-mama-trailer-savanah-leaf-a24-sundance-1234863312/
- Erbland, Kate (6 July 2023). "How Savanah Leaf Went from Olympic Athlete to Astonishing New Filmmaker to Watch". IndieWire. https://www.indiewire.com/features/interviews/earth-mama-savanah-leaf-olympic-athlete-filmmaker-1234881645/
- Cabrera Chirinos, Christy (6 March 2024). "Creative Force: Savanah Leaf". Miami Hurricanes. https://miamihurricanes.com/news/2024/03/06/vb-feature-where-are-they-now-savanah-leaf/
- Kaufman, Anthony (16 March 2023). "New Generation: How A24 Is Helping Keep Art Films Alive". Filmmaker Magazine. https://filmmakermagazine.com/120177-new-generation-industry-beat-spring-2023/
- "How Bafta winner Savanah Leaf made one of the most striking films of awards season" (18 February 2024). Evening Standard. https://www.standard.co.uk/culture/film/bafta-awards-director-debut-savanah-leaf-film-b1139677.html
- Myers, Randy (20 July 2023). "Why former Marin resident’s feature debut, ‘Earth Mama,’ comes from deeply personal space". Marin Independent Journal. https://www.marinij.com/2023/07/20/earth-mama-how-oakland-set-movie-broke-ground-2/
- "Filmmaker Savanah Leaf's 'Earth Mama' Captures the Complex Experience of Black Motherhood". Cultured Magazine. https://www.culturedmag.com/article/2024/01/17/filmmaker-savanah-leaf-earth-mama
- "A24 Sets ‘Earth Mama,’ a Coming-of-Age Story From Director, Olympian and Grammy Nominee Savanah Leaf (EXCLUSIVE)" (31 August 2022). Variety. https://variety.com/2022/film/news/a24-earth-mama-savanah-leaf-1235355471/
