= Earth Mama =

2023 film by Savanah Leaf

- Theatrical release poster
- Directed by: Savanah Leaf
- Written by: Savanah Leaf
- Based on: The Heart Still Hums by Savanah Leaf and Taylor Russell
- Produced by: Cody Ryder; Shirley O’Connor; Medb Riordan; Sam Bisbee; Savanah Leaf
- Starring: Tia Nomore; Erika Alexander; Doechii; Sharon Duncan-Brewster; Keta Price; Olivia Luccardi; Dominic Fike; Bokeem Woodbine
- Cinematography: Jody Lee Lipes
- Edited by: George Cragg
- Music by: Kelsey Lu
- Production companies: A24; Film4; Academy Films; Park Pictures
- Distributed by: A24 (United States); We Are Parable (United Kingdom)
- Release dates: January 20, 2023 (Sundance); July 7, 2023 (United States); December 8, 2023 (United Kingdom)
- Running time: 101 minutes
- Countries: United States; United Kingdom
- Language: English
- Box office: $6,406

Earth Mama is a 2023 drama film written and directed by Savanah Leaf, based on the short film The Heart Still Hums by Leaf and Taylor Russell. It was released theatrically in the United States on July 7, 2023, by A24 and in the United Kingdom on December 8, 2023, by We Are Parable. It won the Outstanding British Debut award at the 2024 BAFTAs and was named one of the top 10 independent films of 2023 by the National Board of Review.

== Plot ==
Gia is a 24-year-old pregnant woman with two children (Trey and Shaynah) in foster care. She struggles to support herself financially and has missed child support payments. In her parenting classes, Gia remains silent. She considers giving her unborn baby up for adoption. Her friend Trina strongly objects to this, saying that it's a mother's God-given right and responsibility to raise her own children. Gia meets with potential adopters Paul and Monica (who have a daughter named Amber). During the meeting, it's revealed that Gia's aspirations to go to college were derailed with the birth of her son, and that she now has "different dreams."

Although Gia likes Paul, Monica, and Amber, she has second thoughts about putting her baby up for adoption. She has an argument with Trina, who continues to assert that a mother should be with her own children. Soon afterwards, Gia does drugs and hallucinates walking naked through a forest. Gia eventually gives birth to her baby, and is reprimanded for doing drugs while pregnant. Gia sorrowfully apologizes to her baby.

Paul and Monica adopt the baby. In court, Gia requests permission to spend more time with Trey and Shaynah. The film ends with Gia staring out into a body of water.

== Cast ==
- Tia Nomore as Gia
- Erika Alexander as Miss Carmen
- Keta Price as Mel
- Doechii as Trina
- Sharon Duncan-Brewster as Monica
- Bokeem Woodbine as Paul
- Olivia Luccardi as Alexis
- Dominic Fike as Miles

== Release ==
Earth Mama had its world premiere at the 2023 Sundance Film Festival on January 20, 2023. The film was released in the United States by A24 on July 7, 2023.

== Reception ==
=== Critical response ===
On the review aggregator website Rotten Tomatoes, 97% of 58 critics' reviews are positive, with an average rating of 7.7/10. The website's consensus reads: "Heavy yet hopeful, Earth Mama is a moving look at single motherhood on the margins that features outstanding work from writer-director Savanah Leaf and star Tia Nomore." Metacritic, which uses a weighted average, assigned the film a score of 84 out of 100, based on 24 critics, indicating "universal acclaim".

Ronda Racha Penrice of TheWrap praised the film, noting first-time director Savanah Leaf's "ability to transmit great emotional depth in small snapshots." Lovia Gyarkye of The Hollywood Reporter described it as "a quiet film, but it never once loosens its grip," and that it "operates on an intimate register, a level that speaks to its characters instead of about them."

=== Accolades ===
Award	Date of ceremony	Category	Recipient(s)	Result	Ref.
British Academy Film Awards	February 18, 2024	Outstanding Debut by a British Writer, Director or Producer	Savanah Leaf, Shirley O'Connor, Medb Riordan	Won	
British Independent Film Awards	December 3, 2023	Best Lead Performance	Tia Nomore	Nominated	
British Independent Film Awards	December 3, 2023	Best Casting	Salome Oggenfuss, Geraldine Barón, and Abby Harri	Nominated	
British Independent Film Awards	December 3, 2023	Douglas Hickox Award (Best Debut Director)	Savanah Leaf	Won	
Independent Spirit Awards	February 25, 2024	Best First Feature	Savanah Leaf	Nominated	
Independent Spirit Awards	February 25, 2024	Best Breakthrough Performance	Tia Nomore	Nominated	
National Board of Review	December 6, 2023	Top Ten Independent Films	Earth Mama	Won	
San Francisco Bay Area Film Critics Circle	January 9, 2024	Special Citation for Independent Cinema	Earth Mama	Won	
