= Anania (internet personality) =

American internet personality (born 1999 or 2000)

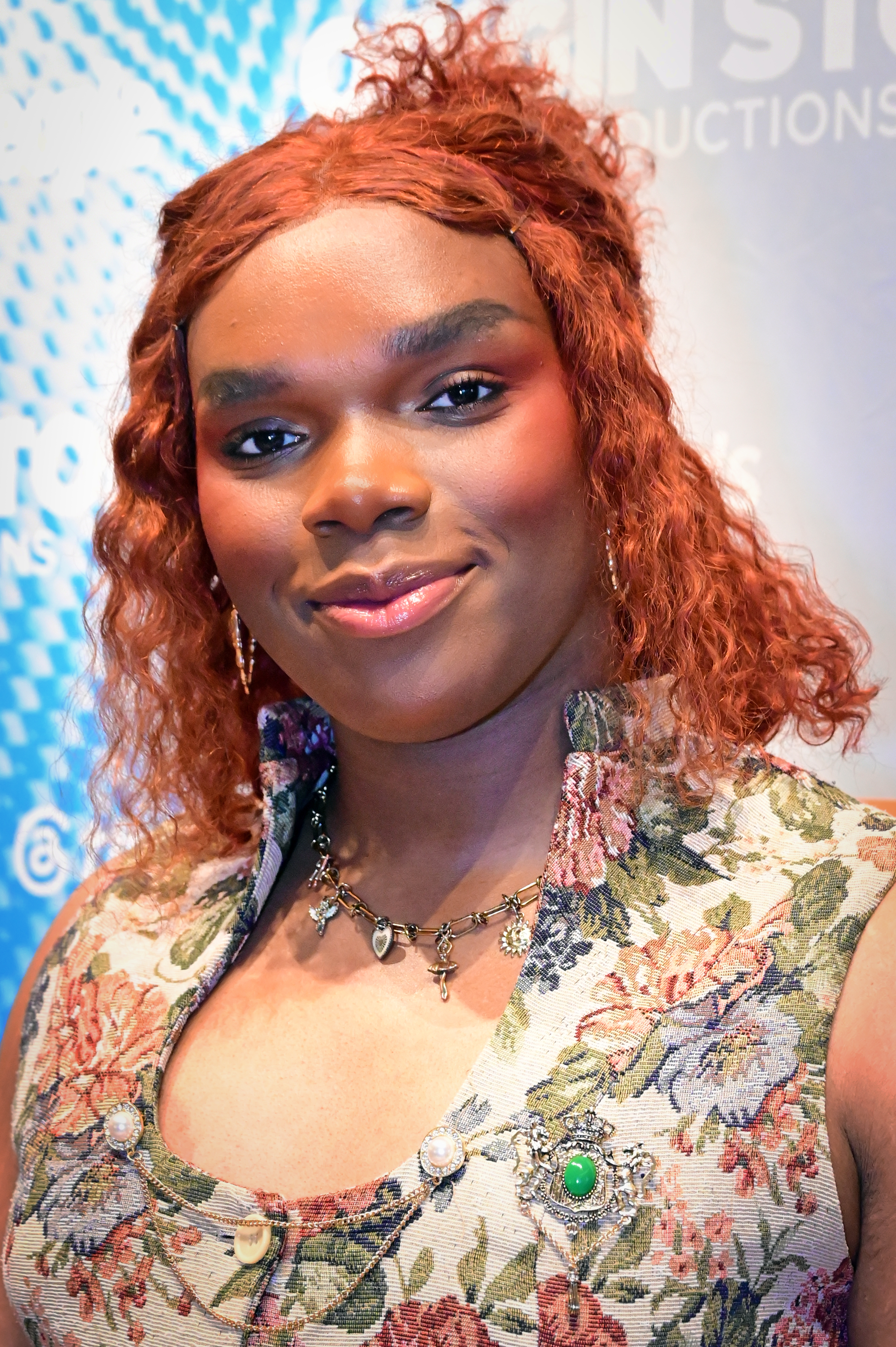
- Anania in 2026
- Born: 1999 or 2000 (age 26–27)
- Education: Emerson College (BFA)
- Occupations: Internet personality and performance artist
- Known for: Host of the online quiz show Gaydar

Instagram information
- Page: anania00
- Followers: 463 thousand (26 August 2026)

TikTok information
- Page: anania00
- Years active: 2020—present
- Followers: 2.4 million (1 December 2025)
- Website: anania00.com

Anania Williams, often known mononymously as Anania, is an internet personality, performance artist, and host of the digital quiz show Gaydar.

== Early life and education ==
Anania grew up in Davenport, Iowa. Their difficult childhood included abuse at home and bullying in school. They sang in the choir at her church as well as in show choir at Davenport Central High School. In 2022, Anania completed a Bachelor of Fine Arts in musical theater with a minor in social justice at Emerson College. Anania is genderqueer and trans and uses they/she pronouns.

== Career ==
Anania first posted on TikTok in 2020, during the COVID-19 pandemic. Their early content included posts about politics, including the Black Lives Matter protests. In their viral "Gen Z as" series, they joked about how Gen Z acts in various careers. They later began posting videos about make up and drag. As they posted more about their experience as a trans and genderqueer person, Anania was subjected to online bullying. They have stated that the harassment stems from the fact that they do not meet the standard of a "very specific, stereotypical, western, white, skinny type of trans person". In January 2023, Anania tweeted "behind every gay person is a gayer, more evil gay person". The tweet went viral and started a trend of users posting their favorite queer villain duos, such as Eve and Villanelle in Killing Eve. That year they moved to New York.

By the end of 2020, Anania had signed with a talent management company. In July 2021, Anania had about 2 million followers on TikTok; by September 2025, they had 2.4 million. Anania was recognized on the 2024 INTO "25 Under 25" list which stated: "As a Black queer influencer and drag artist, they never shy away from the difficult issues facing queer folks — but their sense of humor is top-notch, too."

=== Gaydar ===
Mutuals Media, a digital media network, recruited Anania as the host for their new show that aimed to be both funny and educational. In July 2024, the network launched Gaydar, a quiz show about queer culture. Based on guests' answers to questions, Anania attempts to guess whether they are "straight, gay or a homophobe". The show's first participants were strangers on the street in New York City, but later episodes have featured public figures such as Reneé Rapp, Lucy Dacus, and Vivian Jenna Wilson. In one episode, Anania asked Michigan governor Gretchen Whitmer about her favorite gay bars in Lansing; in another episode, they asked singer Chappell Roan about what music album "made [her] gay".

In a Gaydar episode during the 2025 New York City Democratic mayoral primary race, candidate Zohran Mamdani incorrectly guessed the meaning of the acronym "WLW" but was able to name a New York City gay bar. Anania concluded he is straight but "one of the good ones" and told their viewers to vote for him. By the time the election was held the following month, the video had gone viral, receiving 2.5 million views. The episode has been cited in articles about Mamdani's successful use of social media to market his campaign.

Gaydar is posted to social media platforms Twitter, Instagram, and YouTube and has had over 120 million views in less than a year. In June 2025, Lucy Dacus gave Anania the fictional "Women in STEM Award for Advancements in Gaydar Technology" as part of a THEM magazine project. The show was given “Special Recognition” by the GLAAD Media Awards in 2026.

== Theater ==
Anania performs in musical theater. In August 2023, they played the role of Lola in a community theater production of Kinky Boots in Chicago. One reviewer called them "magnetic". In Fall 2025, they played Heaven in a New York Theater Workshop production of Saturday Church, a musical about an outreach program for queer youth. They referred to the show as "queer, Black joy". After seeing their performance, director Sam Pinkleton cast them in his Broadway production of The Rocky Horror Show.

As a drag artist, they have opened for Chappell Roan and Bob the Drag Queen. According to Bob the Drag Queen, they are "the future of drag". Anania has referred to themself as "more than a drag queen" and instead "an actor that does drag".
