= Logan Miller =

American actor

- Born: 1991/1992 (age 34–35); Englewood, Colorado, U.S.
- Occupation: Actor
- Years active: 2008–present

Logan Miller (born 1991 or 1992) is an American actor. He is known for starring in the Disney XD sitcom I'm in the Band (2009–2011) and for voicing Sam Alexander / Nova in the animated series Ultimate Spider-Man (2012–2017) and Johnny in the Disney Channel and Disney XD animated series Phineas and Ferb (2010–2014). In films, he has starred in Scouts Guide to the Zombie Apocalypse (2015), A Dog's Purpose (2017), Love, Simon (2018), Escape Room (2019), and its sequel, Escape Room: Tournament of Champions (2021).

== Life and career ==
Miller was born in Englewood, Colorado. In 2009, he began starring as Tripp Campbell in the Disney XD sitcom I'm in the Band. He also played teenage Connor Mead, the younger version of Matthew McConaughey's character, in the 2009 film Ghosts of Girlfriends Past.

== Filmography ==
=== Film ===
Key
†	Denotes films that have not yet been released

Year	Title	Role	Notes
2009	Arthur and the Revenge of Maltazard	Jake	Voice role
2009	Ghosts of Girlfriends Past	Teenage Connor Mead	
2012	Would You Rather	Raleigh	
2013	The Bling Ring	Kid at party	
2013	Deep Powder	Crash	
2013	Night Moves	Dylan	
2013	+1	Teddy	
2015	Scouts Guide to the Zombie Apocalypse	Carter Grant	
2015	The Stanford Prison Experiment	Jerry Sherman	
2015	Take Me to the River	Ryder	
2016	The Good Neighbor	Ethan Fleming	
2017	Before I Fall	Kent McFuller	
2017	A Dog's Purpose	Todd	
2017	The Scent of Rain and Lightning	Collin Croyle	
2018	Being Frank	Philip Hansen	
2018	Love, Simon	Martin Addison	
2019	Escape Room	Ben Miller	
2019	Prey	Toby Burns	
2019	We Summon the Darkness	Kovacs	
2020	Shithouse	Sam	
2021	Escape Room: Tournament of Champions	Ben Miller	
2022	Private Property	Oates	
2024	Pavements	Mark Ibold	
2026	Psycho Killer	Marvin	
2026	Same Same but Different †	Adam	Completed

=== Television ===
Year	Title	Role	Notes
2008	The Norton Avenue All-Stars	Drew Apple	Television film
2009–2011	I'm in the Band	Tripp Campbell	Main role
2010–2014	Phineas and Ferb	Johnny	Voice
2011	I Hate My Teenage Daughter	Hunter	Episode: "Teenage Dating"
2012	Awake	Cole	3 episodes
2012	Grimm	Pierce Higgins	Episode: "The Other Side"
2012–2017	Ultimate Spider-Man	Sam Alexander / Nova, young Flash Thompson	Voice; main role
2013	Childrens Hospital	Chase McKeever	Episode: "The C-Word"
2014	Growing Up Fisher	Anthony Hooper	4 episodes
2015	Dog with a Blog	Erik	Episode: "Guess Who's a Cheater"
2016–2017	The Walking Dead	Benjamin	Recurring role (season 7)
2017–2019	Guardians of the Galaxy	Sam Alexander / Nova	Voice; recurring role
2018	It's Always Sunny in Philadelphia	Aidan	Episode: "The Gang Gets New Wheels"
2019	Veronica Mars	Simon	2 episodes
2024–2025	Chicago Med	Kip Lenox	Recurring role (season 10)
2025	Something Very Bad Is Going to Happen	Young Jay Holman	Guest star (Episode: "The Witness")

=== Video games ===
Year	Title	Role	Notes
2013	Marvel Heroes	Sam Alexander / Nova	
2014	Disney Infinity: Marvel Super Heroes	Sam Alexander / Nova	
2015	Disney Infinity 3.0	Sam Alexander / Nova	
