= Taylor Russell =

Canadian actress (born 1994)

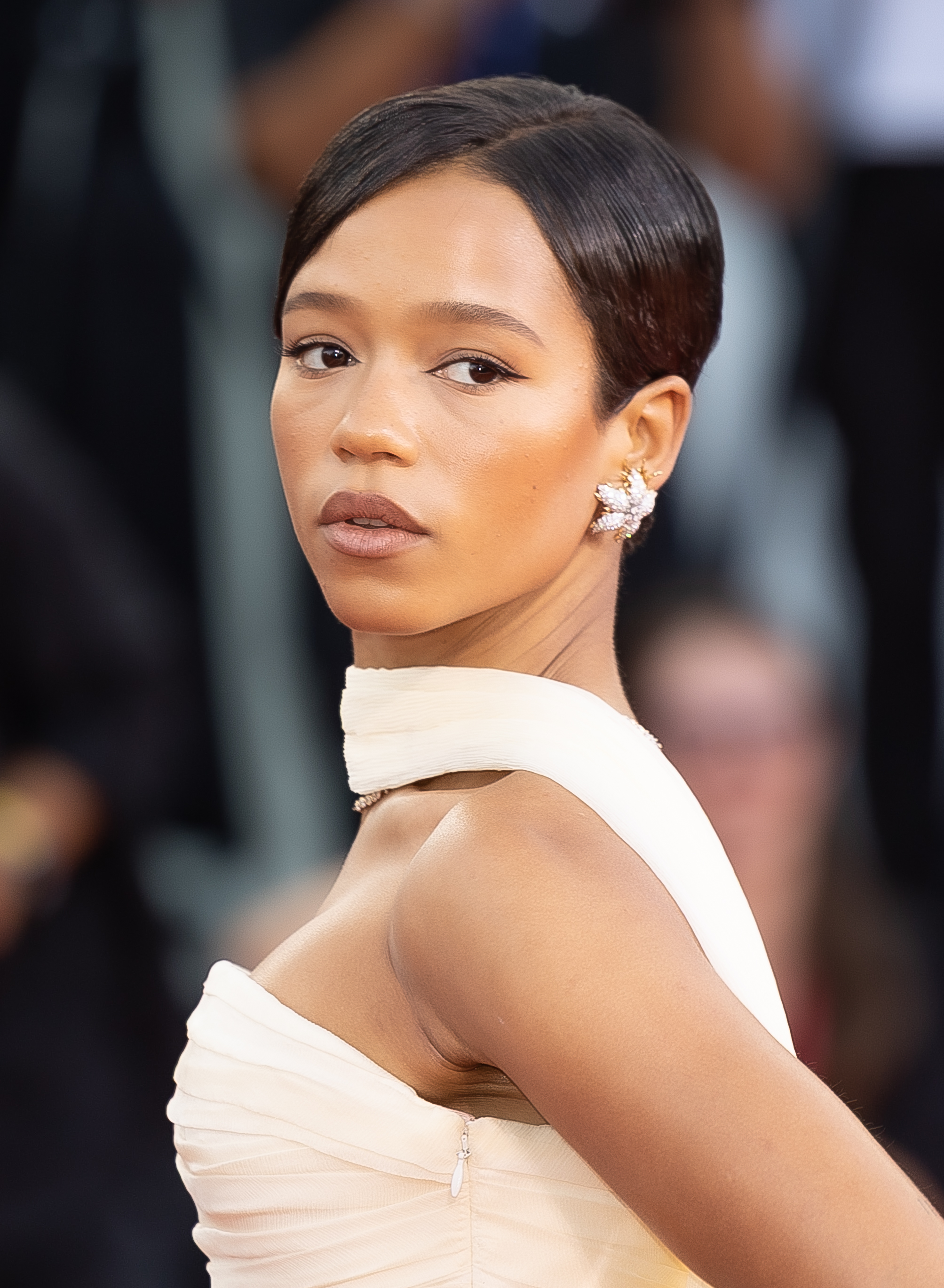
- Russell in 2024
- Born: Taylor Russell McKenzie; July 18, 1994 (age 32); Vancouver, British Columbia, Canada
- Citizenship: Canadian
- Occupation: Actress
- Years active: 2012–present

Taylor Russell McKenzie (born July 18, 1994) is a Canadian actress and filmmaker. After playing a number of minor roles, Russell received recognition for starring in the Netflix science fiction series Lost in Space (2018–2021). She rose to prominence with her roles in the drama film Waves (2019), and the horror film Escape Room (2019) and its 2021 sequel. For starring in the road movie Bones and All (2022), she won the Marcello Mastroianni Award. She performed onstage in the play The Effect from 2023 to 2024. Russell co-directed the 2020 short documentary film The Heart Still Hums, with Savanah Leaf, which was the base for a movie adaptation by Leaf titled Earth Mama (2023).

== Early life ==
Taylor Russell McKenzie was born on July 18, 1994, in the small community of Deep Cove, North Vancouver, located near Vancouver, British Columbia. Russell was raised in Vancouver, Toronto, and Montreal. She has an older brother and a younger brother. Russell, who was born to a white mother and a black father, an actor of Jamaican descent, grew up mostly with her mother's side of the family. Her father's parents were in the Windrush generation and moved from Jamaica to England. Her father lived in England until he was seven and then moved to Montreal. As a child she would visit her grandparents in Montreal, Quebec. She is from a large family on her father's side. She recalled that growing up she felt unaccepted by her peers due to the color of her skin. Her parents faced financial struggles, leading the family to rely on welfare, and they were frequently compelled to relocate, uprooting their lives a total of sixteen times to accommodate her father's professional pursuits. Russell also began working at the age of 13.

As a child, Russell was artistically inclined. She wanted to pursue a career in ballet, and later as a painter. At twelve, Russell learned to play the bass guitar. At eighteen, Russell took her first acting class, which led her to become interested in pursuing acting. She used her work savings to buy a car, and would drive to Los Angeles to audition. When money ran out, she would return home to work until she had enough earnings to audition again. Some of the jobs that Russell worked were at restaurants, a jewelry store, and a butcher's shop. This routine went on for four years until she landed her first major TV role. While living in Vancouver, she took a $15-an-hour job fulfilling orders at an Amazon warehouse. The day before her first shift, she was in a traffic accident and received an $8,000 insurance settlement for her back injury, which she used to move to Los Angeles.

== Career ==
=== 2012–2017: Rise to prominence ===
Russell made her professional acting debut in 2012, with a small guest role in an episode of The CW medical drama series Emily Owens, M.D.. In 2014, she starred as Lark Voorhies in the Lifetime television film The Unauthorized Saved by the Bell Story, and Jennifer in the Disney XD television film Pants on Fire.

Russell made guest appearances in the CBC Television drama series Strange Empire (2015), the TNT science fiction series Falling Skies (2015), and the Freeform supernatural horror series Dead of Summer (2016). She also had roles in the teen drama film Before I Fall (2017) and the supernatural horror film Down a Dark Hall (2018).

=== 2018–present: Breakthrough and acclaim ===
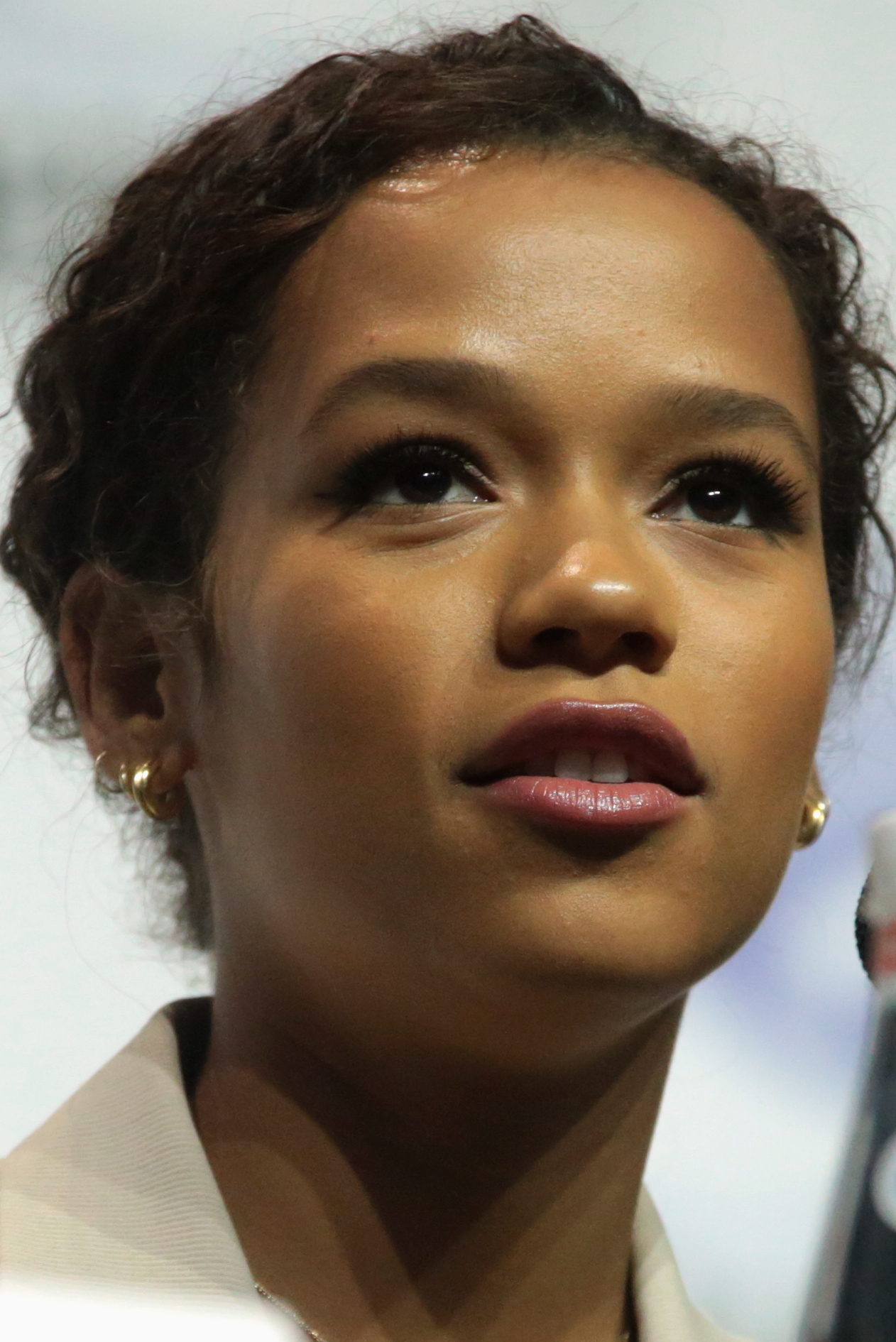
Russell at the 2018 WonderCon

In 2018, Russell earned recognition for her starring role as Judy Robinson in the science fiction series Lost in Space, a Netflix remake of the original 1965 series, for which she received critical praise and a nomination for the Saturn Award for Best Supporting Actress in a Streaming Presentation. Essence magazine stated that she "impresses in her role as a genius medic and doctor, who is compassionate and caring even in the face of danger." The series concluded in December 2021, after three seasons. On her ability to represent Black women in a science fiction series, Russell stated, "I know there are not a lot of women of color who are in the sci-fi genre and I feel really lucky that they chose me to hold that position on our show ... It holds a really big place in my heart."

In 2019, Russell had her film breakthrough with the leading role of Zoey Davis in the psychological horror film Escape Room, which was a major commercial success, surpassing initial expectations and grossing $155.7 million. Also in 2019, Russell garnered critical acclaim for her starring role in the drama film Waves, which was released by A24 on November 15, 2019. IndieWire website dubbed her performance a "revelation", going on to write that "While Waves is filled with excellent performances from its stacked cast, it's Russell that makes off with its most spectacular turn." The Los Angeles Times called her and her co-star Kelvin Harrison Jr. "two of the fastest-rising stars of their generation." For her performance in the film, Russell received the Gotham Independent Film Award for Breakthrough Performer and the Virtuoso Award at the Santa Barbara International Film Festival, among several others.

Russell starred in Thor Freudenthal's romantic drama Words on Bathroom Walls (2020), alongside Charlie Plummer, Andy Garcia, and AnnaSophia Robb, which earned positive responses both from critics and audiences. She also co-directed, wrote, and produced the documentary short film The Heart Still Hums, which earned the Palm Springs International ShortFest Award for Best Documentary Short.

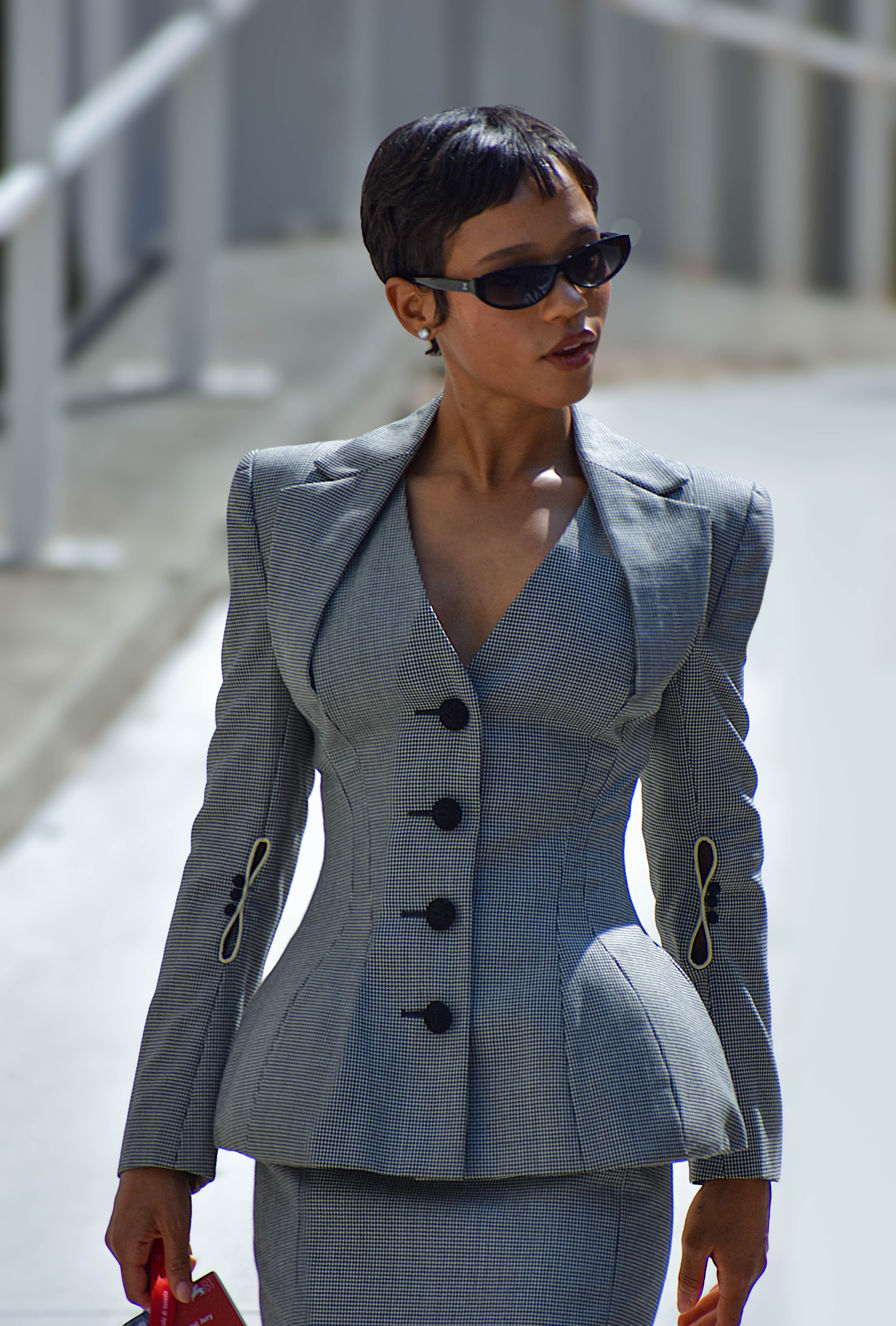
Russell at the Venice Film Festival in 2024.

In 2021, Russell starred in the comedy-drama film Dr. Bird's Advice for Sad Poets, and reprised the role of Zoey Davis in the Escape Room sequel Escape Room: Tournament of Champions, which grossed $65.8 million. Russell directed part of the music video for her Waves co-star Alexa Demie's "Leopard Limo (Archive LL11)", which also features her voice. The following year, Russell starred alongside Timothée Chalamet in the romance horror film Bones and All, directed by Luca Guadagnino. The film premiered at the 79th Venice Film Festival on September 2 to positive reviews. Russell's performance in the film earned her widespread critical acclaim and the Marcello Mastroianni Award.

In 2023, Russell began starring as Connie in the play The Effect by Lucy Prebble at the Royal National Theatre in London. The play transferred to The Shed in New York City in March 2024. The play was nominated for Best Revival at The Laurence Olivier Awards and Russell was nominated for her role at the Evening Standard Theatre Awards and the WhatsOnStage Awards.

Russell starred in the comedy film Mother, Couch opposite Ewan McGregor which premiered at the 48th Toronto International Film Festival (TIFF). She is set to appear in the thriller Hope, from director Na Hong-jin, alongside HoYeon Jung, Michael Fassbender and Alicia Vikander. In July 2024 it was announced she would join the Luigi de Laurentiis jury panel for Best First Work at the 81st edition of the Venice Film Festival.

=== The Heart Still Hums ===
The Heart Still Hums is a short documentary film directed by Russell and Savanah Leaf. It was released on June 17, 2020, by Searchlight Pictures. The film follows five woman who are victim to drug addiction, homelessness and neglect as they fight for their children. In 2021, it was adapted into a feature film adaptation titled Earth Mama that had Leaf act as writer and director.

== Media image ==
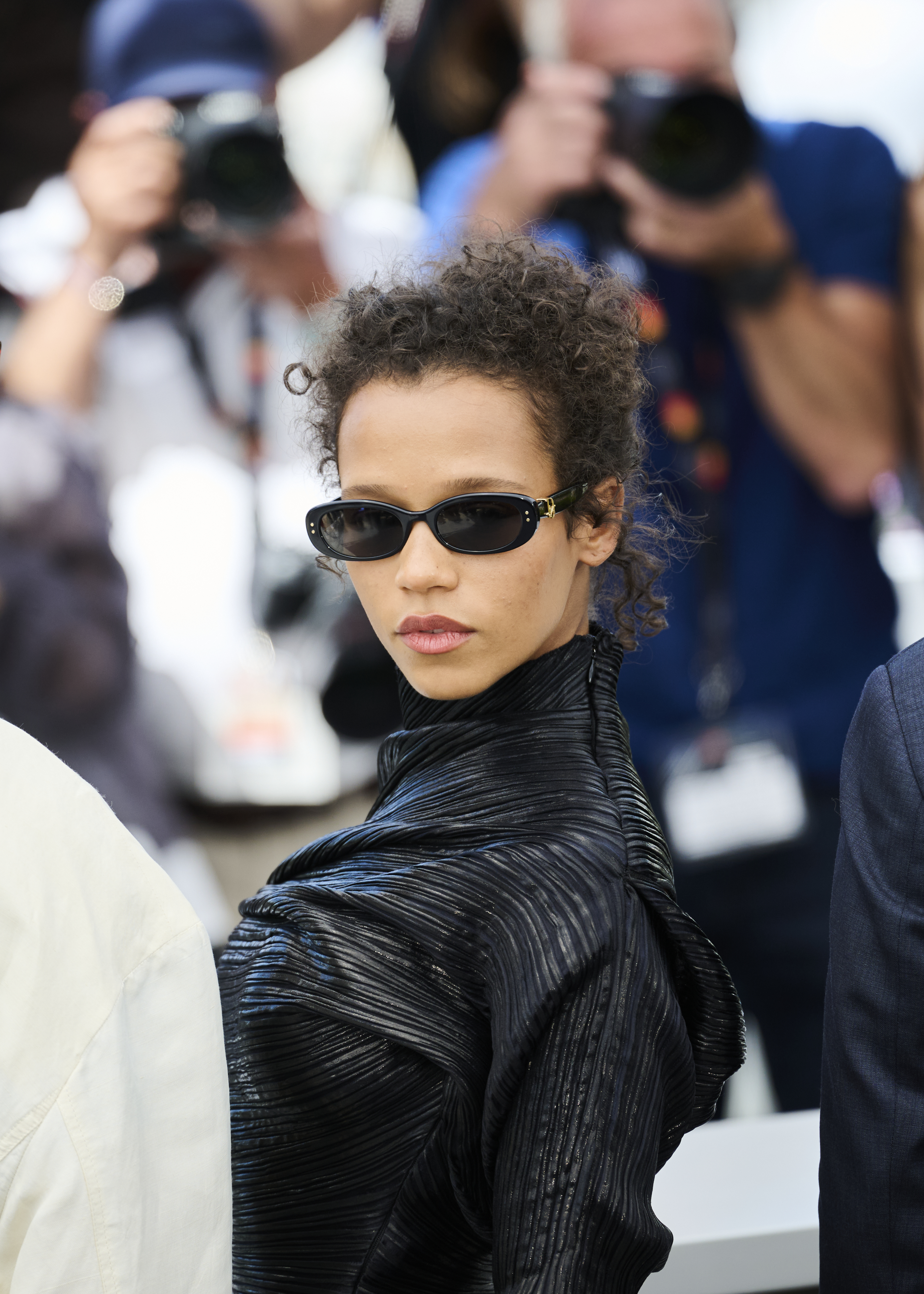
Russell at the 2026 Cannes Film Festival

Russell made her modeling debut opening the SS23 Loewe show in 2022. Creative director of the Spanish luxury brand Jonathan Anderson chose Russell after meeting her through mutual friend Luca Guadagnino. In November 2022, she was named a Loewe Global Ambassador. Russell has modeled in campaigns for Loewe, Chanel, BYRDIE, and Prada. Russell was on the cover of Vogue for the first time in the March 2024 issue of Vogue Italia by Paolo Roversi. Russell made her Met Gala debut in 2024 as part of the Sleeping Beauties: Reawakening Fashion exhibition. Speaking to Vogue, Russell was labelled a muse for Jonathan Anderson.

== Personal life ==
Russell currently lives between New York and London. She is a fan of Patti Smith and has a small lightning bolt tattooed on her inner wrist, emulating the one Smith has on her knee. She called Smith "one of her heroes" and has read Smith's memoir Just Kids around 10 times. Russell is trained in ballet and dances for 15 minutes every morning after waking up. Her favorite book is By Grand Central Station I Sat Down and Wept by Elizabeth Smart. From June 2023 to May 2024, Russell dated English singer Harry Styles.

== Filmography ==
=== Film ===
Year	Title	Role	Notes
2013	If I Had Wings	Amy Conrad	Credited as Taylor Russell McKenzie
2015	Suspension	Carrie	
2016	UNIT Bryan	Robin	Short film
2017	Before I Fall	Ashley	
2018	Down a Dark Hall	Ashley	
2018	Hot Air	Tess	
2019	Escape Room	Zoey Davis	
2019	Waves	Emily Williams	
2020	Words on Bathroom Walls	Maya Arnez	
2021	Dr. Bird's Advice for Sad Poets	Sophie	
2021	Escape Room: Tournament of Champions	Zoey Davis	
2022	Bones and All	Maren Yearly	
2023	Mother, Couch	Bella	
2026	Hope	Ai'dovor	
TBA	The Origin of the World	TBA	

=== Television ===
Year	Title	Role	Notes
2012	Emily Owens, M.D.	Mean Girl #1	Episode: "Emily and... the Outbreak"; Credited as Taylor McKenzie
2013	Blink	Jessica	Television pilot
2014	The Unauthorized Saved by the Bell Story	Lark Voorhies	Television film
2014	Pants on Fire	Jennifer	Television film
2015	Strange Empire	Cassie	2 episodes
2015	Falling Skies	Evelyn	5 episodes
2016	Dead of Summer	Laura	Episode: "How to Stay Alive in the Woods"
2017	Sea Change	CeCe	Television film
2018–2021	Lost in Space	Judy Robinson	Main role; 28 episodes

=== Theater ===
Year	Title	Role	Playwright	Venue
2023	The Effect	Connie	Lucy Prebble	Lyttelton Theatre, London
2024	The Effect	Connie	Lucy Prebble	The Shed, Off-Broadway

=== Filmmaking credits ===
Year	Title	Director	Writer	Producer	Notes
2020	The Heart Still Hums	Yes	Yes	Yes	Short film
2021	"Leopard Limo (Archive LL11)"	Yes	No	No	Music video for Alexa Demie

== Awards and nominations ==
Year	Award	Category	Work	Result	Ref.
2019	Saturn Award	Best Supporting Actress in a Streaming Presentation	Lost in Space	Nominated	
2019	African-American Film Critics Association	We See You Award	Waves	Won	
2019	Chicago Film Critics Association	Most Promising Performer	Waves	Nominated	
2019	Gotham Independent Film Award	Breakthrough Actor	Waves	Won	
2019	Indiana Film Journalists Association	Breakout of the Year	Waves	Nominated	
2019	Indiana Film Journalists Association	Best Supporting Actress	Waves	Nominated	
2020	Black Reel Award	Outstanding Breakthrough Performance, Female	Waves	Nominated	
2020	Black Reel Award	Outstanding Supporting Actress	Waves	Nominated	
2020	Independent Spirit Award	Best Supporting Female	Waves	Nominated	
2020	Georgia Film Critics Association	Breakthrough Award	Escape Room and Waves	Nominated	
2020	Hollywood Critics Association	Star on the Rise	Waves	Won	
2020	Hollywood Critics Association	Best Supporting Actress	Waves	Nominated	
2020	Hollywood Critics Association	Breakthrough Performance - Actress	Waves	Nominated	
2020	Latino Entertainment Journalists Association	Best Supporting Actress	Waves	Nominated	
2020	Santa Barbara International Film Festival	Virtuoso Award	Waves	Won	
2020	Seattle Film Critics Society	Best Supporting Actress	Waves	Nominated	
2020	Atlanta Film Festival	Best Documentary Short	The Heart Still Hums	Nominated	
2020	BlackStar Film Festival	Best Documentary Short	The Heart Still Hums	Won	
2020	Nashville Film Festival	Best Documentary Short	The Heart Still Hums	Won	
2020	Palm Springs International ShortFest	Best Documentary Short	The Heart Still Hums	Won	
2022	Venice Film Festival	Marcello Mastroianni Award	Bones and All	Won	
2022	Gotham Independent Film Awards	Outstanding Lead Performance	Bones and All	Nominated	
2022	Independent Spirit Awards	Best Lead Performance	Bones and All	Nominated	
2023	Evening Standard Theatre Awards	Emerging Talent	The Effect	Nominated	
2023	WhatsOnStage Awards	Best Performer in a Play	The Effect	Nominated	
