= Jay Ellis =

American actor (born 1981)

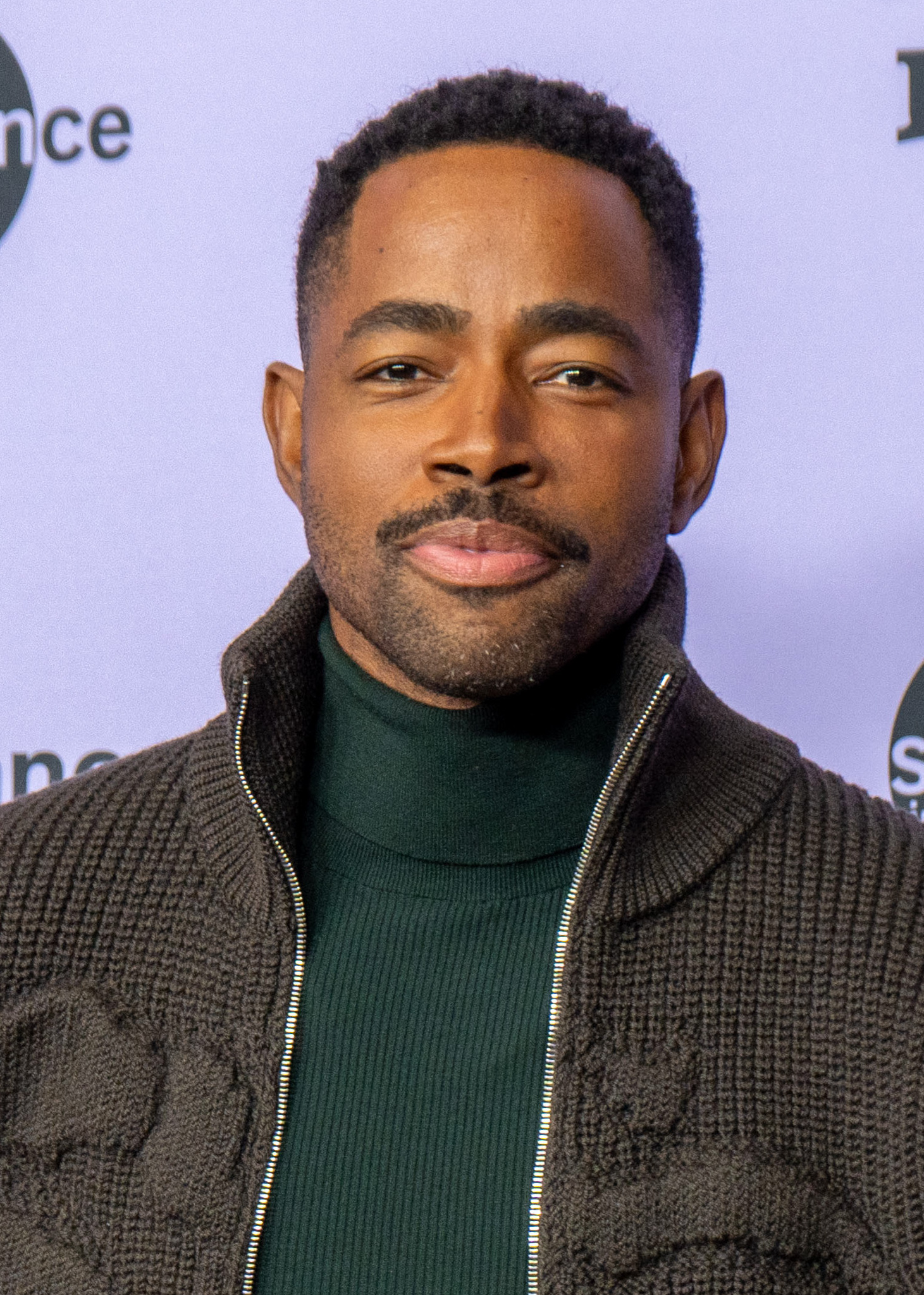
- Ellis in 2024
- Born: Wendell Ramone Ellis Jr. December 27, 1981 (age 44); Sumter, South Carolina, U.S.
- Education: Concordia University
- Occupation: Actor
- Years active: 2005–present
- Spouse: Nina Seničar (m. 2022)
- Children: 2

Wendell Ramone "Jay" Ellis Jr. (born December 27, 1981) is an American actor. In 2013, Ellis received his first major role on BET's series The Game. His role as Martin "Lawrence" Walker in the HBO series Insecure (2016–2021), earned him an NAACP Image Award for Outstanding Actor in a Comedy Series. He later starred in the horror film Escape Room (2019) and appeared in Top Gun: Maverick (2022).

== Early life and education ==
Ellis was born in Sumter, South Carolina. His father, Wendell Ramone Ellis Sr., worked for the Air Force, while his mother, Paula Bryant-Ellis, worked as a chief financial officer. He is the only child of the family. He went to 12 schools in 13 years before graduating from Concordia University in Oregon with a degree in finance.

== Career ==
Ellis worked as a public relations intern for the Portland Trail Blazers during their infamous "Jail Blazers" era. Ellis also served with AmeriCorps, volunteering with students in Portland, Oregon. Later, Ellis switched his focus to modeling and started working with Portland-based sportswear companies such as Nike, Adidas and Columbia Sportswear.

=== Acting ===
In 2004, Ellis moved to Los Angeles to focus on his acting career. He launched his career as a professional actor in 2005, when he appeared briefly in single episodes of the television series Invasion and Related. In 2011–2012, he made appearances on the series Grey's Anatomy, NCIS and How I Met Your Mother.

His first major acting role was in 2013, starring in BET's series The Game. In August 2015, it was announced that Ellis has joined the cast of HBO's comedy series Insecure, which premiered in October 2016. He plays the role of Lawrence Walker, who has a long-term relationship with main character Issa Dee played by Issa Rae. For his work on the show, Ellis received the Outstanding Supporting Actor in a Comedy Series award at the 49th NAACP Image Awards.

He starred as Reuben "Payback" Fitch in Top Gun: Maverick.

Ellis will star in The Rookie: North, a spin-off of the ABC police drama The Rookie. Ellis will play the lead role of Alex Holland, a middle-aged man who becomes the Pierce County Police Department's oldest rookie officer.

=== The Untold Story: Policing ===
In 2020, Ellis started hosting The Untold Story: Policing, a four-part podcast series co-produced by Campaign Zero and Lemonada Media. Through interviews with academics, data scientists, and community organizers, the podcast demystifies police union contracts and investigates how they contribute to violent police misconduct across the United States. Ellis serves as the series’ host, as well as an executive producer alongside DeRay Mckesson, Stephanie Wittels Wachs, and Jessica Cordova Kramer.

== Philanthropy ==
In 2017, Ellis partnered with leading HIV/AIDS research organization, amfAR.

== Personal life ==
Ellis has been in a relationship with Serbian model and actress Nina Seničar since 2015. Their daughter was born in November 2019. On July 9, 2022, they married in Italy. Their son was born in July 2024.

== Filmography ==
=== Film ===
Year	Title	Role	Notes
2010	Triple Standard	Lewis	Short film
2011	Hatched: A Tale of Great Egg-spectations	Jay	Short film
2012	Election Eve	Jeff	Short film
2013	Movie 43	Lucious	Segment: "Victory's Glory"
2014	Mass Shooting News Team	Unknown	Short film
2014	The Black Bachelor	Unknown	Short film
2015	My Favorite Five	Jonathan Colburn	
2015	November Rule	James Avedon	
2015	Breaking Through	Quinn	
2015	Twelve Steps	Ray	Short film
2016	Like Cotton Twines	Micha Brown	
2016	Shortwave	Robert	
2018	In a Relationship	Dexter	
2019	Escape Room	Jason Walker	
2020	Thirsty	The Young Man	Short film
2021	Escape Room: Tournament of Champions	Flashback - Jason Walker	
2022	Top Gun: Maverick	Lieutenant Reuben "Payback" Fitch	
2023	Somebody I Used to Know	Sean	
2024	Freaky Tales	Sleepy Floyd	
2024	The Gutter	"Lil Patience"	Comedy
2026	One Night Only	Bernard Starks	

=== Television ===
Year	Title	Role	Notes
2005	Invasion	Soldier (uncredited)	Episode: "Watershed"
2005	Related	College Student	Episode: "Hang in There, Baby"
2010	The Bold and the Beautiful	Orderly	Episode: "Episode #1.5922"
2011	Grey's Anatomy	D.J.	Episode: "White Wedding"
2011	NCIS	Marine PFC Thomas "Tommy" Hill	Episode: "Restless"
2011	Let's Do This!	Ugandan Thug #1 / Ceiling Mop Ugandan	TV movie
2012	How I Met Your Mother	Sound Guy	Episode: "Tailgate"
2012	Hart of Dixie	Resident	Episode: "Heart to Hart"
2012	iCarly	Friend #1	Episode: "iFind Spencer Friends"
2012	Crash & Bernstein	Derek	Episode: "Coach Crash"
2013	Dear Secret Santa	Brad	TV movie
2013–2015	The Game	Bryce "Blueprint" Westbrook	Main, 45 episodes
2013	NCIS: Los Angeles	Naval Flight Officer Randall Baker	Episode: "Purity"
2014	Masters of Sex	Dr. Cyril Franklin	Episode: "Giants"
2016	Grace and Frankie	Dan	Episode: "The Anchor"
2016–2021	Insecure	Martin "Lawrence" Walker	Main (seasons 1–2, 4–5); guest (season 3)
2020	Mrs. America	Franklin Thomas	Recurring role
2022–Present	How Did They Build That?	Self	Narrator
2023	History of the World, Part II	Jesus Christ	Recurring role
2025–Present	Running Point	Jay Brown	Recurring role
2025	All Her Fault	Colin	Main role
2026	Not Suitable for Work	Bill Gibson	Main role
2027	The Rookie: North	Alex Holland	Main role

=== Producer ===
Year	Title	Notes
2020	Black Box	Feature film

== Awards and nominations ==
Year	Awards	Category	Nominated work	Result
2017	Black Reel Awards for Television	Outstanding Supporting Actor, Comedy Series	Insecure	Nominated
2018	NAACP Image Awards	Outstanding Supporting Actor in a Comedy Series	Insecure	Won
