= Tia Nomore =

American actress

- Born: Oakland, California, U.S.
- Occupations: Actress, rapper
- Years active: 2015–present

Tia Nomore is an American actress and rapper. She is known for her debut leading role in the 2023 drama film, Earth Mama, for which she received positive reviews from critics and British Independent Film Awards and Independent Spirit Awards nominations.

== Life and career ==
Nomore was born and raised in Oakland, California and began performing on local music stage. She released two studio albums under the local label Text Me Records: Gooney Tunes (2018) and Level (2019).

In 2023, Nomore starred in the 2023 independent drama film Earth Mama, directed and written by Savanah Leaf. The film premiered at the 2023 Sundance Film Festival on January 20, 2023, and later was released in theatres by A24 on July 7, 2023. Nomore received widespread acclaim for her debut performance. Kate Stables from the BFI wrote: "Nomore, a rapper in her first acting role (she’s one of several fine non-actors here, including the Florida rapper Doechii as garrulous friend Trina) gives a subtle, sullen, and commendably understated performance that’s one of the film’s chief joys. She creates a believably tetchy low-key realism in Gia’s guarded friendships, and a yearning stillness in the film’s interludes of solitary disassociation, where the sheer pain of living makes Gia repeatedly dream of herself naked and peacefully pregnant, in the towering California redwood forest that is her mental refuge." For her performance, Nomore received Black Film Critics Circle Rising Star Award, as well British Independent Film Award for Best Lead Performance, Independent Spirit Award for Best Breakthrough Performance and Black Reel Award for Outstanding Breakthrough Performance nominations.

== Filmography ==
Year	Title	Role	Notes
2023	Earth Mama	Gia Wilson	Black Film Critics Circle Award Rising Star Award; Nominated — British Independent Film Award for Best Lead Performance; Nominated — Independent Spirit Award for Best Breakthrough Performance; Nominated — Black Reel Award for Outstanding Breakthrough Performance

== Discography ==
- Gooney Tunes (2018)
- Level (2019)
- A Soulful Christmas (with Faye Carol), (2026)
