= Escape Room: Tournament of Champions =

2021 American psychological horror film

- Theatrical release poster
- Directed by: Adam Robitel
- Screenplay by: Will Honley; Maria Melnik; Daniel Tuch; Oren Uziel
- Story by: Christine Lavaf; Fritz Bohm
- Based on: Characters by Bragi F. Schut
- Produced by: Neal H. Moritz
- Starring: Taylor Russell; Logan Miller
- Cinematography: Marc Spicer
- Edited by: Steven Mirkovich; Peter Pav
- Music by: Brian Tyler; John Carey
- Production companies: Columbia Pictures; Original Film
- Distributed by: Sony Pictures Releasing
- Release dates: July 1, 2021 (Australia); July 16, 2021 (United States)
- Running time: 88 minutes
- Country: United States
- Language: English
- Budget: $15 million
- Box office: $65.8 million

Escape Room: Tournament of Champions (released in some markets as Escape Room: No Way Out and Escape Room 2: Deadly Game) is a 2021 American survival horror film directed by Adam Robitel and written by Will Honley, Maria Melnik, Daniel Tuch, and Oren Uziel. A sequel to 2019's Escape Room, it stars Taylor Russell, Logan Miller, and Deborah Ann Woll reprising their roles from the first film, alongside new cast members Indya Moore, Holland Roden, Thomas Cocquerel, and Carlito Olivero, and follows a group of six people trying to survive a new series of more deadly escape rooms.

After the first film became a surprise hit in 2019, Columbia Pictures approved a sequel. Robitel returned as the director with Melnik writing the script, and Russell and Miller reprised their roles alongside the addition of new cast members. Filming took place in Cape Town, South Africa, from November 2019 to January 2020, with additional filming in January 2021.

Escape Room: Tournament of Champions was theatrically released in Australia on July 1, 2021, and in the United States on July 16, by Sony Pictures Releasing, following several delays due to the COVID-19 pandemic. The film grossed $66 million and received mixed reviews from critics, who praised its cast, atmosphere, and elaborate puzzles, but noted the film's failure to improve upon its predecessor. An "extended cut" version was released the following October 5, featuring a different opening and ending, as well as large differences in the story and characters featured; Woll is notably completely absent from the new version, while Isabelle Fuhrman and James Frain both appear as new key characters.

== Plot ==
After escaping the "sole survivor" escape rooms orchestrated by the Minos Corporation, Zoey Davis convinces Ben Miller to confront the shadowy organization after finding coordinates to its New York City–based headquarters. Zoey is encouraged by her therapist to move on from her trauma and get over her aerophobia, but she opts to drive with Ben instead of flying.

The pair find the headquarters derelict and are accosted by a vagrant, who steals Zoey's necklace. She and Ben give chase straight into the Q subway train. Their train car separates from the rest of the train and is redirected to a remote station, sealing Zoey, Ben, and other passengers Rachel, Brianna, Nathan, and Theo inside.

As the passengers realize in horror that they are once again in Minos's deadly game, the train becomes electrified. Zoey and Ben learn that the others are the "winners" of previous escape rooms, having survived them. To escape, the group must collect subway tokens as the electrification increases. Theo is electrocuted when he is knocked into a pole, but the rest escape. Nathan reveals his escape room group were all priests, Brianna's were all influencers, and Rachel's consisted of people who cannot feel physical pain.

The next room is a bank with a slowly closing vault and a deadly laser security system. The group manages to decipher the complex route to get around the lasers and escape with just seconds to spare. While in the room, Zoey is perplexed by frequent references to someone called Sonya and that the escape rooms have no apparent connection to the group, unlike before.

The next room is a postcard-like beach with more references to Sonya. They discover that the beach is covered in quicksand. While Rachel is sinking, Nathan sacrifices himself to save her and is swallowed up by the sand.

Zoey finds an alternate route out just as Brianna unlocks the intended exit. An argument on which route to take breaks out; Rachel and Ben side with Zoey. Brianna escapes through the main exit while Rachel and Zoey traverse to the alternate route, but Ben falls into the quicksand, devastating Zoey.

Zoey and Rachel make their way out through a manhole back into the city. Overjoyed at first that they are outside, they quickly realize they are still in the game when they encounter a panicked Brianna. If they do not make it out of this room, acid rain is periodically sprayed on them. The group collects the acid to enter a phone booth for protection, but there is not enough room for everyone, and Zoey is forced to use an umbrella to shield herself from the rain. She discovers the final clue, leading them to a taxi to escape into but once Zoey enters, the taxi door automatically closes and locks Rachel and Brianna out. Zoey falls into the next room while Rachel and Brianna are killed by the acid rain.

The next room is a child's bedroom containing a diary from Sonya, revealing rooms are based on a fun day out she had with her mother. Zoey discovers Sonya's mother is Amanda Harper, who survived her fall in her original escape room (Note: As depicted in Escape Room) and was forced into designing escape rooms for Minos after they abducted her daughter.

Amanda appears and begs Zoey to become the next puzzle-maker for Minos, warning that she has no choice. Ben is revealed to be trapped in a glass case. When Zoey refuses Minos's demand, Ben's case starts filling with water, but Zoey and Amanda work together to free him.

They manage to break out, fleeing the facility. They report their findings to the police, who retrieve the bodies of Rachel, Brianna, Nathan, and Theo; the news about Minos goes public. An FBI agent assures Zoey that Minos will be tracked down.

Filled with confidence, Zoey decides to take a plane home with Ben. On board, she sees a woman who resembles her therapist, and then realizes they are in another escape room. The distorted voice of Minos's leader mocks Zoey and Ben for falling into their latest trap as the plane begins to fall and gas fills the cabin.

== Cast ==
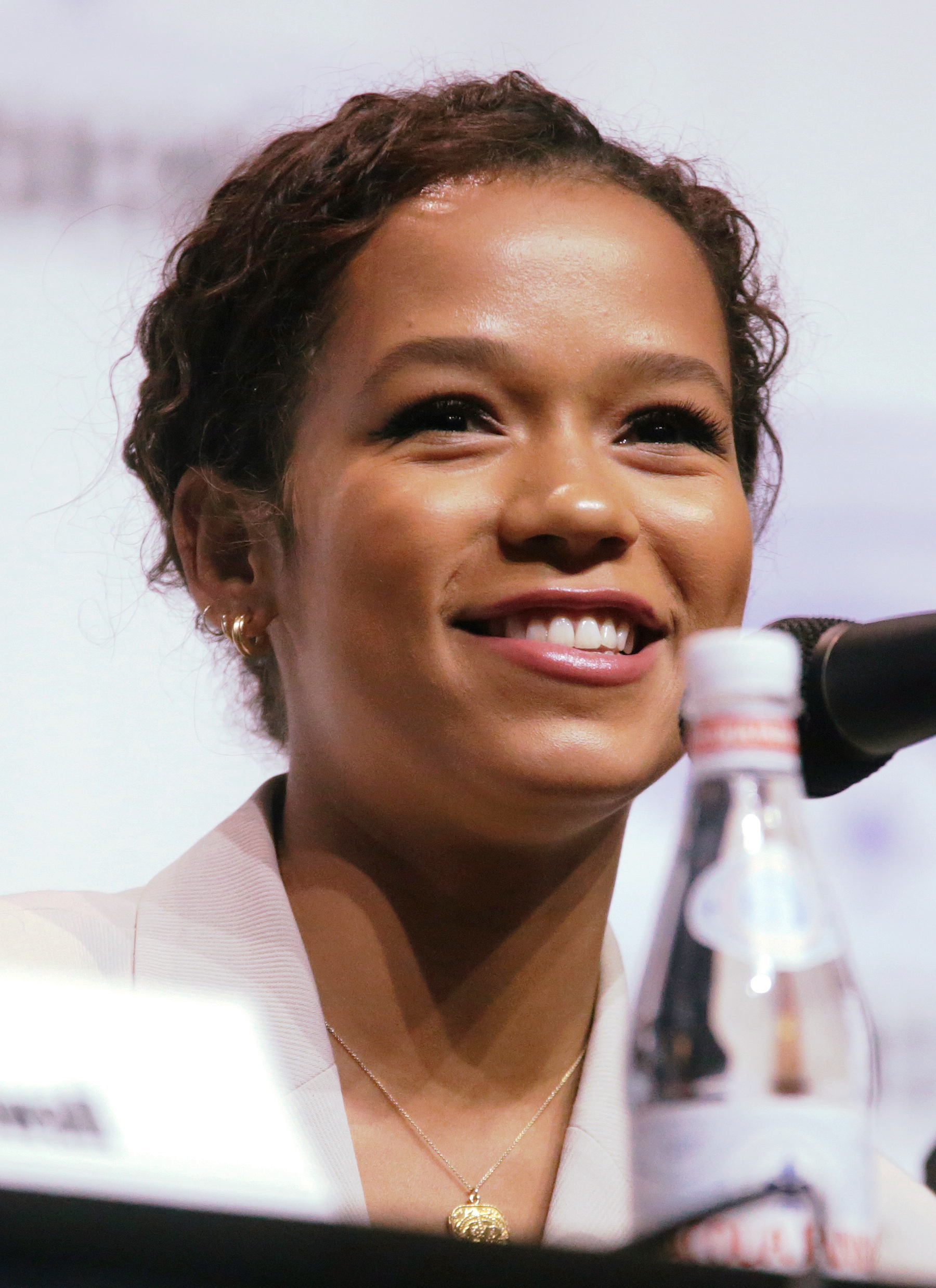
Taylor Russell, one of the leads of the film

- Taylor Russell as Zoey Davis
- Logan Miller as Ben Miller
- Deborah Ann Woll (Note: Woll only appears in the theatrical cut, with her character being absent in the alternate version.) as Amanda Harper
- Holland Roden as Rachel Ellis
- Indya Moore as Brianna Collier
- Thomas Cocquerel as Nathan
- Carlito Olivero as Theo

Isabelle Fuhrman and James Frain appear in the film's alternate version as Claire and Henry, respectively, in a plotline revealing the puzzle maker's story. Tanya van Graan makes an uncredited appearance as Sonya, who is Henry's wife and Claire's mother in this cut.

Additionally, Lucy Newman-Williams appears as Zoey's therapist and Scott Coker portrays an FBI agent in the theatrical cut. Matt Esof portrays the vagrant who lures Zoey and Ben into Minos's trap in both versions.

Jay Ellis, Tyler Labine, and Nik Dodani also appear as Jason Walker, Mike Nolan, and Danny Khan in flashbacks of the first film.

== Production ==
=== Development ===
In February 2019, a sequel to Escape Room was announced as being in active development, with Adam Robitel set to return to direct along with screenwriter Bragi F. Schut and producer Neal H. Moritz.

In April 2019, Robitel stated in an interview with Bloody Disgusting that one of the challenges the production team faced in its development was to figure out how to design new escape rooms that would outdo those the original film featured. He said:

We did fire, gravity, ice, cold, gas so we need to outdo ourselves now. We're in the box. I can't draw and quarter somebody, so what are those visual ticking clocks? We have some cool stuff we're developing and hopefully, the audience will think that way too, but it's tougher.

He continued, "We're knee deep in developing the sequel. We're exploring various ideas with how it all plays out."

He intended the first film's final scene, which depicted an escape room disguised as a hijacked airplane, to suggest that Minos, the organization behind the deadly escape rooms, may be more powerful, sinister and given to surveilling than previously thought, which he planned to expand upon in the sequel. He said:

I think the implication is that Minos is far more widespread in the halls of power in our society than we realize. [. . .] I think we're in a time of real paranoia, whether it's institutions or the police state. We've never been in a time of such divisiveness as a culture, so we always love the idea.

The film's official title, Escape Room: Tournament of Champions, was announced in a press conference on May 20, 2021.

=== Casting ===
In October 2019, Collider reported that Isabelle Fuhrman had joined the cast, alongside returning cast members Taylor Russell and Logan Miller. Later that month, Holland Roden, Thomas Cocquerel, Indya Moore, and Carlito Olivero also joined the cast.

== Release ==
=== Theatrical ===
The film was originally scheduled to be released on April 17, 2020. Its release date was subsequently changed several times, and in May 2020, it was scheduled to be released on January 1, 2021. In October 2020, Sony moved the film to sometime later in 2021. In January 2021, it was announced that the film's release date would be pushed back again, to January 7, 2022. The film was later moved up to July 16, 2021. The film was first released in Australia on July 1, 2021.

=== Streaming ===
When asked about whether the film would also be available to stream at the same time it was released to theaters to accommodate those uncertain of the safety of in-theater attendance due to the COVID-19 pandemic, Robitel stated that the film will pursue a standard theatrical release with no streaming alternative because he believes that the darkness of the standard theater room would allow the film to be at its most frightening and thrilling.

=== Home media ===
Escape Room: Tournament of Champions was released digitally on September 21 and was released on Blu-ray and DVD on October 5, 2021, by Sony Pictures Home Entertainment. The video edition will contain an extended and alternative version of the film with a new plot and characters and a different ending.

==== Extended cut ====
Prior to release, the extended cut of the film was reported to feature 25 minutes of new footage; however, upon release it was discovered that the runtime of the film was only six minutes longer than the theatrical cut. The extended version of the film largely reshapes the plot of the film, entirely removing Deborah Ann Woll's character from the film. Isabelle Fuhrman and James Frain instead appear as Claire and Henry, respectively, who reveal more about Minos's inner workings behind the scenes. This large change in narrative has led critics to wonder how future installments of the franchise will be affected by these "incompatible" plotlines.

==== Extended cut opening and ending ====
In the extended cut, the film opens with Henry, revealed to be a designer of the escape rooms. When his wife Sonya threatens to divorce him and take their daughter Claire with her, she ends up trapped in the sauna when it turns into an escape room. However, she does not solve it in time to escape and eventually dies from the extreme temperatures.

Later in the film, when there is a malfunction during the Acid Rain room's transition, Zoey is taken to a department of Minos where she meets Claire, who turns out to be the actual puzzle maker. Claire has been locked up in a room by her father, who is one of the higher-ups in Minos and who has forced her to create elaborate escape rooms after which he has taken all of the credit. Claire begs Zoey to help her get out of the room. Up until that point Zoey has been hesitant, until it is revealed Ben has been saved by Claire who created a secret compartment under the quicksand for him to fall into. However, Ben is found by Henry's men and thrown into the final room: a sauna. With Zoey's help Claire manages to break out and is then met by her father. Zoey and Claire succeed in fighting Claire's father off and they save Ben. Claire locks the Minos employees inside the control room, and suggests Zoey report her findings to the police.

After Zoey escapes to the original location where she finds Ben in an ambulance, it is revealed that Claire was the mastermind all along. When she was younger, she tried to be as bad as possible in an attempt to see if her parents truly loved her as she is. When her mother Sonya said that she was getting her help by sending her away, Claire murdered her in the sauna. Claire ultimately traps her father in her old room and kills him.

== Reception ==
=== Box office ===
Escape Room: Tournament of Champions grossed $25.3 million in the United States and Canada, and $40.7 million in other territories, for a worldwide total of $66 million.

In the United States and Canada, the film was released alongside Space Jam: A New Legacy, Pig, and Roadrunner: A Film About Anthony Bourdain, and was projected to gross $7–10 million from 2,775 theaters in its opening weekend. The film made $3.8 million on its first day, including $1.2 million from Thursday night previews. It went on to debut to $8.8 million, finishing third at the box office. It fell 60 percent in its second weekend to $3.5 million, finishing sixth.

=== Critical response ===
On Rotten Tomatoes, the film holds an approval rating of 52% based on 79 reviews, with an average rating of 5.4/10. The website's critics consensus reads, "Escape Room: Tournament of Champions may appeal to fans of the original who've been hoping for a sequel, but its increasingly convoluted rules add up to a very unpleasant game night." On Metacritic, the film holds a weighted average score of 48 out of 100 based on review from 17 critics, indicating "mixed or average" reviews. Audiences polled by CinemaScore gave the film an average grade of "B" on an A+ to F scale, the same as the first film, while PostTrak reported 69% of audience members gave it a positive score, with 44% saying they would definitely recommend it.

William Bibbiani of the TheWrap wrote: "Make no mistake: Escape Room: Tournament of Champions may be fun, it's also incredibly stupid. The premise makes no sense. The mechanics make no sense. The plot makes no sense. Look elsewhere for storytelling sanity. Look here if you want to see confident, creepy absurdity, with a ghoulish imagination and showmanship to spare."

Jesse Hassenger of The A.V. Club gave the film a "C+", writing: "After 30 or 40 minutes, it becomes clear that, despite a few more callbacks, this is a more-of-the-same sequel, not a next-level sequel." From The Hollywood Reporter, John DeFore called the film an "underwhelming attempt to turn a tight little thriller into a sequel-spawning franchise" and said: "Tournament provides genre buffs with a lesson in diminishing returns, and may leave most of them impatient for an unambiguous 'Game Over.'"

== Possible sequel ==
When asked whether there would be a third Escape Room film that would continue from Champions' cliffhanger ending, Robitel replied that it could be made if Champions generates a good box office run and sufficient interest in a continuation of its story.
