= Suspension (2015 film) =

- Directed by: Jeffery Scott Lando
- Written by: Kevin Mosley
- Produced by: Sage Brocklebank; Jeffery Scott Lando
- Starring: Ellen MacNevin; Courtney Paige; Sage Brocklebank; Taylor Russell; Duncan Ollerenshaw; Connor Fielding; Owen Fielding; Barry Nerling; Steve Richmond; Rustin Gresiuk
- Cinematography: Shawn Seifert
- Music by: Steve London
- Production company: Suspended Reality Productions
- Distributed by: After Dark Films
- Release dates: 31 August 2015 (London Film4 Frightfest); 16 December 2015 (DVD)
- Running time: 87 minutes
- Country: Canada
- Language: English

Suspension is a 2015 Canadian slasher film directed by Jeffery Scott Lando and written by Kevin Mosley, starring Ellen MacNevin, Courtney Paige, Sage Brocklebank, Taylor Russell and Duncan Ollerenshaw.

== Cast ==
- Ellen MacNevin as Emily
- Courtney Paige as Theresa
- Sage Brocklebank as Deputy Jacobs
- Taylor Russell as Carrie
- Duncan Ollerenshaw as Sheriff Mitchum
- Connor and Owen Fielding as Jeremy
- Barry Nerling as Tom
- Steve Richmond as Jason
- Rustin Gresiuk as Frank
- Chilton Crane as Mrs. Vera Miller
- Lisa Ovies as Paula
- Johannah Newmarch as Alice
- Chris Nowland as Alice

== Release ==
The film premiered at London Film4 Frightfest on 31 August 2015 as part of the 8 Films to Die For.

== Reception ==
The film received polarising reviews from critics. Phil Wheat of Nerdly gave the film a 5 stars out of 5 and called it a "refreshing new take on a well-worn formula that revitalises the slasher movie in much the same way Wes Craven’s Scream did almost twenty years ago; whilst also subverting all that we know about this much-maligned, and often-denigrated, of horror genres." Jeff Mohr of Gruesome Magazine gave the film a score of 4 out of 5 and wrote that Lando and Mosley "do an excellent job of telling a complex story on a low budget while still making it look good". Mohr also praised the performances of MacNevin, Ollerenshaw, Brockleback, Russell and Paige. HorrorNews.net gave the film a score of 9 out of 10, praising the characters and the twist ending.

Ted Hentschke of Dread Central rated the film 2 stars out of 5 and wrote that while it "starts off strong", it eventually "becomes convoluted and full of holes, all in an attempt to mask the obvious inevitable plot twist." He criticised the twist, writing that it "ruins much of the film." Joel Harley of Starburst wrote that "for all its good intentions, the finale is just so wrong and so utterly misplaced, that it derails absolutely everything which has gone before. Here endeth the review: honestly, it’s that bad." Film critic Kim Newman wrote: "This well-crafted and ingenious essay in – and on – the slasher movie falters at the end by delivering a derivative twist that prompts an ‘is that all there is?’ let-down at precisely the point the movie ought to be going into overdrive."
