= Jacqueline Byers =

Canadian actress (born 1989)

- Born: 14 September 1989 (age 37); Toronto, Ontario, Canada
- Occupation: Actress
- Years active: 2003–present

Jacqueline Byers is a Canadian actress, known for starring on the CBC/Syfy series Ascension and the CBS series Salvation.

== Early life ==
Byers grew up in Mississauga, Ontario, where she attended Lorne Park Secondary School; she participated in school plays and was a star athlete on the lacrosse team. She attended Queen's University in Kingston where she earned a Bachelor of Arts in acting and was also part of the school's Lacrosse Varsity team. She began her career at the age of 12, performing in local musical productions of Annie and Peter Pan.

== Filmography ==
=== Film ===
| Year | Title | Role | Notes |
|---|---|---|---|
| 2003 | Blizzard | Skating Girl | Credited as Jackie Byers |
| 2015 | Full Out | Caity | |
| 2017 | Ordinary Days | Cara Cook | |
| 2018 | Bad Samaritan | Riley Seabrook | |
| 2019 | You Are Here | Brittany | |
| 2019 | Home in Time | Zoe | Short film |
| 2022 | Prey for the Devil | Sister Ann | |
| 2025 | Shadow of God | Tanis Green | |
| 2026 | Forbidden Fruits | Momfluencer | |

=== Television ===
| Year | Title | Role | Notes |
|---|---|---|---|
| 2014 | The Strain | Cleo | Episode: "The Box" |
| 2014 | Ascension | Nora Bryce | Miniseries |
| 2016 | Timeless | Bonnie Parker | Episode: "Last Ride of Bonnie & Clyde" |
| 2016 | Roadies | Natalie Shayne | Recurring role |
| 2017–18 | Salvation | Jillian Hayes | Main cast |
| 2019 | Diggstown | Rhonda LeBlanc | Episode: "Nikki LeBlanc" |
| 2023 | Dark Winds | Mary Landon | Recurring role (Season 2) |
| 2026–present | NCIS: New York | Addy Ross | Main cast |
