= Bad Samaritan (film) =

- Theatrical release poster
- Directed by: Dean Devlin
- Written by: Brandon Boyce
- Produced by: Dean Devlin; Rachel Olschan; Marc Roskin
- Starring: David Tennant; Robert Sheehan; Carlito Olivero; Kerry Condon; Jacqueline Byers
- Cinematography: David Connell
- Edited by: Brian Gonosey
- Music by: Joseph LoDuca
- Production company: Legion M
- Distributed by: Electric Entertainment
- Release date: May 4, 2018
- Running time: 107 minutes
- Country: United States
- Language: English
- Box office: $4.8 million

Bad Samaritan is a 2018 American thriller film directed by Dean Devlin and written by Brandon Boyce. The film stars David Tennant and Robert Sheehan, with Carlito Olivero, Kerry Condon, and Jacqueline Byers in supporting roles. Sheehan portrays the title character, a parking valet who burgles the houses of the drivers he services, only to discover one of his rich customers (Tennant) is a serial killer. It was released in the United States on May 4, 2018, and received mixed reviews from critics.

== Plot ==
While working as parking valets at a restaurant, Sean Falco and Derek Sandoval secretly use the cars entrusted to them by customers to burglarize their homes. On one night, however, Sean finds more than he bargained for when he breaks into the house of wealthy patron Cale Erendreich and discovers a woman named Katie being held captive. Unable to free Katie from her binds, Sean abandons her, but anonymously notifies the police of his discovery. When the police are unable to find any evidence of Katie's abduction and refuse to believe Sean, Sean contacts the FBI and files a missing persons report for her.

Cale, meanwhile, brings Katie to a secluded cabin and becomes aware of Sean's knowledge of her abduction. Motivated by a desire to break people down, Cale begins working to destroy Sean's life, including having Sean, Derek, and Sean's parents fired from their jobs for false reasons out of revenge. He also savagely beats Riley Seabrook, Sean's girlfriend, after ruining their relationship by leaking a topless photo of her. Cale then kills Derek and his family in their home and stages their deaths as a murder-suicide. Sean is able to take a screenshot of Cale’s face and send it to the FBI.

When Cale fails in his attempt to kill Sean with a bomb, Sean manages to use the navigation system in Cale's car to find the cabin where Katie is being held captive. Sean heads off to save her after, while a team of FBI agents also travel to the cabin after deducing that Cale is responsible for a series of similar disappearances around the country. The FBI discover that the property is in the name of Cale's family but are unable to enter the private property without a warrant. Sean finds Katie upon entering the cabin, only to be knocked out by Cale, who reveals that he intends to kill Katie and frame Sean for her murder, along with the deaths of his previous victims. Katie, however, survives Cale's attempt at killing her and frees Sean. As Sean and Katie flee the cabin, Cale pursues. Chasing Sean and Katie through the woods, Cale is ultimately overpowered by Sean and knocked unconscious.

The sound of Cale's gun is also heard by the FBI team, who are able to use the gunshot's noise as probable cause to enter the property. After finding Sean and Katie, the team enters the cabin, where they discover Cale chained up like his victims.

== Cast ==
- David Tennant as Cale Erendreich, a wealthy serial killer
- Robert Sheehan as Sean Falco, a restaurant parking valet and house burglar
- Kerry Condon as Katie Hopgood, a woman held captive in Cale's home
- Carlito Olivero as Derek Sandoval, Sean's fellow parking valet and partner in the burglaries
- Jacqueline Byers as Riley Seabrook, Sean's girlfriend
- Tracey Heggins as Olivia Fuller, an FBI agent investigating a series of disappearances
- Rob Nagle as Don Falco, Sean's stepfather
- Lorraine Bahr as Patty Falco, Sean's mother
- Jacob Resnikoff as Rowan Falco, Sean's brother
- David Meyers as Nino, Sean's and Derek's boss
- Tony Doupe as Wayne Bannon, a detective who initially investigates Cale
- Lisa Brenner as Helen Leyton

== Production ==
On September 16, 2013, it was announced that Dean Devlin's Electric Entertainment had bought the thriller script No Good Deed, written by Brandon Boyce, which Marc Roskin would make his directorial debut on, and which was set to be produced by Devlin, Roskin, and Rachel Olschan. On August 25, 2016, it was reported that Devlin would direct the film instead, and that David Tennant had been cast as a man whose home is burgled by the car valets. On September 22, 2016, Robert Sheehan was cast to star, as one of the valets, and on November 29, 2016, Carlito Olivero joined to play the other valet. Later, more cast was announced, including Kerry Condon, Jacqueline Byers, and Lisa Brenner.

Principal photography on the film began early 2017 in Portland, Oregon.

Electric Entertainment released the first official trailer for the film on February 7, 2018.

== Reception ==
=== Box office ===
In the United States and Canada, Bad Samaritan was released alongside Tully and Overboard, and was projected to gross around $2 million from 2,007 theaters in its opening weekend. It ended up debuting to $1.8 million, an average of $848 per theater, marking the eighth-worst opening for a wide release ever.

=== Critical response ===
On review aggregator website Rotten Tomatoes, the film holds an approval rating of 54% based on 74 reviews, and an average rating of 5.4/10. The website's critical consensus reads, "Bad Samaritan delivers a handful of genre thrills — and a stellar central performance by David Tennant — that help offset iffy direction and a disappointingly mundane story." On Metacritic, the film has a weighted average score of 42 out of 100, based on 20 critics, indicating "mixed or average" reviews. Audiences polled by CinemaScore gave the film an average grade of "B−" on an A+ to F scale, while PostTrak reported filmgoers gave it a 52% overall positive score and a 20% "definite recommend".

Variety's Peter Debruge gave the film a moderately positive review, saying, "producer-turned-director Dean Devlin...[delivers] a down-and-dirty quickie that's less ambitious in every sense yet ultimately far more effective as a piece of shamelessly manipulative, armrest-clutching genre entertainment."
