= Queen of Angels Church (Newark) =

Historic church in New Jersey, United States

- U.S. National Register of Historic Places
- New Jersey Register of Historic Places
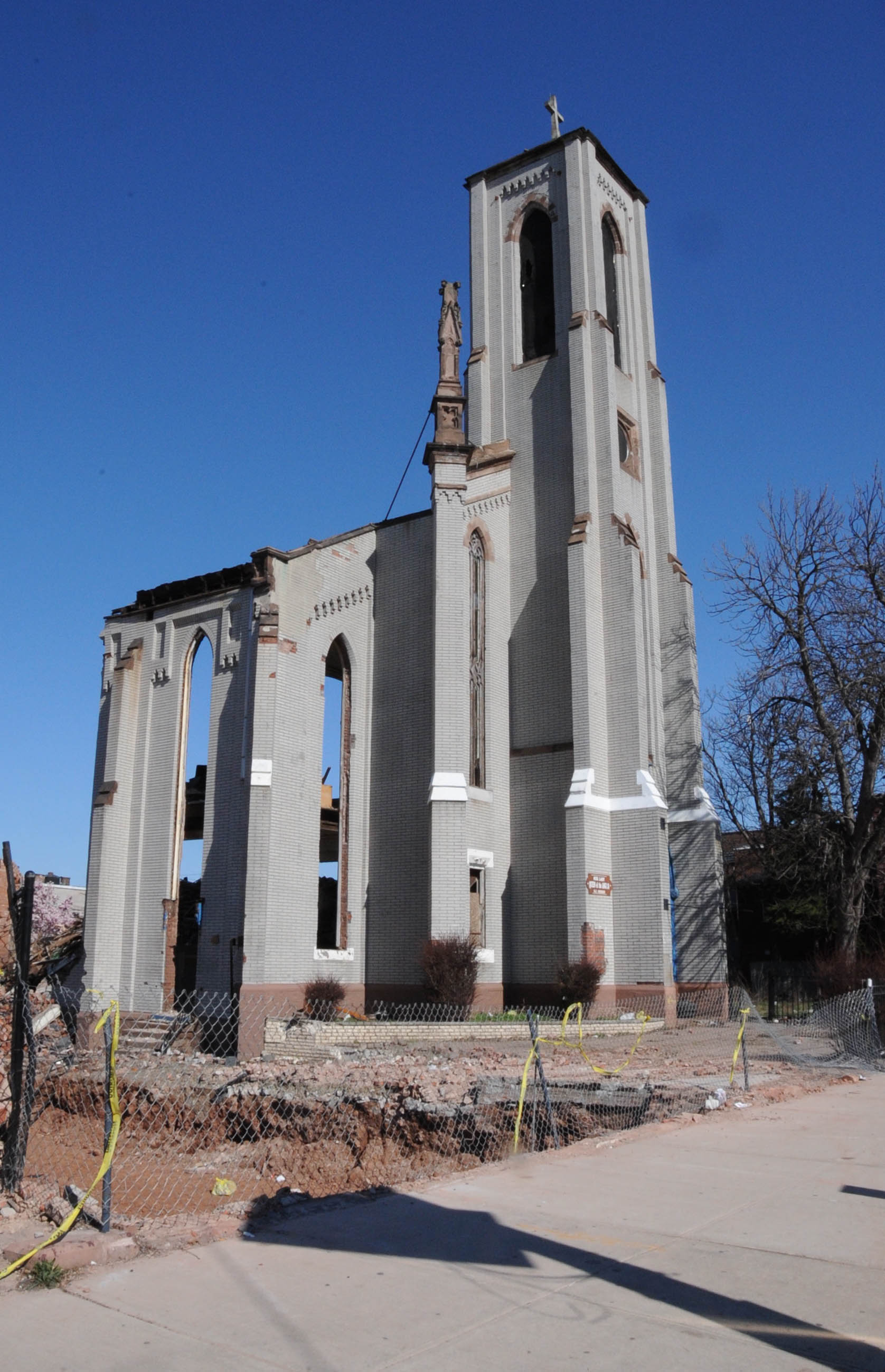
- Demolished in 2016

- Location within Essex County, New Jersey Location within New Jersey Location within the United States
- Location: Belmont Avenue at Morton Street, Newark, New Jersey
- Coordinates: 40°44′1″N 74°11′21″W
- Area: 1 acre (0.40 ha)
- Built: 1854
- Architects: Gsantner, Otto
- Architectural style: Gothic
- NRHP reference No.: 72000783
- NJRHP No.
- Added to NRHP: October 26, 1972

Queen of Angels Church ,formerly known as St. Peter's Church, was a historic Black Catholic church on Belmont Avenue (now Irvine Turner Blvd) at Morton Street in Newark, New Jersey. It was the first Catholic parish for African Americans in the Archdiocese of Newark.

== History ==
Queen of Angels was built between 1854 and 1861 and was Newark's first African-American Catholic parish, becoming such in 1926. Its original 1930 building was destroyed in 1958, and the parish relocated, taking over a space at a church once known as St. Peter's. It also had a parochial school under the same name.

During the Civil Rights Movement, Martin Luther King Jr. held meetings at the church for the Poor People's Campaign and the church also helped organized a march for racial harmony after his assassination.

The church was added to the National Register of Historic Places in 1972 and was administered by the Society of African Missions beginning in 1979. The school and parish closed in 2012.

The church was slated for demolition in 2014 and demolished in 2016.

== See also ==
- National Register of Historic Places listings in Essex County, New Jersey
