= Escape Room (2019 film) =

American psychological horror film

- Theatrical release poster
- Directed by: Adam Robitel
- Screenplay by: Bragi F. Schut; Maria Melnik
- Story by: Bragi F. Schut
- Produced by: Neal H. Moritz; Ori Marmur
- Starring: Taylor Russell; Logan Miller; Deborah Ann Woll; Tyler Labine; Nik Dodani; Jay Ellis; Yorick van Wageningen
- Cinematography: Marc Spicer
- Edited by: Steven Mirkovich
- Music by: Brian Tyler; John Carey
- Production companies: Columbia Pictures; Original Film
- Distributed by: Sony Pictures Releasing
- Release date: January 4, 2019 (United States)
- Running time: 100 minutes
- Country: United States
- Language: English
- Budget: $9 million
- Box office: $155.7 million

Escape Room is a 2019 American psychological horror survival film directed by Adam Robitel from a screenplay by Bragi F. Schut and Maria Melnik, based on a story conceived by Schut. The film stars Taylor Russell, Logan Miller, Deborah Ann Woll, Tyler Labine, Nik Dodani, Jay Ellis, and Yorick van Wageningen, and follows a group of people who are sent to navigate a series of deadly escape rooms.

Development of the film began in August 2017, then under the title The Maze, and the casting process commenced. Schut and Melnik were hired to write the screenplay, and Robitel was confirmed to be directing. Filming took place in South Africa in late 2017 through January 2018. Brian Tyler and Jon Carey were hired to compose the film's score, with Tyler also conducting.

Escape Room was released in the United States on January 4, 2019, by Columbia Pictures (via Sony Pictures Releasing). It grossed over $155 million worldwide and received mixed reviews from critics, who praised its atmosphere, cast, and production design, but criticized the familiar plot and its failure to take full advantage of its premise. It was followed by the sequel Escape Room: Tournament of Champions in 2021.

== Plot ==
A young man named Ben falls through the ceiling of a room where the walls begin moving inwards. He tries to solve a puzzle to unlock the exit, but is unable to do so as the walls close on him.

Three days earlier, a puzzle cube is sent to various people in Chicago: Zoey, a physics student; Jason, a wealthy daytrader; and Ben, who works as a stockboy. When they each solve the puzzle, they are invited to take part in an escape room by the company Minos with a $10,000 prize.

Zoey, Jason, and Ben meet each other and the other contestants in the Minos office waiting room: Mike, a truck driver; Amanda, an Iraq War veteran; and Danny, an escape room enthusiast. When Ben tries to leave the waiting room it is revealed to be the first escape room, a giant oven. The group makes it to the next room, which holds a winter cabin, snowy woods, and a frozen lake. Danny falls through ice of the lake and drowns, showing that the rooms are actually dangerous.

The third room is an upside-down billiards hall where parts of the floor periodically fall into a deep shaft as they advance through the room. Amanda falls to her death after saving an 8 ball necessary to solve the room's puzzle.

The next room has a hospital theme and beds that remind each of the players of past experiences where they were sole survivors of various disasters. Mike survived a mine cave-in, Zoey survived a plane crash, Danny survived carbon monoxide poisoning that killed his family, Amanda survived an IED blast, Jason survived a shipwreck in frigid weather, and Ben survived a car accident where his friends died. Zoey realizes that the various escape rooms have been modeled on those past experiences and that she and the other players were deliberately targeted by Minos. Enraged, she stops playing and begins looking for a way out of the game, even as the room begins to fill with toxic gas.

The others realize that they need to register a certain heart rate to escape and Jason accidentally shocks Mike to death with a defibrillator while attempting to do so. Jason and Ben manage to open the door to the next room, but Zoey refuses to leave and is left behind. A transdermal drug on a hatch in the next room poisons Ben and Jason and disorients them. When Ben finds a dose of antidote, Jason attacks him and Ben accidentally kills him in the struggle before falling into the room from the beginning of the movie.

Ben escapes the parlor via the fireplace and meets the Gamemaster. He explains each game's players follow a particular theme, which the Puzzle Maker uses to craft the rooms. The Gamemaster then runs the game for the players while wealthy viewers watch and bet on the results.

Ben is attacked by the Gamemaster, but Zoey intervenes, having used an oxygen mask in the hospital room to survive the gas and escaped the room after Minos employees entered. Together they kill the Gamemaster and escape.

Zoey returns to the building with the police, but the building appears abandoned and all evidence of the game has disappeared. Six months later, Zoey meets up with Ben and shows him newspaper articles about the other players' deaths, which have been staged to look like accidents. She also shares that clues from the Minos company logo point to a building in Manhattan. After sharing her plan to fly to New York City to confront Minos directly, Ben agrees to go with her.

An airplane is shown to be in distress, with flight attendants working on a puzzle in order to access the cockpit. They solve it, but access the cockpit too late to save the plane from crashing. It is revealed to be a mock plane testing a new Minos escape room designed for Zoey and Ben's flight to New York.

== Cast ==
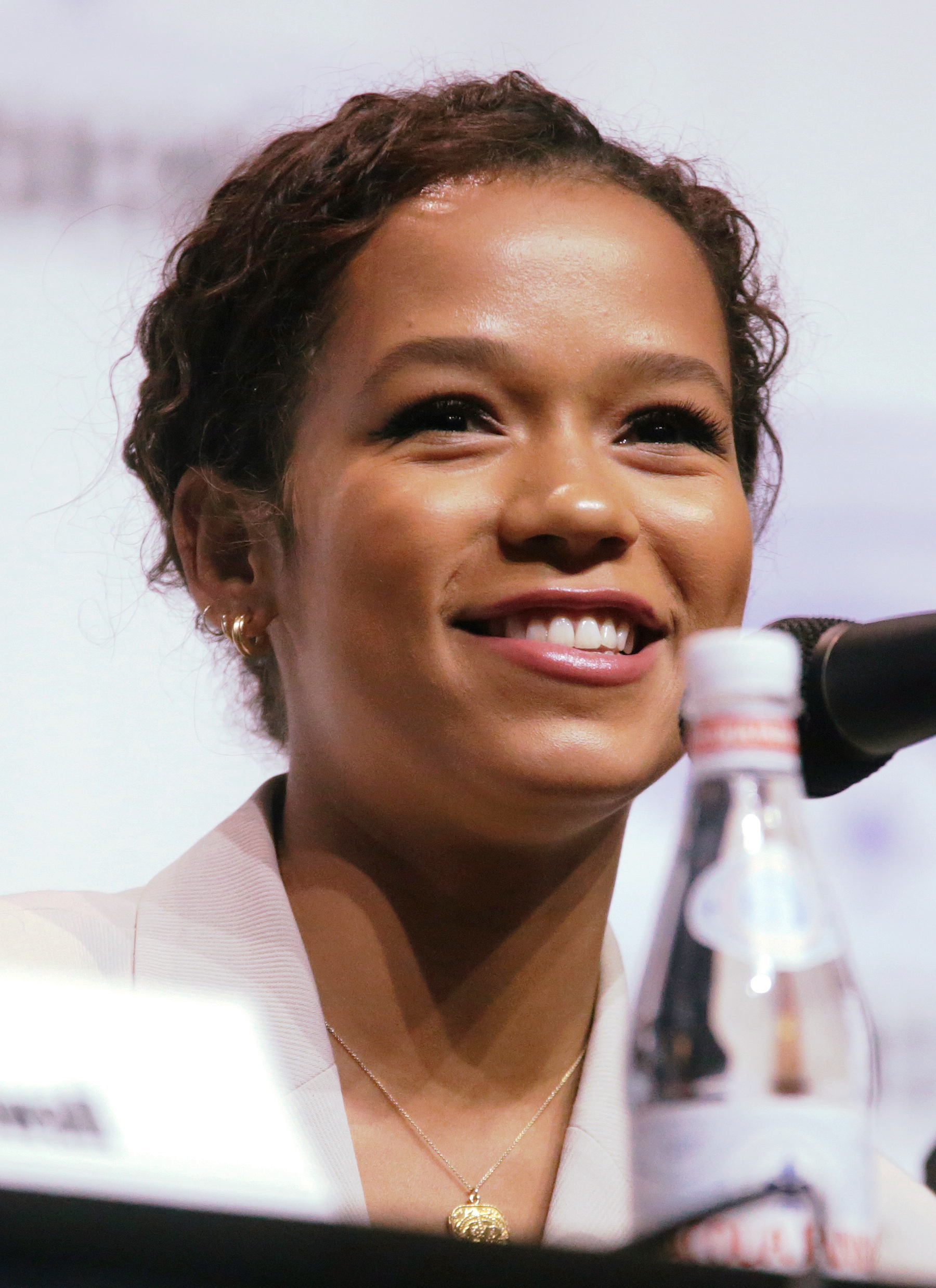
Lead actress Taylor Russell

- Taylor Russell as Zoey Davis, a young college student
- Logan Miller as Ben Miller, a stockboy at a grocery store
- Deborah Ann Woll as Amanda Harper, an Iraq War veteran with PTSD
- Tyler Labine as Mike Nolan, a middle-aged truck driver from Wilmette, Illinois
- Nik Dodani as Danny Khan, an experienced escape room enthusiast
- Jay Ellis as Jason Walker, a stock trader
- Yorick van Wageningen as the Gamemaster

Additionally, Cornelius Geaney Jr. appears as Zoey's professor while Jessica Sutton portrays her roommate, Allison. Russell Crous portrays Charlie, Jason's assistant; Bart Fouche portrays Gary, Ben's boss; Kenneth Fok portrays Detective Li; and Jamie-Lee Money portrays Rosa, a fake flight attendant who works for Minos. Director Adam Robitel also has a minor role in the film as a character named Gabe.

== Production ==
On August 9, 2017, it was announced that the film, then titled The Maze, had commenced casting, based on an original story created by screenwriter Bragi F. Schut. It was set to shoot in South Africa in late 2017. In January 2018, director Robitel told Syfy that production had wrapped and that the film would be released in September 2018, before the film was delayed multiple times to an eventual early 2019 release.

Brian Tyler and John Carey composed the score for the film. The soundtrack was released by Sony Music Entertainment, and includes the full score and a remix of the film's main theme by Madsonik and Kill the Noise, used in the closing credits.

Robitel originally planned the film to end with one of the survivors returning home but decided to change the ending to make the antagonists appear more menacing in anticipation of the sequel.

== Release ==
In May 2018, it was announced that the film was going to be released on November 30, 2018. A month later, the film was pushed back two months from its original release date of November 30, 2018, to February 1, 2019, and later was moved up from February 1, 2019, to January 4, 2019.

In Poland, United International Pictures delayed the film's release out of respect for the five teenagers who had died in the ToNiePokój escape room fire, which actually occurred on the day of the film's U.S. release. Ultimately, the film's distribution in Poland was indefinitely postponed due to the tragedy.

== Reception ==
=== Box office ===
Escape Room grossed $57 million in the United States and Canada, and $98.7 million in other territories, for a total worldwide gross of $155.7 million, against a production budget of $9 million. Deadline Hollywood calculated the net profit of the film to be $46.6 million, when factoring together all expenses and revenues.

In the United States and Canada, the film was projected to gross $10–14 million from 2,717 theaters in its opening weekend. It made $7.7 million on its first day, including $2.3 million from Thursday night previews. It went on to debut to $18.2 million, surpassing expectations and finishing second, behind Aquaman. The film made $8.9 million in its second weekend, dropping 51% and finishing fifth.

=== Critical response ===
On review aggregator Rotten Tomatoes, the film holds an approval rating of 51% based on 164 reviews. The website's critical consensus reads, "Escape Room fails to unlock much of the potential in its premise, but what's left is still tense and thrilling enough to offer a passing diversion for suspense fans." On Metacritic, the film has a weighted average score of 48 out of 100, based on 26 critics, indicating "mixed or average" reviews. Audiences polled by CinemaScore gave the film a grade of "B" on an A+ to F scale.

Sandy Schaelfer from Screen Rant gave the film 2.5 out of 5 stars, writing that "Escape Room is an entertainingly cheesy and surprisingly innovative B-movie, but suffers when it turns its attention to setting up future sequels."

== Sequel ==
In February 2019, a sequel, Escape Room: Tournament of Champions, was announced as being in active development, with Robitel set to return to direct along with screenwriter Schut and producer Moritz. In October 2019, Collider reported that original cast members Russell and Miller would reprise their roles in the sequel. It was released on July 16, 2021.
