= Alexandra Grey =

American actress (b. 1991)

- Grey in 2026
- Born: January 4, 1991 (age 35); Chicago, Illinois, U.S.
- Other name: Alëxandra
- Education: California State University, Northridge; (BA)
- Occupations: Actress, singer
- Years active: 2011–present
- Known for: Empire as Melody Barnes; Transparent as Elizah Parks

Alexandra Giuliana Grey (born January 4, 1991), also known mononymously as Alëxandra /ˌælɪɡˈzændrə/, is an American actress, singer, songwriter and producer. She is best known for her roles as Melody Barnes on the Fox music drama series Empire, Elizah Parks on the comedy series Transparent and Parker Phillip's on the CBS action/adventure series MacGyver. She also has had guest roles on Chicago Med, Code Black, How to Get Away with Murder, Drunk History and the period television drama series The Alienist.

== Early life and education ==
Grey was born in Chicago. She grew up in foster care. Grey, a trans woman, stated in an interview, "I knew as early as 4 that I wanted to be a girl," but didn't know how to discuss this with her foster parents, stating "In the African‑American community, this stuff is not even up for discussion."

After graduating from community college, Grey initially came out to her foster parents as gay. They were reluctant to accept her sexuality. Once she told them she was transgender, they threw her out of the house. She moved from Chicago to Los Angeles, and lived in an LGBT homeless shelter until she saved enough money to get her own place. She attended California State University Northridge and studied theater.

== Career ==
Grey moved to Los Angeles with the hopes of beginning a career in singing or acting. In 2016, she was cast as Elizah Parks in the third season of Transparent. Grey played a troubled foster youth living in South Central Los Angeles, California who calls Maura, played by Jeffrey Tambor, on the LGBT suicide hotline for help. The season went on to win the GLAAD Media Award for Best Comedy Series and later earned seven Primetime Emmy Nominations in 2017.

Grey also guest-starred on Season 2 of the CBS TV medical drama Code Black as Beth Jensen a young queer woman battling abdominal pains. She then guest-starred on Season 4 of the Comedy Central series Drunk History where she portrayed gay rights activist Marsha P. Johnson. The episode was nominated for a GLAAD Media Award for Outstanding Individual TV Episode. Grey was also considered for Outstanding Guest Actress in a Comedy Series. On June 3, 2016, it was announced that she was cast alongside Michael K. Williams, Phylicia Rashad, and Whoopi Goldberg to play trans activist and civil rights pioneer Seville Anderson in the ABC mini-series When We Rise. The series was directed by Oscar winner Dustin Lance Black. In the fall of 2016, she was cast in Chicago Med, in which she plays Denise, the older sister of head charge nurse Maggie Lockwood. She appeared as a guest star on the legal drama Doubt in 2017 with co-star Dulé Hill. Grey played Delilah Johnson, a woman on trial for the murder of a famous athlete. The story line was based on the real-life story of CeCe McDonald.

As a singer, she opened for Swedish singer-songwriter Zara Larsson in October 2016, and completed a twelve city summer music tour in 2017. She has also opened for Kesha and Jordin Sparks at various pride music festivals.

In 2017, transgender actors and actresses including Grey (with the help of GLAAD and ScreenCrush) were part of a filmed letter to Hollywood written by Jen Richards, asking for more and improved roles for transgender people. Later that year she starred as Lucy Jones in Asher Jelinsky's critically acclaimed short film Miller & Son (2019), which won the BAFTA Student Film Award and gold medal for "Best Narrative" (Domestic) at the 2019 Student Academy Awards.

It was announced in Fall 2018, that she would star as Gossamer Bryant in the new coming of age drama Gossamer Folds alongside Shane West, Yeardley Smith, and Sprague Grayden. The drama tells the story of afriendship between a black midwestern trans woman and a 10 year old kid played by Jackson Robert Scott in 1980s Kansas City. In April 2022, the film was nominated for Outstanding Film – Limited Release at the GLAAD Media Awards. Grey then landed her first national print campaign in 2019 with Absolut to commemorate Pride and 38 years of acceptance with the brand.

In January 2019, she returned to the series Transparent in her role as Elizah Parks on for its fifth season which premiered later that year on Amazon Prime. The series went on to win the GLAAD Media Award for Outstanding TV Movie or Limited Series in 2020. In September 2019, it was announced via Deadline Hollywood that Grey had joined the sixth and final season cast of Empire to play Melody Barnes, a pop singer and songwriter who was signed to Empire Records by Lucious Lyon ten years earlier and has now reemerged under a new label headed by Cookie Lyon. Grey has since recorded five singles on the soundtrack which have all been released exclusively by Hollywood Records. In October, she guest-starred on How to Get Away with Murder where she played Brandi Green, a young woman on trial for the murder of her husband, opposite Viola Davis.

In 2020, she portrayed the fictional character of Alice Tolton in the second season of the TNT drama series The Alienist. Later that year, Alexandra along with several other actors, including Audra McDonald, Sterling K. Brown, Renée Elise Goldsberry and Joe Morton, performed for the Public Theater in NYC the Shakespearean monologue "To Be or Not to Be" from Hamlet in honor of Juneteenth.

Currently, Grey is starring as Lucy Hicks Anderson in the HBO Max miniseries Equal from producer Greg Berlanti. In February, Deadline Hollywood announced that Grey had joined the fifth-season cast of the CBS action/adventure series MacGyver. She played the role of Parker Phillips, an ambitious electrical engineer and the newest addition to the MacGyver team, until the show's cancellation in early April 2021. In the summer of 2021, it was announced that Grey would star opposite Mickey Rourke and Jeremy Luke in the romantic thriller Replica. She will play the main character Tonya, a trans woman whom travels from Mississippi to California to pursue her dreams but finds love in all the wrong places. Variety also announced later in the year that she would lead another romantic thriller, Dope Queens starring opposite Pierson Fodé. The film is set to release in 2022.

In March 2022, Grey starred in a City Center Encores! production of the Broadway musical The Life in her New York City stage debut. She played the main character Queen, an charismatic sex worker whom longs for acceptance and family, adapted and directed by Billy Porter. Before rehearsing with the full cast, she trained with a vocal coach in Los Angeles for four weeks. Grey's role marked the first time a transgender performer lead a production in New York City Center ENCORES twenty-eight year history.

== Filmography ==
=== Film ===
Year	Title	Role	Notes
2012	K-11	Xandra Kayden	
2012	I Do	College Student	
2013	Baggage Claim	Kiele	
2015	The Fix	Alexis	
2019	Miller & Son	Lucy	Won - Student Academy Awards Best Narrative (Domestic); Won - BAFTA Student Film Awards Best Live Action Short Film
2020	Gossamer Folds	Gossamer Bryant	Lead role Oxford International Film Festival Lisa Blount Acting Award; Oxford International Film Festival Honorable Mention for Outstanding Performance; Won - Out on Film Jury Award (Best Actress)
2020	Disclosure: Trans Lives on Screen	Herself	Documentary film
2024	Regarding Us	Veronica	

=== Television ===
Year	Title	Role	Notes
2012	DTLA	Eva	Episode: "Pilot"
2015	Glee	Erica	Episode: "Transitioning"
2015	Chasing Life	Kenya Martin	Episode: "As Long as We Both Shall Live"
2016	Code Black	Beth	Episode: "Life and Limb"
2016	Drunk History	Marsha P. Johnson	Episode: "Bar Fights"; Nominated - GLAAD Media Award for Outstanding Individual Episode (2017)
2016, 2019	Transparent	Elizah Parks	2 episodes
2016, 2019	Chicago Med	Denise Lockwood	2 episodes
2017	When We Rise	Seville	Episode: "Parts VI and VII"
2017	Doubt	Delilah Johnson	Episode: "Faith"
2019	How to Get Away with Murder	Brandi Green	Episode: Do You Think I'm A Bad Man?
2019–2020	Empire	Melody Barnes	Recurring Role (6 episodes)
2020	The Alienist	Alice	Episode: "Angel of Darkness: Last Ticket to Brooklyn"
2020	Equal	Lucy Hicks Anderson	Main Role
2020–2021	MacGyver	Parker Philips	Recurring Role (4 episodes)
2023	The Resident	Thea Dwyer	Episode: "All the Wiser"

=== Theatre ===
Year	Title	Role	Venue	Notes
2022	The Life	Queen	New York City Center	Part of the Encores! series
