= Jesse James Keitel =

American actress, writer, and artist

- Born: Manorville, New York
- Education: Pace University
- Occupations: Actress, writer, artist
- Years active: 2013–present
- Relatives: Harvey Keitel

Jesse James Keitel is an American actress, writer, and artist, known for starring in Asher Jelinsky's award-winning short film Miller & Son (2019), the ABC crime drama Big Sky (2020) and on Queer as Folk (2022).

== Early life ==
Jesse James Keitel is from Manorville, New York and was involved in local theater as a performer during her childhood. She graduated from Pace University with a BFA in Acting in 2015. After college, she was a drag performer in New York City with the stage name Peroxide.

== Career ==
In 2019, Keitel starred in the world premiere of Martin Moran's play Theo at Two River Theater. She also starred in Miller & Son (2019), which won the BAFTA Student Film Award and gold medal for "Best Narrative" (Domestic) at the 2019 Student Academy Awards. Keitel played the leading role in the 2020 MadRiver Pictures sci-fi series, Forever Alone. Keitel also appeared in Linda Yellen's 2019 Showtime feature film Fluidity, starring Nico Tortorella. In 2022, Keitel debuted the role of Ruthie in Peacock's Queer As Folk.

Keitel has performed in drag under the stage name Peroxide, a member of the House of Femanon. As Peroxide Femanon, she has appeared in Logo TV's Fill In The Blank docuseries and in Sasha Velour's NYFW SS19 collaboration with Opening Ceremony.

Beginning in 2020, Keitel starred as Jerrie Kennedy in the David E. Kelley-created crime thriller Big Sky, which made her one of the first non-binary actors to play a non-binary series regular on primetime television. In 2022, she appeared in an episode of Star Trek: Strange New Worlds, playing a non-binary villain. In an interview, she said of the role: "I understand that queer people have had a really long and complicated history with TV and film, and they’ve been very mistreated in the media....That being said, I think it’s high time we let queer people be villains, you know?"

== Awards and accolades ==
Keitel was honored in Out magazine's OUT100 in 2018 for her portrayal of queer characters in the Ben Stiller-produced Netflix film Alex Strangelove, as well as playing TV Land's first non-binary character on Younger.

== Personal life ==
In 2020, Keitel identified as non-binary and used they/them pronouns. In 2022, she came out as a trans woman and began using she/her pronouns.

According to NBC News, Keitel is a "distant relative" of Harvey Keitel.

== Filmography ==
Film & Television Roles
Year	Title	Role	Notes
2013	Celebrity Ghost Stories	David	Episode "Coco/Craig Kilborn/Diana DeGarmo/Tommy Davidson"
2016	What Would You Do?	Closeted Gay Teen	Episode: #12.3 (Note: Note that IMDb counts this as S. 7 Ep. 7, while the en.wiki article groups it as S. 12 Ep. 3)
2018	Alex Strangelove	Sidney	Film
2018	Younger	Tam	Episode #505: "Big Little Liza"
2019	Miller & Son	Ryan Miller	Film
2019	Fluidity	Kevin	Film
2019	Like Glass	Zion	Film
2020	Forever Alone	Adrian	6 episodes
2020–2022	Big Sky	Jerrie Kennedy	Main role (2020–2021), special guest star (2021–2022)
2021	This Is Me: Pride Celebration Spectacular	Herself	Special
2022	Queer as Folk	Ruthie O'Neil	Main role
2022	Star Trek: Strange New Worlds	Dr. Aspen/Captain Angel	Episode: "The Serene Squall"
2026	56 Days	Alison Meadows	3 episodes
