= Leisinger =

Leisinger is a surname. Notable people with the surname include:

- Elisabeth Leisinger (1864–1913), German dramatic soprano
- Klaus M. Leisinger (born 1947), Swiss social scientist and economist
- Ulrich Leisinger (born 1964), German musicologist

== See also ==
- Leininger
