= Lindinger =

Lindinger is a Germanic and Scandinavian surname. Notable people with the surname include:

- Eduard Lindinger (1915–2004), German Luftwaffe pilot
- Herbert Lindinger (born 1933), German industrial designer

== See also ==
- Lininger
