= Jackson Robert Scott =

American actor (born 2008)

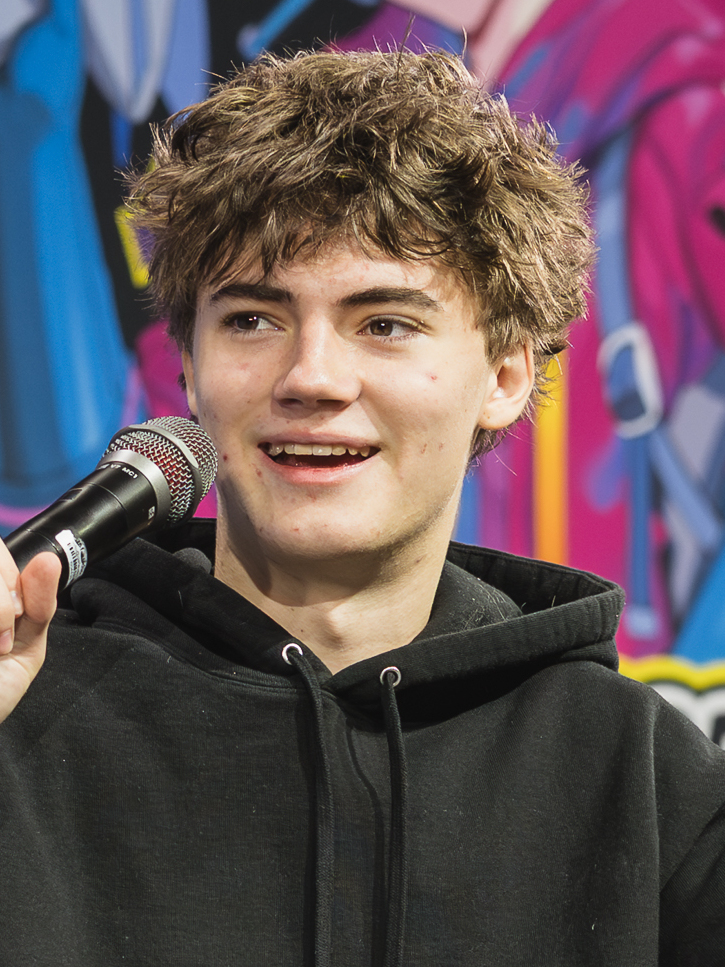
- Scott in 2025
- Born: September 18, 2008 (age 17); Phoenix, Arizona, U.S.
- Occupation: Actor
- Years active: 2015–present

Jackson Robert Scott (born September 18, 2008) is an American actor. He is known for portraying Bode Locke in the Netflix series Locke & Key (2020–2022) and Georgie Denbrough in the films It Chapter One (2017) and It Chapter Two (2019).

== Early life ==
Scott was born and raised in Phoenix, Arizona. He enrolled in his school's Mandarin Immersion Program, in which he learned to speak Mandarin Chinese. He is also a boy scout.

He was a part of the CGTV acting program where he learned many of his acting techniques. While at the CGTV program, he worked with actors from Nickelodeon and Disney, as well as Adrian R'Mante, the founder of CGTV. His favorite class was Improvisational Workshop.

He was discovered by a top agency sometime after his time with CGTV and began his start in auditioning and self-taping for top-tier television shows.

== Career ==
Scott got his first role in 2015 on Criminal Minds, which is a prime-time American TV series. At that time, Scott was cast in Season 11's fourth episode, titled "Outlaw", as Cole Vasquez, this episode aired on October 21, 2015. He also played a minor character in an episode of Fear the Walking Dead titled "TEOTWAWKI", playing the child version of the character Troy Otto.

In 2016, Scott was cast to play Georgie Denbrough in the 2017 film adaptation of Stephen King's novel It. Georgie is a character that Pennywise the Dancing Clown haunts at the start of the film. Scott had said that he did not feel intimidated or scared of Bill Skarsgård, who played Pennywise, as Skarsgård was a nice person in real life. Scott attended the premiere for the film at Grauman's Chinese Theatre. He reprised his role of Georgie in the sequel, It Chapter Two, which was released on September 6, 2019.

Scott was cast in the role of Troy for the short film Skin (2018), directed by Guy Nattiv, which would go on to win the Academy Award for Best Live Action Short Film at the 91st Academy Awards.

Continuing in the horror genre, Scott played the title role of Miles Blume in the 2019 film The Prodigy, directed by Nicholas McCarthy. This marked his first starring role in a feature film, co-starring alongside Taylor Schilling.

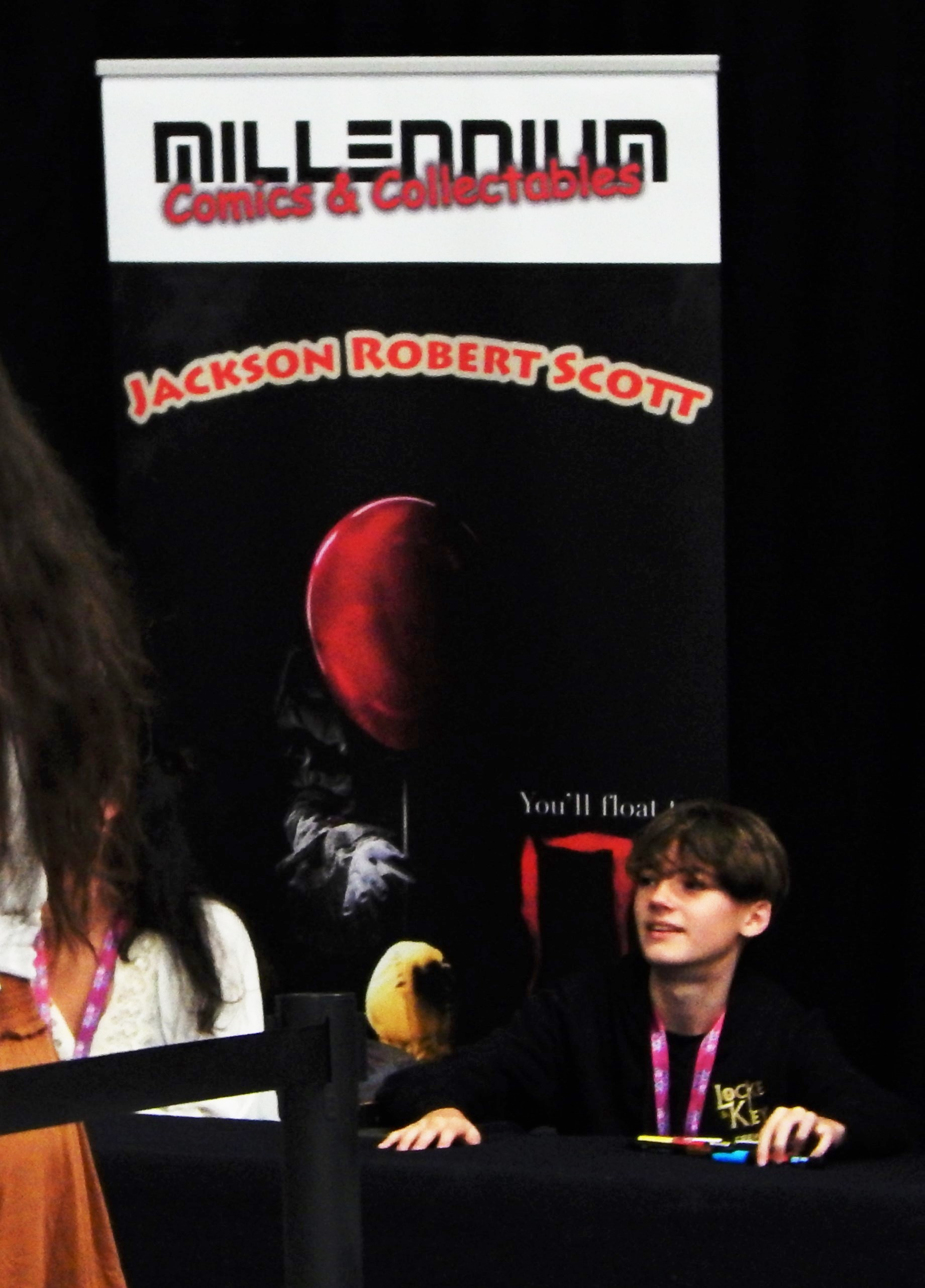
Scott at Capricon in Rockhampton, Queensland, Australia in 2022

Andrés Muschietti had recruited Scott to be a part of his one-hour series pilot of Locke & Key for Hulu as one of the leading young actors opposite Frances O'Connor. He played the part of Bode Locke, the youngest of the siblings. Hulu passed on the pilot and declined to order it to series. However, Netflix later redeveloped the series with a new cast, only keeping Scott as Bode from the Hulu cast. The first season was released on Netflix on February 7, 2020. Scott stated in an interview for AZCentral that Bode has been his favorite character to play, because he shares a lot of qualities with that character, such as his fun-loving personality and his love of bacon. The writers of the series met Jackson while filming so they could incorporate aspects of his real-life personality into the character of Bode. Scott also said in the same interview that he grew very close to the other actors of Locke & Key while they were filming the series. Scott continued the role of Bode in the second and third seasons, which were filmed back-to-back so that he did not grow up too much in the series. The second season was released on Netflix on October 22, 2021, and the third season was released on August 10, 2022. Scott enjoyed playing the demonic Dodge who possesses Bode's body in the third season of the series, of which he said, "I think that's probably one of the most fun times I've had playing a role."

In 2018, Scott was cast in the role of Tate Millikin for the independent film Gossamer Folds, directed by Lisa Donato. He co-starred with Alexandra Grey and Shane West. The film was produced by Yeardley Smith.

== Filmography ==
=== Film ===
| Year | Title | Role | Notes |
|---|---|---|---|
| 2017 | It | Georgie Denbrough | |
| 2018 | Skin | Troy | Academy Award for Best Live Action Short Film |
| 2019 | The Prodigy | Miles Blume | |
| 2019 | It Chapter Two | Georgie Denbrough | |
| 2020 | Gossamer Folds | Tate Millikin | |
| 2021 | They Came From Below | Luke | Short film |
| 2023 | Jesus Revolution | Young Greg Laurie | |

=== Television ===
| Year | Title | Role | Notes |
|---|---|---|---|
| 2015 | Criminal Minds | Cole Vasquez | Episode: "Outlaw" |
| 2017 | Fear the Walking Dead | Young Troy Otto | Episode: "TEOTWAWKI" |
| 2020–2022 | Locke & Key | Bode Locke | Main role; 28 episodes |
