= The Prodigy (film) =

2019 horror film

- Theatrical release poster
- Directed by: Nicholas McCarthy
- Written by: Jeff Buhler
- Produced by: Tripp Vinson
- Starring: Taylor Schilling; Jackson Robert Scott; Colm Feore
- Cinematography: Bridger Nielson
- Edited by: Tom Elkins; Brian Ufberg
- Music by: Joseph Bishara
- Production companies: Orion Pictures; Vinson Films; XYZ Films
- Distributed by: Mirror Releasing
- Release date: February 8, 2019 (United States)
- Running time: 92 minutes
- Countries: United States; Canada; Hong Kong
- Language: English
- Budget: $6 million
- Box office: $22.4 million

The Prodigy is a 2019 horror film directed by Nicholas McCarthy, and written by Jeff Buhler. It stars Taylor Schilling, Jackson Robert Scott, and Colm Feore. The plot centers around a child whose disturbing behavior signals that an evil, possibly supernatural being has taken control of him, forcing his parents to investigate whether sinister forces are involved. An international co-production film between the United States, Canada and Hong Kong.

The Prodigy was released in the United States on February 8, 2019, by Mirror Releasing and Orion Pictures. The film grossed $22.4 million and received mixed reviews from critics, who praised the performances and atmosphere but criticised the story and dialogue.

== Plot ==
On August 22, 2010, in rural Ohio, serial killer Edward Scarka is fatally shot during a police raid of his farmhouse. At the time of Edward's death, married couple Sarah and John give birth to their son, Miles, in Pennsylvania. Miles shows extreme wisdom and intelligence from a young age and begins speaking fluently before he is even a toddler.

When Miles turns eight in 2018, Sarah and John begin noticing behavioural changes in him. One night he plays a prank on his babysitter Zoe, seriously injuring her, but claims no memory of the incident. At school, he attacks a classmate with a wrench. Sarah takes Miles to psychiatrist Elaine Strasser and turns over a tape recording of him talking apparent gibberish in his sleep. Elaine gives the tape to a colleague, Arthur Jacobson, an expert on rebirth and reincarnation. Arthur reveals that the gibberish Miles spoke is, in fact, a rare dialect of Hungarian and that the words translate to "I'll cut your eyes out and watch you die, whore."

Sarah is unwilling to believe Arthur's assertion that an unsettled spirit wants control of the boy's body. At home, the family's dog goes missing, and John becomes infuriated when he finds that Miles has been recording the couple's bedroom with a baby monitor. John leaves to stay with his brother, leaving Sarah alone with Miles. Sarah later finds a swarm of flies in the house and discovers the family's dismembered dog in the basement. Miles apologizes, explaining that someone is invading his dreams every night and that he has to "make room."

Sarah takes Miles to see Arthur, who hypnotizes him in the hopes of engaging in past life regression, which will allow him to speak to the dark spirit in Miles' body. The regression is successful and the individual explains that his parents were Hungarian immigrants. The session goes awry when Miles threatens to accuse Arthur of drugging and molesting him, which prompts Arthur to end the session. Afterwards, Arthur finds "Scarka" carved into his leather couch from the boy's fingernails. He calls Sarah and explains that he believes Miles' body is being possessed by Edward Scarka, attempting to return to continue his killing spree.

Upon researching Edward, Sarah finds he died only minutes before Miles' birth and is startled to see that, like Miles, he had two different-coloured eyes. John and Sarah decide to have Miles committed, but Miles stabs John en route to the facility, causing him to crash; John goes into a coma as a result of the accident. In Miles' room, Sarah uncovers a cache of newspaper clippings about Edward's crimes, as well as a book by Margaret St. James, Edward's final victim, who escaped and led authorities to him.

Sarah realizes Edward is attempting to return to claim Margaret. She decides to kill Margaret herself, ending Edward's need for Miles' body. She drugs Miles with sleeping pills and the two drive to Margaret's rural farmhouse. Sarah poses as a battered woman who was touched by Margaret's book, persuading Margaret to allow her inside. She then draws a gun but is unable to bring herself to shoot. Miles enters and brutally attacks Margaret with a butcher knife, stabbing and disemboweling her. Sarah chases Miles outside to console him, believing Edward has left his body now that his final deed is complete. However, he reveals that Edward has taken full control, and Miles' soul has already been vanquished.

Horrified, Sarah attempts to shoot him, but before she can, a farmer shoots her with a rifle, killing her instantly. Sometime later, Miles is taken to live in a temporary foster home until John is discharged from the hospital. In his new bedroom, Miles stares into a mirror, which reflects the image of Edward.

== Cast ==
- Taylor Schilling as Sarah Blume
- Jackson Robert Scott as Miles Blume / Edward Scarka
  - David Kohlsmith as Miles, age 5
  - Paul Fauteux as Edward Scarka
- Colm Feore as Arthur Jacobson
- Brittany Allen as Margaret St. James
- Peter Mooney as John Blume
- Oluniké Adeliyi as Rebecca
- Elisa Moolecherry as Zoe
- Paula Boudreau as Dr. Elaine Strasser
- Martin Roach as Dr. Kagan
- Ashley Back as Hailey
- Tristan Vasquez as Dash

== Production ==
=== Development ===
In June 2018, Orion Pictures announced that the film, originally titled Descendant, would be released in February 2019, with Nicholas McCarthy directing, Jeff Buhler writing, and Taylor Schilling starring in the lead role. Daniel Bekerman, Lisa Zambri, Nick Spicer and Jeff Buhler will serve as executive producers.

During the film's production, Orion Pictures' president John Hegeman said about the project in a statement:

“Descendant is a unique and terrifying addition to the horror genre and we are looking forward to working with Nicholas, Tripp and Taylor in bringing Jeff’s script to life."

In October 2018, McCarthy revealed that a scene had to be re-edited after it was found that it made a test audience scream so much that they missed the following dialogue.

The film includes an interview with another family who believed their child had memories of a previous life. That was actual footage of a real interview about James Leininger, whose parents believed his nightmares about plane crashes were caused by having had a previous life as a World War II pilot.

=== Casting ===
By June 2018, Jackson Robert Scott, Peter Mooney, Colm Feore and Brittany Allen were cast in the film.

=== Filming ===
Principal photography on the film began in March 2018 and wrapped in the same month in Toronto, Ontario, Canada.

=== Music ===
The dark orchestral score was composed by Joseph Bishara and released on vinyl in 2019 by Waxwork Records.

== Release ==
The film was released in the United States on February 8, 2019, by Orion Pictures.

== Reception ==
=== Box office ===
The Prodigy grossed $14.9 million in the United States and Canada, and $7.6 million in other territories, for a total worldwide gross of $22.4 million, against a production budget of $6 million.

In the United States and Canada, The Prodigy was released on February 8, 2019, alongside The Lego Movie 2: The Second Part, Cold Pursuit and What Men Want, and was projected to gross $8–11 million from 2,530 theaters in its opening weekend. It made $2 million on its first day, including $350,000 from Thursday night previews. It went on to debut to $6 million, finishing sixth at the box office, although Deadline Hollywood noted given the film's $6 million production budget the studio was satisfied with the results and the film would likely net a profit.

=== Critical response ===
On review aggregator website Rotten Tomatoes, the film holds an approval rating of 44% based on 82 reviews, with an average rating of 5/10. The website's critical consensus reads, "The Prodigy doesn't take the bad seed genre to any truly new places, but for horror fans in search of an evil child to fear, it might still be worth a watch." On Metacritic, the film has a weighted average score of 45 out of 100, based on 18 critics, indicating "mixed or average reviews". Audiences polled by CinemaScore gave the film an average grade of "C+" on an A+ to F scale, while those at PostTrak gave it a 64% overall positive score and a 44% "definite recommend".
