= Miller & Son =

- Directed by: Asher Jelinsky
- Written by: Asher Jelinsky
- Produced by: Kate Chamuris
- Starring: Jesse James Keitel; Ryan Cutrona; Alexandra Grey; Travis Hammer
- Cinematography: Robert Nachman
- Edited by: Selinda Tian Jz Zhou
- Production company: AFI Conservatory
- Release dates: April 14, 2019 (Atlanta Film and Video Festival)
- Running time: 21 minutes
- Country: United States

Miller & Son is a 2019 live action short film directed by non-binary filmmaker Asher Jelinsky during their directing MFA studies at the AFI Conservatory. This short film explores the feeling of compartmentalization by portraying the life of a transgender mechanic, performed by then-non-binary actress Jesse James Keitel. It has been selected and awarded at several film festivals including Clermont-Ferrand International Short Film Festival, St. Louis International Film Festival where it won the Oscar Qualifying Best Live-Action Short Award, the BAFTA Student Film Awards where it won Best Live Action, and the Student Academy Awards where it won its second Oscar Qualifying Award with the gold medal for "Best Narrative" (Domestic).

== Plot ==
A trans woman mechanic lives between running her family's auto shop during the day and expressing her femininity at night, until an unforeseen event threatens the balance of her compartmentalized life.

== Awards ==
Since its launch, the film has received numerous awards, and selected in more than 60 festivals around the world.

Year	Presenter/Festival	Award/Category	Status
2019	Student Academy Awards	Best Narrative (Domestic)	Won
2019	BAFTA Student Film Awards	Best Live Action Short Film	Won
2019	St. Louis International Film Festival	Best Live-Action Short	Won
2019	Cannes Lions International Festival of Creativity	Gold Screen Young Director Award (Film School 6 mins and over)	Won
2019	Clermont-Ferrand Film Festival	International Competition	Nominated
2019	Rhode Island International Film Festival	Best Student Film	Nominated
2019	Ashland Independent Film Festival	Jury and Audience Award for "Best Narrative Short"	Won
2019	FilmOut San Diego	Outstanding Artistic Achievement	Won
2019	Nevada City Film Festival	Best Performance	Won
2019	North Carolina Gay & Lesbian Film Festival	Best Long-Form Dramatic Short	Won
