= Survivor 51 =

Season of television series

- Season 51
- Presented by: Jeff Probst
- No. of days: 26
- No. of castaways: 21
- Location: Mamanuca Islands, Fiji
- No. of episodes: 9

Release
- Original network: CBS
- Original release: September 23, 2026 – present

Additional information
- Filming dates: April 18 – May 13, 2026

Season chronology
- ← Previous; In the Hands of the Fans

Survivor 51 is the 51st season of the American competitive reality television series Survivor. It premiered on September 23, 2026 on CBS in the United States. It was the 19th consecutive season to be filmed in the Mamanuca Islands in Fiji.

== Format ==
Survivor is a reality television show based on the Swedish show Expedition Robinson, created by Mark Burnett and Charlie Parsons. The series follows a number of participants isolated in a remote location, where they must provide food, fire, and shelter. One by one, a participant is removed from the series by plurality vote, with challenges held to give a reward (ranging from living- and food-related prizes to a car) and immunity from being voted out of the series. The last remaining player receives a prize of $1,000,000.

== Contestants ==
The twenty-one castaways were officially announced on August 26, 2026, starting out with an "uneven men and women"—eleven women and ten men—said host and producer Jeff Probst in The Hollywood Reporter interview. This is the first Survivor season to start with an odd number of castaways since Survivor: Fiji. Notable cast members this season include actor Devin Way, voice actress Ana Sani, and former WWE NXT wrestler Brady Booker.

List of Survivor 51 contestants
Contestant	Age	From	Tribe				Finish	
Contestant	Age	From	Original	Post-mutiny	Switched	Merged	Placement	Day
Aaliyah Puglia	24	Providence, Rhode Island	Toka				1st voted out	Day 3
Ana Sani	34	Toronto, Ontario	Savu				2nd voted out	Day 5
Rob Antonson	40	Cumberland, Rhode Island	Savu				Quit	Day 6
Patt Cannaday	33	Washington, D.C.	Toka	Toka			3rd voted out	Day 7
Jenna Doore	30	Toledo, Ohio	Toka	Toka	Savu		4th voted out	Day 9
Alexis Levine	34	Atlanta, Georgia	Savu	Savu	Savu		5th voted out	Day 10
Linnea Capobianco	25	Jersey City, New Jersey	Savu	Savu	Dina		6th voted out	Day 10
Ori Jean-Charles	27	Spring Valley, New York	Savu	Savu	Savu		7th voted out	Day 12
Brady Booker	27	Knoxville, Tennessee	Toka	Toka	Toka	Tovuto	8th voted out Withdrew from jury (Note: On Day 15, Brady withdrew from the jury following an injury he received earlier in the game.)	Day 14
Kristin Flickinger	49	Santa Barbara, California	Savu	Savu	Toka	Tovuto	9th & 10th voted out 1st & 2nd jury members	Day 15
Danny Kilby	30	London, Ontario	Toka	Toka	Dina	Tovuto	9th & 10th voted out 1st & 2nd jury members	Day 15
Lewis Kelly	28	Corozal, Puerto Rico	Toka	Toka	Dina	Tovuto	Eliminated (Note: Lewis volunteered to participate in the "Million Dollar Coin Flip" and therefore had to flip a coin at Tribal Council; he lost, and was eliminated from the game.); 3rd jury member	Day 17
Cristian Chavez	26	Salt Lake City, Utah	Savu	Savu	Dina	Tovuto		
Sharonda Cox	34	Richmond, Kentucky	Savu	Savu	Dina	Tovuto		
Carter Krull	24	Sioux Falls, South Dakota	Savu	Toka	Toka	Tovuto		
Angelica "Jelly" Loblack	29	Bloomington, Indiana	Toka	Toka	Savu	Tovuto		
Eric Macksoud	34	Windsor Locks, Connecticut	Savu	Savu	Dina	Tovuto		
Maggie Nestor	40	Charles Town, West Virginia	Toka	Toka	Toka	Tovuto		
Thien An Nguyen	24	Fort Worth, Texas	Toka	Toka	Toka	Tovuto		
Mike Pinsky	32	New York City, New York	Toka	Toka	Toka	Tovuto		
Devin Way	33	Los Angeles, California	Toka	Toka	Savu	Tovuto		

== Season summary ==
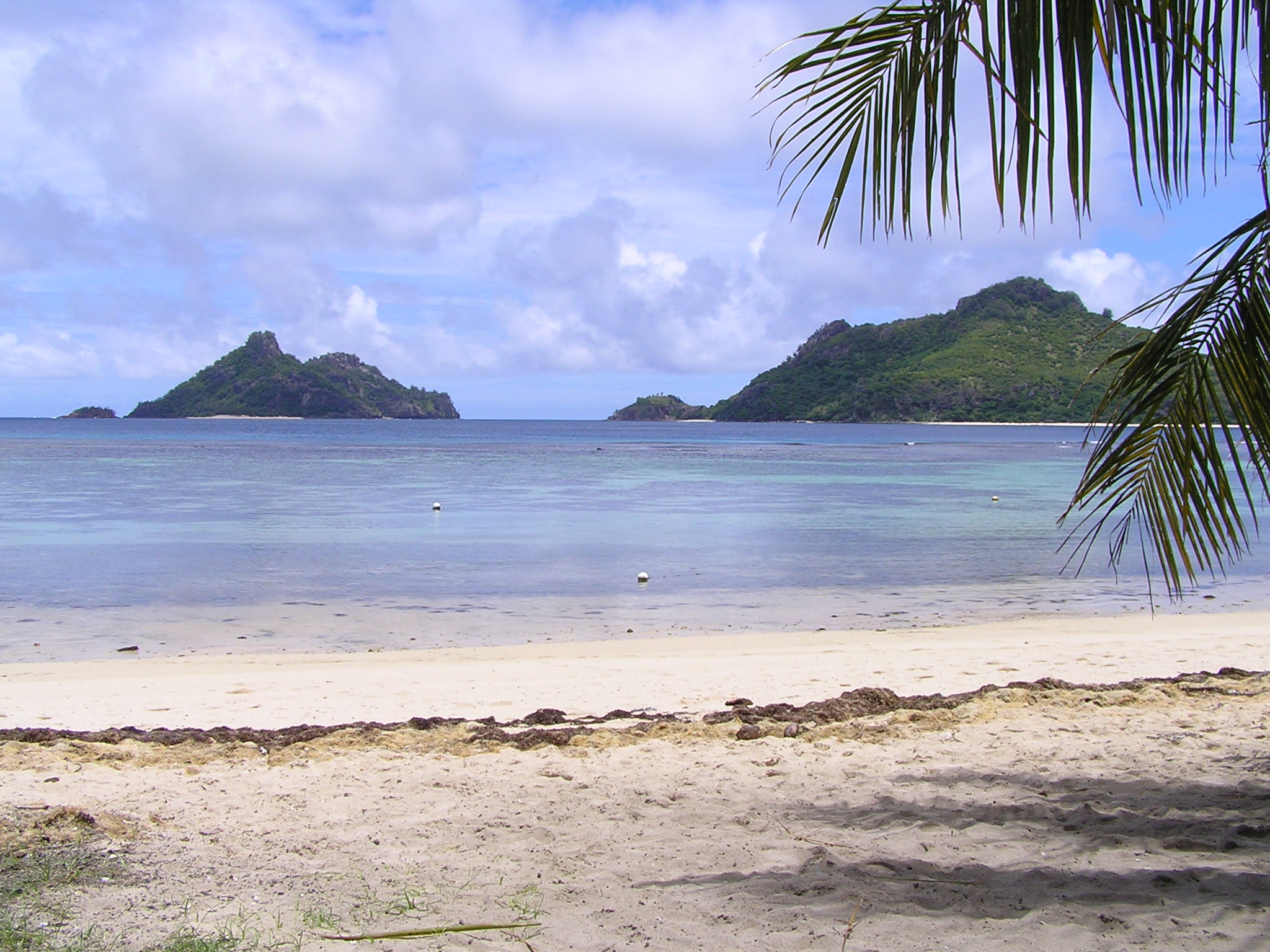
The season filmed in the Mamanuca Islands of Fiji.

Survivor 51 season summary
Episode			Challenge winner(s)		Journey	Eliminated	
No.	Title	Air date	Reward	Immunity	Journey	Tribe	Player
1	"Permanent Uncertainty"	September 23, 2026	None	Savu	Lewis (None) (Note: Lewis volunteered to go on a solo journey. As a result, he was sent to Exile Island and later joined the tribe that lost the subsequent Immunity Challenge: Toka.)	Toka	Aaliyah
2	"Weaponized Honesty"	September 30, 2026	Toka	Toka	None	Savu	Ana
3	"What I'm Smellin' Is Stinky"	October 7, 2026	None		None	Savu	Rob
3	"What I'm Smellin' Is Stinky"	October 7, 2026	Savu		Carter (Savu)	Toka	Patt
3	"What I'm Smellin' Is Stinky"	October 7, 2026	Savu		Devin (Toka)	Toka	Patt
4	"That's the Magic of Survivor"	October 14, 2026	Dina		None	Savu	Jenna
4	"That's the Magic of Survivor"	October 14, 2026	Toka		None	Savu	Jenna
5	"Not Here to Get a Pedicure"	October 21, 2026	Toka (Note: This challenge was for reward and immunity. All the members of Toka partook in the reward except Maggie, who was selected to go on a journey to visit one of the opposing tribes.)		Maggie (Toka)	Savu	Alexis
5	"Not Here to Get a Pedicure"	October 21, 2026	Toka		Maggie (Toka)	Dina	Linnea
6	"I Love Crying"	October 28, 2026	None	Toka	Kristin (Toka)	Savu	Ori
6	"I Love Crying"	October 28, 2026	None	Toka	Ori (Savu)	Savu	Ori
6	"I Love Crying"	October 28, 2026	None	Dina	Ori (Savu)	Savu	Ori
6	"I Love Crying"	October 28, 2026	None	Dina	Sharonda (Dina)	Savu	Ori
7	"The Girl at the Prom"	November 4, 2026	Brady, Carter, Devin, Eric, Jelly, Kilby, Lewis, Maggie, Mike, Thien An	Mike	None	Tovuto	Brady
8	"Load the Ark, Two by Two"	November 11, 2026	Lewis & Sharonda (Note: On Day 15, castaways were paired up and would win the challenge as a pair. In addition, one of those same pairings would be voted out together, although votes would be cast on an individual basis.) [Jelly, Kristin] (Note: In addition to immunity, Lewis and Sharonda won reward for themselves and two other castaways of their choice; they chose Jelly and Kristin.)	Lewis & Sharonda	Cristian	Tovuto	Kilby & Kristin
9	"Wilder Than a Cat in a Bathtub"	November 18, 2026	Devin, Eric, Lewis, Mike, Thien An	Carter	None	Tovuto	Lewis
10	"Sorting Hogs"	November 25, 2026					
11	"My Fangs Feel A Little Sharp Today"	December 2, 2026					
12	"My Time Is Up"	December 9, 2026					

== Episodes ==
No. overall	No. in season	Title	Day(s)	Rating/share (18–49)	Original release date	U.S. viewers (millions)
728	1	"Permanent Uncertainty"	Days 1–3	0.8/12	September 23, 2026	4.38
Jeff Probst welcomes the 21 new castaways to Survivor and reveals that they will be playing with "permanent uncertainty". The castaways are then marooned together on one beach with limited supplies and no set tribal lines. The players discover a sign informing them that not everyone will start the game together, as they must agree on one person to begin the game on their own. Lewis volunteers to go on the journey.: Journey: Lewis goes on a journey and is sent to Exile Island. On Day 2, he must chop down a thick mast within a set time limit to claim the Hidden Immunity Idol at the top. However, Lewis fails to chop down the mast before time runs out and is unsuccessful in earning the idol.; Back on the beach, a helicopter arrives. Aaliyah, Devin, Jelly, and Ori solidify an alliance, dubbed the "Helicopter Alliance", bringing up Sharonda as a fifth member. The helicopter drops off a bag containing their tribe buffs, revealing the new tribe divisions: Savu consisting of Alexis, Ana, Carter, Cristian, Eric, Kristin, Linnea, Ori, Rob, and Sharonda, and Toka consisting of Aaliyah, Brady, Devin, Jelly, Jenna, Kilby, Maggie, Mike, Patt, and Thien An. Each tribe nominates one member to negotiate with the other tribe for supplies. Kristin and Kilby are selected from their respective tribes and agree to split the supplies. Savu takes the fishing gear, flint, machete, and pot, while Toka takes the camping and shelter-building supplies. At Toka, Jenna struggles to open up to her tribemates. Aaliyah, Devin, and Jelly reconnect, solidifying their half of the Helicopter Alliance. Brady and Devin grow closer and discuss targeting Jenna first. Devin also spreads around camp that Jenna may be lying about her profession. At Savu, Ori and Sharonda solidify their half of the Helicopter Alliance, hoping to keep their connection a secret. Eric begins to rub his fellow tribemates the wrong way, which Rob takes advantage of by painting a bigger target on him. The next morning, Rob finds a Hidden Immunity Idol. Before the Immunity Challenge, Probst welcomes the castaways to the "Open Era", explaining that anything from past Survivor seasons could be brought into play. The castaways are informed that the coin flip from Survivor 50: In the Hands of the Fans is back in play. The coin flip could increase the prize pot to $2,000,000 or eliminate the player who chooses to flip the coin. If the player is eliminated, the money rolls over to the subsequent season.: Immunity Challenge: Tribes must race through intersecting obstacles to untie five bags containing balls. Once they retrieve all five balls, they must push them through a vertical chute to release a key. Players then use the key to unlock six heavy crates and push them underneath a cargo net to create a staircase. After all tribe members climb the staircase, two players must assemble a logo puzzle to win immunity.; Savu wins immunity, sending Toka to the first Tribal Council. Devin continues to target Jenna. Some players believe Aaliyah should go after her performance caused the tribe to fall behind during the challenge. Aaliyah and Jelly bring up Brady as a potential future target to Jenna and Patt over his behavior. Believing Jenna did good in the challenge and wanting her to stay, Patt privately informs Jenna that she could be the one going home. Jenna tells Brady about Aaliyah's criticisms of him, which causes him to target Aaliyah. He and Devin disagree over who to vote for. At Tribal Council, Jenna admits that she struggled to open up during the first few days. Devin boldly reveals that he is voting for Jenna, causing the tribe to whisper and scramble to figure out how to vote. After accidentally saying there is two targets, Patt reveals that the other is Aaliyah, who is shocked at this. Both Aaliyah and Jenna play their Shots in the Dark, but neither is successful. Aaliyah is voted out in a 6–2 vote over Jenna.
729	2	"Weaponized Honesty"	Days 3–5	0.8/11	September 30, 2026	4.69
At Toka, Jenna is grateful to still be in the game, while Brady and Devin discuss their closeness despite being on opposite sides of the vote. Lewis leaves Exile Island and joins Toka. The following day, Brady accidentally chops a piece of his thumb while using the axe. After receiving medical attention, he is treated and allowed to remain in the game. At Savu, Ana and Alexis discuss Linnea and Sharonda as the tribe's biggest threats. Carter talks to Ana about how he believes Alexis is a threat, being cut off when Alexis walks up to them. Ana lies to Alexis that they were talking about popcorn, which Alexis doesn't believe. This causes Alexis to throw Ana under the bus to Linnea and Sharonda.: Reward Challenge: Tribes divide into pairs, with one member of each pair blindfolded. Their partner must guide them over a hinged ramp and through a net obstacle. Next, two blindfolded members must unwind a rope from a log, releasing three sandbags. Finally, three tribe members must assemble a pole and hang the sandbags from a hook. The first tribe to finish wins a reward consisting of a hammock, a mat, pillows, and two tarps.; During the challenge, Kristin injures her foot. After a close finish, Toka wins the reward. Savu returns to camp with Rob expressing frustration with Linnea's performance during the challenge. Toka celebrates their reward win, giving Jelly an opportunity to search for a Hidden Immunity Idol, which she finds. Jelly and Patt discuss forming an alliance with Brady, Devin, and Mike.: Immunity Challenge: Tribes must swim out to a floating platform and release a massive Survivor whale. They must then maneuver the whale and all tribe members over a barrel before dragging it onto the beach beneath an obstacle. Once there, three tribe members must roll three balls down a long table, landing one in each of three holes. The first tribe to finish wins immunity.; Toka wins their first immunity challenge, sending Savu to Tribal Council. At Savu, several tribe members discuss voting out Eric, and Ana volunteers to serve as the decoy vote to prevent Eric from suspecting he is the target as well as build trust with the other tribemates. Linnea and Sharonda overhear Cater and Ori talking about hunting crabs, mistaking their conversation for strategy talk. Rob struggles with being away from his family and considers sacrificing his own game to save Eric. At Tribal Council, Rob pulls Eric aside before the vote to warn him that the tribe is targeting him. However, Ana is voted out in a 6–4 vote over Eric, with Rob unsuccessfully attempting to cast a vote for himself.
730	3	"What I'm Smellin' is Stinky"	Days 5–7	0.8/10	October 7, 2026	4.60
At Savu, Carter is confused and upset after finding himself on the wrong side of the vote. Rob begins to complain of pain in one of his legs and asks medical to examine him. Medical finds a cut on Rob's foot, but ultimately find nothing that would warrant them to pull him from the game. Despite this, Rob remains worried about infection and quits the game anyway. In confessionals, several of Rob's tribemates suspect his true reasons for quitting was due to his failures at the previous Tribal Council. Before leaving, Rob bequeaths his Hidden Immunity Idol to Carter. At Toka, Lewis worries about his standing in the tribe after arriving three days late. Devin suspects that Kilby is playing a rat-like game. Patt informs her alliance of Brady, Devin, Jelly, and Mike that Kilby talked trash about Brady to her.: Journey: Each tribe must send a member to visit the opposing tribe, with Savu sending Carter and Toka sending Devin. Once aboard the boat, they each receive a clue to an advantage hidden on the opposing tribe's beach. However, the journey comes with an additional decision, as each castaway may choose to mutiny and remain with the opposing tribe as a new member.; At Savu, Devin pulls Sharonda and Ori aside to solidify their Helicopter Alliance. Devin and Sharonda find the extra vote advantage at the water well. At Toka, Carter informs the tribe that Linnea and Sharonda are running Savu. While Carter is away, Lewis searches Carter's bag and discovers the clue to the advantage, prompting Brady and Maggie to find and argue over it. After grabbing it, Brady ultimately gives the extra vote advantage to Maggie. While unsuccessfully looking for the advantage, Carter fails to return to the boat on time and is forced to mutiny to Toka.: Reward/Immunity Challenge: Tribe members must crawl through a pile of wood shavings to collect keys. Two players then use the keys to unlock heavy chains wrapped around a crate and retrieve a ladder. Using the ladder, they climb to the top of a tower, where they hoist a bag of coconuts and toss it down the other side to retrieve a key hidden inside. The tribes must then get all their members up a steep platform, where two players assemble a hanging anchor puzzle. The first tribe to finish wins immunity and four egg-laying hens.; During the challenge, Toka squanders its substantial lead during the puzzle, allowing Savu to win immunity and reward. At Toka, Devin and Kilby attempt to resolve their differences, but the conversation instead solidifies Devin's desire to vote Kilby out. Meanwhile, Lewis aligns with Carter. The two newcomers emerge as swing votes, with the other tribe members being divided between Brady, Devin, Jelly, Mike, and Patt on one side and Jenna, Kilby, Maggie, and Thien An on the other. Thien An proposes voting out Patt, seeing her as a social threat. She attempts to recruit Brady, but he remains convinced that Kilby will go. At Tribal Council, Patt is voted out in a 6–5 vote, with Lewis and Carter choosing to go with Thien An's plan.
731	4	"That's the Magic of Survivor"	Days 7–9	0.8/11	October 14, 2026	4.63
Returning to camp, Brady and his alliance are hurt and upset by Patt's blindside. They search for answers about the vote flip, while the others quietly celebrate taking down the larger alliance. On Day 8, Probst announces a tribe swap that will divide the remaining castaways into three tribes. Alexis, Devin, Jelly, Jenna, and Ori join Savu; Brady, Carter, Kristin, Maggie, Mike, and Thien An join Toka; and Cristian, Eric, Kilby, Lewis, Linnea, and Sharonda form the new Dina tribe. At Dina, the tribe must start from scratch by building a new camp. Kilby and Eric bond over their difficult starts on their previous tribes, while Lewis struggles with feeling sick and tired. At the new Toka beach, Kristin works to get to know her new tribemates as the only newcomer to the group. She also attempts to smooth things over with Carter following his mutiny. Carter and Thien An secretly form an alliance with hopes of reaching the end together. At Savu, Jenna attempts to smooth things over with Devin, hoping they can remain loyal to original Toka and vote out Alexis or Ori. Meanwhile, sparks fly between Jelly and Ori.: Reward/Immunity Challenge: One tribe member closest to the ocean must collect a bucket of water. They then have to work with their tribe to pass the water to each other by throwing it in the air and catching it in their buckets, with the final member eventually dumping the remaining water into a container which, when filled, would drop and release a ball. Two tribe members must then use the ball to complete a circular maze. The first two tribes to finish wins immunity, along with a full Survivor coffee kit for first place and a jar of iced coffee for second place.; The new Dina tribe finishes first, with Toka coming in second and sending Savu to Tribal Council. Back at camp, Alexis attempts to secure her safety by convincing Ori to vote out either Jelly or Devin, unaware of the Helicopter Alliance between the three. However, Devin continues to view Jenna as the better target over Alexis, while Jelly believes the opposite. At Tribal Council, Jenna is ultimately voted out in a 4–1 vote.
732	5	"Not Here to Get a Pedicure"	Days 9–10	0.9/11	October 21, 2026	4.97
Devin celebrates successfully blindsiding Jenna. Devin, Ori, and Alexis bond by sharing personal stories. Meanwhile, at Dina, Lewis recovers from his illness and attempts to ingratiate himself with the original four Savu members. Kilby and Eric continue to bond. At Toka, Thien An wants to target Mike, but Maggie and Carter want to target Kristin first. Brady is frustrated by Maggie's reluctance to work with him, despite having given her the extra vote.: Reward/Immunity Challenge: One tribe member must climb a ladder, retrieve a buoy, and jump into the ocean, followed by another tribe member. A third tribe member must then dive down to retrieve a third buoy. Those tribe members must then all balance the buoys on a disc and cross the parallel balance beam together, where a fourth tribe member collects them and must throw them onto different targets. The first tribe to finish wins sweet treats and immunity.; Toka easily wins, meaning that Dina and Savu will be going to Tribal Council. At Toka, they learn that one of them must sacrifice their place in the reward to instead travel to a different tribe. Carter randomly draws Maggie's name to go on the journey. On the boat, she learns that she can give one person an extra vote, to which she chooses to visit Dina because she is worried that her allies Kilby and Lewis are in danger. At Savu, Alexis wants to target Devin and attempts to convince Jelly to join her and Ori in this. Jelly is conflicted between turning on the Helicopter Alliance and voting out a person of color or voting out a woman, as no man has been voted out yet. At Tribal Council, Jelly ultimately stays loyal to the Helicopter Alliance and Alexis is blindsided in a 3–1 vote. At Dina, Lewis makes an attempt to save himself by pretending his Irish wedding ring is a new style of advantage called the "blood ring" which will tie his fate in the game to a player of his choosing. He gives the ring to Sharonda, but Cristian recognizes it from a description Lewis had given about Irish wedding rings days prior, revealing the lie. Maggie arrives and has individual meetings with each Dina member, and quickly becomes worried about the strong alliance of the original four Savu members. Before she leaves, Maggie gives Kilby and Lewis an extra vote each: the one she was tasked with giving away, and the one she and Brady found at Toka. She requests that they vote for Linnea at Tribal Council. Kilby is conflicted due to his close relationship with Eric and knows that Lewis will be targeted first. At Tribal Council, Kilby tells the original Savu members about the advantage that Maggie gave him. However, he sides with Lewis and Maggie by using his extra vote and tying the vote 4–4 between Lewis and Linnea. Following the second tied vote, Probst informs the castaways that they must come to a unanimous decision or Lewis and Linnea will become safe and the other castaways will have to draw rocks, where the odd rock drawn would be eliminated instead. After Kilby once again refuses to vote out Lewis; Sharonda, Cristian, and Eric decide to change their votes to Linnea to avoid drawing rocks. This leads to Linnea becoming the sixth player voted out.
733	6	"I Love Crying"	Days 10–12	0.87/11	October 28, 2026	4.67
At Dina, Eric is angered by Linnea's elimination and denounces Kilby. Cristian, meanwhile, realizes that original Savu members have been voted out at the past three Tribal Councils and plans to flip to Lewis and Kilby to take advantage of their wider allegiances. At Toka, Thien An continues to target Mike, whose behavior frustrates the other tribe members. Brady and Maggie disagree over how she used the extra vote they found. At Savu, Jelly, Devin, and Ori worry that they may have to turn against one another if they lose immunity. The tribes each find a note instructing them to select one member to attend a summit, where they must depart for an unknown task. Savu chooses Ori. At Dina, Cristian rigs the rock draw to ensure that he, Lewis, and Kilby are not selected, resulting in Sharonda being chosen. Toka chooses Kristin, despite Mike also expressing interest in attending the summit.: Summit: Kristin, Ori, and Sharonda arrive at the summit, where they learn that they must choose one person to go to exile in exchange for a "tethered idol," which can only be used on the two players who are not selected. The other two players will return to their tribes with food. Kristin volunteers and is selected for exile. There, she learns that the tethered idol will transform into a regular idol if both Sharonda and Ori are eliminated.; Immunity Challenge: Tribes must race to untangle themselves from ropes before using them to pull a sled loaded with sandbags toward them. They must then throw the sandbags one at a time to knock puzzle pieces off a platform before assembling the pieces to complete a puzzle. The first two tribes to finish win immunity.; Toka and Dina finish the challenge almost simultaneously after Savu squanders its chances at the puzzle. Jelly refuses to consider voting out Devin, leaving Ori desperate. She reveals her idol to prevent them from considering flipping on her. Ori argues to Devin that he and Jelly are viewed as an inseparable pair and pose a significant threat. At Tribal Council, Ori plays his Shot in the Dark but is unsuccessful, and he is voted out unanimously.
734	7	"The Girl at the Prom"	Days 12–14	0.85/12	November 4, 2026	4.96
The remaining castaways learn that the three tribes are merging into one.: Reward Challenge: Only ten players will earn a spot at the merge feast. To qualify, each castaway must swallow two live grubs; the first ten to finish are allowed to eat. Brady and Eric immediately volunteer, with Brady finishing first and later eating a fourth grub for good measure. Kristin and Cristian opt out early, while Kilby narrowly beats Sharonda for the final spot. As a result, Kristin, Cristian, and Sharonda are sent back to camp while the other ten enjoy the feast.; During the feast, the five remaining Savu members realize they hold a numerical disadvantage over the eight Toka members. Back at camp, Kristin solidifies her bond with Sharonda by handing over her tethered idol, explaining that Sharonda now has complete control over when it is played. At the feast, Mike becomes a central figure, with multiple players identifying him as the consensus target. However, Kilby and Brady reaffirm their loyalty to one another and begin gathering numbers to protect themselves.: Immunity Challenge: The castaways have to balance a whale statue on the end of a long pole while standing on a beam that gradually narrows beneath them. Sharonda and Thien An are the first to drop, followed by Eric and Cristian. In the final three, Kristin falls, leaving Mike and Lewis to battle for the necklace. Mike ultimately outlasts Lewis, winning immunity and guaranteeing his safety at the first merged Tribal Council.; With Mike now immune, the original Toka group initially considers targeting Eric, while Mike and Jelly push to eliminate Brady. Tensions between Brady and Mike escalate after Brady accuses Mike of flipping the vote behind his back, leading to a confrontation. At a live Tribal Council, the target remains fluid until the votes are cast. Ultimately, Brady is voted out in a 9–4 vote over Eric, with the four votes against Eric coming from Brady, Lewis, Thien An, and Carter. Brady becomes the eighth person voted out of the season and the first member of the jury, leaving twelve castaways in the game.
735	8	"Load the Ark, Two by Two"	Days 14–15	0.84	November 11, 2026	4.80
Carter creates the "Salt Alliance" consisting of Kilby, Lewis, Cristian, Maggie, and Thien An to counteract their blindside. He shares his idol with Cristian to solidify their new connection. Mike continues to be the consensus target. The castaways must pair up for the immunity challenge; the chosen pairs are: Maggie & Mike, Carter & Cristian, Devin & Jelly, Kilby & Kristin, Eric & Thien An, and Lewis & Sharonda. Before the challenge, the castaways learn that Brady is no longer on the jury, as he left to follow up on his injured thumb. Thus, the first and second jury members will be determined that night.: Reward/Immunity Challenge: The challenge is then split into three stages, with only a limited number of pairs moving on from each stage. The winners of the first stage gain an advantage in the following ones. In the first stage, the pairs must use their feet to balance a ball on the end of a beam, with the first two to drop being eliminated. In the second stage, the pairs must race back and forth through a teeter tunnel carrying bags of blocks and then slide those blocks along a shuffleboard into the target. As winners of the first challenge, Carter & Cristian had fewer bags. In the final stage, the pairs must race across balance beams to stack their retrieved blocks on a wobbly platform, with the first to complete winning immunity.; Lewis & Sharonda win immunity and the reward, which they choose to share with Jelly and Kristin, to Eric's annoyance. They also choose to send Cristian on a journey.: Journey: Cristian goes on a journey and discovers that he has lost his vote. To win it back, he must find the clue to the location of his vote, and possibly win an extra vote as well. Cristian cuts a rope releasing a trough full of buoys into the ocean, where he successfully deciphers letters written on them to reveal the message "Dig Under Treemail". Back at camp, Cristian retrieves both his vote and an extra vote from this location.; Despite wanting to target either Mike or Eric, the Salt Alliance do not want to lose Maggie or Thien An. Carter attempts to gather the numbers against Devin & Jelly, as an obvious duo working against them. Meanwhile, Devin & Jelly want to target Carter & Cristian, which Lewis informs Carter of. Carter convinces Devin & Jelly that the target is Kristin. Thien An tells Sharonda the real target, which she then informs Devin & Jelly about, although Jelly is still unsure about whether to play her idol. At Tribal Council, the target is still uncertain despite the consensus vote being Devin & Jelly. Cristian gives Eric his extra vote as a sign of trust, as he intends to play his Shot in the Dark in case Devin or Jelly has an idol. Despite the extra vote only being valid for this Tribal Council, Eric does not use it. Both Kristin and Cristian play their Shots in the Dark; whilst Kristin is unsuccessful, Cristian's hits, granting him and Carter safety without playing their idol. Jelly plays her idol, negating eight votes, and Kilby & Kristin are sent home by one vote.
736	9	"Wilder Than a Cat in a Bathtub"	TBA	0.79	November 18, 2026	4.51
Following the previous Tribal Council, Jelly and Devin celebrate surviving the vote after Jelly played her idol to nullify eight votes against them. Cristian states that his successful Shot in the Dark was the biggest move of the season, though his ally Carter is unaware that Cristian has already revealed the existence of Carter's idol to Sharonda. Eric returns Cristian's expired extra vote, which Cristian keeps as a potential bluff. With Jelly's idol now out of the game, the castaways embark on a tribe-wide hunt for a new hidden immunity idol. Maggie pushes her allies to search at dawn, but no one locates the idol. Devin, however, uses the parchment and wrapping from Jelly's old idol to plant a fake idol in the jungle, hoping someone will find it and mistakenly believe they are safe. Devin later attempts to guide Maggie toward the decoy, but she fails to notice it, forcing Devin to retrieve it himself to maintain the illusion.: Reward Challenge: The tribe is divided into two teams of five for a reward challenge. The purple team consists of Mike, Devin, Eric, Lewis, and Thien An, while the yellow team consists of Sharonda, Carter, Jelly, Maggie, and Cristian. The challenge requires players to clear a heavy rope, push a sled, unlock sandbags, and launch them via slingshot at three targets. The teams remain neck-and-neck until the slingshot stage, where Lewis outperforms Carter to secure victory for the purple team. The winners enjoy a Fijian helicopter ride to a private beach with a fried chicken feast.; Immunity Challenge: The castaways hold themselves up on a wooden slide above water for as long as possible. Carter and Lewis outlast the rest of the field, enduring over thirty minutes before Lewis finally loses his grip, granting Carter the immunity necklace.; Following the challenge, Cristian suggests to Sharonda that they target Lewis, viewing him as a physical and social threat. Jelly agrees and begins pitching Lewis's name to Eric, who positions himself as a swing vote between the two sides. Meanwhile, Jelly also floats Maggie as an alternative target, recognizing her strategic threat level, and both Devin and Mike are receptive to the idea. Thien An, still loyal to Lewis, locks her target onto Jelly in retaliation for her idol play. At Tribal Council, Jeff Probst reveals that the million-dollar coin flip will determine the outcome of the vote. One player must volunteer to flip a coin; if they call it correctly, they become immune from the vote and the season's grand prize is increased to two million dollars; if they call it incorrectly, they are eliminated and the prize remains at one million dollars. Multiple players initially express willingness to flip, but ultimately Devin and Lewis are the final candidates. Lewis, knowing he is the likely target, decides to take his fate into his own hands. The coin features fire on one side and water on the other. Lewis calls fire, but the coin lands on water, and Lewis is eliminated by the coin flip, becoming the third member of the jury.
737	10	"Sorting Hogs"	TBA	TBA	November 25, 2026	TBD
738	11	"My Fangs Feel A Little Sharp Today"	TBA	TBA	December 2, 2026	TBD
739	12	"My Time Is Up"	TBA	TBA	December 9, 2026	TBD

== Voting history ==
Survivor 51 voting history
	Original tribes			Post-mutiny tribes	Switched tribes								Merged tribe						
Episode	1	2	3		4	5						6	7	8	9	10	11	12	13
Day	3	5	6	7	9	10						12	14	15 (Note: On Day 15, castaways were paired up and would win the challenge as a pair. In addition, one of those same pairings would be voted out together, although votes would be cast on an individual basis.)	17				
Tribe	Toka	Savu	Savu	Toka	Savu	Savu	Dina					Savu	Tovuto	Tovuto	Tovuto				
Eliminated	Aaliyah	Ana	Rob	Patt	Jenna	Alexis	Tie (Note: The vote resulted in a tie. Per the rules, a second vote was held. As one of the castaways involved in the tie had used an advantage, all castaways were eligible to vote for those players who tied.)		Tie (Note: After two rounds of voting, Tribal Council remained tied. Per the rules, the non-tied castaways must come to a consensus as to whom to eliminate between the tied castaways, or else the tied castaways would then become immune and one of the remaining players would be eliminated by random draw.)		Linnea	Ori	Brady	Kilby & Kristin	Lewis				
Votes	6–2	6–4	Quit (Note: No vote; Rob chose to quit the game.)	6–5	4–1	3–1	4–4		4–4		Consensus (Note: Due to a deadlocked tie, the non-tied castaways had to come to a unanimous decision to vote out either Lewis or Linnea, or else Lewis and Linnea would become immune and one of the remaining castaways would be eliminated by random draw. They decided to eliminate Linnea.)	2–0	9–4	1–0–0 (Note: Jelly played a hidden immunity idol on herself; therefore, eight votes against her and Devin were not counted.) (Note: Cristian successfully played the Shot in the Dark; therefore one vote against him and Carter was not counted.)	None (Note: Lewis volunteered to participate in the "Million Dollar Coin Flip" at Tribal Council; he lost and was automatically eliminated from the game.)				
Voter	Vote																		
Carter		Eric		Patt									Eric	~~Devin & Jelly~~					
Cristian		Ana					Lewis		Lewis		Linnea		Brady	None (Note: This player played the Shot in the Dark, and as a result, had to sacrifice that night's vote.)					
Devin	Jenna			Kilby	Jenna	Alexis						Ori	Brady	Kilby & Kristin					
Eric		Ana					Lewis		Lewis		Linnea		Brady	~~Devin & Jelly~~					
Jelly	Jenna			Kilby	Jenna	Alexis						Ori	Brady	~~Carter & Cristian~~					
Maggie	Aaliyah			Patt									Brady	~~Devin & Jelly~~					
Mike	Aaliyah			Kilby									Brady	~~Devin & Jelly~~					
Sharonda		Ana					Lewis		Lewis		Linnea		Brady	~~Devin & Jelly~~					
Thien An	Aaliyah			Patt									Eric	~~Devin & Jelly~~					
Lewis	Exiled (Note: Lewis volunteered to go on a solo journey. As a result, he was sent to Exile Island and later joined the tribe that lost the subsequent Immunity Challenge: Toka.)			Patt			Linnea	Linnea (Note: This player played an extra vote advantage and was able to cast two ballots during a single vote.)	Linnea	Linnea (Note: The extra vote advantage carried over into the revote, allowing this player to cast two ballots once more.)	None		Eric	~~Devin & Jelly~~	Coin flip				
Kilby	Aaliyah			Patt			Linnea	Linnea	Linnea	Linnea	Linnea		Brady	~~Devin & Jelly~~					
Kristin		Ana											Brady	None					
Brady	Aaliyah			Kilby									Eric						
Ori		Eric			Jenna	Alexis						None							
Linnea		Ana					Lewis		Lewis		None								
Alexis		Ana			Jenna	Devin													
Jenna	None			Patt	Alexis														
Patt	Aaliyah			Kilby															
Rob		Eric	Quit																
Ana		Eric																	
Aaliyah	None																		

Jury vote
Episode	13		
Day	26		
Finalist	Finalist #1	Finalist #2	Finalist #3
Votes	TBA		
Juror	Vote		
Juror #9			
Juror #8			
Juror #7			
Juror #6			
Juror #5			
Juror #4			
Lewis			
Kilby			
Kristin			
Brady	None (Note: On Day 15, following his elimination, Brady decided not to join the jury, opting instead to attend to an injury he received earlier in the game.)		

== Production ==
Ahead of the season 50 premiere, CBS renewed Survivor for its 51st season on January 22, 2026. A trailer was played at the Survivor 50: In the Hands of the Fans reunion, revealing that there will be two starting tribes, a first since Winners at War.

The Maritime Safety Authority of Fiji issued a marine exclusion zone around the islands used by the series for filming on April 15, 2026. Eleven days prior, a cruise ship ran aground on a reef off of Monuriki, one of islands the show uses.

Host Jeff Probst declared Survivor 51 to be the beginning of "the open era", meaning that "anything that's ever happened on Survivor" in past seasons, including twists and advantages, "can happen again — at any time, in any order, without warning."
