= Disclosure (2020 American film) =

2020 American documentary film by Sam Feder

- Official poster
- Directed by: Sam Feder
- Produced by: Sam Feder; Amy Scholder
- Cinematography: Ava Benjamin Shorr
- Edited by: Stacy Goldate
- Music by: Francesco Le Metre
- Production companies: Field of Vision; Bow and Arrow Entertainment; Level Forward
- Distributed by: Netflix
- Release dates: January 27, 2020 (Sundance); June 19, 2020 (United States)
- Running time: 100 minutes
- Country: United States
- Language: English

Disclosure, originally subtitled Disclosure: Trans Lives on Screen, is a 2020 American documentary film directed and produced by Sam Feder. The film follows an in-depth look at Hollywood's depiction of transgender people and the impact of their stories on transgender lives and American culture. It had its world premiere at the Sundance Film Festival on January 27, 2020. It was released on Netflix on June 19, 2020.

== Synopsis ==
The film follows an in-depth look at Hollywood's depiction of transgender people and the impact of their stories on transgender lives and American culture. It features many famous transgender people in the film industry such as, Laverne Cox, Susan Stryker, Alexandra Billings, Jamie Clayton, Chaz Bono, Alexandra Grey, Yance Ford, Trace Lysette, Jazzmun, Michaela Jaé Rodriguez, Angelica Ross, Jen Richards, Elliot Fletcher, Brian Michael Smith, Sandra Caldwell, Candis Cayne, Jessica Crockett, Zackary Drucker, Lilly Wachowski, Ser Anzoategui, Michael D. Cohen, Zeke Smith, and Leo Sheng. It takes the audience through a history lesson using films and television shows to show how damaging and inaccurate the depiction and ideas of transgender people were displayed throughout, mostly, American cinema. Some of these examples used include Ace Ventura: Pet Detective, Bosom Buddies, Tootsie, Victor Victoria, To Kill a Mockingbird, and much more. Disclosure provides a direct conversation between transgender people and Hollywood by showcasing both sides of the conversation with direct examples in film history.

== Cast ==
- Laverne Cox
- Michaela Jaé Rodriguez
- Angelica Ross
- Susan Stryker
- Alexandra Billings
- Jamie Clayton
- Chaz Bono
- Alexandra Grey
- Yance Ford
- Trace Lysette
- Jazzmun
- Jen Richards
- Elliot Fletcher
- Brian Michael Smith
- Sandra Caldwell
- Candis Cayne
- Jessica Crockett
- Zackary Drucker
- Lilly Wachowski
- Ser Anzoategui
- Michael D. Cohen
- Zeke Smith
- Leo Sheng
- Marquise Vilsón
- Bianca Leigh
- Tiq Milan
- Rain Valdez
- Nick Adams
- Chase Strangio
- Tre'vell Anderson
- Mickey R. Mahoney

== Release ==
The film had its world premiere at the Sundance Film Festival on January 27, 2020. Shortly after, Netflix acquired distribution rights to the film and released it on the platform on June 19, 2020.

== Critical response ==
Disclosure received positive reviews from film critics. As of October 2021, it holds a 98% approval rating on review aggregator website Rotten Tomatoes, based on 55 reviews. It also has an average of 8.2/10. The site's critics consensus reads: "Disclosure engrossingly illuminates the history and effects of the way transgender lives are portrayed on screen – and outlines how much progress still needs to be made."

== Awards and nominations ==
Year	Award	Category	Nominees	Result
2019	Frameline San Francisco International LGBTQ Film Festival	Frameline Completion Fund	Sam Feder	Won
2020	Indiana Film Journalists Association, US	Best Documentary	Disclosure	Nominated
2020	International Online Cinema Awards	Best Documentary	Sam Feder	Nominated
2021	GALECA: The Society of LGBTQ Entertainment Critics of 2021 Dorian Awards	Documentary of the Year, LGBT Documentary of the Year	Disclosure	Won
2021	International Documentary Association	Best Editing	Stacy Goldate	Nominated
2021	GLAAD Media Award	Outstanding Documentary	Disclosure	Won

== See also ==
- The Celluloid Closet
