= Devin Way =

American actor and model (born 1992)

- Born: May 31, 1992 (age 34); Lufkin, Texas, U.S
- Occupations: Actor; model
- Years active: 2008–present
- Television: Grey's Anatomy; Queer as Folk; Sistas; Survivor 51
- Relatives: 12 siblings
- Modeling information
- Height: 6 ft 1 in (1.85 m)
- Hair color: Black
- Eye color: Brown
- Agency: Kim Dawson Agency

Devin Way (born May 31, 1992) is an American actor and model. He starred in the Peacock drama series Queer as Folk and in 2024 joined the cast of BET comedy-drama series, Sistas.

== Life and career ==
Way was born in Lufkin, Texas, and graduated from the Central High School in 2010. He later began modeling and in 2012 won Kim Dawson Agency model search. In 2019 he was cast in a recurring role as Dr. Blake Simms in the ABC medical drama series, Grey's Anatomy. He also appeared in an episode of Station 19 in 2020. In 2021, Way was cast as one of leads in the Peacock drama series Queer as Folk, a re-imagining of the Channel 4 1999 British TV series Queer as Folk. The series received positive reviews from critics but was canceled after a single season. In January 2024, Way was cast in a series regular role as Jordan Williams in the BET comedy-drama series, Sistas replacing Sean Sagar who originally played the role during season 6. In 2026, Way was announced as a contestant on Survivor 51.

== Personal life ==
Way is openly gay.

== Filmography ==
Year	Title	Role	Notes
2008	David & Fatima	Jerusalem Nightclub Patron	
2019–2020	Grey's Anatomy	Dr. Blake Simms	8 episodes
2020	Station 19	Dr. Blake Simms	Episode: "I Know This Bar"
2020	Almost True	Boyfriend	Short film
2021	The Match	Jayden	Short film
2022	Queer as Folk	Brodie Beaumont	Series regular, 8 episodes
2024–present	Sistas	Jordan Williams	Series regular
2024	Based on a True Story	Park dad	2 episodes
2026	Survivor 51	Contestant	TBA
