= Sandra Caldwell (actress) =

American actress

- Born: Washington, D.C., U.S.
- Occupations: Actress; singer; writer
- Years active: 1988–present
- Known for: Little Men

Sandra Caldwell is an American actress, singer, and writer. Caldwell is known for recurring roles in Canadian TV series like Little Men and The Book of Negroes and smaller roles in US films like Shall We Dance and Murder at 1600. Caldwell's pioneering experience as a trans woman in the Western entertainment industry was discussed in the 2020 documentary Disclosure: Trans Lives on Screen.

== Early life ==
Caldwell was born in Washington, D.C., and ran away to New York several times through her teenage years to see shows on Broadway and figure "things out". By 18 she already knew that performing in stage shows was what she wanted to do.

== Transition ==
In her early 20s Caldwell transitioned to presenting publicly as a woman. She was supported by her mother and a couple of friends, and received gender affirming hormone therapy. Caldwell later described the transition as giving her "a lot of joy, and also relief."

== Career ==
Caldwell fulfilled her dream of becoming a showgirl and traveled to Europe to work at the Moulin Rouge. Upon returning to North America she settled in Toronto, Canada and began working on screen appearing first as "Mother" in a 1988 episode of T. and T. Through the 1990's she appeared in numerous television movies and cinema releases including as a receptionist in 1993's Life with Mikey, Mrs. Wallace in 1997's Murder at 1600, Paulette Mercer in 1998's Blind Faith. On stage she was nominated for a Dora Mavor Moore Award in 1997 for her part in the musical Sophisticated Ladies.

In 1998 she secured her longest lasting screen role, that of Asia Franklin in both seasons of the TV series Little Men based on Louisa May Alcott's sequel to Little Women. It debuted on CTV and the family-friendly PAX TV.

Her other screen work continued including a pioneering bedroom love scene opposite cis actor and Academy Award winner Louis Gossett Jr. in 1999's Love Songs, and parts in Disney's family adventure The Cheetah Girls and Shall We Dance. Other notable roles on stage included in the original Broadway company of Buddy: The Buddy Holly Story in 1990 and a production of Anything That Moves in 2001. She was also in the TV special The Book of Negroes in 2015.

In 2026, Caldwell guest-starred in the season 5 finale of The Ms. Pat Show (alongside Loretta Devine and SWV) as Terry's biological parent, a trans woman named Yolanda.

== Coming Out ==
For many decades Caldwell would not tell people that she was trans and lived with the fear that this news could devastate her and her career: "You wake up afraid. You go to sleep afraid. You are trying to figure out if someone is going to drop the bomb. You are just afraid all the time." After writing and performing her autobiographical musical show “The Guide to Being Fabulous After You’ve Skinned Your Knee,” at Berkeley Street Theater in Toronto in 2010, Caldwell entered a period of depression concerned that she needed to disclose even more of the truth of her life. She told the New York Times: "After that show, the bottom fell out because I felt like I was lying. I had left myself out. I left the truth about me out."

In 2017, after getting the lead role in the play "Charm" based on the life of fellow black trans woman Gloria Allen, Caldwell revealed publicly for the first time that she was herself trans. The show and her coming-out performance were well received. Variety's Marilyn Stasio called Caldwell a "black transgender woman of immense poise, beauty and—pardon me, I can’t help myself—charm," and New York magazine's Sara Holdren praised her as "classy and charismatic."

She further discussed her experience living in "stealth" and now as an openly trans woman in the 2020 documentary Disclosure: Trans Lives on Screen.
