= Queer as Folk (2022 TV series) =

English drama adapted to American television

- Genre: Drama
- Based on: Queer as Folk
- Developed by: Stephen Dunn
- Starring: Fin Argus; CG; Jesse James Keitel; Ryan O'Connell; Johnny Sibilly; Devin Way
- Countries of origin: United States; United Kingdom
- Original language: English
- No. of seasons: 1
- No. of episodes: 8

Production
- Executive producers: Stephen Dunn; Jaclyn Moore; Russell T Davies; Lee Eisenberg; Emily Brecht; Nicola Shindler; Louise Pederson; Brian Dannelly
- Running time: 42–56 minutes
- Production companies: Piece of Work; Red Production Company; All3Media International; Furnace Room Films; Universal Content Productions

Original release
- Network: Peacock
- Release: June 9, 2022

Related
- Queer as Folk (1999 series); Queer as Folk (2000 series)

Queer as Folk is a drama television series developed for Peacock by Stephen Dunn. It is a re-imagining of the Channel 4 1999 British TV series Queer as Folk that was created by Russell T. Davies. The series was released on June 9, 2022. The reboot was cancelled after one season on September 23, 2022, due to low ratings.

== Premise ==
Set in New Orleans, the series follows a diverse group of friends who find their lives transformed in the aftermath of a shooting at a queer nightclub called the Babylon. The group struggles with vulnerability, addiction, grief, and relationships.

== Cast and characters ==
=== Main ===
- Fin Argus as Mingus, a non-binary teen and high school student who is an aspiring drag queen. They (Note: this character uses they/them pronouns.) were performing on stage when the shooter entered the bar. They were saved from the gunfire when Brodie tackled them. Mingus becomes smitten with Brodie.
- Candace Grace (CG) as Shar, Ruthie's partner. Shar gives birth to twins the night of the shooting. Brodie is the sperm donor, despite the fact that Shar is mostly disapproving of Brodie. Shar uses they/them pronouns and parental term "Zaddy".
- Jesse James Keitel as Ruthie O'Neil, Shar's partner and Brodie's best friend since they attended Catholic high school together. Ruthie is a trans woman, and an English teacher at the high school attended by Mingus.
- Ryan O'Connell as Julian Beaumont, Brodie's brother. Brodie had no idea Julian is gay until Julian is arrested for having sex in the bathroom at the mall.
- Johnny Sibilly as Noah Hernandez, Brodie's ex-boyfriend. Noah is a lawyer who, after the death of his lover, Daddius, in the Babylon shooting, struggles with addiction and grief. The new party Ghost Fag is held in his home. Noah kept his relationship with Daddius a secret from Brodie.
- Devin Way as Brodie Beaumont, the complicated protagonist. Brodie drops out of medical school to return home to NOLA. Brodie struggles to reconnect with his ex-partner Noah, as well as with friends and family. On the night of the shooting at Babylon, he takes a bullet in the arm saving Mingus from the shooter. On the same night, his friend Shar (with their partner Ruthie) gives birth to twins, for whom he is the sperm donor / biological dad.

=== Recurring ===
- Kim Cattrall as Brenda Beaumont, the eccentric mother to Brodie and Julian.
- Juliette Lewis as Judy, the free spirited mother of Mingus.
- Ed Begley Jr. as Winston Beaumont, the rich husband to Brenda and father of Brodie and Julian.
- Armand Fields as Bussey, a leader in the LGBTQ+ community and drag queen. Worked at the Babylon to organize performers and teaches a class on drag performance. The night of the shooting, they ignore their wounds to ensure members of the community are not taken advantage of by media. Bussy takes on their former role when Ghost Fag opens.
- Chris Renfro as Daddius Miller, who was the best friend of Brodie and secret lover of Noah. Daddius is killed at the Babylon the night of the shooting.
- Eric Graise as Marvin, who meets Brodie and Mingus the night of the shooting at Babylon. Marvin sneaks Mingus into the club by having them assist getting their wheelchair up the steps due to a lack of ramp. Brodie, who is smoking a cigarette when this occurs, joins in to help. Marvin is an advocate for nightlife to be more accessible to disabled people. Marvin uses the money from the survivors fund to pay for services from Ali, but eventually develops mutual feelings for one another.
- Sachin Bhatt as Ali, a sex worker hired by Marvin for the "boyfriend experience" but eventually develops feelings for Marvin.
- Benito Skinner as Jack Cole Jordan

=== Guest ===
- Brandon Gilpin as Jake, Mingus's best friend
- Nyle DiMarco as Leo, a sex worker hired by Brodie to have sex with Julian
- Big Freedia as self / Babylon party guest
- Lukas Gage as Eric
- Megan Stalter as Meg
- Olli Haaskivi as George
- Calvin Seabrooks as Taylor

== Episodes ==
No.	Title	Directed by	Written by	Original release date
1	"Babylon"	Stephen Dunn	Stephen Dunn	June 9, 2022
2	"Blocked"	Satya Bhabha	Jaclyn Moore & Brontez Purnell	June 9, 2022
3	"Welcum to the Hellmouth"	Satya Bhabha	Stephen Dunn & Des Moran	June 9, 2022
4	"#F*ck Disabled People"	Brian Dannelly	Ryan O'Connell & Alyssa Taylor	June 9, 2022
5	"Choke"	Brian Dannelly	Roxane Gay & Azam Mahmood	June 9, 2022
6	"Pretend You're Someone Else"	Ingrid Jungermann	Jaclyn Moore & Sarah Link	June 9, 2022
7	"Problemática"	Stephen Dunn	Stephen Dunn & Ryan O'Connell	June 9, 2022
8	"Sacrilege"	Stephen Dunn	Des Moran & Maia Golden	June 9, 2022

== Production ==
=== Development ===
In December 2018, it was announced Bravo had put into development a reboot of Queer as Folk with Stephen Dunn set to write and direct, with Russell T. Davies set to executive produce. However, in August 2019, it was announced the series was now in development at Peacock. In April 2021, Peacock ordered the series.

Dunn has indicated that this incarnation of the series was inspired directly by Davies' original series as a "jumping off point", stating that he did not take the Showtime adaptation into consideration.

Dunn assembled the writer's room while isolated at his mother's condo in St. John's, Newfoundland and Labrador due to the COVID-19 pandemic. The entire writer's staff ended up being queer, save one writer's assistant. Due to low viewership, on September 23, 2022, the series was canceled after one season.

=== Casting ===
In August 2021, Jesse James Keitel joined the cast in a series regular role. In September 2021, Candace Grace, Johnny Silbilly, Devin Way, Fin Argus, and Ryan O'Connell joined the cast in series regular roles. In November 2021, Kim Cattrall joined the cast in a recurring capacity. In December 2021, Juliette Lewis, Ed Begley Jr., Armand Fields, Chris Renfro, Eric Graise, Sachin Bhatt and Benito Skinner joined the cast in recurring capacity. In March 2022, it was announced Lukas Gage, Megan Stalter, Olli Haaskivi and Calvin Seabrooks had joined the cast in guest capacity.

=== Filming ===
Principal photography began by October 2021, in New Orleans, Louisiana.

== Release ==
The series was released on June 9, 2022, on Peacock. In Australia the series premiered on Stan on June 10, 2022. The series aired in Canada on Showcase beginning on June 26, 2022, as part of owner Corus Entertainment's output deal with NBCUniversal for Peacock original programming. The series was picked up by Starzplay for distribution in the UK, several continental European countries, and Latin America. In the UK, it premiered on July 1, 2022, and in other territories on July 31, 2022.

== Reception ==
The review aggregator website Rotten Tomatoes reported an 80% critic approval rating with an average rating of 7.6/10, based on 20 critic reviews. The website's critics consensus reads, "Sprawling to a fault but packed with lovable characters and cultural resonance, Queer as Folk successfully updates a watershed in LGBTQ representation for a new era." Many critics praised the diversity of the new era, with the Guardian writing "Queer As Folk finds ever more delicious and delirious ways of offering prickly story beats and character arcs that refuse to flatten or homogenize the LGBTQ+ community... The cast and characters are much more diverse than previous versions in terms of race, gender identity, sexuality and levels of physical ability." However the reception from the general public was less favorable with a Rotten Tomatoes approval rating of only 44%. Metacritic, which uses a weighted average, assigned a score of 53 out of 100 based on 8 critics, indicating more of a mixed reception.

While critics were generally positive, some critics and the public never warmed to the new iteration and the show was cancelled after just one season. Camilla Long from The Times writes "The Peacock show toes a fine line between representing marginalized communities and potentially exploiting their trauma... Queer as Folk always felt dangerous and interesting, as if we were peeking in on a world we shouldn’t. The reboot feels jaded, as if we are watching things we’ve seen a hundred times before." And Richard Lawson in his Vanity Fair review writes "The new Queer as Folk gets bogged down in Tragedy... But is that what Queer as Folk should be? After watching all of the first season, I think my answer is no." Some reviewers noted that it was hard to relate to the characters, with the Boston Globe writing "There’s plenty of emoting going on, and the issues at stake are clear enough, but there’s not enough character depth and warmth in the air. The characters seem self-absorbed, and, alas, their romantic histrionics and struggles didn’t move me."
