= Johnny Sibilly =

American actor and producer

- Born: September 5, 1987 (age 39); Metairie, Louisiana, U.S
- Occupations: Actor, producer
- Years active: 2013–present

Johnny Sibilly (born September 5, 1987) is an American actor and producer. His work includes roles in Pose, The Deuce, Hacks and the Queer as Folk reboot on Peacock.

== Early life ==
Sibilly grew up in a military family and lived in Germany, Texas, and Miami. From a young age, he knew he wanted to be an actor.

== Career ==
In 2018, Sibilly began a recurring role in the FX drama Pose. He auditioned for the show three times before being cast.

In December 2020, Sibilly began hosting a twice-weekly series for Logo TV called Logo Live, a rundown of the day's top stories, featuring celebrity guests. In February 2021, he was announced as a recurring guest star on the HBO show Hacks. In September 2021, Sibilly was announced as one of five cast members of a new Queer as Folk reboot on Peacock, in which he played "a successful lawyer who is not as put together as he seems."

== Personal life ==
Sibilly is a queer man, activist, and supporter of Latin-American and LGBTQ+ rights. He is of Cuban and Dominican descent.

== Filmography ==
=== Film ===
Year	Title	Role	Notes
2015	When I'm with You	Dancing Guy	
2015	The Closer	Bobby	
2019	Vanilla	Fernando	

=== Television ===
Key
†	Denotes television productions that have not yet been released

Year	Title	Role	Notes
2013	Deadly Affairs	Spa Attendant	Episode: "Women on Top"
2013	Celebrity Ghost Stories	Young Nick Turturro	Episode: "Andy Dick/Justin Henry/Nick Turturro/Betsey Johnson"
2014	Law & Order: Special Victims Unit	Drag Queen	Episode: "Chicago Crossover"
2014	My Crazy Love	Dave	Episode: "Wali and Katie"
2014	Deadly Sins	Detective Graham	Episode: "Rotten to the Core"
2015	Eye Candy	Undercover Detective	Episode: "IRL"
2015	Power	Clerk	Episode: "Like We're Any Other Couple"
2015	Over My Dead Body	Johnny Acevedo / EMT	2 episodes
2017	The Deuce	Aaron	Episode: "The Principle Is All"
2018–2019	Pose	Costas	3 episodes
2019	Matt and Dan	Julissa	Episode: "Cookie Girl"
2019	Liza on Demand	Shane	Episode: "New Year's Eve: Part 2"
2022	Queer as Folk	Noah Hernandez	Main role
2021–2026	Hacks	Wilson	Recurring role, 11 episodes
2024	Station 19	Dominic Amaya	Recurring role
2027	The Traitors †	Contestant	Season 6
