= MK Ultra (film) =

2022 film by Joseph Sorrentino

- Official release poster
- Directed by: Joseph Sorrentino
- Written by: Joseph Sorrentino
- Produced by: Lee Broda; Brian Mercer; Andreas Schilling; Joseph Sorrentino; Jerry Tankersley; Seth Willenson
- Starring: Anson Mount; Jaime Ray Newman; Jason Patric; Alon Aboutboul; Jen Richards
- Cinematography: Diego Romero
- Edited by: Cristóbal Fernández
- Music by: Tony Neiman
- Production companies: LB Entertainment; Ten Past Nine Productions
- Distributed by: Cinedigm; Bleiberg Entertainment
- Release date: October 7, 2022
- Running time: 98 minutes
- Country: United States
- Language: English

MK Ultra is a 2022 American psychological thriller film written and directed by ex-intelligence officer Joseph Sorrentino. Based on a true story about the human experimentation program MKUltra conducted by Central Intelligence Agency (CIA) in the 1960s, the film follows Dr. Ford Strauss (Anson Mount), a psychiatrist who gets involved in a government experiment and conspiracy involving the use of psychedelic and other mind-controlling substances. It was released theatrically and on video on demand on October 7, 2022.

== Premise ==
In the early 1960s, during the CIA's secret and illegal human experimentation program MK-Ultra, (Note: "MK" was an arbitrary symbol for the CIA's Technical Services Division. See CIA cryptonym#Format of cryptonyms and CIA cryptonym#Digraphs.) Dr. Ford Strauss (Anson Mount), a psychiatrist, is attempting to get medical LSD testings approved; his moral and scientific boundaries are pushed to the limit, as he is approached by CIA agent Galvin Morgan (Jason Patric) to run a subsect of the program in a rural Mississippi psychiatric hospital. As he conducts the experiments on a drug addict, an arsonist, a transgender woman, and an animal killer, Dr. Strauss begins to question Agent Morgan’s ethics and disentangles an incomprehensible conspiracy.

== Cast ==
- Anson Mount as Ford Strauss
- Jaime Ray Newman as Rose Strauss
- Jason Patric as Galvin Morgan
- Alon Aboutboul as Townsend
- Jen Richards as Laura Stanley
- David Jensen as Dr. Miller
- Wanetah Walmsley as Nurse Irwin
- Jared Bankens as Gunther
- Harrison Stone as Brian Mercer
- Matt Nolan as Dwyer
- Charles Green as Kevin Mercer
- Susan McPhail as Peggy
- Cotton Yancey as Senator Mathis
- Bill Luckett as Senator Mathis
- Robert Aberdeen as The German
- Jill Renner as Shelly Powers
- Josh Whites as Dallas Shepard
- Ted Ford as Confused guard
- Dalton Russell as Mental Patient
- Tony Key as Desmond Wallace
- Greg Dees as FBI Agent
- Cameron Abel as Father Jerry Schilling

== Production ==
Formerly titled Midnight Climax, MK Ultra is the third feature film directed by Joseph Sorrentino, who previously comes from an Intelligence Operations background. He wrote the film based on a true story about the illegal human experimentation program Project MK-Ultra, conducted by Central Intelligence Agency in the 1960s. The film is produced by LB Entertainment and Ten Past Nine Productions with Suzy Bergner, Tom Rooker and Sigurjon Sighvatsson as executive producers.

== Release ==
The official trailer has been released on August 31, 2022. The film was released theatrically, and on video on demand on October 7, 2022 in the United States through Cinedigm, and worldwide through Bleiberg Entertainment.

== See also ==
- Project MK-Ultra
  - Operation Midnight Climax
- Unethical human experimentation
  - in the United States
