= Asher Jelinsky =

American film director

- Born: United States
- Education: AFI
- Occupations: Writer, director
- Years active: 2017–present
- Known for: Student Academy Awards winner Miller & Son Live Action Short Film
- Website: https://www.asherjelinsky.com

Asher Jelinsky is an American film director and writer, best known for their short film Miller & Son (2019), for which they received critical acclaim and won the BAFTA Student Film Award and the Gold Medal for "Best Narrative" (Domestic) at the 2019 Student Academy Awards.

== Biography ==
Jelinsky was born and grew up in the San Francisco Bay Area and earned a bachelor's degree in Media Studies and Public Health from Pitzer College. They also attended the American Film Institute where they received an MFA in Directing.

In 2019, Jelinsky directed their AFI thesis film Miller & Son which explores the feeling of compartmentalization by portraying the life of a transgender mechanic, performed by then-non-binary actress Jesse James Keitel. The film won the BAFTA Student Film Award and the Gold Medal for "Best Narrative" (Domestic) at the 2019 Student Academy Awards.

Jelinsky is non-binary and uses singular they pronouns. They are currently based in Los Angeles.
