= Lininger =

Lininger is a surname. It is an Americanized iteration of the German surname Leininger. Notable people with the surname include:

- Ann Lininger (born 1968), American politician
- George W. Lininger (1834–1907), American art collector
- Jack Lininger (1927–2002), American football player
