= Outsiders (film) =

- Directed by: Delmar Washington
- Written by: Tucker Morgan
- Starring: Skylan Brooks; Shane West; Bill Engvall; Taryn Manning
- Distributed by: Vertical Entertainment
- Release date: March 11, 2022
- Running time: 85 minutes
- Countries: United States; Australia
- Language: English

Outsiders (formerly titled No Running) is a 2022 mystery science fiction thriller film written by Tucker Morgan, directed by Delmar Washington and starring Skylan Brooks, Shane West, Bill Engvall and Taryn Manning.

== Cast ==
- Skylan Brooks as Jaylen Brown
- Rutina Wesley as Ramila
- Shane West as Sheriff O'Hare
- Diamond White as Simone
- Hart Denton as Trevor
- Clark Backo as Amira
- Bill Engvall as Tim
- Taryn Manning

== Release ==
In January 2022, it was announced that the North American distribution rights to the film were acquired by Vertical Entertainment. The film was released on March 11, 2022.

== Reception ==
The film has a 36% rating on Rotten Tomatoes based on 11 reviews. Bobby LePire of Film Threat rated the film a 7.5 out of 10.
