= Gossamer Folds =

2020 film by Lisa Donato

- Directed by: Lisa Donato
- Written by: Bridget Flanery
- Produced by: Adam Carl; Ben Cornwell; Jordan Foley; Jonathan Rosenthal; Nick Smith; Yeardley Smith
- Starring: Jackson Robert Scott; Alexandra Grey; Shane West; Sprague Grayden; Ethan Suplee
- Cinematography: Ava Benjamin Shorr
- Edited by: Alex Blatt
- Music by: Aaron Zigman
- Production companies: Paperclip Limited; Mill House Motion Pictures
- Distributed by: Indican Pictures
- Release dates: August 15, 2020 (BFF); August 12, 2022 (United States)
- Running time: 96 minutes
- Country: United States
- Language: English
- Box office: $7,113

Gossamer Folds is a 2020 American drama film directed by Lisa Donato, written by Bridget Flanery, and starring Jackson Robert Scott and Alexandra Grey. Yeardley Smith serves as one of the producers of the film. It is Donato's feature directorial debut.

== Cast ==
- Jackson Robert Scott as Tate
- Alexandra Grey as Gossamer
- Sprague Grayden as Frannie
- Shane West as Billy
- Ethan Suplee as Jimbo
- Franklin Ojeda Smith as Edward
- Yeardley Smith as Phyllis
- Jen Richards as Diana
- Brenda Currin as Maybelle
- Laurie Foxx as Karen - Mother of the Bride
- Camilla Marchena as Carmen

== Production ==
Principal photography began on November 15, 2018. In January 2019, it was announced that Shane West completed his scenes in the film. Yeardley Smith confirmed in a March 2019 interview with Forbes that the film "is currently being edited."

== Release ==
The film made its worldwide premiere at the 2020 Bentonville Film Festival. The film also premiered at the 2020 KASHISH Mumbai International Queer Film Festival. It was also featured at the Outfest LA Film Festival in August 2020. It was released in select theaters in the United States on August 12, 2022, by Indican Pictures, and on video on-demand on August 23.

=== Accolades ===
Year	Award	Category	Recipient(s)	Result	Ref.
2022	GLAAD Media Awards	GLAAD Media Award for Outstanding Film – Limited Release	Gossamer Folds	Nominated	
