= Walden (2023 film) =

- Directed by: Mick Davis
- Screenplay by: Mick Davis
- Produced by: Seth Michaels; Sara Sometti Michaels
- Starring: Emile Hirsch; Shane West
- Production companies: Benacus Entertainment; RNF Productions
- Distributed by: Uncork’d Entertainment
- Release date: November 10, 2023 (limited)
- Running time: 1 hour and 41 mins
- Country: United States
- Language: English

Walden (formerly titled The Stenographer) is a 2023 American thriller film written and directed by Mick Davis and starring Emile Hirsch and Shane West.

== Plot ==
Walden Dean is a polite, nerdy stenographer in the courtroom of Judge Boyle. He is single, lives alone and is estranged from his father, Jesse, and had a complicated relationship with his late mother, who abandoned him when he was young. One day, he attends the trial of Norman Bolt, who raped his own daughter, then murdered her by burning her to death in an oven. Walden becomes increasingly sickened after the case, and later faints at work; tests reveal that he has a brain tumor that may be terminal. He declines surgery and struggles with whether to take medication, which may simply prolong the inevitable.

Walden meets with his father, who dismisses Walden's commitment to and familial legacy for stenography, and tells him to find a better purpose in his life. He stops at a convenience store later that night, and impulsively stops a robber by smashing a whiskey bottle over his head. Walden, shocked by his own uncharacteristic capacity for violence, is met by detective Bill Kane and agrees to stop by the police station to give a statement.

Meanwhile, Bill and his partner, Sally Hunt, are investigating a string of mysterious disappearances involving local boys, the latest of which appears to be Cal Pepper. When Walden arrives at the station to give his statement, he is informed that Norman Bolt was released on a technicality and is unrepentant about his crime. With nothing left to lose, Walden ambushes Norman at his house and kills him by burning him to death in his new oven. He also murders Nurse Mills, a nursing home worker who had been torturing and killing her elderly and infirm clients for years, but had not been prosecuted due to her hiding the evidence. Bill and Sally are puzzled by these crimes, but have no leads.

Cal Pepper's body is discovered in the woods; Walden stumbles upon the crime scene as it is being investigated, and glimpses some evidence, a piece of unusual fabric. Sally suspects George, a local mentally handicapped man who is known for being friends with children. Bill arrests George, but no evidence of his involvement is discovered, and they have no further leads. After Walden, who is friends with George and outraged by his arrest, convinces Bill that he is innocent, Bill allows George to lead him and Sally to a house in the middle of the woods, where they find the fossilized bodies of the missing boys. It is revealed that some of the victims, who were friends with George, told him that they had been taken to the house to be paid to perform sexual services.

Walden confronts two men who are about to sexually assault a pair of women, and who had attacked Sally and her girlfriend earlier. One stabs him, and he shoots both to death. He is taken to the hospital, treated, and finally has his tumor removed; he and his father also reconcile. While convalescing at home, Judge Boyle visits him. As he leaves, Walden admires his antique car, but notices fabric missing from the back seat that matches the evidence found on Cal Pepper's body. Combined with George's mysterious, frequent assertion that there is a "bad man" in court regardless of the defendant's gender, Walden realizes Boyle is the killer.

Walden confronts Boyle at home. Boyle freely admits to the crimes, musing that he has killed countless children since he was seventeen, and even had interest in Walden at one point. Walden forces Boyle to die by suicide. Bill and Sally later visit Walden at his home, having finally linked Walden to the murders, but they do not arrest him, as he had only killed fellow criminals. After fully recovering from his injuries, Walden reviews past cases of other criminals who got away with their crimes, planning his next killing.

== Cast ==
- Emile Hirsch as Walden Dean
- Shane West as Detective Bill Kane
- Kelli Garner as Emily Duperon
- Tania Raymonde as Detective Sally Hunt
- David Keith as Judge Boyle
- Steve Coulter as Jesse Dean
- Luke Davis as General George
- Gavin Borders as Young Walden
- Kathrine Barnes as Claire Dean
- Sunny Mabrey as Laurie Kane
- Ben Bladon as Norman Bolt
- Deadra Moore as Nurse Mills

== Production ==
The film was shot in Atlanta in July 2022.

== Release ==
The film was released in limited theaters on November 10, 2023.

== Reception ==
Jon Mendelsohn of Comic Book Resources gave the film a negative review, calling it “a mishmash of tones that doesn't work as a thriller, but the film's unexpected quirks keep it watchable.”
