= Elisabeth Leisinger =

German opera singer

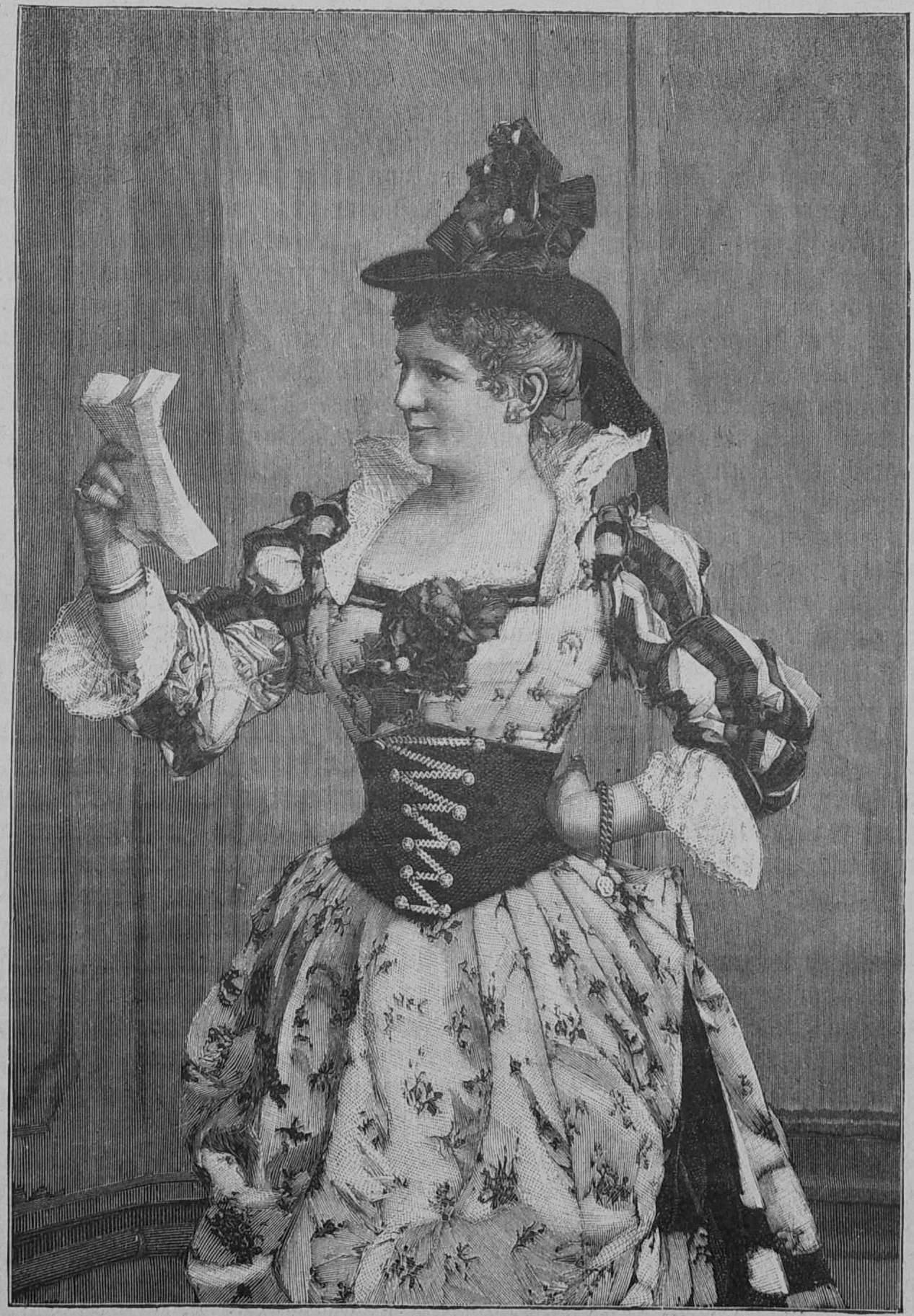
- Born: 17 May 1864; Stuttgart, Kingdom of Württemberg
- Died: 12 October 1913 (aged 49); Eblingen, France
- Occupation: Opera singer (soprano)
- Spouse: Dr. Müllberger
- Parents: Dr. Julius Leisinger (father); Bertha Leisinger (mother)

Elisabeth Leisinger (1864-1913) was a German dramatic soprano. Her mother initially opposed her wish for a singing career, but after her father's death she relented. She studied at the Stuttgart Conservatory and later with Pauline Viardot in Paris. She became a member of the Berlin Court Opera in 1884 and until 1894 after performing shows in Stuttgart. Her debut was as Rosina in The Barber of Seville. She unsuccessfully performed at the Paris Opera in 1886, and by performing broke her contract with the Berlin Court Opera. After later marrying Dr. Müllberger in Esslingen, she retired from the stage.
