= Jen Richards =

American writer, actress, producer, and activist

- Occupations: Writer; actress; producer; activist
- Website: https://smartassjen.com/

Jen Richards is an American writer, actress, producer, and activist.

== Life and career ==
Richards was born in Mississippi and resides in North Carolina. She graduated from Shimer College with a BA in Philosophy, and studied at Oxford University.

In 2015, she appeared as a supporting cast member of Caitlyn Jenner's reality show I Am Cait. In 2016, she co-starred, co-directed, co-wrote and co-produced the web series Her Story, which was nominated for an Emmy Award. Richards also co-produced the series More Than T and wrote the Trans 102 series.

Richards joined the cast of the television series Nashville in 2017. She became the first openly transgender person to appear on a CMT show, playing the first transgender character to appear on that network. Richards also appeared in the 2017 film Easy Living.

In June 2017, Richards wrote and appeared in a video open letter, presented by ScreenCrush and GLAAD, featuring trans actors asking for better representation in film and television.

In August 2018, HBO announced a series pickup of Tom Perrotta's Mrs. Fletcher, a half-hour comedy based on Perrotta's 2017 novel of the same name; Richards is cast as Margo Fairchild, a transgender community college writing teacher, as a series regular.

== Personal life ==
Richards is bisexual and transgender. In August 2020, she announced her engagement to Rebekah Cheyne, a professor from Arizona State University.

== Filmography ==
=== Television ===
Year	Title	Role	Notes
2015	I Am Cait	Self	7 episodes
2016	Her Story	Violet	Main role, also writer and producer. Nominated for an Emmy Award for Outstanding Short Form Comedy or Drama Series
2016–2017	Nashville	Allyson Del Lago	3 episodes
2017	Doubt	McKayla	Episode: "Clean Burn"
2017–2022	Better Things	Jaia	5 episodes
2018	Take My Wife	Naomi	Episode 2.1
2018–2020	Blindspot	Sabrina Larren	3 episodes
2019	Tales of the City	Anna Madrigal	2 episodes
2019	Mrs. Fletcher	Margo Fairchild	7 episodes
2021	Clarice	Julia Lawson	3 episodes
2023-2025	Mayfair Witches	Josephine "Jojo" Mayfair	6 episodes

=== Film ===
Year	Title	Role	Notes
2017	Easy Living	Danny	
2020	Disclosure: Trans Lives on Screen	Self	Documentary film
2020	Gossamer Folds	Diana	
2022	Framing Agnes	Barbara	Documentary film
2022	MK Ultra	Laura Stanley	
