= This Is Me: Pride Celebration Spectacular =

This Is Me: Pride Celebration Spectacular is a Disney+ special that aired on June 27, 2021.
