= Leininger =

Leininger is a surname. Notable people with the surname include:

- Claus Leininger (1931–2005), German theatre director and manager
- Dannette Leininger (born 1963), American handball player
- James Leininger (born 1998), American child reincarnation case
- James R. Leininger (born 1944), American businessman
- Madeleine Leininger (1925–2012), American nurse

== See also ==
- Leininger Peak, mountain of Antarctica
