= Shane West =

American actor, singer and songwriter

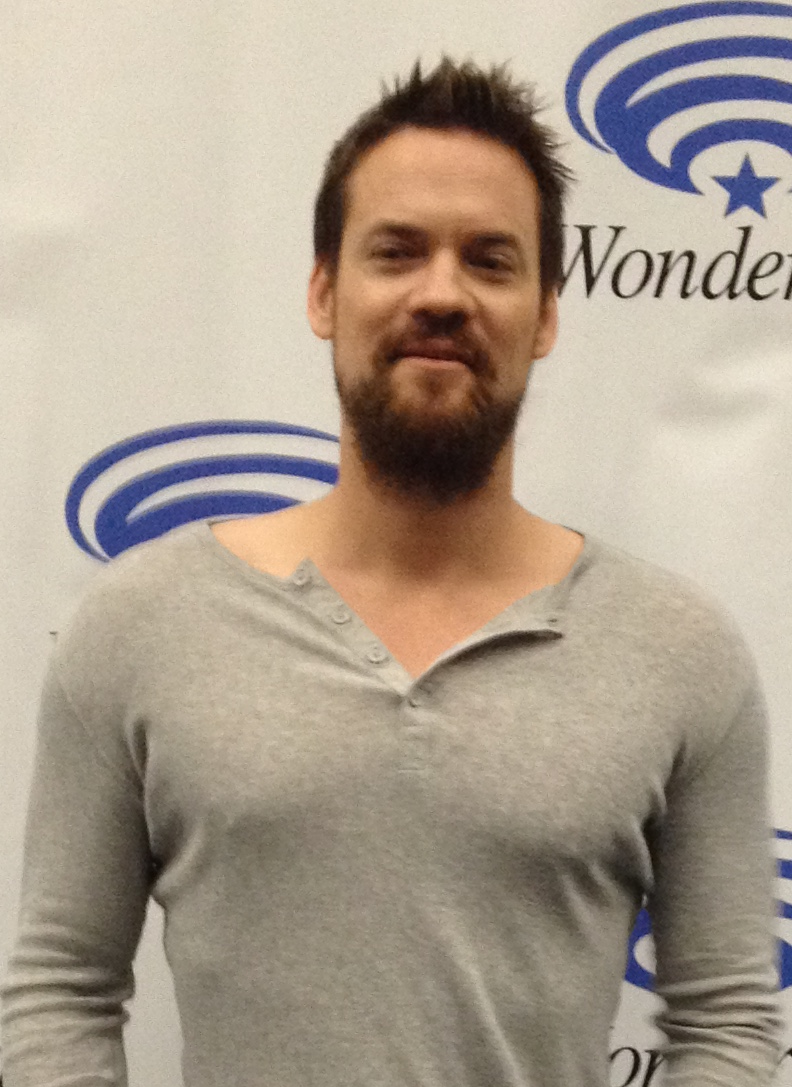
- West in 2015
- Born: Shannon Bruce Snaith; June 10, 1978 (age 48); Baton Rouge, Louisiana, U.S.
- Occupations: Actor; singer; songwriter
- Years active: 1995–present
- Musical career
- Genre: Punk rock
- Instrument: Vocals
- Formerly of: Germs, Jonny Was, Twilight Creeps

Shannon Bruce Snaith (born June 10, 1978), better known as Shane West, is an American actor, singer and songwriter. He is known for his portrayal of Eli Sammler in the ABC family drama Once and Again, Landon Carter in A Walk to Remember, Dr. Ray Barnett in the NBC medical drama ER, Michael Bishop in The CW spy drama Nikita and in the WGN fantasy adventure historical drama Salem as John Alden. West received critical acclaim for his performance portraying Darby Crash in the biopic What We Do Is Secret.

As well as acting, West has performed with punk rock bands the Germs, Jonny Was, and the Twilight Creeps.

== Early life ==
West was born in Baton Rouge, Louisiana, the son of Leah Catherine (née Launey), a lawyer, and Don Snaith, a drugstore owner. Both his parents were musicians and had their own punk rock bands. His mother is of Cajun French descent. His father was born in Jamaica, of English and Portuguese-Jewish origin. He is the eldest of three children, with a sister Simone and a half-sister Marli Ann. His parents divorced in 1982 when he was four years old. Influenced by his parents, he grew up listening to the Clash, the Jam, Blondie, Elvis Costello, and the Kinks. He said, "I always thought I would be doing music rather than acting."

At age ten, West, his mother and his sister Simone relocated to Compton, California, as his mother was pursuing job opportunities. They later moved to Norwalk, California. Embarrassed by his feminine first name, West went by his middle name Bruce but changed his name to Shane West in high school when he took up acting.

== Career ==
=== Acting ===
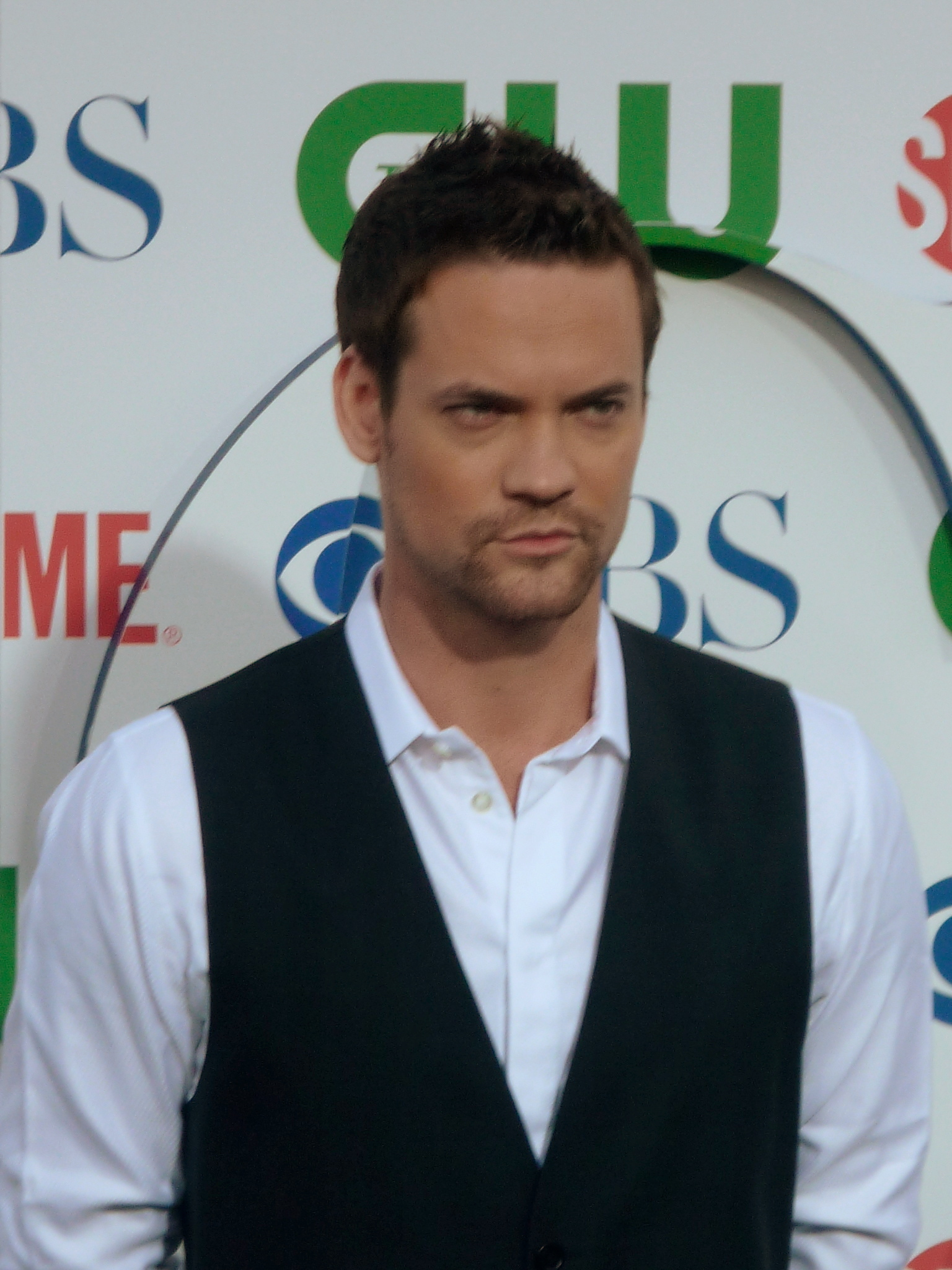
West at the 2010 CBS Summer Press Tour Party

West struggled to land acting work for two years and resided at his manager's house before making his acting debut in 1995, playing Dave Lattimore in the CBS drama Picket Fences (season 4, episode 6, "Heart of Saturday Night")

In 1998, West guest-starred in several television series, including Buffy the Vampire Slayer, and played Mark Tapper in the stage production of The Cider House Rules. He landed his first major role in 1999 in the ABC family drama Once and Again, playing Eli Sammler for three seasons. West's feature film debut was in Liberty Heights, a film about a Jewish family in Baltimore, directed by Barry Levinson. He also co-starred in teen comedies Whatever It Takes (2000) and Get Over It (2001).

West was cast as Landon Carter opposite singer and actress Mandy Moore in 2002's adaptation of Nicholas Sparks' novel A Walk to Remember. Roger Ebert of the Chicago Sun-Times found him "quietly convincing". His performance in the film earned him a Teen Choice Award for Choice Chemistry with Moore. He also appeared in the Mandy Moore music video "Cry". That year, West won the Young Hollywood Award Male Superstar of Tomorrow.

In 2003, West starred as an adult version of Mark Twain's Tom Sawyer in The League of Extraordinary Gentlemen alongside Sean Connery. A year later, he joined the cast of the NBC medical drama, ER in the eleventh-season premiere, playing resident Ray Barnett. In May 2007, West left ER at the end of the thirteenth season after winning a role in Supreme Courtships, but the series was not picked up by the Fox Network. In October 2008, West returned to ER for three episodes during its fifteenth and final season.

During hiatus between seasons of ER, West worked on shooting What We Do Is Secret, an independent film, which premiered at the 2007 Los Angeles Film Festival after much delay. West helped to finance it. In the film, he portrays Darby Crash, a member of the 1970s punk band the Germs. Members of the band were so impressed by West's performance that they re-formed the band with West taking the deceased Crash's place. West received positive reviews for his portrayal in the movie; the San Francisco Chronicle stated that he is the one who "lifts the entire film to a whole other level". Similarly, The Seattle Times wrote that his impersonation was "worth saluting" while TV Guide called it "pretty impressive". In 2008, he received the Rising Star Award in Philadelphia Film Festival for his work in What We Do is Secret.

West starred as Michael Bishop in The CW spy drama Nikita from 2010 to 2013. In 2014, he began starring in the WGN America adventure/historical/fantasy drama Salem as John Alden for three seasons before the show ended in 2017.

West starred in post-apocalyptic film, Here Alone which premiered at the 2016 Tribeca Film Festival and was released theatrically on March 30, 2017. The film received the Audience Award at the 2016 Tribeca Film Festival

In 2018, West was cast as Eduardo Dorrance in the fifth and final season of Gotham. In November 2018, it was revealed that West would portray the role of Billy Millikin in the then upcoming feature film Gossamer Folds. In November 2019, it was announced that West would star in the then upcoming sci-fi thriller No Running; the film was retitled Outsiders and released in 2022.

=== Music ===
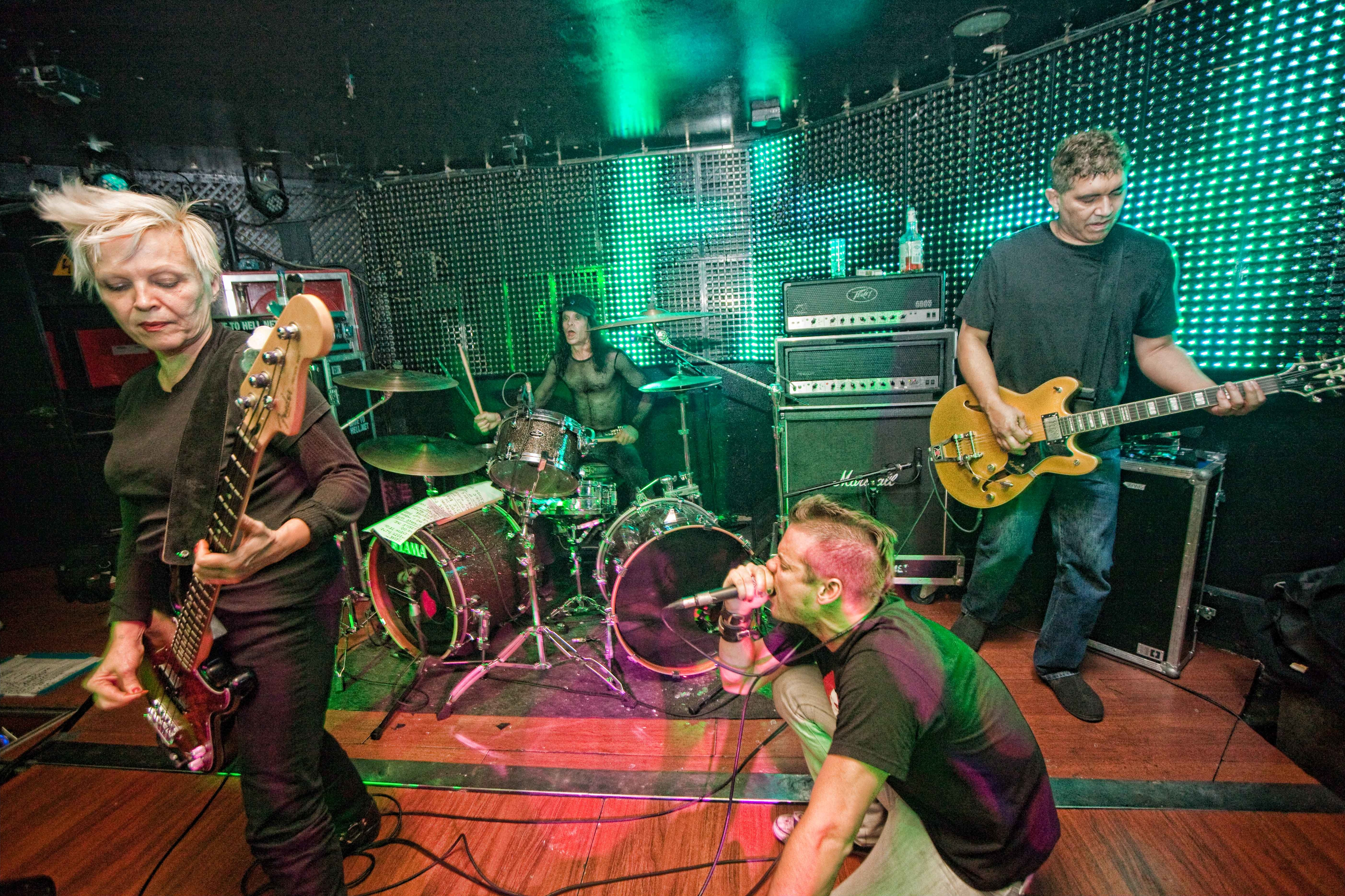
West (kneeling) performing with the Germs in 2009

West was the lead singer of punk rock band Jonny Was for "seven or eight years". The band was originally known as Average Joe but had to change its name for legal reasons. The band contributed to the A Walk to Remember soundtrack, appearing under the names "West, Gould, and Fitzgerald" because they had not yet decided on a new name. West described their style as "a pop-punk-type band, more Green Day-ish".

In November 2005, while What We Do Is Secret was still in production, it was announced that West would be fronting the Germs on tour. He performed with the band for nearly five years, doing an American tour (including the 2006 Warped Tour) and a European Tour. He described the experience as "more exciting" than acting. However, after booking a leading role in Nikita, West had less time to play with the band. His last performance was in December 2009.

In 2015, West reunited with some of his old bandmates from Jonny Was to form a new band called the Twilight Creeps. In October 2016, they released their debut album. In January 2019, they announced they are releasing their second album on February 1. In December 2020, the Twilight Creeps released their first Christmas song entitled "Poison in the Mistletoe".

== Personal life ==
West is a supporter of the New Orleans Saints and LSU Tigers football teams. In 2019, contributed voice work for some of the Saints' preseason videos.

== Filmography ==
=== Film ===
Year	Title	Role	Notes
1997	The Westing Game	Chris Theodorakis	
1999	Liberty Heights	Ted	
2000	A Time for Dancing	Paul, The DJ	
2000	Whatever It Takes	Ryan Woodman	
2000	Dracula 2000	J.T.	
2001	Get Over It!	Bentley 'Striker' Scrumfeld	
2001	Ocean's Eleven	Himself	
2002	A Walk to Remember	Landon Carter	
2003	The League of Extraordinary Gentlemen	Tom Sawyer	
2006	The Elder Son	Bo	
2007	What We Do Is Secret	Darby Crash	
2009	The Lodger	'Street' Wilkenson	
2009	Red Sands	Specialist Jeff Keller	Also co-producer
2009	Echelon Conspiracy	Max Peterson	
2010	The Presence	Ghost	
2014	Red Sky	Tom Craig	
2016	Here Alone	Jason	
2017	Awakening the Zodiac	Mick Branson	
2020	Gossamer Folds	Billy Millikin	
2022	Escape the Field	Ryan	
2022	Outsiders	Sheriff O'Hare	
2022	Chariot	Rory Calhoun	
2022	Mid-Century	Tom	Also executive producer
2023	La Usurpadora: The Musical	Chad	
2023	The Dirty South		Post-production
2023	Walden		Post-production
2025	Deadly Vows	Max	

=== Television ===
Year	Title	Role	Notes
1995	Picket Fences	Dave Lattimore	Episode: "Heart of Saturday Night"
1995	California Dreams	Doug	Episode: "Community Service"
1996	The Crew	Store Manager	Episode: "Retail Slut"
1996	Boy Meets World	Nick	Episode: "A Kiss Is More Than a Kiss"
1997	Get a Clue	Chris Theodorakis	Television
1997	Mr. Rhodes	Mick	Episode: "The Valentine Show"
1997	Meego	Guy With Big Hat	Episode: "Morality Bites"
1997	Buffy the Vampire Slayer	Sean	Episode: "Go fish"
1997	Sliders	Kirk	Episode: "California Reich"
1997	To Have & to Hold	Mitch Maloney	Episode: "Tangled Up in You" 1998
1999–2002	Once and Again	Eli Sammler	Main Role; 55 episodes
2004–2009	ER	Dr. Ray Barnett	Main Role (seasons 11–13), recurring (seasons 15); 70 episodes
2007	Supreme Courtships	Unknown	Unsold TV pilot
2010	El Dorado	Jack Wilder	2 episodes
2010–2013	Nikita	Michael	Main Role
2014–2017	Salem	John Alden	Main Role
2019	Gotham	Eduardo Dorrance / Bane	4 episodes

=== Music videos ===
Year	Artist	Title	Role
2001	Mandy Moore	"Cry"	Landon Carter
2001	Mandy Moore	"Only Hope"	Landon Carter
2001	Mandy Moore	"Someday We'll Know"	Landon Carter

== Discography ==
=== Studio albums ===
==== with Jonny Was ====
- Just Shy of the Ride (2011)

==== with Twilight Creeps ====
- Twilight Creeps (2016)
- Along Came a Spider (2019)
- Ghouls, Ghouls, Ghouls (2021)

== Awards ==
Year	Association	Category	Nominated work	Result
2002	Teen Choice Awards	Choice Chemistry: Film	A Walk to Remember	Won
2002	Teen Choice Awards	Choice TV Actor: Drama	Once and Again	Nominated
2002	Young Hollywood Awards	Male Superstar of Tomorrow	Himself	Won
2003	Cinescape Genre Face of the Future Awards	Best Male Performance	The League of Extraordinary Gentlemen	Nominated
2008	Philadelphia Film Festival	Rising Star Award	What We Do Is Secret	Won
2011	Teen Choice Awards	Choice TV Actor: Action	Nikita	Won
2012	Teen Choice Awards	Choice TV Actor: Action	Nikita	Nominated
2013	Teen Choice Awards	Choice TV Actor: Action	Nikita	Nominated
