= James Leininger reincarnation case =

The James Leininger reincarnation case was centered around an American boy, James Leininger (April 10, 1998 – ), who was argued to be the reincarnation of American fighter pilot James Huston Jr. Allegedly, beginning at age 2 in 2000, Leininger's behavior and claims resembled Huston's life, leading his parents, Bruce and Andrea Leininger, and others to believe he was Huston's reincarnation. Andrea Leininger said her mother was the first to suggest James Leininger was remembering a past life.

Jim Tucker, a researcher in the Division of Perceptual Studies at the University of Virginia, researched Leininger's case and believed it was evidence of reincarnation. Many other researchers disagree and find that "quite ordinary experiences, unsurprising coincidences, and common psychological tendencies adequately account for the basic facts of the story."

== In popular culture ==
In 2009, Bruce and Andrea published Soul Survivor: The Reincarnation of a World War II Fighter Pilot, about their experiences and why they believed their son was Huston's reincarnation.
