= BAFTA Student Film Awards =

BAFTA Student Awards
- Location: Los Angeles, California
- Formerly called: BAFTA LA Student Film Awards (2004–2013); BAFTA US Student Film Awards (2014–2016); BAFTA Student Film Awards (2017–2020)
- First award: 2004; 22 years ago
- Website: Official website

The BAFTA Student Awards are an annual awards ceremony hosted by BAFTA as a showcase for rising industry talent.

== History ==
The first award was created in 2004 with entrants limited to students of some of Southern California’s film schools. In 2013, there were submissions from 22 such film schools. It was opened to film schools outside of Los Angeles for the first time in 2014. BAFTA currently invites submissions from over 800 schools worldwide. In 2023, BAFTA received submissions from 103 schools spanning 30 different countries.

Only one award was presented at the ceremony until the addition of the Special Jury Prize in 2013. In 2017 the Student Film Award was split into three separate awards for three different categories of film: Animation, Live Action, and Documentary. In 2021, the competition was expanded with the addition of two new awards to recognise games and immersive experiences.

The animation award was sponsored in 2017 and 2018 by animation studio Laika.

== Award Categories ==
=== Film ===
- BAFTA Student Film Award for Animation (since 2017)
- BAFTA Student Film Award for Live Action (since 2017)
- BAFTA Student Film Award for Documentary (since 2017)
- Special Jury Prize (since 2013)

=== Project ===
- BAFTA Student Award for Games (since 2021)
- BAFTA Student Award for Immersive (since 2021)

=== Retired awards ===
- Best Short Film (2004)
- BAFTA Los Angeles Student Film Award (2005–2016)
