= Angel Bismark Curiel =

Dominican actor

- Born: October 16, 1995 (age 30); Miami, Florida, U.S.
- Occupation: Actor
- Years active: 2016–present

Angel Bismark Curiel (born October 16, 1995) is an American actor from Liberty City, Miami. He has appeared in America Adrift (2016), Louie's Brother Peter (2017), Night Comes On (2018), Monsters and Men (2018) and Ashes (2018). He came to national attention in 2018 for his portrayal as Lil Papi Evangelista on FX's popular television drama series Pose. In fall of 2019 his latest film, Critical Thinking, was released.

== Early life ==
Curiel grew up in Liberty City, what he describes as a rough part of Miami. He attended Miami Arts Charter School, a performing and fine arts charter school, where he got in trouble for disrupting classes as a class-clown, and for truancy. When the school's drama department supervisor gave him the choice to be disciplined by the school or a group read-through of Tennessee Williams's play The Rose Tattoo, he opted to help the reading. He did so as Alvaro Mangiacavallo, the leading man, and found a "passion for performance" which effectively launched his career. He joined the cast as well as the drama department. To stay in the department and compete in drama meets he had to improve his grades which led him to being a thespian. He also learned to confront his own fears of being vulnerable:

"My peers in the drama department gave me the space to be vulnerable, and that vulnerability pushed me to question the disease that is toxic masculinity that so many young men like myself suffer from."

Curiel drew inspiration from a screening of Spike Lee's film Freak starring John Leguizamo. Two other school productions he took part in were William Shakespeare's A Midsummer Night's Dream, and Stephen Adly Guirgis's Jesus Hopped the 'A' Train."

When he was about to graduate that same drama teacher advised him that he had a better future as an actor than a soldier, his intended career. He was accepted to Pace University to study drama, and after graduating high school moved to New York City.

== Career ==
Curiel was still in college when he started doing films. In 2016 he was in Christopher James Lopez's America Adrift, a heroin-addiction melodrama about a Long Island family led by matriarch schoolteacher Cecelia Fernandez (Lauren Vélez). Curiel plays the youngest son, Cameron, who spirals into addiction and drug-dealing. The film was featured at the 2016 International Puerto Rican Heritage Film Festival.

Curiel's next film was an indie short, Louie's Brother Peter, directed by Steven Carmona. The story centers on drug dealer Louie's brother Peter, who has Asperger syndrome but makes the drug deliveries in gentrified South Brooklyn. In January 2018, his next film, Jordana Spiro's directorial debut Night Comes On, had him portraying a store clerk. The work is a revenge piece with Angel Lamere (Dominique Fishback) avenging her mother's murder. It debuted at the 2018 Sundance Film Festival.

In September 2018, Curiel's next film, Monsters and Men, debuted; it had premiered in January at the Sundance Film Festival. Written and directed by Reinaldo Marcus Green, the drama centers on three Black men who struggle to reconcile their lives "as they marinate in guilt and complicity-by-inaction". Set in Bedford–Stuyvesant, Brooklyn, the film starts with one of "frequent murders of black men by unpunished white police officers", and follows the three men while exploring issues of violence and systemic racism towards black people, racial profiling, and police brutality.

Curiel was in college at Pace University and after three years he left to be a cast member on FX's drama series Pose. The show is about the African-American and Latino trans, gay and gender nonconforming ballroom culture scene in New York City in the 1980s and 1990s. Featured characters are dancers and models who compete for trophies and recognition in the underground culture, and who support one another in a network of chosen families known as Houses. Curiel plays a young Dominican orphan named Lil Papi who is a homeless runaway before he is adopted into the House of Evangelista, becoming Lil Papi Evangelista. In season two Papi starts dating his roommate Angel played by Indya Moore.

Curiel's other films to date include Reinaldo Marcus Green's Monsters and Men, and Jordana Spiro's Night Comes On. Both Monsters and Night were featured in the 2018 Sundance Film Festival.

In December 2018, filming of John Leguizamo's Critical Thinking feature about a chess team completed in Florida. Set in Miami in 1998, the story revolves around five players on the Miami Jackson Senior High School team. Curiel plays Rodelay Medina, one of the players from the underprivileged school, whose team wins the National Chess Championship in 1998, and in later life becomes a Chess master.

In July 2019, Curiel was nominated for a 2019 Imagen Award in the "Best Supporting Actor – Television" category for his work as Lil Papi Evangelista on FX's Pose.

In August 2019, Curiel along with other Pose actors took part in the inaugural The Hollywood Reporter and Billboard's Pride Summit held in West Hollywood. They were part of a panel, "Televised Revolution: The Beings of Pose", with Curiel stating, "issues like colorism, transphobia and more have been passed down from previous generations," and "It's time to start unlearning the scripts that were passed down to us". He also shared that "Pose taught him how to show vulnerability in his personal relationships".

In October 2024, Curiel appeared in Part 2 of American Horror Stories, playing a character in the episode "Leprechaun". This marked his first onscreen appearance since the end of Pose.

== Personal life ==
In July 2019, news that Curiel and Pose producer, director, and writer Janet Mock had been romantically involved for a year made national headlines. They had gone to many high-profile events together and vacationed together in the Dominican Republic in July 2018. Curiel asked Mock one day in 2018 if she was happy in her current marriage. Mock was already re-evaluating her marriage saying, "I was like, 'OK, I can't live for what others want. That's not what I'm here for.'"

Curiel has asthma and a heart murmur; he has spoken about being very cautious going back onto set to film season 3 of Pose during the COVID-19 pandemic in New York City, being one of the first TV shows to resume filming in the city.

== Filmography ==
=== Film ===
Year	Title	Role	Notes
2016	American Adrift	Cameron Fernandez	
2018	Night Comes On	Store attendant	
2018	Monsters and Men	Joshua	
2020	Critical Thinking	Rodelay Medina	

=== Television ===
Year	Title	Role	Notes
2018–21	Pose	Lil Papi Evangelista	25 episodes
2024	American Horror Stories	Finn	Episode: "Leprechaun"
