= Monsters and Men =

2018 film

- Film poster
- Directed by: Reinaldo Marcus Green
- Written by: Reinaldo Marcus Green
- Produced by: Luca Borghese; Julia Lebedev; Josh Penn; Elizabeth Lodge; Eddie Vaisman
- Starring: John David Washington; Anthony Ramos; Kelvin Harrison Jr. Chanté Adams; Jasmine Cephas Jones; Cara Buono
- Cinematography: Pat Scola
- Edited by: Justin Chan; Scott Cummings
- Music by: Kris Bowers
- Production companies: The Department of Motion Pictures; Sight Unseen; AgX
- Distributed by: Neon; MoviePass Films
- Release dates: January 19, 2018 (Sundance); September 28, 2018 (United States)
- Running time: 95 minutes
- Country: United States
- Language: English

Monsters and Men is a 2018 American drama film written and directed by Reinaldo Marcus Green. It was screened in the U.S. Dramatic Competition section at the 2018 Sundance Film Festival. It was released on September 28, 2018, by Neon. Although not explicitly stated, the plot shows a similarity with the killing of Eric Garner incident, by which the film was inspired.

== Plot ==
The film tells the stories of three principal characters: Manny, Dennis and Zyrick. It begins with Dennis Williams being pulled over by police but let go because he is a cop himself. The story switches to Manny Ortega applying for a job, but he hesitates on the convicted felon section of the application. Manny lives with his family including his wife Marisol, mother and daughter. Manny goes out to hang out with some of his friends when a cop rolls up near their dice game. In an incident very similar to Eric Garner's death, six police officers attempt to arrest Darius Larson, a friend of Manny's who sells loose cigarettes outside a small bodega. While it's unclear what transpires, a cop fires his gun and kills Darius while Manny is recording the incident on his phone.

A traumatized Manny returns home and rewatches the video. The next day in a newspaper, he sees that cops said Darius was reaching for their gun. While sitting in a park, Manny is confronted by two cops who attempt to intimidate him into not releasing the video. He then tells Marisol that Darius didn't reach for a gun, but she cautions him to avoid any public disclosure because of his new job. Manny sees a suspicious black vehicle outside his building that speeds away when he gets near, so he checks his apartment to make sure it's secure. Not willing to be bullied, he puts his video out on the internet for all to see.

The video has a strong impact in the press and on the street, but shortly afterwards, Manny is arrested by the same cops who tried to intimidate him. During his interrogation, they try to pin a gun to Manny that they found on his friend Victor. The narrative focus then shifts to Dennis Williams, who is watching Manny through the interrogation room's one-way window.

On patrol with his white partner Stacey, Dennis asks her how many times she has been pulled over this year; she says none, but he says it's been six times in six months for him. Dennis is then seen interacting in a playful yet competitive basketball game with local kids, in particular Zyrick, but it is undercut by the fact they spit on the patrol car's door handle. Dennis and his partner are then called in to calm a protest happening at the bodega where Darius was shot by police. They are met by angry protesters shouting at them. Dennis goes home and watches the video of the Larson incident.

The next day, his partner Stacey brings up the fact that internal affairs is looking into the case of the shooting of Darius Larson, and specifically at Officer Scala, who shot Larson. Stacey seems dismissive of the entire incident, but Dennis thinks Scala is a bad cop. Later at dinner with friends, the incident of the shooting comes up in conversation. Dennis defends police as a whole, pointing out that they risk their lives every day, while Lisa argues that a man should not lose his life over cigarettes and that Dennis should be part of the solution. On his drive to the station, he learns that two officers were shot and killed on duty; he attends their funeral. During an internal affairs interview, Dennis does not speak out against Officer Scala. Later, on Dennis' night patrol, Zyrick, the boy who was playing basketball with Dennis earlier, is detained by some other officers. As Dennis drives by, the narrative shifts to Zyrick, who is visibly scared.

After being searched and released by the cops, Zyrick returns home where he and his father live. The next day Zyrick jogs to his private school, where he plays baseball. His coach tells him that recruiting scouts are coming to his upcoming baseball game. On his way home from school, he sees cops detaining another young black man on the street. Back at home, he watches the video of Darius Larson's death. The next day Zyrick finds Zoe, who Zyrick has seen passing out flyers. Zyrick asks to help out with community activism and Zoe introduces him to her group, which is getting ready for a protest against the Larson shooting. A scout comes to recruit Zyrick at his home, but asks him questions about his character that imply racial assumptions. The scout indicates that Zyrick will be recruited, so Zyrick and his father celebrate after the scout leaves. Later, Zoe and Zyrick visit Manny's home. We find out Manny is in prison and Marisol is pregnant with another child.

After working out and training, Zyrick hears his teammates talking about the Larson shooting, casually mocking Larson for "reaching for the gun." Zyrick returns home to find a celebration in his honor, but he leaves for a protest scheduled that same night. As he departs, his father confronts him, saying that Zyrick has a ticket out. Zyrick nevertheless joins the protest, during which the crowd chants "I am... Darius Larson" before they sit down and raise their fists peacefully. The police tell them they will be dispersed by force; soon after the cops start using tear gas and other aggressive measures, whereupon Zyrick runs home. The next day, Zyrick goes to his big game wearing a t-shirt with the words "I am Darius Larson" that Zoe had given him. As he approaches the field, the crowd chants "I am Darius Larson" and Zyrick takes a knee.

== Cast ==
- John David Washington as Dennis Williams
- Anthony Ramos as Manny Ortega
- Kelvin Harrison Jr. as Zyrick
- Rob Morgan as Will Morris
- Chanté Adams as Zoe
- Nicole Beharie as Michelle
- Jasmine Cephas Jones as Marisol Ortega
- Cara Buono as Stacey
- Cassandra Freeman as Lisa
- Angel Bismark Curiel as Joshua

== Reception ==
On the review aggregator website Rotten Tomatoes, 84% of 81 critics' reviews are positive. The website's consensus reads: "Well-acted and visually stylish, Monsters and Men tells its timely story with enough compassion and complexity to make up for occasionally uneven execution." Metacritic, which uses a weighted average, assigned the film a score of 67 out of 100, based on 24 critics, indicating "generally favorable" reviews.

== See also ==
- List of black films of the 2010s
