= Simon Fields =

British television producer

Simon Fields is a British television producer and presenter.

== Early life ==
Fields is a native of London and received his education at Stowe School. After graduation, he worked his way through the television commercial production ranks in London to become production manager for the Moving Picture Company.

== Career ==
In 1978, Fields became a producer for Jon Roseman Productions and moved to L.A. within a year to join its U.S. division. He, producer Paul Flattery and director Bruce Gowers soon left to form Gowers, Fields, Flattery. In 1982, Gowers, Fields, Flattery started representing director Steve Barron of the UK company Limelight in the U.S. In 1983, Fields left Gowers, Fields, Flattery with Barron to form the US version of Limelight, a company focused on music video, commercial and feature film production, with operations in Los Angeles and London. As president and CEO, Fields oversaw a television commercial division whose clients included Calvin Klein, Nike and Budweiser, as well as producing the feature film Teenage Mutant Ninja Turtles. Limelight also became distinguished as a leader in music video production, working on projects with Michael Jackson, Madonna, Prince, Peter Gabriel, A-ha, David Bowie and others.

Toward the end of his twelve-year tenure with Limelight, Fields teamed with director Peter Chelsom in developing and producing feature films. Together they shepherded the Ned Beatty romantic comedy Hear My Song, the Buena Vista distributed Funny Bones starring Oliver Platt and Jerry Lewis (which earned Fields and Chelsom a London Critics Circle Film Award for British Producer of the Year), The Mighty starring Elden Henson, Kieran Culkin and Sharon Stone, Miramax’s romantic comedy Serendipity starring John Cusack and Kate Beckinsale, and the romantic comedy Shall We Dance, starring Richard Gere, Susan Sarandon and Jennifer Lopez.

Simon was the president of Nuyorican Productions from 2004-2013. Through Nuyorican, Fields has produced several feature films and served as Executive Producer on many television productions, including the crime drama Bordertown, starring Jennifer Lopez and Antonio Banderas, the Picturehouse release of El Cantante, the story of salsa pioneer Héctor Lavoe, starring Lopez and Marc Anthony, and the Sony Pictures release of Feel the Noise, a drama set in New York & Puerto Rico. The company has also produced Dancelife, a dance competition reality series for MTV, and the successful TV drama The Fosters on Freeform. Nuyorican also has a non-scripted/reality division and had its first series South Beach Tow premiere on TruTV in July 2011.

Fields' recent endeavors include running Fields Entertainment, continuing his legacy in both scripted and unscripted content. Fields produced The Weight (2026), a historical adventure drama directed by Padraic McKinley, starring Ethan Hawke and Russell Crowe, set in 1933 Oregon.

== Personal life ==
Simon Fields currently resides in Los Angeles with his wife Melanie and two children.
