= Night Comes On =

2018 film by Jordana Spiro

- Film poster
- Directed by: Jordana Spiro
- Written by: Jordana Spiro; Angelica Nwandu
- Produced by: Alvaro R. Valente; Jonathan Montepare; Danielle Renfrew Behrens
- Starring: Dominique Fishback; John Jelks; Max Casella; James McDaniel; Tatum Marilyn Hall
- Cinematography: Hatuey Viveros Lavielle
- Edited by: Taylor Levy
- Music by: Matthew Robert Cooper; Nathan Halpern
- Production companies: Superlative Films; Genera Entertainment; Thunderhead Pictures; Stoneboies Entertainment
- Distributed by: Samuel Goldwyn Films
- Release dates: January 19, 2018 (Sundance); August 3, 2018 (United States)
- Running time: 86 minutes
- Country: United States
- Language: English

Night Comes On is a 2018 American drama film directed by Jordana Spiro, who wrote the screenplay with Angelica Nwandu. The film was developed by Nwandu and Spiro at the Sundance Institute's Screenwriter Lab in 2014. It is inspired by Nwandu's experiences in foster care. The film premiered on January 19, 2018 at the 2018 Sundance Film Festival and was given a limited theatrical and VOD release by Samuel Goldwyn Films on August 3, 2018.

== Plot ==
Angel Lemere is released from juvenile detention on her 18th birthday. As a child, she witnessed the murder of her mother by her father; her intervening years have been spent bouncing around various foster care homes. Now back on the streets, Angel resolves to locate her father and exact revenge on him. Her first imperative is to find her 10 year-old-sister Abby, whom she has not seen in two years, and retrieve their fathers' address. When Angel finds Abby living in a group home, she is dismayed to learn that Abby is living in the same underserved conditions as her and is at risk of following down the same path. Angel's quest for vengeance becomes complicated by her bond with Abby, as the possibility of legal guardianship of her sister hinges on Angel staying out of trouble.

== Cast ==
- Dominique Fishback as Angel Lemere
- Tatum Marilyn Hall as Abby Lemere
- Nastashia Fuller as Angel's mother
- Angel Bismark Curiel as young store attendant
- John Jelks as John Earl Lemere
- Max Casella as Marcus
- James McDaniel as Danny
- Cymbal Byrd as Maya

== Production ==
The idea for the film came about when Jordana Spiro was looking to make a feature about the experiences of foster care kids and what it's like to age out of the system. She had been a volunteer at Peace4Kids, an LA-based foster youth organization, and wanted to write the script with someone who had a personal background in the subject. Through Peace4Kids, she was introduced to writer Angelica Nwandu. Nwandu had herself lost her mother to domestic violence at the hands of her father when she was 6 years old. Nwandu and Spiro worked on the screenplay together over the phone and in person at the 2014 Sundance Institute's Screenwriters Lab.

The film was the recipient of a fellowship from the Adrienne Shelly Foundation, a nonprofit organization that awards grants to female actors, writers, and/or directors of short films, feature films, and documentaries.

Filming was completed in 28 days, with exterior shots done in Philadelphia and New Jersey.

== Release ==
Night Comes On premiered on January 19, 2018, at the 2018 Sundance Film Festival in the Best of Next! section. At the festival, it won the NEXT Innovator Award. It also screened at the Giffoni Film Festival.

In May 2018, Samuel Goldwyn Films acquired distribution rights to the film. It was given both a limited theatrical and VOD release on August 3, 2018.

== Reception ==
Rotten Tomatoes reports a 98% approval rating based on 56 reviews, with an average rating of 7.6/10. The critical consensus reads, "Steadily drawing viewers into its harrowing tale with equal parts grim intensity and startling compassion, Night Comes On heralds the arrivals of debuting director Jordan [sic] Spiro and her magnetic young stars." The review aggregator Metacritic surveyed 15 critics and assessed 14 reviews as positive and 1 as mixed. It gave a weighted average score of 79 out of 100, which it said indicated "generally favorable reviews".

Anne Cohen of Refinery29 wrote the film is a "riveting movie that highlights the power of sisterhood, both on and off screen". Fishback and Hall received acclaim for their performances. In Pajiba, Roxana Hadid wrote how the film "lets moments of silence between Angel and Abby build in the present, presenting two worlds for us to consider: what the girls once had, and what the girls now must do. Would Angel killing their father fix everything? Or nothing?" She continued, Night Comes On "focuses on the challenge of trying to make sense of a situation that makes no sense at all, and its suggestion of revenge is one method, and its suggestion of love is another."

Writing for RogerEbert.com, Matt Zoller Seitz praised the film for avoiding exploitative situations. Though he said the film could have benefited from going "on several beats longer", he felt it "is still an unusual and interesting feature that tries to convey the inner state of a non-communicative young woman mainly through reaction shots of her face. That alone is enough to power it beyond any moment to moment difficulties it might have."

== See also ==
- List of black films of the 2010s
- List of hood films
