= Rachel Bay Jones =

American actress and singer

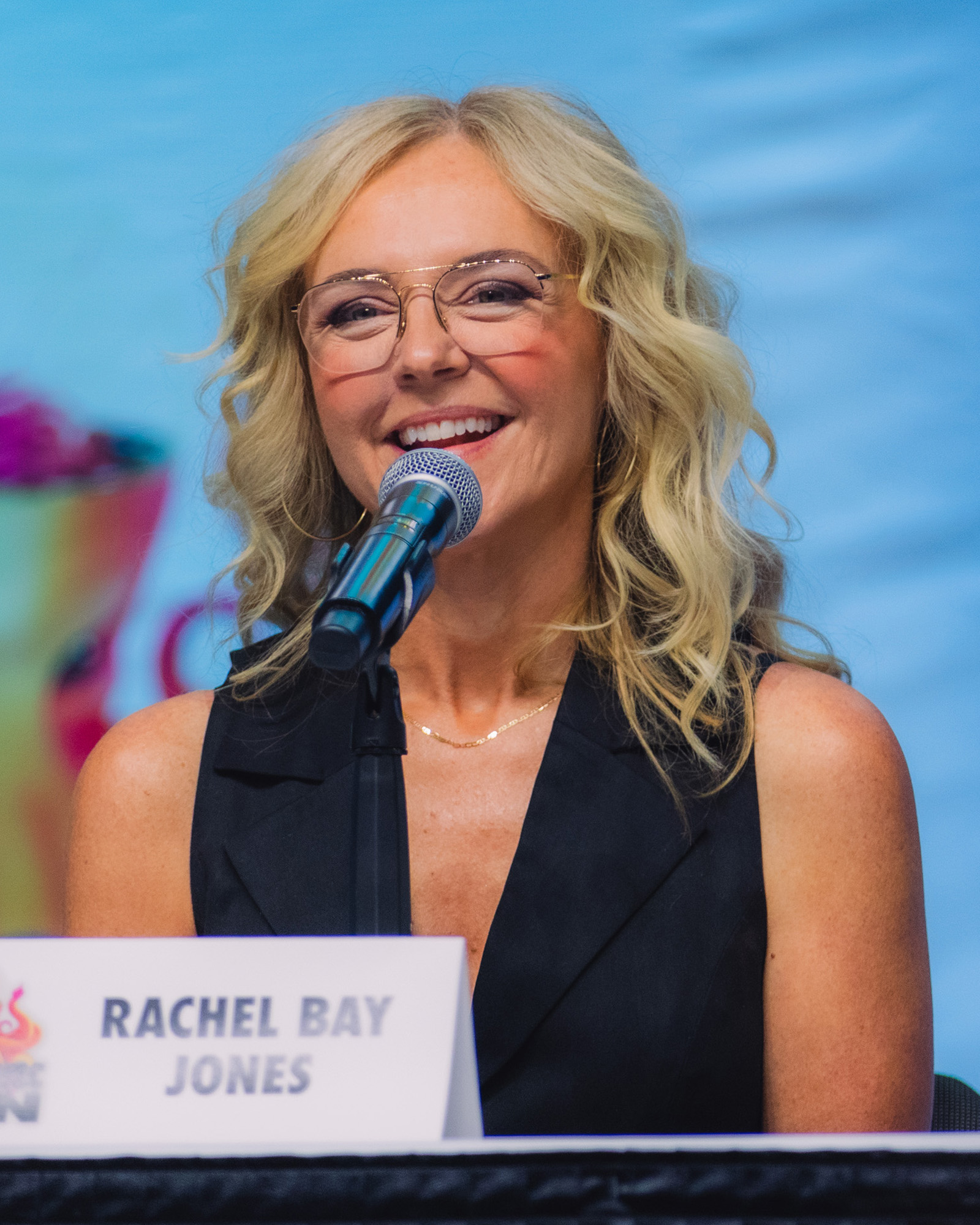
- Jones in 2025
- Occupations: Actress; singer
- Years active: 1989–present
- Partner: Benim Foster
- Children: 1

Rachel Bay Jones is an American actress and singer. She has played the roles of Catherine in the 2013 Broadway revival of Pippin and Evan Hansen's mother, Heidi Hansen, in Dear Evan Hansen. The latter earned her a Daytime Emmy Award, a Grammy Award, and the 2017 Tony Award for Best Featured Actress in a Musical. She emerged as one of few artists to have received three of the four major American entertainment awards.

== Early life ==
Jones's mother is Jewish. Her parents were both Shakespearean actors. She dropped out of high school to perform in a local play, then moved to New York City to pursue acting at 19.

== Career ==
Jones's first Broadway role was as an understudy for the lead role of Esther in Meet Me in St. Louis in 1989.

In the early 1990s, she was in the touring company of Grand Hotel, as well as other national and international tours, performing Rent in German and Evita in Spanish. She performed in the 2009 Broadway revival of Hair as the replacement for Mother, Buddahdalirama, and Member Of The Tribe. She was one of the original cast members starring in the revival of Pippin, playing Catherine, Pippin's lover, during the entire run.

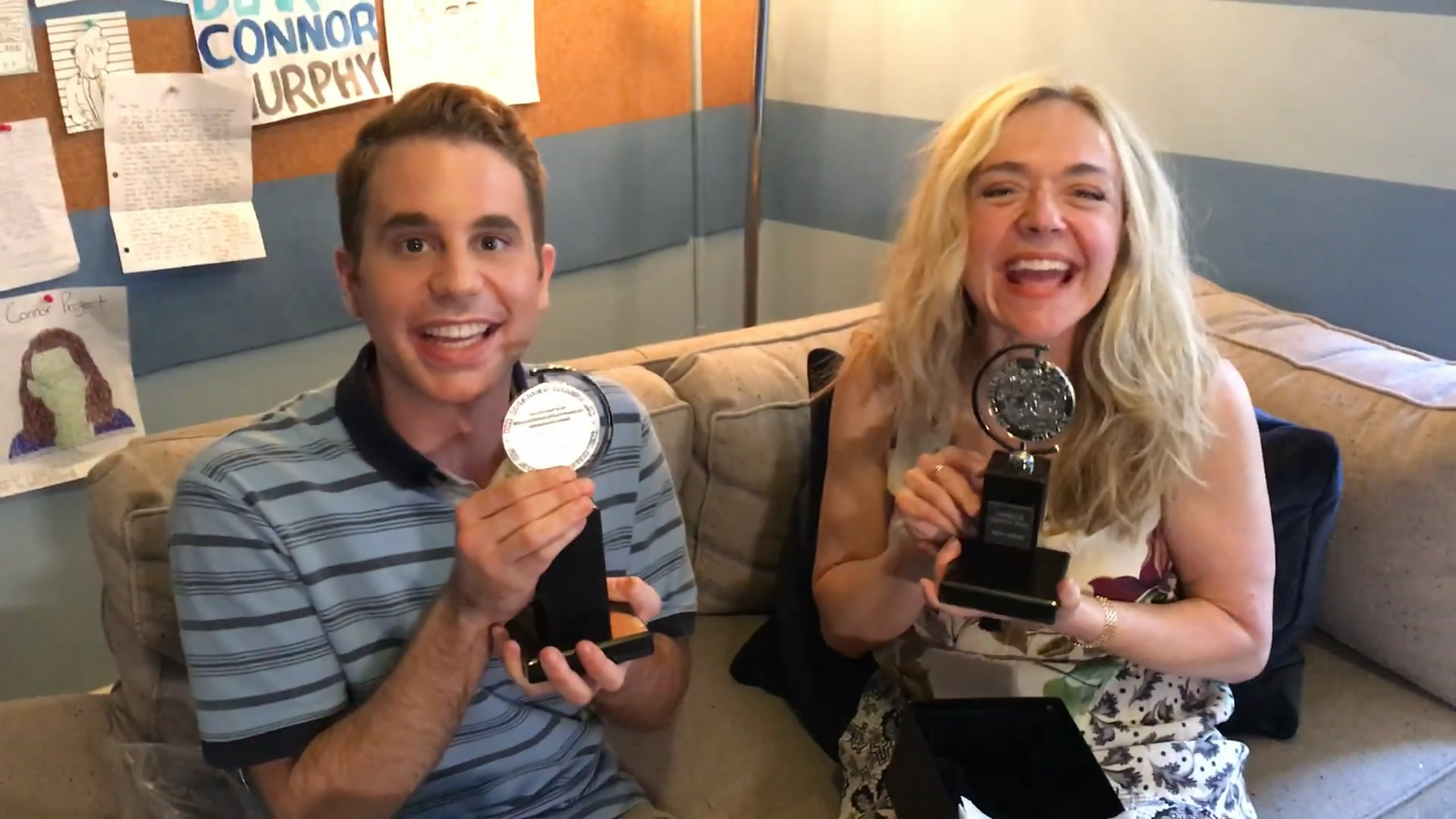
Jones and fellow Dear Evan Hansen cast member Ben Platt with their Tony Awards

Jones portrayed Evan's mother Heidi in the musical Dear Evan Hansen, which premiered at the Arena Stage in Washington, D.C. in July 2015. She reprised the role in the Off-Broadway production at the Second Stage Theatre in May 2016, and then on Broadway starting in November 2016. At the 71st Tony Awards, she won for Best Featured Actress in a Musical for her portrayal of Heidi Hansen.

After leaving Dear Evan Hansen on August 5, 2018, Jones performed at several small venues in Something Beautiful, a one-woman cabaret show that draws music from her expansive career and bringing meaning from her life into the lyrics.

In 2018, Jones appeared in the CBS television drama series God Friended Me, playing the role of Susan. She has also had guest roles on Modern Family and Grey's Anatomy.

She appeared in the concert of Sweet Charity at the Merkin Concert Hall at the Kaufman Music Center on June 17, 2019, presented by the Transport Group.

From January 29 to February 3, 2020, she starred as Diana in Next to Normal at the Kennedy Center Broadway Center Stage series.

In 2021, Jones joined the cast of The Good Doctor as Salen Morrison. This reunited her with former Dear Evan Hansen co-star Noah Galvin (who played the title role, the son of Jones's character, Heidi).

In 2022, she joined the television cast of Young Sheldon, creating the role of Audrey McAllister, the mother-in-law of adult Georgie Cooper. She continued this role in the Young Sheldon spin-off Georgie & Mandy's First Marriage.

Jones originated the role of Marianne in Stephen Sondheim's Here We Are in 2023.

== Personal life ==
She has a daughter, Miranda, and is partner to actor Benim Foster. Jones has one sibling, her brother Darren.

== Acting credits ==
=== Film ===
Year	Film	Role	Notes
2018	Ben Is Back	Beth	
2020	Critical Thinking	Principal Kestel	
2024	Bob Trevino Likes It	Jeanie	

=== Television ===
Year	Title	Role	Notes
2015	Louie	Barbara	Episode: "Untitled"
2016	The Family	Sally	Episode: "Election Day"
2018	Law & Order: Special Victims Unit	Teresa Carisi	Episode: "In Loco Parentis"
2018	God Friended Me	Susan	6 episodes
2019	Modern Family	Farrah Marshall	3 episodes
2019	Grey's Anatomy	Carly	Episode: "Breathe Again"
2021	Panic	Sherri Nill	6 episodes
2021	Why Women Kill	Maisie Moran	3 episodes
2021–2022	United States of Al	Lois	Recurring role
2021–2022	The Good Doctor	Salen Morrison	10 episodes
2022–2024	Young Sheldon	Audrey McAllister	Recurring role
2024-present	Georgie & Mandy's First Marriage	Audrey McAllister	Main cast

=== Theatre ===
Source: Internet Broadway Database

Year	Production	Role	Notes
1989	Meet Me in St. Louis	Ensemble	The Gershwin Theatre
1990	Grand Hotel	Hildegarde Bratts / Trude	National tour
2000	Fiddler on the Roof	Hodel	National tour
2009–2010	Hair	Mother / Buddahdirama / Ensemble	Al Hirschfeld Theatre
2010	Women on the Verge of a Nervous Breakdown	Swing	Belasco Theatre
2011	A Christmas Story: The Musical	Mother	US National tour
2011	Hello Again	The Actress	Off-Broadway, Transport Group
2011	The King and I	Anna Leonowens	Kansas City Starlight Theatre
2012	Pippin	Catherine	American Repertory Theatre
2013–2015	Pippin	Catherine	Music Box Theatre
2015	First Daughter Suite	Rosalynn Carter / Laura Bush	Off-Broadway, The Public Theatre
2015	Dear Evan Hansen	Heidi Hansen	Arena Stage
2016	Dear Evan Hansen	Heidi Hansen	Second Stage
2016–2018	Dear Evan Hansen	Heidi Hansen	Music Box Theatre
2020	Next to Normal	Diana Goodman	Kennedy Centre
2023–2024	Here We Are	Marianne Brink	Off-Broadway, The Shed

== Awards and nominations ==
Year	Awards	Category	Work	Result	Ref.
2016	Drama Desk Awards	Outstanding Featured Actress in a Musical	Dear Evan Hansen	Nominated	
2017	Drama League Awards	Distinguished Performance	Dear Evan Hansen	Nominated	
2017	Lucille Lortel Awards	Outstanding Featured Actress in a Musical	Dear Evan Hansen	Won	
2017	Tony Awards	Best Featured Actress in a Musical	Dear Evan Hansen	Won	
2018	Daytime Emmy Awards	Outstanding Musical Performance in a Daytime Program	Dear Evan Hansen	Won	
2018	Grammy Awards	Best Musical Theater Album	Dear Evan Hansen	Won	
