= Angelica Nwandu =

American journalist and screenwriter

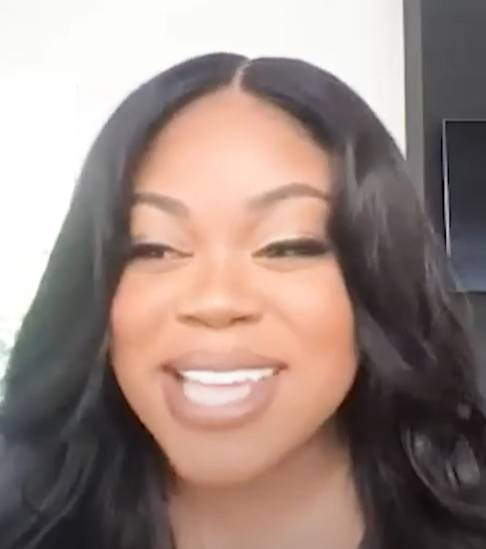
- Nwandu in 2020
- Born: May 10, 1989 (age 37); Los Angeles, California, U.S.
- Occupation: Media personality
- Years active: 2014–present

Angelica Nwandu (born May 10, 1989) is an American media personality. She is the founder of the Shade Room, an Instagram-based media company focused on celebrity gossip. Nwandu was dubbed "The Oprah of [her] generation" by Refinery29 and a "celebrity culture savant" by Complex. Time magazine named TSR in the 30 most influential on the internet in 2016. The New York Times called the Shade Room "Instagram's TMZ".

== Early life and education ==
Angelica Nwandu was born in 1989 in Los Angeles, California, to Nigerian parents. In a November 2025 interview with Proximity Media, she revealed that her father murdered her mother when she was six years old. Subsequently, Nwandu grew up in foster care. She graduated from Loyola Marymount University.

== Career ==
=== The Shade Room ===
In 2016, Forbes named Nwandu to its 30 Under 30 list, saying she "revolutionized celebrity gossip" with the founding of the Shade Room. Cosmopolitan reports that the Shade Room's followers across platforms now total more than eight million people. TechCrunch named her to its list of "18 Female Founders Who Killed It in 2015" and BuzzFeed says Nwandu is "figuring things out faster than everyone else."

=== Film ===
Nwandu has also been a Sundance fellow and Time Warner HBO fellow 2014 selected for the January 2014 Screenwriters Lab. The project, developed with co-writer Jordana Spiro, is called Night Comes On. It premiered at the 2018 Sundance Film Festival where it won the NEXT Innovator award. Samuel Goldwyn Films acquired the film for distribution, with a simultaneous theatrical and VOD release set for August 3, 2018.
