= Lakatriona Brunson =

Actor

- Born: Miami, Florida, US
- Other names: Bernice
- Occupations: Actress, football coach, teacher
- Years active: 2012–2014
- Known for: South Beach Tow

Lakatriona Brunson is an American teacher, athlete, coach and actress. She is best known for her character Bernice on the truTV television series South Beach Tow.

== Early life and education ==
Lakatriona Brunson was born and raised in Miami, Florida. She attended Miami Northwestern Senior High School in the 1990s, where she excelled in track and field and basketball. She continued competing in college, both in track and field and as a power forward on the basketball team at Tennessee State University.

== Career ==
Brunson is widely known for her performances as Bernice, a tow truck operator on the docudrama TV series South Beach Tow. The show, shown in reality TV format (although some portions are reenactments), based itself on the operations of a towing operation in southern Florida, Tremont Towing. Bernice's character traits include disposing of unruly members of the public and referring to herself in the third-person. She is known for wearing sunglasses in her TV role and otherwise. Although Tremont Towing is an actual towing company used by the city of Miami Beach for towing illegally parked cars, the show's cast were fictionalized employees.

Brunson continued competing athletically as a defensive end for the Miami Fury football team of the Independent Women's Football League.

Brunson is also a certified physical education teacher. When she was named head coach of the Miami Jackson High School football team in February 2016, she became the first female football coach in Florida. Brunson coached girls' flag football at Jackson and was an assistant coach for the girls' basketball team. Luther Campbell, known internationally as rapper Luke Skyywalker of the 1980s group 2 Live Crew, was hired as an assistant coach and was a defensive coordinator. However, he resigned his position after nine months. Brunson has known Campbell since her childhood.

== Personal life ==
Brunson has remained a resident of Miami.
