= Critical Thinking (film) =

- Official poster
- Directed by: John Leguizamo
- Written by: Dito Montiel
- Produced by: Carla Berkowitz; Scott Rosenfelt; Jason Mandl
- Starring: John Leguizamo; Jorge Lendeborg Jr.; Angel Bismark Curiel; Will Hochman; Corwin Tuggles; Jeffry Batista; Ramses Jimenez; Rachel Bay Jones; Michael K. Williams
- Cinematography: Zach Zamboni
- Edited by: Jamie Kirkpatrick
- Music by: Chris Hajian
- Production companies: Chaplin/Berkowitz Productions; Cinema Veritas; Hialeah Park Studios; Shrodinger’s Cat Productions
- Distributed by: Vertical Entertainment
- Release date: September 4, 2020
- Running time: 117 minutes
- Country: United States
- Language: English
- Budget: $3 million

Critical Thinking is a 2020 American biographical drama film based on the true story of the 1998 Miami Jackson High School chess team, the first inner-city team to win the U.S. National Chess Championship.

Critical Thinking was directed by John Leguizamo (in his directorial debut), written by Dito Montiel, executive produced by Carla Berkowitz and Harvey Chaplin, and stars Leguizamo alongside Jorge Lendeborg Jr., Angel Bismark Curiel, Will Hochman, Corwin Tuggles, Jeffry Batista, Ramses Jimenez, Rachel Bay Jones and Michael K. Williams. It was released on September 4, 2020 by Vertical Entertainment.

== Plot ==
In 1998 inner-city Miami, Sedrick is an African-American student living with his widowed father, a knowledgeable chess player. He decides to take chess as an "easy" elective and meets Cuban-American teacher Mario Martinez, known to his students as Mr. T. In the class, he also meets Ito, a student who works long hours after school to support his single mother; the class includes class clown Roddy, and Gil, who is of Spanish descent.

Principal Kestel, who does not see the value of the chess club at the school and views it as a de facto detention hall, threatens to redirect funding from the club to the school's football team; however, she decides to offer the team an opportunity to fundraise by selling candy bars. When the boys scheme to convert the candy bars into marijuana infused-cookies goes awry, Mr. T uses his personal savings to register the team in the regional chess tournament. The team wins the tournament to advance to the state championship, and at the end of the road trip Sedrick happily tells his dad about his victory. Sedrick's father tells him to get his life straight and decide on his future rather than waste his time on chess. Ito loses his job because of his decision to go out of town to the tournament and his mother throws him out of her apartment, leading him to quit the chess team. The rest of the team realizes that they need money to register for the state championship. They also need Ito, who previously qualified for the regional. If they can't achieve both, they risk forfeiting.

The boys face interrogation from police officers who believe that they have information about the murder of another student by a local drug dealer. Soon after, Ito, dealing with financial troubles, is recruited by a drug kingpin because of his knack with numbers. The boys raise funds for the state championship by washing cars. They also recruit a new member, Marcel, whom Mr. T calls Duchamp. At the last minute, Ito changes his mind and travels with the boys to the tournament. An airline company had promised free tickets via sponsorship for them if they make it to the nationals, which they narrowly qualify for due to Ito's refusal to accept a draw, after which he loses due to a zugzwang. He stays at home to fix his life, with a drug dealer, Andre, threatening to hand him over to the police if he tries to quit.

Ito invites Donny and Andre over under the pretense of talking about business, but Andre suspects something to be off about the meeting. He seizes Ito's Walkman and forbids him from answering the phone, and talks about Sedrick and his girl Chanakya and what he might do to them. Ito gets angry and grabs Andre, bashing his head on a freezer until Andre is unconscious. Ito then leaves the store and walks into the street.

The boys progress well and are pitted against Akopyan, the three-time, back-to-back reigning champion. Akopyan plays individually against Marcel, who has the best record on the team. At some point in the game, Akopyan, who is having a difficult time beating Marcel, decides to take a bathroom break and suggests that Marcel should do the same. However, Akopyan mistakenly leaves his clock timer running. In the bathroom, Akopyan tries to talk Marcel into accepting a draw, and Marcel replies that a win is all his team needs to win the tournament. When the game resumes, Akopyan is upset to find his clock running which puts Marcel up in a time advantage. However, Marcel waits about three minutes and a half without a move to level the game time, and the two finalists resume the game on an equal footing. Eventually, Akopyan has to resign as his position is obviously losing. Marcel is crowned as the new champion alongside the boys and Mr. T.

During the end credits, the real-life chess team and coach are shown.

== Cast ==
- John Leguizamo as Mario Martinez aka Mr. T
- Michael K. Williams as Mr. Roundtree
- Rachel Bay Jones as Principal Kestel
- Corwin Tuggles as Sedrick Roundtree
- Jorge Lendeborg Jr. as Ito Paniagua
- Angel Bismark Curiel as Rodelay Medina
- Will Hochman as Gil Luna
- Jeffry Batista as Marcel Martinez
- Zora Casebere as Chanayah
- Ramses Jimenez as Andre Lamar
- Todd Allen Durkin as Detective Ransone
- Ziggy Marley as Elizabeth Reagan

== Production ==
In November 2015, it was announced that John Leguizamo, Jorge Lendeborg Jr., Michael K. Williams, Angel Bismark Curiel, Will Hochman, Jeffrey Battista, Corwin Tuggles and Rachel Bay Jones had joined the cast of the film, with Leguizamo directing from a screenplay written by Dito Montiel.

Principal photography began in November 2018 and was filmed over 20 days, on a budget of US$3 million.

== Release ==
Critical Thinking was scheduled to have its world premiere at South by Southwest in March 2020. However, the festival was cancelled due to the COVID-19 pandemic. Shortly after, Vertical Entertainment acquired distribution rights to the film. It was released on September 4, 2020.

== Critical reception ==
Critical Thinking holds a 94% approval rating on review aggregator website Rotten Tomatoes, based on 33 reviews, with an average of 7.1/10. Metacritic report a score of 65 out of 100 based on 9 critic reviews, indicating "generally favorable" reviews.
