= South Beach Tow =

American television series (2011–2014)

- Robert Ashenoff Jr., Robert Ashenoff Sr., and Christie Ashenoff
- Genre: Docudrama
- Created by: Jennifer Lopez; Simon Fields
- Starring: Lakatriona Brunson; Christie Ashenoff; Robert Ashenoff Jr; Jerome "J-Money" Jackson; Eddie Del Busto; Dave Kosgrove; Davy DeSoto; Gilbert Perez; Niki Whalen Gutierrez
- Country of origin: United States
- Original language: English
- No. of seasons: 4
- No. of episodes: 87

Production
- Executive producers: Anthony Horn; Benjamin Nurick; Miguel A Vargas; Jessica Shreeve; Josh Ackerman; Simon Fields; Zachary Werner; Steven Derek Booth
- Running time: 24 minutes
- Production companies: Bodega Pictures; Nuyorican Productions

Original release
- Network: truTV
- Release: July 20, 2011 – December 10, 2014

South Beach Tow is an American television series that portrayed dramatized reenactments of the day-to-day business of Tremont Towing, a family-run towing business in Miami Beach, and South Beach Towing, a towing company in Gladeview created by the workers of Tremont in Season 4. It was produced by Bodega Pictures and Nuyorican Productions, and it aired on the American cable channel truTV, running for 4 seasons from July 20, 2011, to December 10, 2014. The final episode titled "Checkmate" aired on December 3, 2014, which ended the story on a major cliffhanger. A week later, a bonus episode ("Bernice's Top Twenty") aired on December 10, concluding the series with a total of 87 episodes. The series then went into limbo and was presumed cancelled. Though truTV has never made an official statement of its cancellation, the network has since removed it from its programming. Although the program is fictionalized, Tremont Towing and South Beach Towing are real towing companies in Miami Beach and Gladeview, respectively.

== Inception ==
According to the cast member Christie Ashenoff, the idea for the program came after Tremont towed the car of Simon Fields: "He tells us that a few days later a light bulb went off in his head that if he lost his mind, that everyone else must too." Jennifer Lopez produces the program through her production company, Nuyorican Productions.

== Plot ==
The show's scenes generally center on the cast towing vehicles and facing different levels of opposition from vehicle owners. South Beach Tow also portrays Tremont Towing engaging in several disputes with a rival towing company called The Finest Towing (which eventually becomes Goodfellas). The Finest is owned by Robert Sr's rival, Larry Diaz shown to employ very corrupt drivers who go as far as stealing tows, injuring Tremont drivers, and once putting sugar in several of Tremont's trucks' gas tanks. Larry is also a rage driven man built on taking down Robert and Tremont Towing. The drivers at Finest responsible for the latter were arrested on camera, although those scenes were part of the staged script. Tremont Towing continues to rival with Finest, now named "Goodfellas" - which is now part of Tremont. After the Mid-Season Finale of Season 3, Perez convinced Robbie to work on the side with him at his own towing company which was called R&P Towing (Robbie & Perez). Robbie eventually got fed up with Christie being in charge of Tremont when he felt he should have gotten the manager promotion and she makes a big decision without him (she was thinking about selling Tremont to Felix Hernandez ), so with that Robbie quits Tremont. Christie eventually found out in Season 3 Episode 23 (50 Shades of Bernice), that Perez and Robbie were working together. Perez then locked everyone out of Tremont which gave him the opportunity to steal the repo orders. In the Season 3 Finale (Deuces, Tremont), Christie and Perez planned a partnership between R&P and Tremont, which ends up being the end Tremont and R&P Towing . In the Season 4 Premiere, (Apocalypse Tow) things go haywire when the R&P Towing office explodes (due to a towed person throwing his cigarette in the building while they were in the middle of an exterminating process and had a gas leak), but they were able to get this back on track.

In the second episode of Season 4 (Flipping Out), the crew moved to Miami, located at the former Goodfellas lot, which is now called "South Beach Towing" thanks to Kosgrove coming up with the name. Meanwhile, Bernice and her mother, Reva, start a food truck business out of a food truck they repossessed in the Season 3 Finale. In episode 13 of Season 4 (Checkmate) Robbie made a deal with Perez to give him 51% stake in the company in order to save the yard from being rezoned. The show ended with a cliffhanger after the news is spread to Christie.

== Staged performances ==
Although the show is officially classified as a reality television program, it depicts actors performing reenactments of events. When questioned on the program's veracity, a spokesman said that the show "features real people and is based on real situations. Due to production needs, some scenes are reenacted." At the end of each episode, during the credits, a disclaimer is now posted "The stories that are portrayed in this program are based on real events."

Prior to truTV's admission that scenes were reenacted, several news outlets reported evidence that the show was not a true "day in the life" documentary. Rumors persisted about the obvious use of wireless microphones by everybody with a speaking part in the show and the over the top nature of much of the program's content. The celebrity gossip blog Radar posted a video of actors politely awaiting the start of a violent scene.

== Cast ==
=== Tremont Towing drivers ===
- Lakatriona Brunson – Bernice (assistant manager as of Season 3)
- Jerome "J-Money" Jackson – driver
- Eddie Del Busto – driver
- Gilbert Perez – driver
- Robert "Robbie" Ashenoff Jr. – Son of Robert Ashenoff Sr. and senior driver at Tremont Towing
- Davy Desoto – driver (started in Season 3)
- Frankie – driver (only in Season 1)

=== Tremont Towing office managers ===
- Christie Ashenoff – dispatcher at Tremont Towing (later general manager) and daughter of Robert Ashenoff Sr.
- Robert Ashenoff Sr. – founder, owner, and general manager of Tremont Towing.
- Dave Kosgrove – dispatcher as Tremont Towing (Started in Season 2) and former Miami-Dade County Inspector.

=== South Beach Towing office managers ===
- Lakatriona "Bernice" Brunson – assistant manager and driver
- Christie Ashenoff – general manager (25%)
- Robert Ashenoff Jr – Co-general manager (24%)
- Gilbert Perez – Co-general manager (51%)
- Dave Kosgrove – Dispatcher

=== South Beach Towing Drivers ===
- Lakatriona "Bernice" Brunson – driver (assistant manager)
- Jerome "J-Money" Jackson – driver
- Eddie Del Busto – driver
- Gilbert Perez – driver
- Robert "Robbie" Ashenoff Jr. – driver
- Davy Desoto – driver
- Niki Whalen Gutierrez – driver (as of Season 4; introduced in the Season 3 finale as she stole Perez's money

== Episodes ==
=== Series overview ===
Season	Episodes	Originally released	
Season	Episodes	First released	Last released
1	21	July 20, 2011	May 23, 2012
2	26	September 19, 2012	August 14, 2013
3	26	October 30, 2013	June 25, 2014
4	14	September 10, 2014	December 10, 2014

=== Season 1 (2011–12) ===
No. overall	No. in season	Title	Original release date	US viewers (millions)
1	1	"A Family Business"	July 20, 2011	1.63
2	2	"Tow Wars"	July 20, 2011	1.57
3	3	"Chaos in the Yard"	July 27, 2011	1.50
4	4	"Broken Truce"	August 3, 2011	1.45
5	5	"Training Day"	August 10, 2011	1.43
6	6	"Anger Management"	August 17, 2011	1.70
7	7	"Muay Thai Surprise"	August 24, 2011	1.53
8	8	"Memorial Day Mayhem"	August 31, 2011	1.39
9	9	"Growing Pains"	February 15, 2012	1.31
10	10	"Taking Out the Trash"	February 22, 2012	1.66
11	11	"Assault on Tremont Towing"	February 29, 2012	1.16
12	12	"Sand in the Face"	March 7, 2012	1.51
13	13	"The Hurricane"	March 21, 2012	1.18
14	14	"Unlicensed to Drive"	March 28, 2012	1.32
15	15	"Stranded"	April 4, 2012	1.22
16	16	"Search and Rescue"	April 18, 2012	0.96
17	17	"A Very Tremont Christmas"	April 25, 2012	1.09
18	18	"The Dog House"	May 2, 2012	1.36
19	19	"Money All Day"	May 9, 2012	1.53
20	20	"Trouble at Tremont"	May 16, 2012	1.35
21	21	"Goodfellas"	May 23, 2012	1.41

=== Season 2 (2012–13) ===
No. overall	No. in season	Title	Original release date	US viewers (millions)
22	1	"Bernice Pops Off"	September 19, 2012	1.62
23	2	"The Heat is On"	September 26, 2012	1.33
24	3	"Lights Out"	October 3, 2012	1.11
25	4	"No Country for Perez"	October 10, 2012	1.52
26	5	"Ruthless"	October 17, 2012	1.64
27	6	"What's Up With Christie?"	October 24, 2012	1.83
28	7	"The Last to Know"	October 31, 2012	1.44
29	8	"Black Dahlia"	November 7, 2012	1.43
30	9	"The Inspection"	November 14, 2012	1.67
31	10	"Hit It and Quit It"	November 21, 2012	1.39
32	11	"Storm Clouds"	November 28, 2012	1.63
33	12	"Go Down Towing"	December 5, 2012	1.73
34	13	"Snakes in the Yard"	December 12, 2012	1.54
35	14	"Who's the Boss?"	May 15, 2013	1.43
36	15	"Run These Streets"	May 22, 2013	1.42
37	16	"Wide Load"	May 29, 2013	1.21
38	17	"Compromising Positions"	June 5, 2013	1.60
39	18	"For Love or J-Money"	June 12, 2013	1.31
40	19	"The In-Laws"	June 19, 2013	1.57
41	20	"Everybody Hates Tremont"	June 26, 2013	1.53
42	21	"Big and Beautiful"	July 10, 2013	1.38
43	22	"Bumps in the Night"	July 17, 2013	1.75
44	23	"Tremont on Wheels"	July 24, 2013	1.48
45	24	"Kosgrove Gets Krunk"	July 31, 2013	1.66
46	25	"Christie's Choice"	August 7, 2013	1.80
47	26	"A Tremont Wedding"	August 14, 2013	1.51

=== Season 3 (2013–14) ===
No. overall	No. in season	Title	Original release date	US viewers (millions)
48	1	"Tremont Got Served"	October 30, 2013	0.85
49	2	"Caged Heat"	November 6, 2013	0.78
50	3	"Bernice Goes Down"	November 13, 2013	1.28
51	4	"Here Kitty"	November 20, 2013	1.11
52	5	"Dave's Dance Battle"	November 27, 2013	1.07
53	6	"Bernice's Revenge"	December 4, 2013	1.28
54	7	"The Incredible Journey"	December 11, 2013	1.10
55	8	"Roommates"	December 18, 2013	1.39
56	9	"Bernice Unleashed"	December 25, 2013	N/A
57	10	"Casanova Kosgrove"	January 1, 2014	1.46
58	11	"Touchy-Feely"	January 8, 2014	1.43
59	12	"Fashion Disaster"	January 15, 2014	1.05
60	13	"The Struggle is Real"	January 22, 2014	1.17
61	14	"Face Plant"	March 26, 2014	0.91
62	15	"Game Changer"	April 2, 2014	0.95
63	16	"Little Man, Big Donk"	April 8, 2014	1.00
64	17	"Take the Money"	April 16, 2014	1.09
65	18	"Spanglish"	April 29, 2014	0.83
66	19	"Creepin"	May 7, 2014	0.84
67	20	"Sink or Swim"	May 14, 2014	N/A
68	21	"Adios Kosgrove"	May 21, 2014	0.90
69	22	"Mystery Date"	May 28, 2014	1.26
70	23	"50 Shades of Bernice"	June 4, 2014	N/A
71	24	"Perez Strikes Back"	June 11, 2014	N/A
72	25	"On the Floor"	June 18, 2014	N/A
73	26	"Deuces, Tremont"	June 25, 2014	N/A

=== Season 4 (2014) ===
No. overall	No. in season	Title	Original release date	US viewers (millions)
74	1	"Apocalypse Tow"	September 10, 2014	1.62
75	2	"Flipping Out"	September 17, 2014	1.62
76	3	"The Legend of the Swamp Ape"	September 24, 2014	1.62
77	4	"Pulling the Plug"	October 1, 2014	N/A
78	5	"A Taste of Bernice"	October 8, 2014	N/A
79	6	"Maximum Power"	October 15, 2014	N/A
80	7	"Family Therapy"	October 22, 2014	N/A
81	8	"Towyard of Terror"	October 29, 2014	N/A
82	9	"The Customer Is Always Wrong"	November 5, 2014	N/A
83	10	"Crazy in Love"	November 12, 2014	N/A
84	11	"South Beach Glo"	November 19, 2014	N/A
85	12	"Pain & Gain"	November 26, 2014	N/A
86	13	"Checkmate"	December 3, 2014	N/A
87	14	"Bernice's Top Twenty"	December 10, 2014	N/A

== Broadcast ==
In America the series premiered on the channel truTV on July 20, 2011, and ended on December 10, 2014. The show concluded with Season 4 Episode 14 (Bernice's Top Twenty).

In Italy, the series premiered on DMAX in 2011 and is now ended.

In Australia, the series premiered on GO! on September 1, 2015.
