= Miami Jackson Senior High School =

Coordinates: 25.8104°N 80.2268°W

Location
- 1751 NW 36th St; Miami, Florida 33142; United States

Information
- Type: Public secondary
- Established: 1898
- School district: Miami-Dade County Public Schools
- Principal: Rennina Turner
- Teaching staff: 55.00 (FTE)
- Grades: 9–12
- Enrollment: 1,290 (2023–2024)
- Student to teacher ratio: 23.45
- Campus: Urban
- Color
- Mascot: General
- School hours: 7:20 AM to 2:20 PM
- Website: jacksonshs.org

Miami Jackson Senior High School, also known as Andrew Jackson High School or Jackson High School, is a high school located at 1751 NW 36th Street in the Allapattah neighborhood of Miami, Florida, United States. Its athletic team name is the Generals.

== History ==
Jackson High School began as a grade school. The original building was a log cabin built in 1898 on land donated by L.J. Becker. In its first year there were only 14 students.

It was replaced by a four-room grade school which was more than doubled later with the addition of a five-room annex. Due to the growth of northwestern Miami, more rooms had to be added. In 1926, a three-story high school building was added. The building was the Jackson High School main campus building until 2008, when a new campus was built on the school's athletic fields; the original building was demolished and its area used for the new athletic fields. Jackson's renovation was a part of a program to rebuild all high schools in Miami-Dade County, and was the second school to be rebuilt after Miami Beach High School. The former building was the third-oldest high school building in Miami-Dade County, Florida after Beach High and the historical campus at Miami High School. The tenth grade was added in 1936, and by 1939 the eleventh and twelfth grades were added. By then, the elementary grades had been dropped. Jackson's first graduating class had 79 students.

== Demographics ==
Miami Jackson High is 67% Hispanic, 32% Black and 1% White non-Hispanic.

== Academics ==
The State's Accountability program grades a school by a complex formula which looks at both current scores and annual improvement on the Reading, Math, Writing and Science FCATs.

The school's grades by year since the FCAT began in 1998 are:

- 1998-99: D
- 1999-00: D
- 2000-01: D
- 2001-02: F (259 points)
- 2002-03: F (259 points)
- 2003-04: F (270 points)
- 2004-05: D (289 points)
- 2005-06: F (272 points)
- 2006-07: D (397 points)
- 2007-08: C (407 points)
- 2008-09: F (390 points)
- 2009-10: D (825 points)
- 2010-2011: A (1,056 points)
- 2011-2012: A
- 2012-2013: B
- 2013-2014: B (1041 points)
- 2014-2015: C
- 2015-2016: C
- 2016-2017: C

== Notable alumni ==
=== Actors and entertainers ===
- Edward Muscare - Class of 1951; television and YouTube personality
- Angela Pitts - Class of 2002; contestant on Flavor of Love 3; best known as Myamee; winner of I Love Money 2
- Andrew Prine - Class of 1954; veteran film, stage and television actor, with over 150 movies and TV episodes to his credit
- Bob Vila - Class of 1962; host of television's This Old House
- Constance Weldon - Class of 1950; America's first female professional tubist

=== Artists ===
- Firelei Báez

=== Military ===
- Manuel J. "Pete" Fernandez - Class of 1943; Korean War ace, 14 kills

=== Sports ===
==== Basketball ====
- Mychal Thompson - Class of 1974; 33-0 State Championship team (stripped of title by the FHSAA for using four ineligible players); two-time NBA champion with Los Angeles Lakers; sports broadcaster

==== Baseball ====
- Warren Cromartie - Class of 1971; played in Major League Baseball with Montreal Expos (1974–1983) and Kansas City Royals (1991); also spent many years playing in Japan
- John Harris - Class of 1973; played in Major League Baseball with California Angels (1979-1981)
- Lenny Harris - played in Major League Baseball with Cincinnati Reds (1988–1989, 1994–1998), Los Angeles Dodgers (1989–1993), New York Mets (1998, 2000–2001), Colorado Rockies (1999), Arizona Diamondbacks (1999–2000), Milwaukee Brewers (2002), Chicago Cubs (2003) and Florida Marlins (2003–2005)
- Fred Norman - Class of 1961; played 16 years in Major League Baseball (1962–80) with various teams, including Kansas City Athletics, Chicago Cubs, and Cincinnati Reds
- Rafael Palmeiro - Class of 1982; played in Major League Baseball with Chicago Cubs (1986–1988), Texas Rangers (1989–1993, 1999–2003) and Baltimore Orioles (1994–1998, 2004–2005); played collegiately at Mississippi State University
- Bobby Ramos - Class of 1974; played in Major League Baseball with Montreal Expos (1978, 1980–1981, 1983–1984) and New York Yankees (1982)
- Mandy Romero - Class of 1984; played in Major League Baseball from 1997 - 2003; drafted by Pittsburgh Pirates in 19th round of 1988 MLB amateur draft; also played for San Diego Padres and Colorado Rockies

==== Chess ====
Ito Paniagua, Rodelay Medina, Gil Luna, Sedrick Roundtree, and Marcel Martinez, whose 1998 National Championship was made into Critical Thinking, a 2020 film.

==== Football ====
Miami Jackson High football team is managed by Lakatriona Brunson.

- Joe Brodsky - Class of 1953; former NFL assistant coach
- Curry Burns - former NFL safety
- Lee Corso - Class of 1953; played collegiately at Florida State University; served as head coach of Indiana University and University of Louisville; now a broadcaster with ESPN
- Elvis Dumervil - Class of 2002; All-Pro linebacker in NFL, #92 for Denver Broncos
- Nick Ferguson - former NFL safety
- Quinton Flowers - NFL running back for the Cincinnati Bengals
- John Edward Harris (1956- ) - safety, played 11 seasons for NFL's Seattle Seahawks and Minnesota Vikings; intercepted 50 passes in his career, second most in team history
- Cecil Johnson - former NFL linebacker
- David Little - linebacker, played for University of Florida and 12 seasons for Pittsburgh Steelers
- Stefan Logan - running back in Canadian Football League; also played for Pittsburgh Steelers
- Joe McCall - former NFL running back
- Fred Robinson - NFL defensive lineman, linebacker, with San Diego Chargers (1984–1986) and Miami Dolphins (1986); played collegiately at University of Miami
- Mike Strachan - former NFL running back
- Robenson Therezie - former NFL cornerback
- Elliott Walker - former NFL running back

==== Olympics ====
- Manuel Huerta - Class of 2002; US 2012 Olympian in triathlon

== See also ==
- Miami-Dade County Public Schools
- Education in the United States
