= John Leguizamo =

Colombian and American comedian, actor and filmmaker (born 1960 or 1964)

- Leguizamo in 2026
- Born: John Alberto Leguizamo Peláez; July 22, 1960 (age 66) or July 22, 1964 (age 62); Bogotá, Colombia
- Citizenship: Colombia; United States
- Occupations: Actor; comedian; producer; director
- Years active: 1984–present
- Spouses: Yelba Osorio (m. 1994; div. 1996) Justine Maurer (m. 2003)
- Children: 2

Comedy career
- Medium: Film; stand-up; television
- Genres: Improvisational comedy; observational comedy; character comedy; blue comedy; musical comedy; satire
- Subjects: Latin American culture; childhood; self-deprecation; family; sex; marriage; parenting; race relations; racism; human sexuality; everyday life

John Alberto Leguizamo Peláez (/ˌlɛɡwɪˈzɑːmoʊ/, LEG-wih-ZAH-moh; Colombian Spanish: [leɣiˈsamo]; born July 22, 1960 or 1964) is a Colombian and American comedian, actor and filmmaker. He has received various accolades, including a Special Tony Award in 2018 for his body of theatre work and for bringing diverse stories to Broadway theatre.

Leguizamo began his career as a stand-up comedian in New York City. He portrayed Luigi Mario in Super Mario Bros. (1993) before earning a Golden Globe Award for Best Supporting Actor nomination for his role in To Wong Foo, Thanks for Everything! Julie Newmar (1995). He has acted in films such as Carlito's Way (1993), Romeo + Juliet (1996), The Pest (1997), Spawn (1997), Summer of Sam (1999), Moulin Rouge! (2001), Land of the Dead (2005), Ride Along (2014), Chef (2014), John Wick (2014), John Wick: Chapter 2 (2017), The Menu (2022), Bob Trevino Likes It (2024), and The Odyssey (2026). He also voiced Sid the Sloth in the Ice Age franchise (2002–present) and Bruno Madrigal in Encanto (2021).

Leguizamo is also known for his television roles including his HBO special Freak (1998), a filmed version of his eponymous Broadway show, for which he received a Primetime Emmy Award for Outstanding Individual Performance in a Variety or Music Program. This was a historic win, making Leguizamo the first ever Latino to win this award. He was further Emmy-nominated for his roles in the Paramount miniseries Waco (2018) and the Netflix miniseries When They See Us (2019). He has also acted in ER (2005–2006) and Bloodline (2016–2017). He hosted the MSNBC series Leguizamo Does America (2023) and PBS series American Historia: The Untold History of Latinos (2024).

For Broadway productions he has performed and written, he received four Tony Award nominations, two for Freak (1998), and one each for Sexaholix (2002) and Latin History for Morons (2018).

== Early life and education ==
Leguizamo was born in Bogotá, Colombia, the son of Luz Marina Peláez and Alberto Rudolfo Leguizamo. His father was once an aspiring film director and studied at Cinecittà in Rome, Italy, but eventually dropped out due to lack of finances.

Leguizamo has Indigenous Colombian (Muisca), European (especially Iberian), and some African ancestry. His paternal grandfather was a wealthy Colombian landowner, and his great-great-grandfather Higinio Cualla was Mayor of Bogotá for sixteen years in the late 1800s and is considered an important modernizer of the city. Before this discovery, Leguizamo had claimed that he was Puerto Rican on his father's side, which was one of the reasons he was selected as the Puerto Rican Day Parade Global Ambassador of the Arts, and marched in the parade on June 12, 2011. He also claimed partial Lebanese and Italian ancestry before testing his DNA. It was determined that Leguizamo's maternal lineage includes the 16th-century Spanish conquistador Sebastián de Belalcázar, as well as Jerónimo Betuma, a 17th-century indigenous Colombian of noble birth.

When Leguizamo was 3 or 4 years old, his family emigrated to New York City, where they lived in various neighborhoods in Queens, including Jackson Heights. He later credited growing up as one of the first Latino children in the neighborhood as formative in his acting ability: "It was tough. There were lots of fights. I would walk through a park and be attacked, and I had to defend myself all the time. But this helped me to become funny so that I wouldn't get hit." His parents divorced when he was 13, and he lived with his mother while growing up. Leguizamo and his family constantly moved apartments in Queens, attending multiple elementary schools. Leguizamo was arrested twice as a teenager, once for jumping a turnstile at a New York City Subway station and another time for truancy. His family later sent him to Colombia for a year where he stayed with his relatives. Leguizamo learned how to box at around 19-years-old.

Leguizamo attended Joseph Pulitzer Middle School (I.S.145) and later Murry Bergtraum High School. As a student at Murry Bergtraum, he wrote comedy material and tested it on his classmates. He was voted "Most Talkative" by his classmates. After graduating from high school, he began his theater career as an undergraduate at NYU's Tisch School of the Arts, in which he stated he was the only Latino student in the program.He eventually dropped out in favor of a career in stand-up comedy. Post-NYU, Leguizamo enrolled at LIU Post and at HB Studio, where he took theater classes.

== Career ==
=== Early career ===
Leguizamo started as a stand-up comic doing the New York nightclub circuit in 1984, and in 1988, he performed at The Public Theater in two shows, including as Puck in A Midsummer Night's Dream in which he appeared with Fisher Stevens. He made his television debut in 1986 with a small part in Miami Vice. His other early roles include a friend of Madonna's boyfriend in her "Borderline" video (1984) and Private First Class Dìaz in Casualties of War (1989). In the early 1990s, he played a terrorist in Die Hard 2 (1990), Johnny in Hangin' with the Homeboys, and a robber in Regarding Henry (both 1991). In 1991, Leguizamo also wrote and performed in the Off-Broadway production Mambo Mouth, where he played seven different characters. Mambo Mouth won an Obie Award and an Outer Critics Award. He was listed as one of 12 "Promising New Actors of 1991" in "John Willis' Screen Worlds Vol. 43".

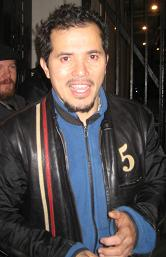
Leguizamo in 2008

In 1992, Leguizamo starred in Whispers in the Dark as John Castillo. In 1993, he portrayed Luigi Mario in the film Super Mario Bros., based on the Mario video game franchise. Despite being a critical and financial failure, the film was considered to be his breakthrough role, allowing him to appear in more successful comedic roles in the following years. That same year, he had a prominent role in Brian De Palma's Carlito's Way as Carlito Brigante's nemesis, "Benny Blanco from the Bronx," which also boosted his career in serious roles, and wrote and performed in the one-man show Spic-O-Rama, where he made fun of the stereotyping of Latinos in the United States. The production won a Drama Desk Award and four Cable ACE Awards. Both Mambo Mouth and Spic-O-Rama were later filmed for presentation on HBO.

In 1995, Leguizamo created, produced, wrote, and starred in the 1995 Latino-oriented variety show House of Buggin' on Fox Television. Some audiences saw this as the Latino version of In Living Color. The show showcased Leguizamo's well-known ability to assume a wide variety of colorful, energetic characters, but due to poor ratings, the show ran less than one season. Leguizamo also starred in Romeo + Juliet (1996) as Tybalt Capulet, as Violator in Spawn, Cholo in Land of the Dead, and Pestario 'Pest' Vargas in The Pest, the latter being one of his few roles as a lead actor in a major film. In 1995, he co-starred as drag queen Chi-Chi Rodriguez in To Wong Foo, Thanks for Everything! Julie Newmar, for which he received a Golden Globe nomination for Best Supporting Actor, and he appeared in the 1996 action film Executive Decision as Captain Rat. In 1998, he debuted on Broadway in the production of Freak, a semi-autobiographical one-person play that was filmed for HBO and released on October 10, 1998, with Spike Lee sitting in as director. The show won him the Drama Desk Award for Outstanding One-Person Show and the Primetime Emmy Award for Outstanding Individual Performance in a Variety or Music Program. In 1999, Leguizamo appeared in a lead role as Vinny in Summer of Sam, which was written and directed by Lee.

=== 2000–2009 ===
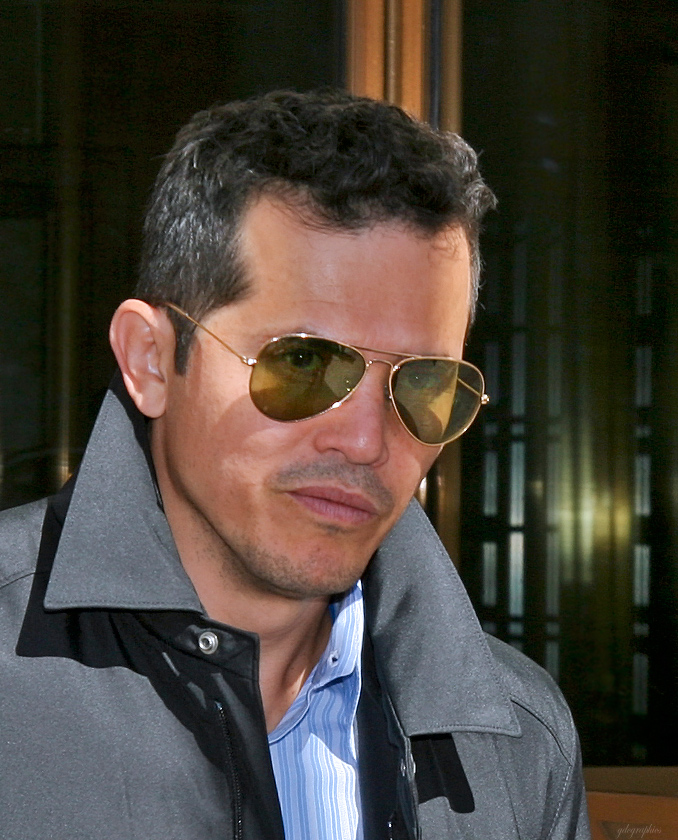
Leguizamo at the 2007 Toronto International Film Festival

In 2000, Leguizamo portrayed both Genies in Arabian Nights, a TV mini-series adaptation of the epic One Thousand and One Nights. In 2001, RCA/BMG Records released John Leguizamo LIVE, a CD compilation of Leguizamo's stage routines. Among the bits is a primer Leguizamo gives on the history and culture of Latinos in America, which includes the dubious tale of the mating of an Inca princess with a Spanish conquistador, thus creating the original dysfunctional Latin family, each member of which is voiced by Leguizamo. The CD also includes a musical intermission, with two salsa/hip-hop tunes, "The Night Before Christmas" and "Gotta Get Some", and footage from Leguizamo's tours and two interactive games, "Spanish Fly Pick-Up Line".

To promote the 2001 film Moulin Rouge!, he appeared on a celebrity edition of the American version of Who Wants to Be a Millionaire? with Kelly Ripa, Kevin Sorbo, Alfre Woodard, Martin Short and Chevy Chase. Appearing as the first celebrity to sit in the hot seat, he eventually tried for $125,000 but got the answer wrong. In 2002, he starred in the movie Empire. That same year, he wrote and performed in Sexaholix... A Love Story, which explained his love life and how he started his own family. Later in 2002, on the syndicated version, a question about the movie featured his character, and Meredith Vieira mentioned that Leguizamo had played Lautrec and had been on the show. In 2002, he voiced Sid the Sloth for the film Ice Age, reprising the role for the sequels Ice Age: The Meltdown, Ice Age: Dawn of the Dinosaurs, Ice Age: Continental Drift and Ice Age: Collision Course. The game versions of the films also used his voice. In 2003, he voice-acted Globox from Rayman 3: Hoodlum Havoc. Leguizamo portrayed Paul in the Brad Anderson thriller film Vanishing on 7th Street.

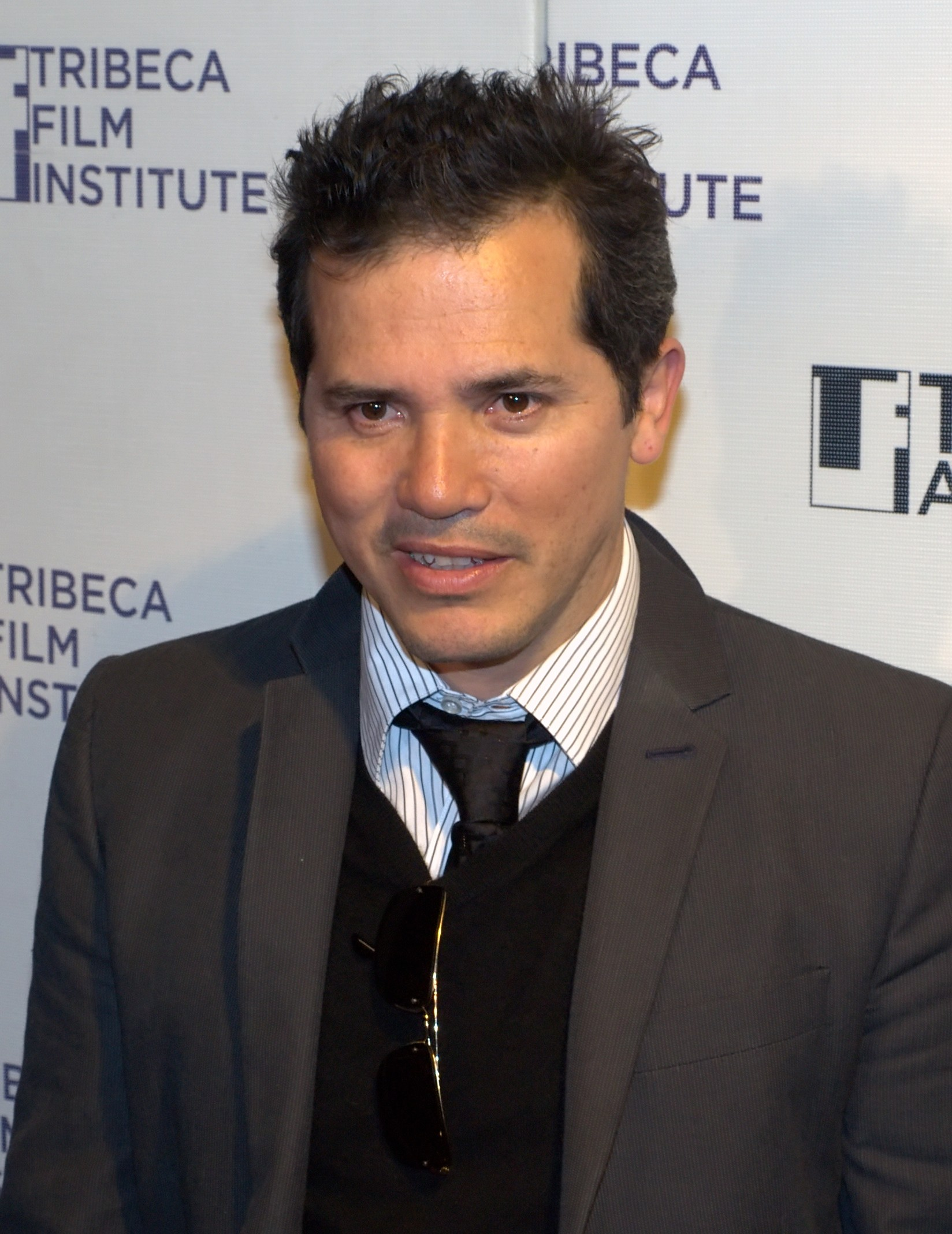
Leguizamo at the 2010 Tribeca Film Festival

In 2004, he guest-starred on Dora the Explorer as Captain Pirate Piggy. During the 2005–06 television season, Leguizamo joined the cast of the show ER, playing the emotionally disturbed Dr. Victor Clemente, a new attending who is keen on introducing the staff of County General to better ways of treating patients and cutting-edge technology. Clemente, however, was plagued with personal problems and was fired from the hospital near the end of the season. Dr. Clemente's departure from the show was a blessing for Leguizamo. He revealed to CraveOnline that he was not happy working on the television program. "I was depressed doing ER," he admitted, "I started gaining weight, I was eating doughnuts, I started smoking again. I'm eating McDonald's, things that I know when I'm depressed, I do. I tried to kill myself internally."

In 2006, Leguizamo starred in the television pilot for Edison, a 2006 CBS drama about a Los Angeles detective (played by Leguizamo) who relied on impersonations and disguises to solve crimes. Other cast members included Currie Graham and Deidrie Henry. Kevin Rodney Sullivan directed from a script by Ron Milbauer and Terri Hughes. Leguizamo and David Hoberman also served as executive producers. In October 2006, Leguizamo's memoir, Pimps, Hos, Playa Hatas and All the Rest of My Hollywood Friends: My Life, was released. During an interview on Late Night with Conan O'Brien, he stated that his memoir was very candid about experiences involving other celebrities he had worked with. He stated that working with Arnold Schwarzenegger on Collateral Damage (2002) was one of the most enjoyable experiences he'd had as an actor, that Schwarzenegger's accent let him say things that others would think were sexist or homophobic if said by someone else, and that Steven Seagal was an egotist with diva tendencies.

In 2007, he played Michael Beltran in the movie The Babysitters. In 2008, he co-starred in the movie The Happening, written and directed by M. Night Shyamalan. In July 2007, Spike TV aired its drama series The Kill Point, which starred Leguizamo, Donnie Wahlberg, and Michael Hyatt. The show was an eight-part series revolving around ex-war veterans whose bank robbery went wrong, thus ending in a hostage situation. Despite high ratings, The Kill Point was not renewed for a second season. A year later, Leguizamo guest-starred on Sesame Street as Captain Vegetable, who tells Elmo to eat his vegetables.

=== 2010–2016 ===
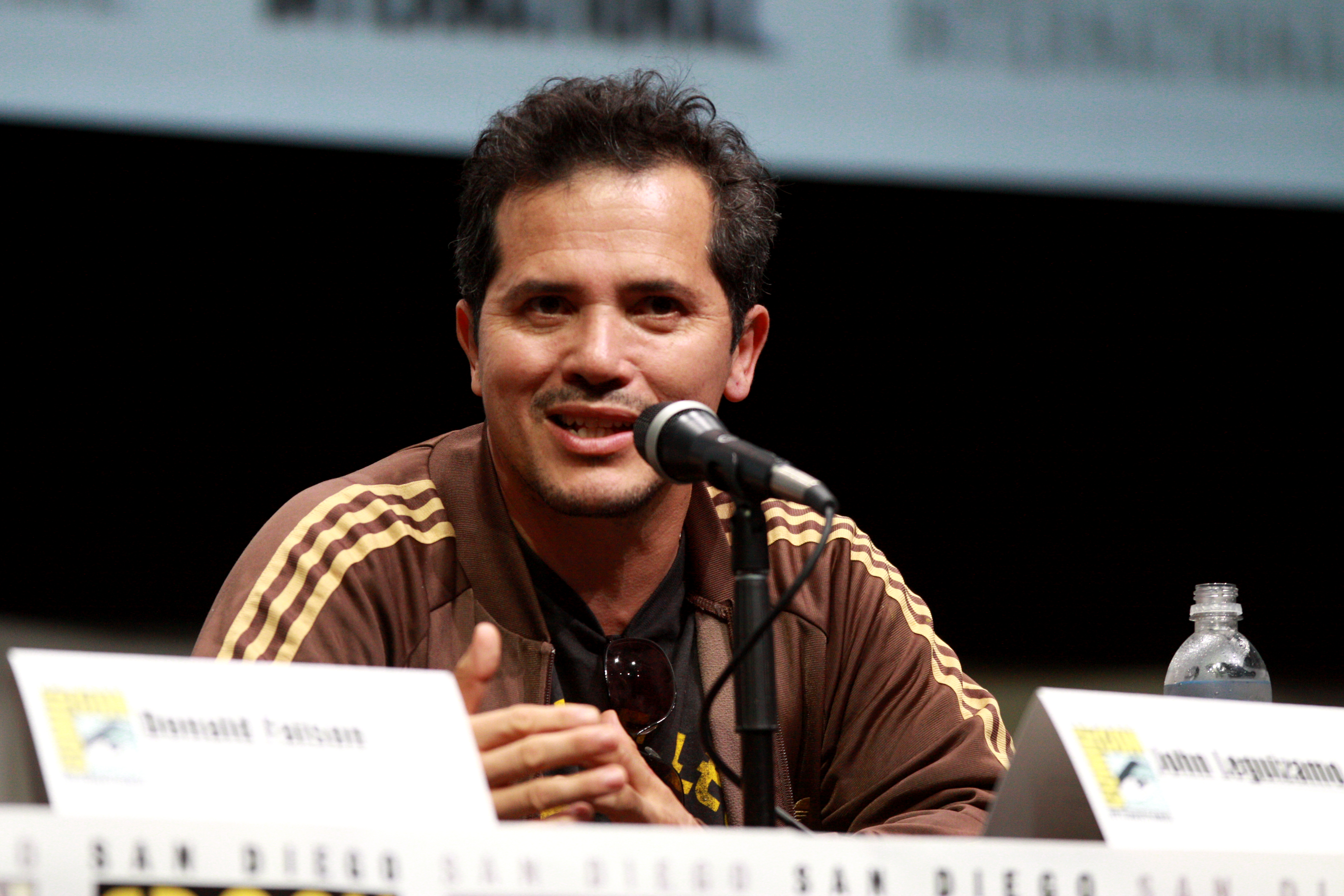
Leguizamo in 2013

In 2010, Leguizamo also guest-starred on The Electric Company as himself, rhyming about commas and quotation marks. In June 2010, Leguizamo opened his semi-autobiographical one-man theater show, Klass Klown (later renamed Ghetto Klown), based on his memoir Pimps, Hos, Playa Hatas, and All the Rest of My Hollywood Friends: My Life. After the show had run at various theaters in the United States, and Leguizamo had performed an "unplugged" version of it under the title John Leguizamo Warms Up at a Chicago theater, it opened on Broadway in March 2011 at the Lyceum Theatre. The show, about Leguizamo's path from obscurity to stardom, opened to many positive reviews and was extended through July 10, 2011. A CD of the show was released. In 2011, Leguizamo received the Outer Critics Circle Award for Outstanding Solo Performance, and the Drama Desk Award for Outstanding Solo Performance for his performance in the show. In September 2011, Leguizamo began an international tour of Ghetto Klown in Los Angeles. On July 13, 2012, PBS debuted Tales From a Ghetto Klown, a documentary about Leguizamo's life and the show's development. On November 16, 2013, Leguizamo taped Ghetto Klown at The New Jersey Performing Arts Center in Newark, NJ for HBO.

In 2012, Leguizamo was cast as Derek Trotter in the American remake of the British BBC sitcom Only Fools and Horses. In October 2013, Leguizamo started filming for The Crash, starring alongside Frank Grillo, AnnaSophia Robb, Dianna Agron, Ed Westwick, Minnie Driver, Mary McCormack, Christopher McDonald and Maggie Q. The film is directed by Aram Rappaport and produced by Hilary Shor, Atit Shah and Aaron Becker. In 2014 Leguizamo starred alongside Jon Favreau in Chef as the line cook Martin, a role he prepared for by working as an actual line cook at The Lion in the West Village. Also in 2014, he played a drug dealer in the action comedy film American Ultra alongside Jesse Eisenberg and Kristen Stewart. He also starred in John Wick as Aurelio in 2014. The Crash was released on January 13, 2017.

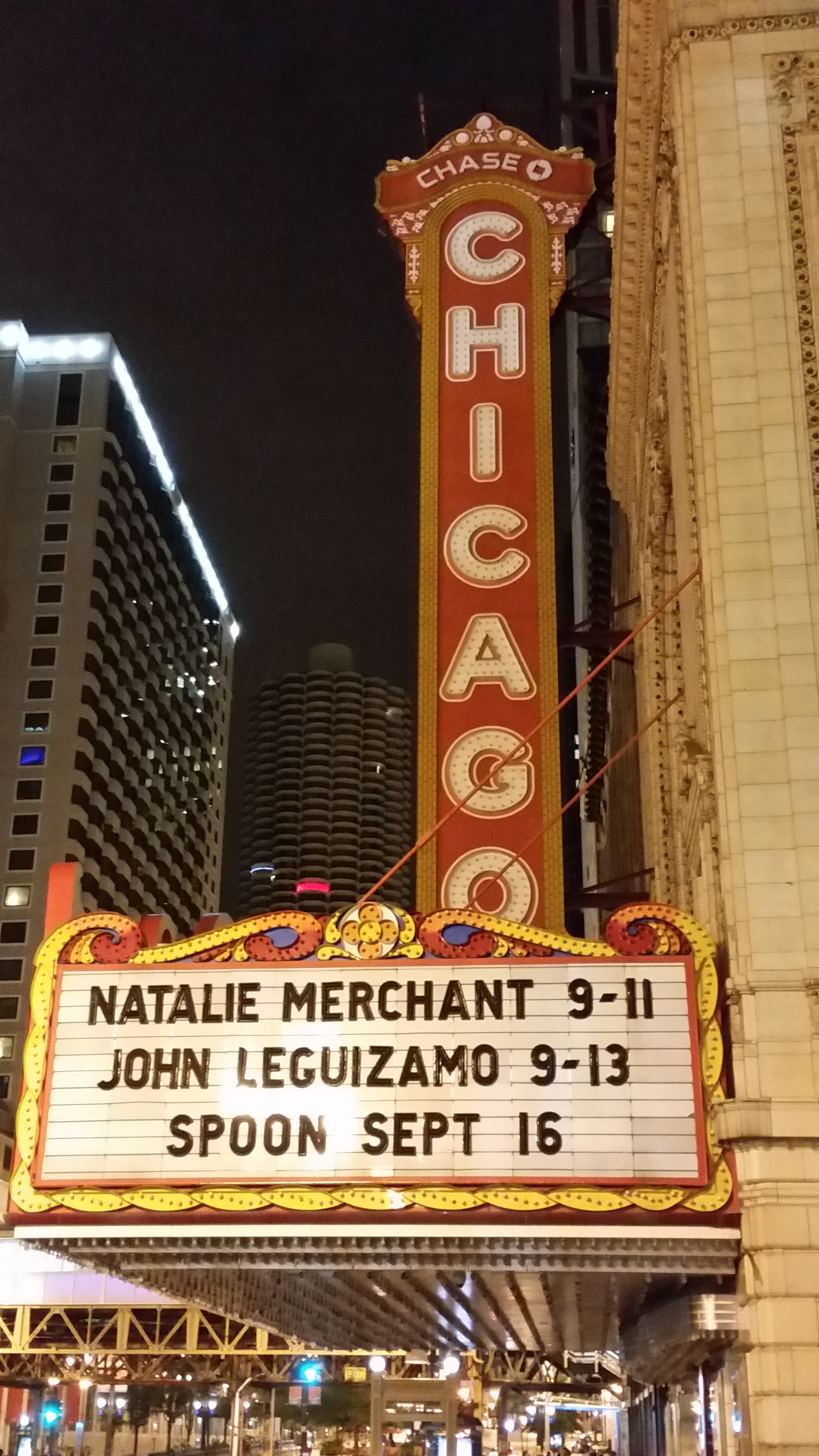
Leguizamo appearing at the Chicago Theatre in September 2014

In 2015, Abrams ComicArts published the graphic novel adaptation of Leguizamo's one-man Broadway show, Ghetto Klown. As with the live show, the graphic novel explores the actor/comedian's life and career, beginning with his adolescence in Queens, New York, his involvement in 1980s avant-garde theater, his feature film career, and some of the colorful characters he encountered throughout his life. Leguizamo describes the work:

"Ghetto Klown is the history that I probably never should have told anyone but my therapist, but it's a real lesson that even if you suffer a certain amount (a lot) of self-doubt and anxiety, you can still accomplish great things. It's a lesson I'm really excited to impart to a whole new audience."

The comic is illustrated by Christa Cassano. In 2016, Leguizamo played the role of Ozzy Delvecchio in the second season of the Netflix original series Bloodline. Also in 2016, he produced the Q Brothers' Othello: The Remix at off-Broadway's Westside Theatre.

=== 2017–present ===
In 2017, Leguizamo sang on "Almost Like Praying", a charitable song written and composed by Lin-Manuel Miranda. Proceeds from the song went to the Hispanic Federation to assist relief efforts for those in Puerto Rico who were affected by Hurricane Maria. Also in 2017, he debuted Latin History for Morons, a show about the participation of Latin Americans throughout US history. The show premiered at the Public Theater before moving to Studio 54. Latin History for Morons was nominated for the 2018 Tony Award for Best Play. That year, he also was presented with a Special Tony Award for his body of work and for his commitment to bringing diverse stories and audiences to Broadway for three decades. In January 2018, Leguizamo was announced as the host of the 63rd Obie Awards held in May 2018 at Terminal 5.

In 2018, Leguizamo played undercover ATF agent Jacob Vazquez in the Paramount Network miniseries Waco. The following year, Leguizamo played Raymond Santana Sr. in the Netflix miniseries When They See Us. Leguizamo wrote the original musical Kiss My Aztec, with book by Leguizamo and director Tony Taccone, music by Benjamin Velez, and lyrics by Velez, Leguizamo, and David Kamp. It was developed at the Public Theater in 2018 and premiered at Berkeley Repertory Theater and La Jolla Playhouse in 2019, where it received critical acclaim. Leguizamo also received Smithsonian Magazine's 2018 American Ingenuity Award in the History category.

In 2020, Leguizamo played Gor Koresh in season 2, episode 1 of the Disney+ series The Mandalorian. In 2021, he played Estragon opposite Ethan Hawke as Vladimir in Waiting for Godot and Wallace Shawn with The New Group Off Stage as a video performance during the COVID-19 pandemic. In 2021, Leguizamo provided the voice of Bruno Madrigal in the Disney animated film Encanto, which received the Academy Award for Best Animated Feature. In 2022, he acted in the critically acclaimed Mark Mylod-directed comedy-horror film The Menu alongside Anya Taylor-Joy and Ralph Fiennes, where he played a washed-up movie star attending an exclusive restaurant with his assistant, played by Aimee Carrero. Leguizamo based his character on Steven Seagal, with whom he co-starred in Executive Decision. In 2022, he played Scrooge in the Christmas action comedy Violent Night.

In 2023, he briefly hosted The Daily Show after Trevor Noah's departure; Leguizamo was part of a series of rotating guest hosts. His brief tenure was a ratings hit, becoming the second most-watched of the rotating guests only behind Al Franken. Other guest hosts included Sarah Silverman, Hasan Minhaj, Roy Wood Jr., Wanda Sykes, Leslie Jones, Kal Penn, Chelsea Handler, and Marlon Wayans. It also was announced he would host the MSNBC series Leguizamo Does America, premiering on April 16 of that year. In summer 2023, his play, Our Hood, an adaptation of Thornton Wilder's Our Town, had its first reading at the Guthrie Theater under the direction of Maija Garcia.

Leguizamo is the host of the PBS series, American Historia: The Untold History of Latinos, which premiered September 27, 2024. Leguizamo played Nelson Castro in the play The Other Americans, which ran from September 11, 2025, to October 19, 2025, at The Public Theater.

== Personal life ==
Leguizamo married actress Yelba Osorio in 1994 and divorced in 1996 after two years of marriage.

He married Justine Maurer, a costumer on Carlito's Way, on June 28, 2003. Leguizamo was Catholic, and Maurer is Jewish. They have two children, daughter Allegra Sky Leguizamo (born 1999) and son Ryder Lee "Lucas" Leguizamo (born 2000). They live in Manhattan. In 2026, he identified himself as an "ex-Catholic".

Leguizamo credits production for Romeo + Juliet for getting into fitness, including weight lifting. He is an avid tennis player who also does dance sessions. He also delves into free writing.

In 2008, Leguizamo received the Rita Moreno HOLA Award for Excellence from the Hispanic Organization of Latin Actors (HOLA). In 2011, he received the Made in NY Award from New York City. In 2018, Leguizamo received an Honorary Degree from Marymount Manhattan College. Leguizamo gave the commencement speech to the Class of 2022 at Vassar College.

== Activism ==
In 2004, Leguizamo was one of the celebrity supporters of Voto Latino, co-founded by Rosario Dawson. In 2012, he co-founded NGL (Next-Generation Latinx) Collective to create content for Latinx audiences. Backed by GoDigital Media Group, in 2022 NGL merged with mitú "to create the largest digital-first "Latinx powerhouse" in the US." Leguizamo has also been heralded as a preservationist for the Greenwich Village Society for Historic Preservation.

Leguizamo has also been an activist directly through his artistic work. In 2017, he opened Latin History for Morons at The Public, and it later went to Broadway. Netflix filmed it in 2018, advocating that "teaching Latin history is the first step toward conquering prejudice." In 2020, Leguizamo's directorial debut, Critical Thinking, was released. He starred in the biographical drama set in 1998 about an inner-city teacher and students who compete in the US National Chess Championship. He said that he wanted to, "create a universal message of hope and spread this message to the world." In 2022, he performed Ghetto Klown "at Rikers Island Correctional Facility for an audience of young convicts."

Leguizamo is an outspoken critic of Hollywood's whitewashing in the casting of movies. In 2022, he spoke out against the casting of James Franco to portray Fidel Castro in the upcoming film Alina of Cuba: La Hija Rebelde, stating "I don't got a prob with Franco, but he ain't Latino!" In a 2023 interview with TMZ, Leguizamo, who previously starred in the 1993 Super Mario Bros film, criticized The Super Mario Bros. Movie for having actors Chris Pratt and Charlie Day voice the Italian-American Mario and Luigi, saying "No I will not [be watching]. They could've included a Latin character, like I was groundbreaking, and then they stopped the groundbreaking. They messed up the inclusion. They dis-included. Just cast some Latin folk! We're 20% of the population. The largest people of color group, and we are underrepresented."

Leguizamo is an advocate for LGBTQ+ rights. In 2023, he, alongside other figures, appeared in a video produced by Teen Vogue and online magazine Them called Dear Trans Youth affirming his support for transgender youth.

Leguizamo has been an outspoken critic of Donald Trump's immigration policies. In early 2025 he condemned the administration's mass-deportation agenda as an attack that "dehumanizes" Latino immigrants, and in August 2025 he criticized actor Dean Cain for becoming an honorary ICE officer. In January 2026, amid celebrity opposition to ICE following the killings of Renée Good and Alex Pretti in Minneapolis as a result of Operation Metro Surge, Leguizamo posted a video telling fans who support the agency to stop following him, captioned "Abolish ICE". He also joined Lin-Manuel Miranda and Constance Wu in "The People's Filibuster," an anti-ICE event at The Public Theater.

On The Moment with Jorge Ramos and Paola Ramos, Leguizamo identified as a Democratic Socialist.

== Filmography ==
=== Film ===
Selected credits

- Casualties of War (1989)
- Revenge (1990)
- Die Hard 2 (1990)
- Poison (1991)
- Regarding Henry (1991)
- Hangin' with the Homeboys (1991)
- Whispers in the Dark (1992)
- Super Mario Bros. (1993)
- Carlito's Way (1993)
- A Pyromaniac's Love Story (1995)
- To Wong Foo, Thanks for Everything! Julie Newmar (1995)
- Romeo + Juliet (1996)
- The Fan (1996)
- Executive Decision (1996)
- The Pest (1997)
- Spawn (1997)
- Dr. Dolittle (1998)
- Summer of Sam (1999)
- Titan A.E. (2000)
- Moulin Rouge! (2001)
- What's the Worst That Could Happen? (2001)
- Ice Age (2002)
- Empire (2002)
- Spun (2002)
- Zig Zag (2002)
- Crónicas (2004)
- Land of the Dead (2005)
- Ice Age: The Meltdown (2006)
- The Happening (2008)
- Miracle at St. Anna (2008)
- Ice Age: Dawn of the Dinosaurs (2009)
- Gamer (2009)
- One for the Money (2011)
- The Lincoln Lawyer (2011)
- Ice Age: Continental Drift (2012)
- Kick-Ass 2 (2013)
- The Counselor (2013)
- Ride Along (2014)
- Chef (2014)
- John Wick (2014)
- Experimenter (2015)
- Meadowland (2015)
- American Ultra (2015)
- Sisters (2015)
- Ice Age: Collision Course (2016)
- The Infiltrator (2016)
- John Wick: Chapter 2 (2017)
- Nancy (2018)
- Playing with Fire (2019)
- The Night Clerk (2020)
- Critical Thinking (2020)
- The Survivor (2021)
- Encanto (2021)
- The Menu (2022)
- Violent Night (2022)
- Bob Trevino Likes It (2024)
- Zootopia 2 (2025)
- The Odyssey (2026)
- Ice Age: Boiling Point (2027)
- The Exorcist: Martyrs (2027)
- Untitled Daniels film (2027)
- Miami Vice '85 (2028)

=== Television ===
Selected credits

- Miami Vice (1986–1989)
- Mambo Mouth (1991)
- House of Buggin' (1995)
- Freak (1998)
- Arabian Nights (2000)
- The Brothers Garcia (2000–2004)
- ER (2005–2006)
- My Name Is Earl (2006)
- The Kill Point (2007)
- Ice Age: A Mammoth Christmas (2011)
- Ice Age: The Great Egg-Scapade (2016)
- Bloodline (2016–2017)
- Waco (2018)
- Latin History for Morons (2018)
- When They See Us (2019)
- The Mandalorian (2020)
- Fairfax (2021–2022)
- The Power (2023)
- Leguizamo Does America (2023)
- The Green Veil (2024)
- Smoke (2025)

== Awards and nominations ==
Year	Award	Category	Title	Result	Ref.
1999	ALMA Award	Outstanding Performance by an Individual or Act in a Variety or Comedy Special	John Leguizamo: Freak	Won	
2000	ALMA Award	Outstanding Actor in a Feature Film	Summer of Sam	Nominated	
2001	ALMA Award	Host of a Variety or Awards Special	My VH1 Music Awards	Won	
2002	ALMA Award	Outstanding Actor in a Motion Picture	King of the Jungle	Nominated	
2002	ALMA Award	Outstanding Supporting Actor in a Motion Picture	Moulin Rouge!	Nominated	
2002	ALMA Award	Entertainer of the Year		Received	
2009	ALMA Award	Year in Film - Actor	Nothing Like the Holidays	Won	
2010	Annie Awards	Voice Acting in a Feature Production	Ice Age: Dawn of the Dinosaurs	Nominated	
2022	Annie Awards	Voice Acting in a Feature Production	Encanto	Nominated	
1998	Blockbuster Entertainment Awards	Favorite Supporting Actor – Horror	Spawn	Nominated	
1992	CableACE Award	Performance in a Comedy Special	The Talent Pool	Won	
1994	CableACE Award	Performance in a Comedy Special	HBO Comedy Hour: John Leguizamo's 'Spic-o-Rama'	Won	
1994	CableACE Award	Writing, Entertainment Special	HBO Comedy Hour: John Leguizamo's 'Spic-o-Rama'	Won	
2020	Critics' Choice Awards	Best Supporting Actor in a Limited Series or Movie Made for Television	When They See Us	Nominated	
2015	New York Emmy Awards	Entertainment Program or Special	The Lineup: The Best New York Movies	Won	
2015	New York Emmy Awards	Interview or Discussion	The Lineup: The Best New York Movies	Won	
1999	Primetime Emmy Awards	Outstanding Variety Special	John Leguizamo: Freak	Nominated	
1999	Primetime Emmy Awards	Outstanding Performance in a Variety Special	John Leguizamo: Freak	Won	
2018	Primetime Emmy Awards	Outstanding Supporting Actor in a Limited Series or Movie	Waco	Nominated	
2019	Primetime Emmy Awards	Outstanding Supporting Actor in a Limited Series or Movie	When They See Us	Nominated	
1995	Golden Globe Award	Best Supporting Actor in a Motion Picture	To Wong Foo, Thanks for Everything! Julie Newmar	Nominated	
2004	Imagen Awards	Best Actor in a Television Drama	Undefeated	Nominated	
2004	Imagen Awards	Norman Lear Writers Award		Received	
2006	Imagen Awards	Best Actor in a Feature Film	Sueño	Nominated	
2008	Imagen Awards	Best Actor in a Feature Film	Where God Left His Shoes	Nominated	
2010	Imagen Awards	Best Actor in a Feature Film	The Ministers	Nominated	
2022	Imagen Awards	Best Actor in a Feature Film	Encanto	Nominated	
2023	Imagen Awards	Best Supporting Actor in a Television Drama	The Power	Nominated	
2025	Imagen Awards	Best Actor in a Feature Film	Bob Trevino Likes It	Won	
2001	Actor Awards	Outstanding Performance by a Cast in a Motion Picture	Moulin Rouge!	Nominated	
1998	Tony Awards	Best Play	Freak	Nominated	
1998	Tony Awards	Best Actor in a Play	Freak	Nominated	
2002	Tony Awards	Best Special Theatrical Event	Sexaholix	Nominated	
2018	Tony Awards	Best Play	Latin History for Morons	Nominated	
2018	Tony Awards	Special Tony Award		Received	

== Written works ==
Books

- Mouth (Bantam Books, 1993)
- a Dysfunctional Comedy (Bantam, 1994)
- a Semidemiquasipseudo Autobiography (Riverhead Books, 1998)
- Hos Playa Hatas and All the Rest of My Hollywood Friends My Life (Ecco Press, 2006)
- Works of John Leguizamo Freak Spicorama Mambo Mouth and Sexaholix (Harper Collins, 2008)
- Klown (Abrams Books, 2015)

Comic Books

- PhemonX #1 with Aram Rappaport, Joe Miciak, and Chris Batista (November 10, 2021)
- PhenomX #2 with Aram Rappaport, Joe Miciak, and Chris Batista (December 8, 2021)
- PhemonX #3 with Aram Rappaport, Joe Miciak, and Chris Batista (January 11, 2022)
- Phenomx #4 with Aram Rappaport, Joe Miciak, and Chris Batista (February 9, 2022)
