= John Leguizamo: Freak =

1998 American filmed live performance

Freak
- Poster
- Directed by: Spike Lee
- Written by: John Leguizamo
- Produced by: Denis Biggs
- Starring: John Leguizamo
- Cinematography: Malik Hassan Sayeed
- Edited by: Barry Alexander Brown
- Distributed by: Home Box Office
- Release date: October 10, 1998
- Running time: 60 minutes
- Country: United States
- Language: English

Freak is a solo performance written by and starring John Leguizamo that debuted on Broadway in 1998. In Freak, subtitled "A Semi-Demi-Quasi-Pseudo Autobiography (His Most Dangerous Work Yet)," Leguizamo tells his own coming-of-age story by portraying dozens of different characters—friends, relatives, neighbors, etc.—that he knew growing up in Queens. Freak was also released that same year as a live television special on HBO directed by Spike Lee.

Freak was a huge critical and commercial success, both on stage and as a television special. Well received by critics, Freak was nominated for the 1998 Tony Award for Best Play, with Leguizamo additionally nominated for the 1998 Tony Award for Best Actor in a Play. The filmed version was similarly acclaimed: Freak was nominated for the 1999 Primetime Emmy Award for Outstanding Variety, Music or Comedy Special, with John Leguizamo winning the 1999 Primetime Emmy Award for Outstanding Individual Performance in a Variety or Music Program.

This last award has historical significance: with his 1999 win for Freak, John Leguizamo became the first ever Latino(a) to win a Primetime Emmy Award for Outstanding Individual Performance in a Variety or Music Program in Emmy history.

== Synopsis ==
There is no linear plot to the play, but over the course of the performance, Leguizamo traces his life from the very beginning (as a sperm cell) to the beginning of his career in show business. During the course of the play, Leguizamo portrays dozens of different characters, including friends, relatives and neighbors that he knew while growing up in Queens, New York. Leguizamo plays characters of both genders and of many different ethnicities, sometimes engaging in multi-character dialogues all by himself.

== Cast ==
- John Leguizamo as self

== Broadway Production ==
Freak marked Leguizamo's Broadway debut, following up on the success of his previous solo shows Mambo Mouth (1991), an Off-Broadway sensation, and Spic-O-Rama (1993), which enjoyed a sold-out run in Chicago before relocating to New York.

Freak began previews at Broadway's Cort Theater on January 20, 1998 and opened on February 12, 1998. Originally scheduled to run only 70 performances, its run was extended to July 5, during which time two live performances were filmed for the HBO special. Freak ended up running for 144 performances - more than double its original schedule.

"In its 20-week run, John Leguizamo’s “Freak” managed to defy Broadway’s odds in a big way. It often played to sold-out houses, a rarity for a one-man show. It attracted Latinos and Generation X-ers. And it also achieved something almost unheard of on Broadway these days: It made a profit." - The New York Daily News

Produced for just over $700,000, Freak grossed $1.2 million, making it one of the only successful plays of the season and resulting in the show's investors nearly doubling their money.

Freak was also groundbreaking for its ability to draw young and Latino audiences to its shows, two demographics that are usually underrepresented in Broadway audiences. Audience surveys found that at nearly every performance, 75% of the audience was younger than 35 and 92% was younger than 50 (compared to the average Broadway audience age at the time of 41). Moreover, polling found that nearly a third of the audience was Latino.

Freaks was produced by Arielle Tepper, Bill Haber, Gregory Mosher. It was directed and developed by David Bar Katz.

Leguizamo followed this performance up with the Broadway show Sexaholix... A Love Story in 2001, which was also filmed for HBO.

== HBO Special ==
Freak followed the path of Leguizamo's earlier one-man comedic shows, Mambo Mouth (1991) and Spic-O-Rama (1993), both of which had been filmed for HBO during their runs.

Two live performances of Freak were taped for HBO inside the Cort Theatre during the show's Broadway run in June 1998, with director Spike Lee putting together the finished special from the two evenings.

John Leguizamo's Freak premiered on HBO on October 10, 1998 at 10 pm and was re-broadcast repeatedly throughout the month of October. Like its run on Broadway, the Spike Lee-directed televised special was a critical success and both it and Leguizamo were nominated for Primetime Emmy Awards in 1999.

The making of this film prompted Lee to cast Leguizamo in the lead role of his next film the following year, Summer of Sam.

== Reception ==
Freaks was positively received by critics and audiences alike, in large part due to Leguizamo's unique energy and uncanny knack for impersonating dozens of characters.

"That the evening remains so compellingly watchable is partly because Mr. Leguizamo is not so much a stand-up comic as a jump-up, lie-down, throw-yourself-against-the-wall comic. The electric energy and physical precision with which he invests every movement takes the performance into realms the script doesn't go." - Ben Brantley, The New York Times

=== Accolades ===
Both the stage performance and filmed television special received widespread acclaim, including:

Award	Year	Recipient	Result	Ref.
Tony Award for Best Play	1998	Freak (play)	Nominated	
Tony Award for Best Actor in a Play	1998	John Leguizamo	Nominated	
Drama Desk Award for Outstanding Solo Performance	1998	Freak (play)	Won	
Primetime Emmy Award for Outstanding Individual Performance in a Variety or Music Program	1999	John Leguizamo	Won	
Primetime Emmy Award for Outstanding Variety, Music or Comedy Special	1999	Freak (film)	Nominated	
The American Latino Media Arts (ALMA) Award for Outstanding Comedy Series of Special	1999	Freak (film)	Won	
The American Latino Media Arts (ALMA) Award for Outstanding Performance by an Individual or Act in a Variety or Comedy Special	1999	John Leguizamo	Won	
Online Film & Television Association (OFTA) Award Best Variety, Musical, or Comedy Special	1999	Freak (film)	Nominated	
Online Film & Television Association (OFTA) Award Best Host or Performer of a Variety, Musical or Comedy Special	1999	John Leguizamo	Nominated	
